= Benny the Butcher discography =

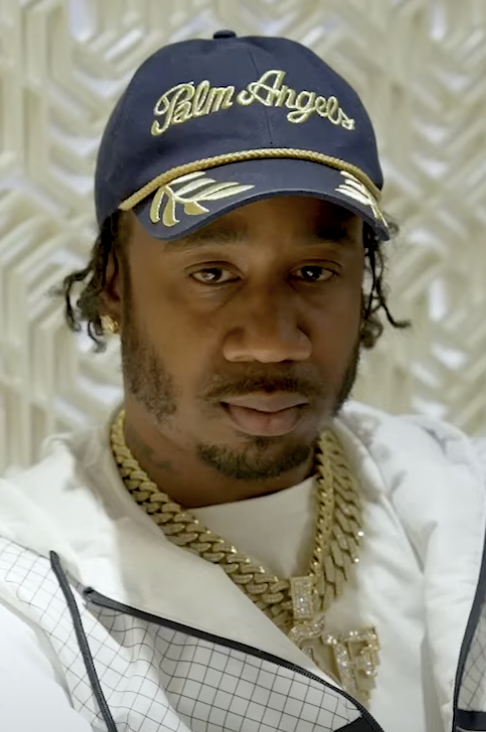
Benny the Butcher in 2023

The discography of American rapper Benny the Butcher.

== Studio albums ==
| Title | Album details | Peak chart positions | | | | | |
| Title | Album details | US | US R&B/HH | US Rap | US Ind. | CAN | UK DL |
|---|---|---|---|---|---|---|---|
| Tana Talk 3 | Released: November 23, 2018; Label: Griselda, Black Soprano Family; Format: LP, digital download, streaming | — | — | — | — | — | — |
| Burden of Proof | Released: October 16, 2020; Label: Griselda, Empire; Format: LP, digital download, streaming | 27 | 14 | 15 | 8 | 100 | — |
| Tana Talk 4 | Released: March 11, 2022; Label: Griselda, Black Soprano Family, Empire; Format: LP, digital download, streaming | 22 | 12 | 9 | 6 | — | — |
| Everybody Can't Go | Released: January 26, 2024; Label: Def Jam; Format: CD, LP, digital download, streaming | 93 | 37 | — | — | — | 46 |

=== Collaboration albums ===
List of mixtapes, with selected chart positions
| Title | Album details |
|---|---|
| Butcher on Steroids (with DJ Green Lantern) | Released: November 27, 2017; Formats: LP, digital download, streaming |
| Trust the Sopranos (with 38 Spesh) | Released: May 21, 2021; Formats: LP, digital download, streaming |
| Stabbed & Shot 2 (with 38 Spesh) | Released: October 18, 2024; Formats: vinyl, digital download, streaming |

== Extended plays ==
| Title | EP details | Peak chart positions | | | | |
| Title | EP details | US | US R&B/HH | US Rap | US Ind. | UK R&B |
|---|---|---|---|---|---|---|
| 17 Bullets | Released: December 26, 2016; Label: Black Soprano Family; Format: Digital download, streaming | — | — | — | — | — |
| Tommy Devito's Breakfast (with Cuns) | Released: October 28, 2017; Label: Tuff Kong; Format: Digital download, streaming | — | — | — | — | — |
| A Friend of Ours | Released: June 1, 2018; Label: Black Soprano Family; Format: Digital download, streaming | — | — | — | — | — |
| The Plugs I Met | Released: June 21, 2019; Label: Black Soprano Family; Format: Digital download, streaming | — | — | — | 22 | — |
| Statue of Limitations (with Smoke DZA) | Released: October 18, 2019; Label: RFC, Cinematic; Format: Digital download, streaming | — | — | — | 38 | — |
| The Plugs I Met 2 (with Harry Fraud) | Released: March 19, 2021; Label: Black Soprano Family, SRFSCHL; Format: Digital download, streaming | 33 | 16 | 13 | 5 | 21 |
| Pyrex Picasso | Released: August 13, 2021; Label: Black Soprano Family, Rare Scrilla; Format: Digital download, streaming | — | — | — | — | — |
| Excelsior | Released: May 2, 2025; Label: Black Soprano Family; Format: Digital download, streaming | — | — | — | — | — |

== Mixtapes ==
List of mixtapes, with selected chart positions
| Title | Album details |
|---|---|
| Tana Talk (as B.E.N.N.Y.) | Released: 2004; Formats: LP |
| B.E.N.N.Y. vs. Lil Wayne (as B.E.N.N.Y.) | Released: 2007; Formats: LP |
| The American D.Boy (as B.EY) | Released: February 9, 2007; Formats: LP |
| American D.Boy II: Lindsay Lohan (as B.E.N.N.Y.) | Released: October 2007; Formats: LP |
| American D.Boy III: Paris Hilton & Kate Moss (as B.E.N.N.Y.) | Released: February 2, 2009; Formats: LP |
| B.E.N.N.Y. Best Ever (as B.E.N.N.Y.) | Released: February 7, 2009; Formats: LP |
| The Mayor's Back (as B.E.N.N.Y.) | Released: February 11, 2009; Formats: LP |
| American D.Boy IV: Amy Winehouse (as B.E.N.N.Y.) | Released: February 12, 2009; Formats: LP |
| Tana Talk 2 (as B.E.N.N.Y.) | Released: February 12, 2009; Formats: LP |
| American D.Boy V (as B.E.N.N.Y.) | Released: 2009; Formats: LP |
| Chains Bond (as 2 Chain Bennymane) | Released: April 8, 2009; Formats: LP |
| Benny Montana (as B.E.N.N.Y.) | Released: 2007; Formats: LP |
| Benny Montana (as B.E.N.N.Y.) | Released: June 22, 2010; Formats: LP |
| Married 2 Da Game: The Mixtape (as B.E.N.N.Y.) | Released: 2007; Formats: LP |
| B.E.N.N.Y. Best Ever (as B.E.N.N.Y.) | Released: February 26, 2013; Formats: LP |
| Black Soprano Family (as Benny) | Released: May 11, 2015; Formats: LP |
| 1 on a 1 (as Benny) | Released: March 8, 2016; Formats: LP |
| 1 on a 1 | Released: March 8, 2016; Formats: LP, digital download, streaming |
| My First Brick | Released: October 8, 2016; Formats: LP, digital download, streaming |

== Collaboration mixtapes ==
- Best of the Underworld (as B.E.N.N.Y. with Johnal) (2006)
- Cocaine Cowboys (as B.E.N.N.Y. with .38 Special) (2009)
- Who Wants What (with Street Entertainment and DJ Kay Slay) (2006)
- SE Gang Bang Bang (with Street Entertainment) (2005)
- The Pre-season: Mixtape Series (with Buff City Music Group) (2012)
- Stabbed & Shot (with 38 Spesh) (2018)
- Searchin' for a Purpose (with Black Soprano Family) (2020)
- Da Respected Sopranos (with Black Soprano Family and DJ Drama) (2020)
- Long Live DJ Shay (with Black Soprano Family) (2022)
- Summertime Butch (with Black Soprano Family) (2024)
- Summertime Butch 2 (with Black Soprano Family) (2025)

== With Griselda ==
- WWCD (2019)

== Guest appearances ==
| Year | Artist | Album | Song |
|---|---|---|---|
| 2015 | Westside Gunn | Hitler Wears Hermes 3 | "Bon Jovi" |
| 2015 | Conway The Machine, Mach-Hommy | Reject 2 | "Beloved" |
| 2016 | Westside Gunn | Flygod | "Shower Shoe Lords" |
| 2016 | Westside Gunn | There’s God and There’s Flygod, Praise Both | "Pissy Work" |
| 2016 | Westside Gunn, Conway The Machine | Hitler Wears Hermes 4 | "Nitro" |
| 2017 | Westside Gunn & DJ Green Lantern | Hitler on Steroids | "Lookin’ Like the Greatest" |
| 2017 | Conway The Machine & DJ Green Lantern | Reject on Steroids | "Spurs" |
| 2017 | Conway The Machine & DJ Green Lantern | More Steroids | "Spurs 2" |
| 2017 | Meyhem Lauren & DJ Muggs, Hologram | Gems from the Equinox | "War Drums" |
| 2017 | Westside Gunn, Styles P | Hitler Wears Hermes 5 | "Down State" |
| 2017 | Nicholas Craven, Johnny Hustle | Craven N | "Dying" |
| 2017 | Conway The Machine | G.O.A.T. | "DIE ON XMAS" |
| 2017 | Conway The Machine, Lloyd Banks | G.O.A.T. | "Bullet Klub" |
| 2018 | Crimeapple & Big Ghost Ltd, Milano Constantine, Eto | Aguardiente | "Gorillas" |
| 2018 | data-sort-value="" style="background: var(--background-color-interactive, #ececec); color: var(--color-base, inherit); vertical-align: middle; text-align: center; " class="table-na" | Non-album single | "Easter Gunday 3" | |
| 2018 | Smoke DZA | Ringside 6 | "Deblase Decisions" |
| 2018 | The Alchemist, Styles P | Bread | "Massacre" |
| 2018 | Westside Gunn, Jadakiss | Supreme Blientele | "GODS Don't Bleed" |
| 2018 | Westside Gunn, Conway The Machine | Supreme Blientele | "Brutus" |
| 2018 | Westside Gunn, Busta Rhymes | Supreme Blientele | Brossface Brippler |
| 2018 | Left Lane Didon | Back Doe Lil Joe | "Duece Duece" |
| 2018 | Kool G Rap & 38 Spesh, N.O.R.E., Vado | Son of G Rap | "Binoculars" |
| 2018 | Elcamino | Walking on Water | "Communion" |
| 2018 | Elcamino | Walking on Water | "Rayful Bag" |
| 2018 | Elcamino, Meyhem Lauren | Walking on Water | "Shook" |
| 2018 | Westside Gunn | Hitler Wears Hermes 6 | "GiGis" |
| 2018 | Westside Gunn | Hitler Wears Hermes 6 | "B.I.G. Luther Freestyle" |
| 2018 | Westside Gunn, Flee Lord | Hitler Wears Hermes 6 | "Niggas in Puerto Rico" |
| 2018 | Ghostface Killah & Big Ghost Ltd, 38 Spesh, KXNG Crooked | Lost Tapes | "Buckingham Palace" |
| 2018 | Dark Lo & V Don | Timeless | "Roy Jones" |
| 2018 | Conway The Machine | Everybody Is F.O.O.D. 2: Eat What U Kill! | "Hide the Body" |
| 2019 | 38 Spesh, Green Double, Klass Murda | The 38 Strategies of Raw | "Trust Gang" |
| 2019 | Ché Noir | The Thrill of the Hunt | "Tyson" |
| 2019 | Smoke DZA | Prime Location, Vol. 1 | "Luck of Draw" |
| 2019 | Flee Lord | Gets Greater Later | "Butcher Lords" |
| 2019 | Elcamino | Don't Eat The Fruit | "Venice Beach" |
| 2019 | Westside Gunn | Fourth Rope | "Lotto" |
| 2019 | DJ Premier, Westside Gunn, Conway The Machine|data-sort-value="" style="background: var(--background-color-interactive, #ececec); color: var(--color-base, inherit); vertical-align: middle; text-align: center; " class="table-na" | Non-album single | Headlines | |
| 2019 | RJ Payne | Leatherface | "Butcher Meets Leatherface" |
| 2019 | RJ Payne, Jackprogresso, Dark Lo, Tristate, Conway The Machine | Leatherface | "Mortifying" |
| 2019 | Jim Jones, Cam'ron, Conway The Machine, Guordon Banks | El Capo | "To Whom It May Concern" |
| 2019 | Westside Gunn | FLYGOD Is an Awesome God | "Sensational Sherri" |
| 2019 | Westside Gunn, Conway The Machine | FLYGOD Is an Awesome God | "Pete's Sake" |
| 2019 | Flee Lord & 38 Spesh | Loyalty & Trust | "Benny the Butcher Skit" |
| 2019 | The Alchemist, Elcamino | Yacht Rock 2 | "Sand Castles" |
| 2019 | Conway The Machine, Westside Gunn | Look What I Became | "Tito's Back" |
| 2019 | Skyzoo & Pete Rock, Conway The Machine, Elzhi, Westside Gunn | Retropolitan | "Eastern Conference All-Stars" |
| 2019 | Dark Lo | American Made | "Ripped Apart" |
| 2019 | clipping., Elcamino, The Rita | There Existed an Addiction to Blood | "La Mala Ordina" |
| 2019 | 38 Spesh, Conway the Machine | 1994 | Never Seen a Man Cry |
| 2019 | Westside Gunn, Curren$y | Hitler Wears Hermes 7 | "Lucha Bros" |
| 2019 | Styles P, Conway The Machine | PRESENCE | "Blam, Blam, Blam" |
| 2019 | Fred The Godson, 38 Spesh | God Level | "Nokia" |
| 2019 | Elcamino | Elcamino 2 | "Shrimp at Phillipes" |
| 2019 | Paul Wall & Statik Selektah | Give Thanks | "OverCame" |
| 2020 | Hit-Boy | The Chauncey Hollis Project | "All Business" |
| 2020 | Russ | SHAKE THE SNOW GLOBE | "I THOUGHT YOU GOT ME" |
| 2020 | Boldy James & The Alchemist | The Price of Tea in China | "Scrape The Bowl" |
| 2020 | Royce Da 5'9", Ashley Sorrell | The Allegory | "Upside Down" |
| 2020 | Grafh | The Oracle 3 | "Blow" |
| 2020 | Westside Gunn, Conway The Machine | Pray For Paris | "George Bondo" |
| 2020 | Westside Gunn, Conway The Machine | Pray For Paris | "ALLAH SENT ME" |
| 2020 | Freddie Gibbs & The Alchemist | Alfredo | "Frank Lucas" |
| 2020 | Lil Wayne, Conway the Machine | Funeral (Deluxe) | "Russian Roulette" |
| 2020 | Tsu Surf | MSYKM | "Blacc Cream" |
| 2020 | Stogie T, Alonda Rich|data-sort-value="" style="background: var(--background-color-interactive, #ececec); color: var(--color-base, inherit); vertical-align: middle; text-align: center; " class="table-na" | Non-album single | "Animals" | |
| 2020 | Westside Gunn, Boldy James | FLYGOD Is an Awesome God 2 | "Buffs vs. Wires" |
| 2020 | Don Q|data-sort-value="" style="background: var(--background-color-interactive, #ececec); color: var(--color-base, inherit); vertical-align: middle; text-align: center; " class="table-na" | Non-album single | "Legends" | |
| 2020 | Dave East | Karma 3 | "Stone Killer" |
| 2020 | The LOX, Westside Gunn | Living Off Xperience | "Think of the LOX" |
| 2020 | Conway the Machine, Westside Gunn | From King to a God | "Spurs 3" |
| 2020 | Armani Caesar | THE LIZ | "Drill a RaMa" |
| 2020 | Armani Caesar | THE LIZ | "Simply Done" |
| 2020 | Westside Gunn, Conway the Machine | WHO MADE THE SUNSHINE? | "The Butcher and the Blade" |
| 2020 | Westside Gunn, Conway the Machine, Armani Caesar | WHO MADE THE SUNSHINE? | "98 Sabres" |
| 2020 | T.I., Jadakiss | The L.I.B.R.A. | "Make Amends" |
| 2020 | Sleek Louch, Ragz Da Artist | Beast Mode, Vol. 4 | "Spirit of Griselda" |
| 2020 | Chase Fetti & 38 Spesh | Top of the Red | "Own Pots" |
| 2020 | Dej Loaf, Boldy James, Conway the Machine | Sell Sole II | "Get Money" |
| 2020 | French Montana | CB5 | "Wave Blues" |
| 2020 | Russ, Black Thought | CHOMP | "Momentum" |
| 2020 | Kash Doll & DJ Infamous, Latto|data-sort-value="" style="background: var(--background-color-interactive, #ececec); color: var(--color-base, inherit); vertical-align: middle; text-align: center; " class="table-na" | Non-album single | "Bad Azz" | |
| 2020 | Statik Selektah, Paul Wall | Balancing Act | "No Substitute" |
| 2020 | Heem B$F & DJ Green Lantern | Long Story Short | "The Realest" |
| 2020 | Heem B$F & DJ Green Lantern, Rick Hyde | Long Story Short | "It Could Happen" |
| 2021 | Uncle Murda, Que Banz | Don’t Come Outside, Vol. 3 | "Whole Lotta Money" |
| 2021 | DJ Drama, Hardo, Deezlee | Fame or Feds 3 | "Chaining Day" |
| 2021 | Chase Fetti, Heem | Conflicted (soundtrack) | "Mobbin" |
| 2021 | (solo) | Conflicted (soundtrack) | "3:30 in Houston" |
| 2021 | Armani Caesar, Westside Gunn | Conflicted (soundtrack) | "Mission Accomplished" |
| 2021 | Neek Bucks | Neighborhood Hov | "Pain" |
| 2021 | Denzel Curry & Kenny Beats | UNLOCKED 1.5 | "DIET_1.5" |
| 2021 | Conway the Machine, Westside Gunn | La Maquina | "S.E. Gang" |
| 2021 | DMX, Griselda | Exodus | "Hood Blues" |
| 2021 | Smoke DZA, Nym Lo | The Hustler's Catalog 2 | "Ramadan" |
| 2021 | Lloyd Banks | The Course of the Inevitable | "Formaldehyde" |
| 2021 | Bobby Sessions, Freddie Gibbs | Manifest | "Gold Rolex" |
| 2021 | BFB Da Packman | Fat Niggas Need Love Too | "Frenchmen" |
| 2021 | Dave East & Harry Fraud | HOFFA | "Uncle Ric" |
| 2021 | Boldy James & The Alchemist | Bo Jackson | "Brickmile to Montana" |
| 2021 | Millyz | Blanco 4 | "Benny Blanco" |
| 2021 | Rick Hyde, G Herbo | Plates II | "Alone" |
| 2021 | Rick Hyde, Keisha Plum | Plates II | "Glorious Morning" |
| 2021 | Rick Hyde, Heem B$F | Plates II | "Black Sinatra" |
| 2021 | Belly | See You Next Wednesday | "Money on the Table" |
| 2021 | Westside Gunn, Conway The Machine, DJ Clue | Hitler Wears Hermes 8: Sincerely Adolf | "Claires Back" |
| 2021 | Westside Gunn, Conway The Machine | Hitler Wears Hermes 8: Side B | "Hell on Earth, Pt. 2" |
| 2021 | Grafh & DJ Shay | Stop Calling Art Content | "Very Different" |
| 2021 | REASON, Isaiah Rashad, Doe Boy | No More, No Less: Demo 1 | "12am in Atl" |
| 2021 | Snoop Dogg, Busta Rhymes, Jadakiss | Snoop Dogg Presents Algorithm | "Murder Music" |
| 2021 | Berner, Styles P, Conway The Machine, Mozzy | GOTTI | "Pound for Pound" |
| 2021 | Rick Ross | Richer Than I Ever Been | "Rapper Estates" |
| 2021 | OT the Real & DJ Green Lantern | Broken Glass | "Coke & Guns" |
| 2022 | Token | Pink Is Better | "Amsterdam" |
| 2022 | Conway the Machine, Westside Gunn | God Don't Make Mistakes | "John Woo Flick" |
| 2022 | Dave East, Steven Young | HDIGH | "Don't Let Me Down" |
| 2022 | Bun B & Cory Mo | Mo Trill | "Theme Song" |
| 2022 | Last Days | Rose God Don | "What You Into" |
| 2022 | Sy Ari da Kid | The Shadow In the Shade | "Press 0" |
| 2022 | IMYOUNGWORLD | BLEU | "SHINE" |
| 2022 | Lobby Boyz | The Lobby Boyz | "Praying" |
| 2022 | Rick Hyde, Jonezy, Loveboat Luciano | Stima | "Like This" |
| 2022 | Trillmatic Goods & Conway The Machine, Flee Lord | Organized Grime 2 | "Marathon" |
| 2022 | BLK Odyssey, George Clinton | BLK Vintage: Reprise | "Benny's Got a Gun" |
| 2022 | French Montana, Harry Fraud, Jadakiss | Montega | "Bricks & Bags" |
| 2022 | Money Man | Big Money | "Overload" |
| 2022 | Lloyd Banks | The Course of the Inevitable 2 | "Living Proof" |
| 2022 | Maxo Kream | WEIGHT OF THE WORLD (DELUXE) | "FOOTBALL HEADS" |
| 2022 | Black Soprano Family, Rick Hyde | Long Live DJ Shay | "Shay Face" |
| 2022 | Black Soprano Family, Rick Hyde, Heem B$F, DJ Premier | Long Live DJ Shay | "Times Is Rough' |
| 2022 | Black Soprano Family, Rick Hyde, Heem B$F, Armani Caesar | Long Live DJ Shay | "Bigger Bsf" |
| 2022 | Rome Streetz, Stove God Cooks | KISS THE RING | "Blow 4 Blow" |
| 2022 | G Herbo | Survivor's Remorse: A Side | "Real Rap" |
| 2022 | Armani Caesar, Stove God Cooks | THE LIZ 2 | "Hunnit Dolla Hiccup" |
| 2022 | Ché Noir | The Last Remnants | "Wash The Dishes" |
| 2022 | Westside Gunn, Stove God Cooks, Rome Streetz, Armani Caesar, Jay Worthy, Conway the Machine & Robby Takac | 10 | "Red Death" |
| 2022 | 38 Spesh, Ransom, Harry Fraud | Beyond Belief | "Band of Brothers" |
| 2022 | Chinx, JFK Waxx | CR6 | "Check This Out" |
| 2022 | Black Soprano Family| rowspan="2" data-sort-value="" style="background: var(--background-color-interactive, #ececec); color: var(--color-base, inherit); vertical-align: middle; text-align: center; " class="table-na" | Non-album single | "We Here" | |
| 2022 | Black Soprano Family| rowspan="2" data-sort-value="" style="background: var(--background-color-interactive, #ececec); color: var(--color-base, inherit); vertical-align: middle; text-align: center; " class="table-na" | Non-album single | "Saint Maurice" | |
| 2023 | French Montana & DJ Drama | Coke Boys 6 | "RZA" |
| 2023 | Guè | Madreperla | "Da 1k In Su" |
| 2023 | iyla | APETITE FOR DISASTER | "Lost Me" |
| 2023 | Neek Bucks, Raekwon | BLESSED TO THE MAX | "GAMBINOS" |
| 2023 | Mick Jenkins | The Patience | Sitting Ducks |
| 2023 | Jim Jones, trav | Back in My Prime | Bet It All |
| 2023 | Conway the Machine, Fabolous | WON'T HE DO IT | Brooklyn Chop House |
| 2023 | IDK | F65 | Up the Score |
| 2023 | DJ Drama, Fabolous, Jim Jones, Capelonia | I'M REALLY LIKE THAT | Forever |
| 2023 | .38 Spesh & Conway the Machine | Speshal Machinery | Goodfellas |
| 2023 | Smoke DZA and Flying Lotus, Black Thought | Flying Objects | Drug Trade Pt. 2 |
| 2023 | Curren$y & Harry Fraud | VICES | Stingray |
| 2023 | Leon Thomas | Electric Dusk | X-Rated |
| 2023 | Teflon | 2 Sides to Every Story | Hostile Takeover |
| 2023 | Swizz Beatz, Jadakiss, Scarlip | Hip Hop 50: Vol. 2 | Take 'Em Out |
| 2023 | Tony Touch, Conway the Machine | The Def Tape | We Shot Ya |
| 2023 | Westside Gunn, Conway the Machine | And Then You Pray for Me | Kostas |
| 2023 | Conway the Machine, .38 Spesh | Drumwork: The Album | LALO |
| 2023 | 2 Chainz & LIl Wayne | Collegrove 2 | Oprah & Gayle |
| 2023 | Jolagreen23 | RECHERCHE&DESTRUCTION | OKC |
| 2023 | Statik Selektah, Termanology | Round Trip | Different League |
| 2024 | Cam Wells | ` | Tony Two Tone |
| 2024 | Jay Worthy, Chuck Inglish | ` | Summer Activity |
| 2024 | Uncle Murda | Lenny Grant Story | No Safety |
| 2024 | Westside Gunn, DJ Drama | Still Praying | Still Praying |
| 2024 | Stalley | Peerless | Boiler Room |
| 2024 | .38 Spesh | Mother & Gun | Underestimated |
| 2024 | Dave East, Aarabmuzik, Swizz Beatz | Living Proof | Lift Em Up |
| 2024 | Payroll Giovani | Hustle Muzik | Deeply Involved |
| 2024 | Boldy James and Harry Fraud | The Bricktionary | Rabies |
| 2024 | Jay Electronica, Freeway, Black Thought, Metal Feet & Jotaka Eaddy | Vote or Else | Still Here |
| 2024 | Sule, Black Soprano Family | Written on Wides Corner | Trois Sopranos |
| 2025 | Wu-Tang Clan, Method Man | Black Samson, Bastard Swordsman | Warriors Two, Coolie High |
| 2025 | Memphis Bleek, Smoke DZA | Apt 3D | 3 Kingz |
| 2025 | BLP Kosher, DJ Premier | Brackish | Benny & the Jetz |
| 2025 | Raekwon, Griselda | Emperor's New Clothes | Wild Corsicans |
| 2026 | Westside Gunn | Heelmatic | "DON PISTOLA" |
| 2026 | Westside Gunn | Heelmatic | "HURT + HEEL" |
| 2026 | Westside Gunn | Heelmatic | "BOTTOM BUNK LEGENDS" |

=== Charted songs ===
| Title | Year | Peak chart positions | | | | | Album |
| Title | Year | US | US R&B/HH | US Rap | CAN | WW | Album |
|---|---|---|---|---|---|---|---|
| "Johnny P's Caddy" (with J. Cole) | 2022 | 72 | 22 | 14 | 84 | 139 | Tana Talk 4 |

=== Music videos ===
As lead artist
| Year | Album | Title | Director | Featured artist |
|---|---|---|---|---|
| 2015 | Black Soprano Family | La Familia | Austin Martinelli | G Herbo |
| 2016 | 1 On A 1 | All In My Head | n/c | |
| 2016 | My First Brick | Me & Doug | AK.Reed Films | |
| 2017 | Butcher on Steroids | Change | THC Films | |
| 2017 | Butcher on Steroids | Hustler's Wife | THC Films | |
| 2018 | Stabbed & Shot | 2 Weapons | n/c | 38 Spesh |
| 2018 | Stabbed & Shot | Man Of The Kitchen | GrecTVfilms | |
| 2018 | A Friend of Ours | India | Solo Visions | El Camino |
| 2018 | A Friend of Ours | Long Way | Slim Gus. The Video Shotta | El Camino |
| 2018 | A Friend of Ours | Jackpot | D. Hawks | El Camino |
| 2018 | Tana Talk 3 | Joe Pesci 38 | Slim Gus. The Video Shotta | |
| 2018 | Tana Talk 3 | Broken Bottles | Mercenary Films | |
| 2019 | Tana Talk 3 | Rubber Bands & Weight | Slim Gus. The Video Shotta | |
| 2019 | Tana Talk 3 | Scarface Vs. Sosa Pt. 2 | Condido Verona | |
| 2019 | The Plugs I Met | 5 to 50 | Otto the Director | India |
| 2019 | The Plugs I Met | Took the Money to the Plug's House | Condido Verona | |
| 2019 | The Plugs I Met | Sunday School (Live Version) | 1000 Words | Jadakiss, 38 Spesh |
| 2020 | Burden of Proof | Legend | Joe Lombard | Hit-Boy |
| 2020 | Burden of Proof | Famous | The Wizard | |
| 2020 | Burden of Proof | Trade It All | The Wizard | |
| 2021 | The Plugs I Met 2 | Thanksgiving | The Wizard | Harry Fraud |
| 2021 | The Plugs I Met 2 | Plug Talk | The Wizard | Harry Fraud, 2 Chainz |
| 2021 | The Plugs I Met 2 | Survivor's Remorse | The Digggers | Harry Fraud, Rick Hyde |
| 2021 | The Plugs I Met 2 | When Tony Met Sosa | The Digggers | Harry Fraud |
| 2021 | The Plugs I Met 2 | Overall | Paperface | Harry Fraud, Chinx |
| 2021 | Long Live DJ Shay | Mr. Pyrex Man | The Wizard | |
| 2022 | Tana Talk 4 | Johnny P's Caddy | Heirs | J. Cole |
| 2022 | Tana Talk 4 | 10 More Commandments | The Wizard | Diddy |
| 2022 | Tana Talk 4 | Bust a Brick Nick | Kat, Tony Deniro, Blu | |
| 2022 | Tana Talk 4 | Uncle Bun | Nitro4K | 38 Spesh |
| 2022 | Tana Talk 4 | Super Plug | CMDelux | |
| 2022 | / | Welcome to the States | n/c | |
| 2022 | Tana Talk 4 | Thowy's Revenge | Max Toshiro | |
| 2023 | / | Big Dog | Ricky Alvarez | Lil Wayne |
| 2023 | / | One Foot In | The Wizard | Stove God Cooks |
| 2024 | Everybody Can't Go | BRON | The Wizard | |
| 2024 | Everybody Can't Go | Back Again | Thirdeyeraz | Snoop Dogg |
