= Westside Gunn discography =

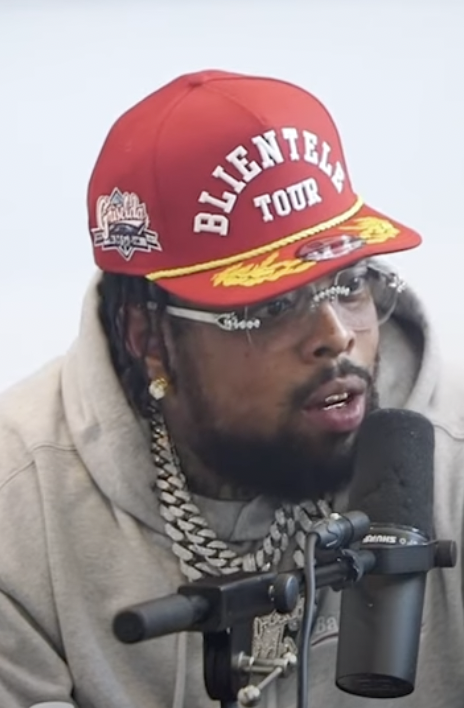
Gunn in 2023

The discography of American rapper Westside Gunn.

== Studio albums ==
List of studio albums, with selected details and peak chart positions
Title	Album details	Peak chart positions				
Title	Album details	US	US R&B/HH	US Ind.	AUS	CAN
Flygod	Released: March 11, 2016; Label: Griselda; Format: LP, digital download, streaming	—	—	—	—	—
Supreme Blientele	Released: June 22, 2018; Label: Griselda, Empire; Format: LP, digital download, streaming	—	—	26	—	—
Pray for Paris	Released: April 17, 2020; Label: Griselda, Empire; Format: LP, digital download, streaming	67	39	8	—	—
Who Made the Sunshine	Released: October 2, 2020; Label: Griselda, Shady, Interscope; Format: digital download, streaming	—	—	—	—	—
And Then You Pray for Me	Released: October 13, 2023; Label: Griselda, Empire; Format: CD, LP, digital download, streaming	29	8	6	81	95
Heelmatic	Released: November 13, 2026; Label: Griselda, Mass Appeal; Format: CD, LP, digital download, streaming	—	—	—	—	—

=== With Griselda ===
- Don't Get Scared Now (2016)
- WWCD (2019)

== EPs ==
- There's God and There's Flygod, Praise Both (2016)
- Riots on Fashion Avenue (with Mil Beats) (2017)
- WestSide Doom (with MF Doom) (2017)
- Flygod Is Good... All the Time (with Mr. Green) (2018)
- 11 (2024)
- Heels Have Eyes (2025)
- My Sauconys Glowin (2025)

== Mixtapes ==
Title	Mixtape details	Peak chart positions	
Title	Mixtape details	US	US Ind.
Hitler Wears Hermes	Released: October 23, 2012; Label: Griselda; Format: Digital download, streaming	—	—
Hitler Wears Hermes 2	Released: September 22, 2014; Label: Griselda; Format: Digital download, streaming	—	—
Hitler Wears Hermes 3	Released: September 16, 2015; Label: Griselda; Format: Digital download, streaming	—	—
Hitler Wears Hermes 4	Released: October 31, 2016; Label: Griselda; Format: Digital download, streaming	—	—
Hitler Wears Hermes 5	Released: October 31, 2017; Label: Griselda; Format: Digital download, streaming	—	—
Hitler Wears Hermes 6	Released: October 31, 2018; Label: Griselda; Format: Digital download, streaming	—	—
Flygod Is an Awesome God	Released: July 5, 2019; Label: Griselda; Format: Digital download, streaming	—	17
Hitler Wears Hermes 7	Released: November 1, 2019; Label: Griselda; Format: Digital download, streaming	—	47
Flyest Nig@@ in Charge, Vol. 1	Released: January 2, 2020 (recorded in 2005); Label: Griselda; Format: Digital download, streaming	—	—
Flygod Is an Awesome God 2	Released: July 3, 2020; Label: Griselda; Format: Digital download, streaming	—	—
Hitler Wears Hermes 8: Sincerely Adolf	Released: August 27, 2021; Label: Griselda, Empire; Format: Digital download, streaming	—	34
Hitler Wears Hermes 8: Side B	Released: September 24, 2021; Label: Griselda, Empire; Format: Digital download, streaming	196	34
Peace "Fly" God	Released: July 8, 2022; Label: Griselda; Format: Digital download, streaming	—	—
10	Released: October 28, 2022; Label: Griselda, Empire; Format: Digital download, streaming	183	29
Still Praying	Released: November 1, 2024; Label: Griselda; Format: Digital download, streaming	—	37
12	Released: February 14, 2025; Label: Griselda; Format: Digital download, streaming	—	35
Heels Have Eyes 2	Released: August 28, 2025; Label: Griselda; Format: Digital download, streaming	—	35
Heels Have Eyes 3	Released: October 31, 2025; Label: Griselda; Format: Digital download, streaming	—	—

=== Collaborative mixtapes ===
- Hall & Nash (with Conway the Machine) (2015)
- Griselda Ghost (with Conway the Machine and Big Ghost LTD) (2015)
- Roses are Red... So Is Blood (with The Purist) (2016)
- Hitler on Steroids (with DJ Green Lantern) (2017)
- Hall & Nash 2: The Original Version (with Conway the Machine & The Alchemist) (2023)
- Still Praying (with DJ Drama) (2024)

== Charted songs ==
Title	Year	Peak chart positions						Album
Title	Year	US	US R&B/HH	US Rap	AUS	CAN	WW	Album
"Keep My Spirit Alive" (Kanye West featuring Conway the Machine and Westside Gunn)	2021	59	28	23	41	51	51	Donda
"Lost Forever" (Travis Scott featuring Westside Gunn)	2023	46	22	20	71	39	47	Utopia

== Guest appearances ==
Title	Year	Other artist(s)	Album
"Karoshi"	2014	The Purist	Pyrex Scholar
"Luxury"	2015	Skyzoo	Music For My Friends
"Triple Beams"	2015	Apollo Brown, Planet Asia	Grandeur
"Rex Ryan"	2015	Conway the Machine, Roc Marciano	Reject 2
"Air Holez"	2015	Conway the Machine	Reject 2
"Stand Tall"	2015	V Don, Eto, Conway the Machine, Willie The Kid	The Opiate
"The Curve"	2016	Termanology, Conway the Machine, Your Old Droog	More Politics
"Banjo"	2016	Royce da 5'9", Conway the Machine, Styles P	Tabernacle: Trust The Shooter
"Red Mullet"	2016	Sonnyjim	Mud In My Malbec
"Basquiat on the Draw"	2016	Skyzoo & Apollo Brown, Conway the Machine	The Easy Truth
"Tom Ford Socks"	2016	Benny the Butcher, Conway the Machine	My First Brick
"The Club"	2017	Smoke DZA, Conway the Machine	Ringside 5
"Gov Ball"	2017	Royce da 5'9", Conway the Machine	The Bar Exam 4
"A Thousand Birds"	2017	The Alchemist & Budgie, Conway the Machine	The Good Book, Vol. 2
"Amen"	2017	Passport Gift, Royce da 5'9", Conway the Machine	—N/a
"The Terribles"	2017	Bless Picasso & Wilt 757, Conway the Machine	—N/a
"Full Tank in the Bronco"	2017	Smoke DZA, LevyGrey	Cuz I Felt Like It Again
"Blood, Sweat & Tearz"	2017	Elcamino	Elcamino
"No. 8"	2017	Statik Selektah, Conway the Machine, Termanology	8
"Razors"	2017	Nicholas Craven	Craven N
"Victims of Vogue"	2017	Hus KingPin	Waves R Us
"Larry Gagosian"	2017	Camoflauge Monk	—N/a
"3 for 25"	2018	Meyhem Lauren & Harry Fraud	Glass
"Demon Eyes"	2018	Smoke DZA	Ringside 6
"Judas"	2018	The Alchemist, Conway the Machine	Lunch Meat
"Dead Wrong"	2018	DJ Skizz	High-Powered
"Had Enough"	2018	Flee Lord	Loyalty or Death: Lord Talk, Vol. 2
"Untitled Drums"	2018	Conway the Machine & Imported Goods	—N/a
"Echo Long"	2018	Benny the Butcher, Meyhem Lauren	Tana Talk 3
"Fifty One"	2018	Benny the Butcher	Tana Talk 3
"Lamy"	2018	al.divino, Widowmaker, Sauce Heist, Conway the Machine	—N/a
"Ray Mysterio"	2018	The Alchemist, Conway the Machine	Bread
"Concrete"	2019	Bun B & Statik Selektah, Termanology	TrillStatik
"Fendi Seats"	2019	Camoflauge Monk	—N/a
"Headlines"	2019	DJ Premier, Conway the Machine, Benny the Butcher	—N/a
"Eastside"	2019	The Alchemist, Conway the Machine	Yacht Rock 2
"Tito's Back"	2019	Conway the Machine, Benny the Butcher	Look What I Became...
"Eastern Conference All-Stars"	2019	Skyzoo & Pete Rock, Benny the Butcher, Conway the Machine, Elzhi	Retropolitan
"7:30"	2019	Smoke DZA & Benny the Butcher	Statue of Limitations
"Boosie Fade"	2019	Roc Marciano	Marcielago
"The Rivington"	2019	Free Nationals, Conway the Machine, Joyce Wrice	Free Nationals
"Robert Horry"	2019	DirtyDiggs, Conway the Machine	—N/a
"Overcomer"	2020	Royce da 5'9"	The Allegory
"Morse Code"	2020	Smoke DZA	A Closed Mouth Don't Get Fed
"Welfare"	2020	RMR	Drug Dealing Is a Lost Art
"Andale"	2020	Emis Killa	—N/a
"Roxycontin"	2020	Boldy James, Keisha Plum, Tiona Deniece	The Versace Tape
"Think of the Lox"	2020	The Lox, Benny the Butcher	Living Off Xperience
"Spurs 3"	2020	Conway the Machine, Benny the Butcher	From King to a God
"Mac 10s for Everybody"	2020	Armani Caesar	The Liz
"Stained Glass"	2020	The Alchemist	A Doctor, Painter & an Alchemist Walk Into a Bar
"War Paint"		Benny the Butcher, Conway the Machine	Burden of Proof
"Cut It 3x"		Flee Lord	No More Humble Fashion
"Mission Accomplished"	2021	Armani Caesar, Benny The Butcher	Griselda & BSF: Conflicted (Original Motion Picture Soundtrack)
"The Hurt Business"	2021	Smoke DZA, Wale	Griselda & BSF: Conflicted (Original Motion Picture Soundtrack)
"London Fog"	2021	Lord Apex & V Don	Supply & Demand (Deluxe)
"Westside Gunn's Interlude"	2021	Joyce Wrice, Esta.	Overgrown
"Until I Say So"	2021	Shantel May	Don't Let Them See You
"Stain"	2021	Peter Rosenberg	Real Late
"S.E. Gang"	2021	Conway the Machine, Benny the Butcher	La Maquina
"Big Steppa"	2021	Smoke DZA, Currensy	The Hustler's Catalog 2
"Folie A Deux"	2021	Mach-Hommy, Keisha Plum	Pray for Haiti
"Murder Czn"	2021	Mach-Hommy	Pray for Haiti
"Rami"	2021	Mach-Hommy	Pray for Haiti
"Hood Blues"	2021	DMX, Benny the Butcher, Conway the Machine	Exodus
"Red"	2021	IDK, Jay Electronica, MF Doom	USee4Yourself
"The Narcissist"	2021	Brady Watt, DJ Premier	—N/a
"Brick After Brick"	2021	Fabolous	Godfather of Harlem: Season 2 (Original Series Soundtrack)
"Keep My Spirit Alive"	2021	Kanye West, Conway the Machine	Donda
"Forsaken"	2021	YWF Ricky P	Belong To The Scriptures
"Salute"	2021	Russ, Styles P	Chomp 2
"These Niggas Sick"	2021	G.T.	Money Counter Music, Vol. 1
"I Need An Angel"	2022	Lil Outfit	A Quick Reminder
"John Woo Flick"	2022	Conway the Machine, Benny the Butcher	God Don't Make Mistakes
"Guerrero"	2022	Benny the Butcher	Tana Talk 4
"Brand New 911"	2022	Joey Badass	2000
"Faithful"	2022	Diamond D	The Rear View
"Trigger Point Therapy"	2022	Meyhem Lauren & Daringer	Black Vladimir
"Intro"	2022	Black Soprano Family, Fuego Base	Long Live DJ Shay
"Non Factor"	2022	Rome Streetz	Kiss the Ring
"Paula Deen"	2022	Armani Caesar	The Liz 2
"350"	2023	DJ Drama, Lule, Rick Ross	I'm Really Like That
"Brucifix"	2023	Conway the Machine	Won't He Do It
"OLDNACKDONALDHADAFARM"	2023	Estee Nack	Nacksaw Jim Duggan
"Corintios 13:12"	2023	Cruz Cafuné	Me Muevo Con Dios
"Griselda & The Blazettes"	2023	Drumwork Music Group, Conway The Machine	Hidden Drums
"Fly Gods"	2023	Babyface Ray	Summer's Mine
"Lost Forever"	2023	Travis Scott	Utopia
"Runaway"	2023	DJ Premier, Rome Streetz	—N/a
"Sicilian Gold"	2023	DJ Muggs, Ghostface Killah	Soul Assassins 3: Death Valley
"No Yeast (Remix)"	2023	Currensy & The Alchemist, Boldy James	—N/a
"Mint Chocolate"	2023	1999 Write the Future, BadBadNotGood, Conway the Machine	Hella
"Griselda Express"	2024	Benny the Butcher, Conway the Machine, Rick Hyde	Everybody Can't Go
"Where They At"	2024	French Montana, Kanye West	Mac & Cheese 5
"Richies Part Two"	2024	Talib Kweli & Madlib, Roc Marciano	Liberation 2
"Another Full Tank in the Bronco"	2024	Smoke DZA & DJ RellyRel, Stove God Cooks	You're All Welcome
"Black Widow"	2024	Rome Streetz & Daringer	Hatton Garden Holdup
"The Hurt Syndicate"	2024	Smoke DZA, Montel Vontavious Porter	—N/a
"Trillselda 2"	2024	Bun B & Statik Selektah, Conway The Machine, Boldy James	TrillStatik 4
"Ray Lewis"	2024	Spectacular Diagnostics, Conway The Machine	RAW GAME (Ten Year Edition)
"Tommy Snort"	2025	Spectacular Diagnostics, Conway The Machine	RAW GAME (Ten Year Edition)
"Long Live J Dilla"	2025	Karriem Riggins, Busta Rhymes	—N/a
"Words from Westside"	2025	ILL Tone Beats & Black Soprano Family	The Outcome
"Jasmine's"	2025	Benny the Butcher	Summertime Butch 2
"The Louvre"	2025	Statik Selektah, Stove God Cooks, Joey Badass, Rome Streetz	—N/a
"Wild Corsicans"	2025	Raekwon, Benny the Butcher, Conway the Machine	The Emperor's New Clothes
"YouUgly"	2025	JID	God Does Like Ugly
"Swank White"	2025	Joey Badass	Lonely at the Top
"Best Wishes"	2025	Jay Electronica, Hit-Boy	A Written Testimony: Power at the Rate Of My Dreams
"The Outcome"	2025	Jay Worthy, The Alchemist, Dave East, Ab-Soul	Once Upon a Time
"Hold It Down"	2025	Awich & RZA	Okinawan Wuman
"Whiskey (Release Me)"	2026	A$AP Rocky, Gorillaz	Don't Be Dumb
"Price Tag"	2026	Nick Grant	Smile
"Killoffseason"	2026	Smoke DZA, Currensy, Max B	—N/a
"Red Mullet (Sonnyjim Remix)"	2026	Sonnyjim	—N/a
"Marathon or Race"	2026	Rome Streetz	Sock It 2 My Pocket
"Crown"	2026	Denzel Curry, Kenneth Blume	II

== Music videos ==
As lead artist
Year	Album	Title	Director	Featured artist
2015	Flygod	Mr. T	One Dream Films	
2016	There's God and There's Flygod, Praise Both	Peter Luger	One Dream Films	
2016	Hitler Wears Hermes 4	Summerslam 88	n/c	
2016	Flygod	Over Gold	One Dream Films	Meyhem Lauren
2020	Pray For Paris	Euro Step	The Wizard	
2020	Pray For Paris	Allah Sent Me	The Wizard	Benny The Butcher, Conway The Machine
2021	WHO MADE THE SUNSHINE	Liz Loves Luger	Chariot Pictures	Armani Caesar
2021	Hitler Wears Hermes 8	Julia Lang	Revenxnt	
2022	10	FlyGod Jr	The Daily Gems	Doe Boy, DJ Drama
2022	10	Mac Don't Stop & Nigo Louis	n/c	
2022	10	Peppas	The Daily Gems	Black Star
2023	10	Super Kick Party	The Daily Gems	
2023	10	BDP	The Daily Gems	Rome Streetz, Stove God Cooks

As featured artist
Year	Artist	Title	Director	Other featured artists
2016	Conway the Machine	Rex Ryan	Mobile Kitchen Sound	Roc Marciano
2019	DJ Premier	Headlines	Jason Goldwatch	Conway The Machine, Benny the Butcher
2020	RMR	Welfare	Cameron Dean	
2021	Mach-Hommy	Folie à Deux	The Daily Gems	Keisha Plum
2021	Brady Watt	The Narcissist	Jim Warren & Alexandra Derderian	DJ Premier
2022	Conway The Machine	John Woo Flick	Langston Sessoms	Benny the Butcher
2022	Meyhem Lauren	Trigger Point Therapy	n/c	
2023	Talib Kweli & Madlib	Richies Part Two	Unjust	Roc Marciano
2023	DJ Premier	Runway	DJ Premier	Rome Streetz
