= Still Praying =

- Original cover art

Mixtape by Westside Gunn and DJ Drama
- Released: November 1, 2024
- Recorded: 2023–24
- Genre: Hip-hop
- Length: 37:21
- Label: Griselda
- Producers: Denny Laflare; DJ Muggs; JR Swiftz; Conductor Williams; Daringer

Westside Gunn chronology
11 (2024)	Still Praying (2024)	12 (2025)

DJ Drama chronology
I Am M Dot Taylor "Gangsta Grillz" (2024)	Still Praying (2024)

Still Praying is the fifteenth mixtape by American rapper Westside Gunn, narrated by DJ Drama. It was released on November 1, 2024, by Griselda Records, and features guest appearances from Conway the Machine, Benny the Butcher, Boldy James, Stove God Cooks, Rome Streetz, Brother Tom Sos, and Westside Pootie, the latter being Westside Gunn's daughter.

== Background and promotion ==
On October 13, 2023, Westside Gunn released his fifth studio album, And Then You Pray for Me, to favorable reviews. After its release, Still Praying began development as the third and final installment in a thematic trilogy, following Pray for Paris (2020) and And Then You Pray for Me (2023).

On October 31, 2024, Westside Gunn released his EP, 11, the day before the release of Still Praying. As he comments about the mixtape on Complex, "Some paintings are masterpieces, and this just happens to be one. I wanted to show everybody not only am I the best curator; but I can also rap my ass off." He also commented on Hypebeast that 11 is dedicated to his friend, who was murdered in April. In promotion of the mixtape after its release, the Heels Have Eyes 3 event took place in Chicago on November 2, 2024, promoted by Fourth Rope.

The album cover of Still Praying features the late American WWE and WCW professional wrestler, Sid Eudy, who died of cancer at the age of 63, on August 26, 2024.

== Tracks ==
The first track, "Waly Fay", is a jazz rap instrumental with saxophones and horns. The second track, "Justin Roberts", is named after the professional ring announcer signed to All Elite Wrestling (AEW), with the rapper imitates Roberts by introducing Westside Gunn. On the third track, "Beef Bar", Westside Gunn shows braggadocio over a "spacey piano loop and punchy drums," bringing up Fortnite and Diddy later in the track: “Last week, I threw Max out the Battle Royale / Caught him slippin’ ’cause of all the baby oil.” The title of "Beef Bar" comes from the restaurant of the same name located at a Four Seasons Hotel in Athens, Greece.

The fourth and fifth tracks, "Max Caster" and "Dr. Britt Baker", refer to professional wrestlers signed to Westside Gunn's wrestling company, Fourth Rope. The former track is a two-note piano-loop that gives a shoutout to Donald Trump with the line, "[They] got a free comma from Trump," referring to checks he received during his presidency. The latter track features Brother Tom Sos under a melodic chorus and verse, based on being the newest member of Griselda Records at the time.

The sixth track, "I Know Verdy", contains a drum-heavy loop with common themes of luxury. Westside Gunn's verse is later cut by gunshots, with the beat switching to an electric bass instrumental. The seventh track, "Speedy 40", contains a pitched-down and slowed chorus, while the eighth track, "Duran Duran", is based on Westside Gunn's drug dealing past and refers to Jeff Hardy, a former WWE wrestler who had struggles with substance abuse. On the ninth track, "Runaway Pieces at the Last Supper", Westside Gunn compared himself to Leonardo da Vinci on a piano loop, claiming himself and da Vinci as "both artists of the century."

The tenth track, "Bike Air Interlude", is a spoken word track from A.A. Rashid, a consistent collaborator of Westside Gunn. The eleventh track, "Free Shots", features Conway the Machine under a dazed, chopped vocal sample. The twelfth track, "Still Praying", also being the same name as the album, is a seven-minute track featuring verses from Benny the Butcher, Boldy James, Conway the Machine, and Stove God Cooks. On the thirteenth track, "Underground King", Westside Pootie, Westside Gunn's daughter, makes an appearance by singing "the heels have eyes," while Westside Gunn crows himself "king of the underground scene." The end of the track features Rome Streetz. The fourteenth and final track, "Lesalle Station", refers to a metro rail station in Buffalo, New York.

The mixtape is narrated by DJ Drama, American disc jockey (DJ), record executive and music promoter, who shouts on each song of the mixtape.

== Critical reception ==
Professional ratings
Review scores
Source	Rating
Clash	8/10
Hive	4/5 stars

Still Praying received mixed reviews. As Kevin Stovich spoke of the album, "Still Praying falls short of the extremely ornamented and lavish beats of Gunn’s previous two albums. While most of the songs don’t break the two-and-a-half-minute mark, many of them overstay their welcome with overly spacey production, whereas others don’t seem to last long enough." Marzia Thomas of Slugmag gives a mixed-to-negative review about the mixtape: "Honestly, my main complaint about Still Praying is that no part of it employs Gunn’s ingenuity. The production could be a bit tighter but it borders on whimsical. The swanky sonic experience is a classic atmosphere that harkens the image of a glass coffee table in a Best Western lobby." He considers that Westside Gunn is "staring down the barrel of excessive production and lack of innovation."

Meanwhile, Robin Murray of Clash gives it a positive review with an 8/10. "Underground hip-hop at its finest, Still Praying signals a new chapter from a hugely individual voice. Different artists, but we’re put in mind of Ka, and his Brooklyn tales – few have conjured the specifics of a place, in both detail and emotion, like Westside Gunn." Alfie Clark of Hive Magazine gives the mixtape 4 out of 5 stars. "Whilst Still Praying isn’t as good as some of his best projects, like Pray For Paris or Supreme Blientele, nor do I think it hits the heights that And Then You Pray For Me does on certain tracks, I still found myself thoroughly enjoy rapping about these scenarios that I know I’ll never experience over some luscious instrumentals."

== Track listing ==
Credits adapted from Tidal

All tracks are written by Westside Gunn and DJ Drama, excluding "Bike Air Interlude", solely featuring A.A. Rashid.

Still Praying track listing
No.	Title	Producer	Length
1.	"Waly Fay"	Denny Laflare	0:37
2.	"Justin Roberts"	Denny Laflare	0:52
3.	"Beef Bar"	Denny Laflare	3:44
4.	"Max Caster"	Denny Laflare	2:16
5.	"Dr. Britt Baker" (featuring Brother Tom Sos)	DJ Muggs	5:09
6.	"I Know Verdy"	Crucial Guillotine	2:10
7.	"Speedy 40"	Daringer	2:32
8.	"Duran Duran"	JR Swiftz	2:15
9.	"Runaway Pieces at the Last Supper"	Denny Laflare	2:04
10.	"Bike Air Interlude"	DJ Muggs	0:42
11.	"Free Shots" (featuring Conway the Machine)	Conductor Williams	2:34
12.	"Still Praying" (featuring Benny the Butcher, Boldy James, Conway the Machine, and Stove God Cooks)		6:57
13.	"Underground King" (featuring Rome Streetz and Westside Pootie)		3:47
14.	"Lesalle Station"	JR Swiftz	1:34
Total length:			37:21
