= Tana Talk 4 =

Studio album by Benny the Butcher
- Released: March 11, 2022
- Recorded: 2021
- Genre: East Coast hip-hop
- Length: 40:00
- Labels: Griselda; Black Soprano Family; Empire
- Producers: The Alchemist; Beat Butcha; Daringer

Benny the Butcher chronology
Burden of Proof (2020)	Tana Talk 4 (2022)	Everybody Can't Go (2024)

Singles from Tana Talk 4
- 1. "Johnny P's Caddy" Released: January 28, 2022; 2. "10 More Commandments" Released: March 10, 2022

Professional ratings
Aggregate scores
Source	Rating
Metacritic	78/100
Review scores
Source	Rating
AllMusic	4/5 stars
Exclaim!	8/10
Pitchfork	7.0/10

Tana Talk 4 is the third studio album by American rapper Benny the Butcher. It was released on March 11, 2022, through Griselda Records and Black Soprano Family and distributed by Empire Distribution. It is the fourth installment in his Tana Talk series, following up the 2018 album Tana Talk 3. The album was produced by the Alchemist, Daringer and Beat Butcha. It features guest appearances by labelmates Conway the Machine and Westside Gunn and other appearances by J. Cole, Diddy, Stove God Cooks, Boldy James, and 38 Spesh.

== Background ==
The name of the album is a reference to Montana Avenue in Buffalo, New York. Depicted from left to right, the cover is a painting of his deceased older brother, Machine Gun Black, Benny, and Westside Gunn.

== Singles ==
On January 28, 2022, Benny the Butcher released the lead single "Johnny P's Caddy" with J. Cole. On March 11, 2022, he released the album’s second single, "10 More Commandments", which features Diddy and which is inspired by "Ten Crack Commandments" by The Notorious B.I.G., released in 1997.

== Track listing ==
Credits adapted from Spotify.

Tana Talk 4 track listing
No.	Title	Writer(s)	Producer(s)	Length
1.	"Johnny P's Caddy" (with J. Cole)	Jeremie Pennick; Jermaine Lamarr Cole; Daniel Maman	The Alchemist	3:45
2.	"Back 2x" (featuring Stove God Cooks)	Pennick; Thomas Paladino; Beat Butcha; Aaron Scott	Daringer; Beat Butcha	3:50
3.	"Super Plug"	Pennick; Maman	The Alchemist	3:29
4.	"Weekends in the Perry's" (featuring Boldy James)	Pennick; Maman; James Clay Jones III	The Alchemist	3:09
5.	"10 More Commandments" (featuring Diddy)	Pennick; Paldino; Beat Butcha; Sean Combs	Daringer; Beat Butcha	3:59
6.	"Tyson vs. Ali" (featuring Conway the Machine)	Pennick; Paldino; Demond Price	Daringer	4:09
7.	"Uncle Bun" (featuring 38 Spesh)	Pennick; Paldino; Justin Harrell	Daringer	2:42
8.	"Thowy's Revenge"	Pennick; Maman	The Alchemist	3:00
9.	"Billy Joe"	Pennick; Maman	The Alchemist	3:24
10.	"Guerrero" (featuring Westside Gunn)	Pennick; Paldino; Beat Butcha; Alvin Lamar Worthy	Daringer; Beat Butcha	3:05
11.	"Bust a Brick Nick"	Pennick; Maman	The Alchemist	3:45
12.	"Mr. Chow Hall"	Pennick; Maman	The Alchemist	2:15
Total length:				40:00

== Charts ==
Chart performance for Tana Talk 4
Chart (2022)	Peak position
UK R&B Albums (Official Charts)	13
US Billboard 200	22
US Top R&B/Hip-Hop Albums (Billboard)	12
US Independent Albums (Billboard)	6
