= Griselda Records =

American hip-hop record label

- Founded: 2012; 14 years ago
- Founder: Westside Gunn; Conway the Machine; Mach-Hommy
- Distributors: Daupe!; EMPIRE
- Genre: East Coast hip-hop; boom bap
- Country of origin: United States
- Location: Buffalo, New York, US
- Official website: griseldaxfr.com

Griselda Records (also Griselda x Fashion Rebels; GXFR) is an American independent Hip-hop record label based in Buffalo, New York. It was founded by rapper Westside Gunn, his brother Conway the Machine, and Mach-Hommy in 2012. In addition to the founding members, Benny the Butcher and in-house producer Daringer make up the flagship artists of the Griselda Records roster.

The name Griselda comes from drug lord Griselda Blanco. "Griselda" also refers to a loose-knit hip-hop collective composed of the core signees of the label, amongst others. The collective's de facto leader is the label's founder Westside Gunn. To date, Griselda has two releases as a collective: the extended play Don't Get Scared Now in 2016 and debut album WWCD in 2019.

== History ==
Beginning in the label's formative years, physical copies of the label's music were distributed in limited releases by London label Daupe! that often sold out within minutes. In 2017, Griselda signed a distribution deal with Shady Records for artists Westside Gunn and Conway, which ended when both left the label in 2020 and 2022. In 2019, Westside Gunn and Benny the Butcher signed a management deal with Jay-Z's entertainment company Roc Nation.

In 2021, Benny and Gunn produced and starred in the crime film Conflicted (2021).

== Artists ==
=== Current acts ===
- Armani Caesar
- Benny the Butcher
- Boldy James
- Brother Tom Sos
- Dissension
- Estee Nack
- Jay Worthy
- Rome Streetz
- Stove God Cooks
- Westside Gunn
- YN Billy

=== Former acts ===
- Conway the Machine
- Elcamino
- Mach-Hommy
- Tha God Fahim

=== In-house producers ===
- Camoflauge Monk
- Conductor Williams
- Daringer
- Denny LaFlare

== Discography ==
=== Studio albums ===
Artist	Album	Release date
Westside Gunn	Flygod (released with Empire)	March 11, 2016
Mach-Hommy	H.B.O. (Haitian Body Odor)	September 15, 2016
Westside Gunn	Supreme Blientele (released with Empire)	June 22, 2018
Benny the Butcher	Tana Talk 3 (released with Black Soprano Family and Empire)	November 23, 2018
Griselda	WWCD (released with Shady and Interscope)	November 29, 2019
Westside Gunn	Pray for Paris (released with Empire)	April 17, 2020
Boldy James	The Versace Tape (released with Empire)	August 14, 2020
Conway the Machine	From King to a God (released with Drumwork and Empire)	September 11, 2020
Armani Caesar	The Liz (released with Empire)	September 18, 2020
Westside Gunn	Who Made the Sunshine (released with Shady and Interscope)	October 2, 2020
Benny the Butcher	Burden of Proof (released with Empire)	October 16, 2020
Mach-Hommy	Pray for Haiti (released with Empire)	May 21, 2021
Conway the Machine	God Don't Make Mistakes (released with Drumwork, Shady and Interscope)	February 25, 2022
Benny the Butcher	Tana Talk 4 (released with Empire)	March 11, 2022
Rome Streetz	Kiss the Ring (released with Empire)	September 30, 2022
Armani Caesar	The Liz 2 (released with Empire)	October 21, 2022
Estee Nack	Nacksaw Jim Duggan (released with Empire)	May 19, 2023
Westside Gunn	And Then You Pray for Me (released with Empire)	October 13, 2023
Jay Worthy	Once Upon a Time (released with GDF & Empire)	September 26, 2025
Jay Worthy	Once Upon a Time 2 (released with GDF & Empire)	October 10, 2025
Jay Worthy	Once Upon a Time: The Soundtrack (released with GDF & Empire)	May 1, 2026

=== Soundtrack albums ===
Artist	Album	Release date
Griselda & BSF	Conflicted (Original Motion Picture Soundtrack) (released with Black Soprano Family and Empire)	January 8, 2021

=== EPs ===
Artist	Album	Release date
Westside Gunn & The Purist	Roses Are Red... So Is Blood	January 28, 2016
Griselda	Don't Get Scared Now	May 13, 2016
Westside Gunn	There's God and There's Flygod, Praise Both	July 19, 2016
Conway the Machine & Prodigy	Hell Still on Earth	September 12, 2016
Benny the Butcher	17 Bullets (released with Black Soprano Family)	December 26, 2016
Westside Gunn, Daringer & Westside Pootie	Raw Is Rawgod	April 28, 2017
Elcamino	Elcamino (released with Anti Gun Violence)	November 11, 2017
Westside Gunn & MF Doom	Westside Doom (released with Empire)	November 13, 2017
Benny the Butcher	A Friend of Ours (released with Black Soprano Family)	June 1, 2018
Benny the Butcher	The Plugs I Met (released with Black Soprano Family)	June 21, 2019
Benny the Butcher & Smoke DZA	Statue of Limitations (released with R.F.C. Music Group and Black Soprano Family)	October 18, 2019
Conway the Machine & The Alchemist	Lulu (released with Drumwork, ALC and Empire)	March 30, 2020
Benny the Butcher & Harry Fraud	The Plugs I Met 2 (released with Black Soprano Family and SRFSCHL)	March 19, 2021
Conway the Machine	The Missing Bricks (released with Drumwork)	October 1, 2021
Westside Gunn	11 (released with Empire)	October 31, 2024
Westside Gunn	Heels Have Eyes (released with Empire)	April 18, 2025
Westside Gunn	My Sauconys Glowin	December 5, 2025
Benny the Butcher	The Plugs I Met 2.5 (released with Black Soprano Family)	June 25, 2026

=== Mixtapes ===
Artist	Album	Release date
Westside Gunn	Hitler Wears Hermes	October 26, 2012
Conway the Machine	Physikal Therapy	February 24, 2014
Westside Gunn	Hitler Wears Hermes II	September 22, 2014
Westside Gunn & Conway the Machine	Hall & Nash	March 9, 2015
Conway the Machine	The Devil's Reject	April 27, 2015
Westside Gunn	Hitler Wears Hermes III	August 3, 2015
Westside Gunn, Conway the Machine & Big Ghost Ltd	Griselda Ghost (released with Big Ghost Ltd)	September 11, 2015
Conway the Machine	Reject 2	October 30, 2015
Conway the Machine	50 Round Drum	April 14, 2016
Conway the Machine	El Patron	October 5, 2016
Benny the Butcher	My First Brick (released with Black Soprano Family)	October 8, 2016
Westside Gunn	Hitler Wears Hermes IV	October 31, 2016
Conway the Machine	Machinery (Vol. 1)	November 14, 2016
Westside Gunn & DJ Green Lantern	Hitler on Steroids	March 8, 2017
Conway the Machine & DJ Green Lantern	Reject on Steroids	May 24, 2017
Conway the Machine & DJ Green Lantern	More Steroids	October 19, 2017
Westside Gunn	Hitler Wears Hermes V	October 31, 2017
Benny the Butcher & DJ Green Lantern	Butcher on Steroids (released with Black Soprano Family)	November 27, 2017
Conway the Machine	G.O.A.T.	December 21, 2017
Benny the Butcher & 38 Spesh	Stabbed & Shot (released with Black Soprano Family and Trust)	February 16, 2018
Conway the Machine	Blakk Tape	March 27, 2018
Elcamino	Walking on Water (released with Anti Gun Violence)	August 16, 2018
Conway the Machine	Everybody Is F.O.O.D.	August 20, 2018
Westside Gunn	The Almighty (released with Empire)	September 15, 2018
Westside Gunn	Hitler Wears Hermes VI (released with Empire)	October 31, 2018
Conway the Machine	EIF 2: Eat What U Kill	December 10, 2018
Conway the Machine	Everybody Is F.O.O.D. 3	April 4, 2019
Westside Gunn	Fourth Rope	April 12, 2019
Westside Gunn	Flygod Is an Awesome God (released with Empire)	July 5, 2019
Conway the Machine	Look What I Became (released with Drumwork and Empire)	September 13, 2019
Westside Gunn	Hitler Wears Hermes VII (released with Empire)	November 1, 2019
Westside Gunn	Flyest Nig@@ in Charge Vol. 1 (re-released with Empire)	January 3, 2020
Westside Gunn	Flygod Is an Awesome God 2 (released with Empire)	July 3, 2020
Conway the Machine	La Maquina (released with Drumwork and Empire)	April 16, 2021
Westside Gunn	Hitler Wears Hermes VIII: Sincerely, Adolf (released with Empire)	August 27, 2021
Westside Gunn	Hitler Wears Hermes VIII: Side B (released with Empire)	September 24, 2021
Westside Gunn	Peace "Fly" God (released with Empire)	July 8, 2022
Westside Gunn	10 (released with Empire)	October 28, 2022
Westside Gunn, Conway the Machine & The Alchemist	Hall & Nash 2: The Original Version (released with Drumwork, ALC and Empire)	December 29, 2023
Westside Gunn & DJ Drama	Still Praying (released with Empire)	November 1, 2024
Westside Gunn	12 (released with Empire)	February 14, 2025
YN Billy	Redville 2	May 30, 2025
Westside Gunn	Heels Have Eyes 2	August 28, 2025
Westside Gunn	Heels Have Eyes 3	October 31, 2025

== Awards and nominations ==
Year	Organization	Award	Result
2020	BET Awards	Best Group	Nominated

== See also ==
- 38 Spesh (born 1984), frequent collaborator with Griselda artists
- DJ Shay (c. 1972–2021), frequent collaborator with Griselda artists
- Isaac Pelayo (born c. 1996), frequent collaborator with Griselda artists
- Roc Marciano (born 1978), frequent collaborator with Griselda artists
