= Conflicted (film) =

2021 American film by Amire K. Reed

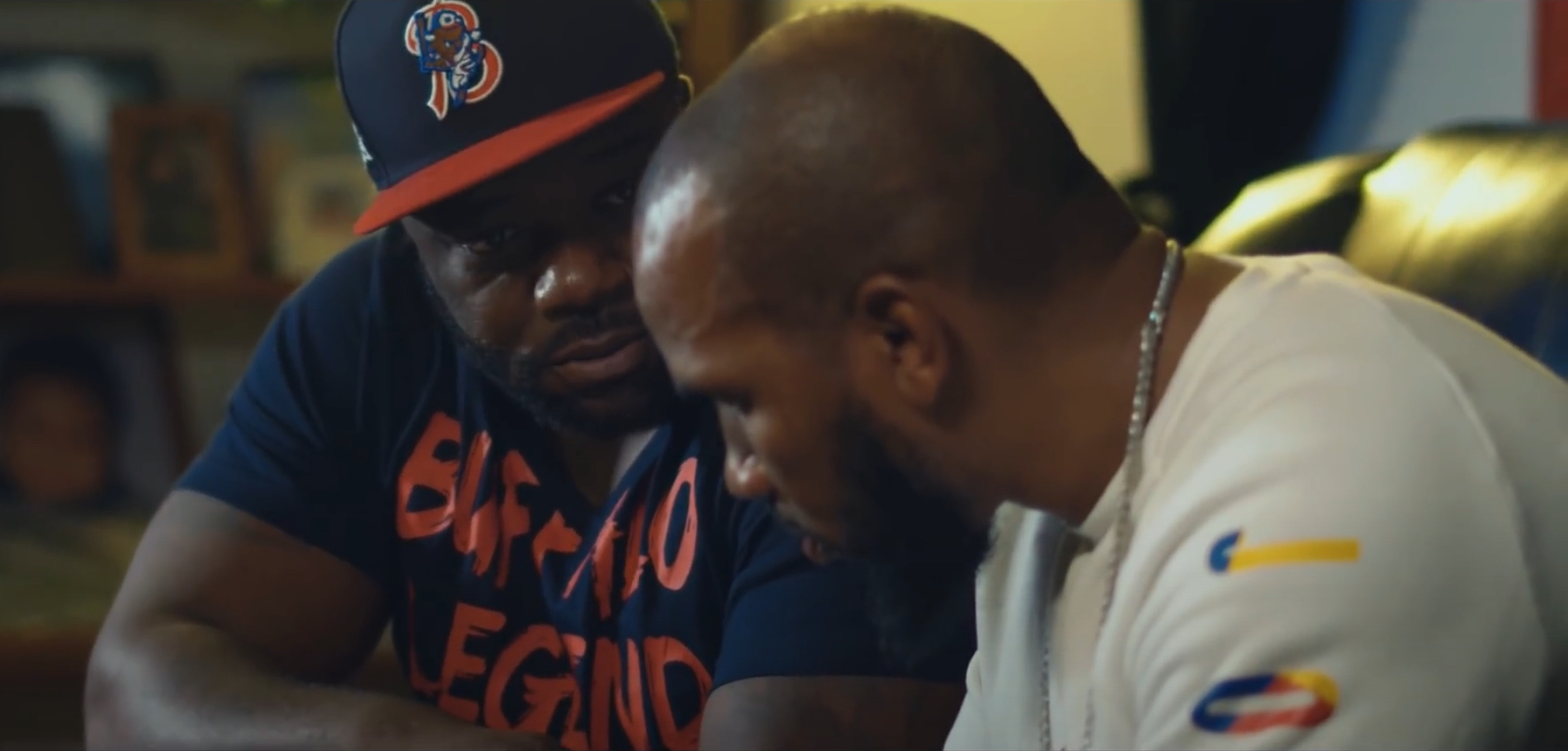
- Shot from the Conflicted official trailer, 2021
- Directed by: Amire K. Reed
- Written by: Duece King
- Produced by: Benny the Butcher (exec.); Westside Gunn; Duece King
- Starring: Benny the Butcher; Westside Gunn
- Music by: WillieStaxx
- Release date: January 15, 2021
- Country: United States
- Language: English

Conflicted is a 2021 American crime drama film by Amire K. Reed and written by Duece King. It stars Griselda rappers Benny the Butcher and Westside Gunn.

Released January 15, 2021, the film originally priced at $25 for a digital copy, but was later added to Amazon Prime Video. Westside Gunn received backlash after saying if one could not afford the film, they should "stop fuckin wit Griselda".

== Reception ==
Tom Breihan of Stereogum gave the film a mixed review, saying: "I probably had more fun thinking about the movie than I did watching it. It's fun to think about, though. And if the rap-crew movie returns, that'll be fun, too".

Uproxx also gave the film a mixed review.

== Soundtrack ==
A soundtrack album was announced in December 2020, and was released one week before the film, titled Griselda & BSF: Conflicted (Original Motion Picture Soundtrack) Album. It contained features from Armani Caesar, Boldy James, Dave East, Lloyd Banks and Smoke DZA. It received a 6.7 from Pitchfork.

== Cast ==
- Benny the Butcher as Nick
- J. Holiday as Kam
- Michael Rapaport as Mike
- Westside Gunn as himself
