= Who Made the Sunshine =

2020 album by Westside Gunn

Studio album by Westside Gunn
- Released: October 2, 2020
- Recorded: 2020
- Genre: Hip-hop
- Length: 40:03
- Labels: Griselda; Shady; Interscope
- Producers: The Alchemist; Daringer; Beat Butcha; Conductor Williams; Just Blaze

Westside Gunn chronology
Flygod Is an Awesome God 2 (2020)	Who Made the Sunshine (2020)	Hitler Wears Hermes 8: Sincerely Adolf (2021)

Who Made the Sunshine (stylized in all caps) is the fourth album by the American rapper Westside Gunn. It was released on October 2, 2020, by Griselda, Interscope, and Shady Records, and served as Gunn's only release by Shady Records.

Production on the album was primarily handled by Beat Butcha and Daringer, except for four tracks, which were produced by the Alchemist, Conductor Williams, and Just Blaze. It features guest appearances from Benny the Butcher, Conway the Machine, Slick Rick, Black Thought, Boldy James, Busta Rhymes, Smoke DZA, Jadakiss, El Camino, Armani Caesar, Estee Nack, Flee Lord, Keisha Plum, and Stove God Cooks. The album was not released on physical media.

== Background ==
The album was originally scheduled to be released on August 28, 2020, however, it was postponed due to the COVID-19 death of Griselda's in-house record producer DJ Shay.

== Critical reception ==
Professional ratings
Aggregate scores
Source	Rating
Metacritic	76/100
Review scores
Source	Rating
Beats Per Minute	77%
Clash	7/10
Consequence of Sound	B
HipHopDX	4/5
Pitchfork	6.7/10

Who Made the Sunshine was met with generally positive reviews from critics. At Metacritic, which assigns a normalized rating out of 100 to reviews from mainstream publications, the album received an average score of 76 based on five reviews.

Chase McMullen of Beats Per Minute rated the album a 77%, saying "Who Made The Sunshine’s already underrated duality: it’s both grand introduction and complacent victory lap; both urgent and laid back, all at once, constantly". A Clash reviewer rated it a 7/10, saying "Who Made The Sunshine feels like a fresh slate for the Buffalo artist. [...] it contains some of his best work". Jayson Buford of Consequence rated it a B, saying "when the beats sound this good and the bars are cold like ashy knuckles, there's nothing to wait on". Riley Wallace of HipHopDX rated it a 4/5, saying "Who Made the Sunshine is a solid offering, even if not Gunn’s most wholly compelling body of work". Alphonse Pierre of Pitchfork rated it a 6.7/10, saying "Who Made the Sunshine falls somewhere in the middle, and doesn’t feel like it was devised to be anything more than what it is: another step toward the expansion of the Griselda Records brand".

== Track listing ==
No.	Title	Writer(s)	Producer(s)	Length
1.	"Sunshine Intro" (featuring AA Rashid)	Alvin Worthy; Ahmad Abdullah Rashid; Thomas Paladino; Eliot Dubock	Daringer; Beat Butcha	2:25
2.	"The Butcher and The Blade" (featuring Benny the Butcher and Conway the Machine)	Worthy; Jeremie Pennick; Demond Price; Paladino; Dubock	Daringer; Beat Butcha	3:59
3.	"Ishkabibble's" (featuring Black Thought)	Worthy; Tariq Trotter; Paladino; Dubock	Daringer; Beat Butcha	2:54
4.	"All Praises" (featuring Boldy James and Jadakiss)	Worthy; James Jones III; Jason Phillips; Daniel Maman	The Alchemist	3:26
5.	"Big Basha's"	Worthy; Paladino; Dubock	Daringer; Beat Butcha	1:41
6.	"Liz Loves Luger" (featuring Armani Caesar)	Worthy; Joclynn Clyburn; Maman	The Alchemist	3:21
7.	"Ocean Prime" (featuring Slick Rick and Busta Rhymes)	Worthy; Ricky M.L. Walters; Trevor Smith, Jr.; Paladino; Dubock	Daringer; Beat Butcha	2:37
8.	"Lessie" (featuring Keisha Plum)	Worthy; Paladino; Dubock; Amber Croskey	Daringer; Beat Butcha	3:28
9.	"Frank Murphy" (featuring Stove God Cooks, Estee Nack, Flee Lord, El Camino, and Smoke DZA)	Worthy; David Cordova; Alex Rosario; Demetrius Jackson, Jr.; Sean Pompey; Denzel Williams; Aaron Scott	Conductor Williams	8:11
10.	"Good Night" (featuring Slick Rick)	Worthy; Walters; Paladino; Dubock	Daringer; Beat Butcha	3:55
11.	"98 Sabres" (featuring Armani Caesar, Conway the Machine, and Benny the Butcher)	Worthy; Clyburn; Price; Pennick; Justin Smith	Just Blaze	4:06
Total length:				40:03

== Personnel ==
- Westside Gunn – vocals (all tracks)
- Conway the Machine – vocals (tracks 2, 11)
- Benny the Butcher – vocals (tracks 2, 11)
- The Alchemist – production (tracks 4, 6)
- Just Blaze – production (track 11)
- Armani Caesar – vocals (tracks 6, 11)
- Keisha Plum – vocals (track 8)
- Jadakiss – vocals (track 4)
- A.A. Rashid – vocals (track 1)
- Estee Nack – vocals (track 9)
- Stove God Cooks – vocals (track 9)
- Smoke DZA – vocals (track 9)
- Black Thought – vocals (track 3)
- Boldy James – vocals (track 4)
- Flee Lord – vocals (track 9)
- El Camino – vocals (track 9)
- Slick Rick – vocals (tracks 7, 10)
- Busta Rhymes – vocals (track 7)
- Young Guru – mixing, mastering
- Daringer – production (all tracks)
- Beat Butcha – additional production (all tracks)
- Brandon Burton – recording
- Víctor Hugo Orozco – art direction

== Charts ==
Chart (2020)	Peak position
US Current Album Sales (Billboard)	64
