= Kiss the Ring (Rome Streetz album) =

2022 studio album by Rome Streetz

Studio album by Rome Streetz
- Released: September 30, 2022
- Genre: Hip-hop
- Label: Griselda; Empire
- Producer: The Alchemist; Camoflauge Monk; Conductor Williams; Daringer; Denny Laflare; DJ Green Lantern; SadhuGold; Sovren

Kiss the Ring (stylized in all caps) is the fourth studio album by American rapper Rome Streetz. It was released on September 30, 2022, by Griselda Records and Empire Distribution. It contains features from Armani Caesar, Benny the Butcher, Boldy James, Conway the Machine, Stove God Cooks and Westside Gunn, while production was handled by the Alchemist, Camoflauge Monk, Conductor Williams, Daringer, Denny Laflare, DJ Green Lantern, SadhuGold and Sovren.

In 2023, Rome Streetz went on the Kiss the Ring Tour to perform the album.

== Reception ==
Kiss the Ring received generally positive reviews from critics. It received a 7.3 from Pitchfork, with Pete Tosiello saying: "the lack of purpose beleaguers [Kiss the Ring's] lesser moments, even if Kiss the Ring is one of the best pound-for-pound rap outings of the year". Grant Jones of Rap Reviews gave the album a 7, writing: "Kiss the Ring felt like a hard sell because it plays out like the most Griselda of all Griselda releases. The rapping is perfectly fine and the production is serviceable if not always memorable." Chase McMullen of Beats Per Minute wrote: "This is an album that takes no prisoners, nor even considers doing so. You're going to get knock out beat after knock out beat, guided by Streetz' precise lyricism. The production manages variety even amidst the fireshow".

It was ranked 23 on Rolling Stone's top 25 albums of 2022 list.

== Track listing ==
All tracks are written by Rome Streetz.

No.	Title	Music	Length
1.	"Big Steppa"	Camoflauge Monk	2:43
2.	"Heart On Froze"	Conductor Williams	2:07
3.	"In Too Deep"	Conductor Williams	3:25
4.	"Soulja Boy (featuring Conway the Machine)"	Conductor Williams	2:57
5.	"Tyson Beckford"	Daringer	3:00
6.	"Destiny Child"	Denny Laflare	2:49
7.	"Blow 4 Blow" (featuring Benny the Butcher and Stove God Cooks)	Conductor Williams	4:03
8.	"Ugly Balenciaga's"	Conductor Williams	2:06
9.	"1000 Ecstasy"	Conductor Williams	2:40
10.	"Armed & Dangerous" (featuring Armani Caesar)	DJ Green Lantern	3:43
11.	"Cry Champagne"	Camoflauge Monk	2:51
12.	"Non Factor" (featuring Westside Gunn)	Camoflauge Monk	3:24
13.	"Long Story Short"	The Alchemist	2:22
14.	"Serving" (featuring Boldy James)	Denny Laflare	2:30
15.	"Reversible"	Conductor Williams	3:21
16.	"Fashion Rebel"	SadhuGold; Sovren	3:47
17.	"Kiss the Ring"	Denny Laflare	2:12
Total length:			50:00
