= 10 (mixtape) =

2022 mixtape by Westside Gunn

Mixtape by Westside Gunn
- Released: October 28, 2022
- Genre: Hip-hop
- Length: 49:56
- Labels: Griselda, Empire

Westside Gunn chronology
Peace "Fly" God (2022)	10 (2022)	And Then You Pray for Me (2023)

10 (alternatively Ten, sometimes Hitler Wears Hermes 10) is the fourteenth mixtape by American rapper Westside Gunn. Released October 28, 2022, through Griselda Records and Empire Distribution, it received positive reviews from critics. It contains guest appearances from Armani Caesar, ASAP Rocky, Benny the Butcher, Black Star, Busta Rhymes, Conway the Machine, DJ Drama, Doe Boy, Ghostface Killah, Jay Worthy, Raekwon, Robby Takac, Rome Streetz, Run the Jewels and Stove God Cooks, among others.

== Background ==
Despite having the series' moniker removed, 10 is the tenth installment in Westside Gunn's Hitler Wears Hermes mixtape series. It was reputedly the final installment in the series, but was later followed by 11—an EP—in 2024, and 12 in 2025. Gunn posted the album's cover art on his Instagram on October 24, 2022, announcing an October 28 release. On January 20, 2023, Gunn began his God Is Love Tour—his first international tour, which is named for the song on the album.

The cover depicts Eastside Flip (died September 3, 2026; aged 36)—a wheelchair-using cocaine-dependent homeless friend of Gunn from Buffalo, New York, who often freestyled—wearing $500,000 of diamond jewelry, including a bracelet, wristwatch and MF Doom chain, inside a bodega. Flip also appeared in the music video for "Super Kick Party", which he dances in.

== Reception ==
Robert Blair of HotNewHipHop said "[10] is a project which reasserts the otherworldly artistic vision that Gunn possesses that made him into a phenomenon in the first place". Dylan Hammock of the Baltimore Post-Examiner (successor to The Baltimore Examiner) rated the album an 8.5/10.

== Track listing ==
All tracks are written by Westside Gunn, with exception to "Intro", which is solely A.A. Rashid.

No.	Title	Music	Length
1.	"Intro" (featuring A.A. Rashid)	RZA	3:03
2.	"Flygod Jr." (featuring Doe Boy)	Flygod Jr.	3:23
3.	"Super Kick Party"	Conductor Williams
4.	"Shootouts in Soho" (featuring ASAP Rocky and Stove God Cooks)	Denny Laflare	3:30
5.	"Peppas" (featuring Black Star)	Conductor Williams	4:05
6.	"Nigo Louis" (featuring Westside Pootie)	Elijah Hooks, Denny Laflare	3:12
7.	"BDP" (featuring Rome Streetz and Stove God Cooks)	Conductor Williams	2:51
8.	"Science Class" (featuring Busta Rhymes, Ghostface Killah, Raekwon, and Stove God Cooks)	Swizz Beatz	4:57
9.	"God Is Love" (featuring Estee Nack, Keisha Plum, and Stove God Cooks)	Conductor Williams	5:22
10.	"Switches on Everything" (featuring Run the Jewels and Stove God Cooks)	Mike Shabb	3:31
11.	"Mac Don't Stop"	Pete Rock	2:34
12.	"Red Death" (featuring Benny the Butcher, Rome Streetz, Stove God Cooks, Armani Caesar, Robby Takac, Conway the Machine, and Jay Worthy)	The Alchemist	10:23
Total length:			49:56

== Charts ==
Chart performance for 10
Chart (2022)	Peak position
US Billboard 200	183
US Independent Albums (Billboard)	29
