= Everybody Can't Go =

Studio album by Benny the Butcher
- Released: January 26, 2024
- Recorded: 2022–2023
- Studio: Chalice Recording Studios
- Genres: Hardcore hip-hop; underground hip-hop; contemporary hip-hop
- Length: 40:17
- Labels: 5 to 50; Def Jam
- Producers: The Alchemist; Corbett; Hit-Boy

Benny the Butcher chronology
Tana Talk 4 (2022)	Everybody Can't Go (2024)	Stabbed & Shot 2 (2024)

Singles from Everybody Can't Go
- 1. "Big Dog" Released: November 3, 2023; 2. "One Foot In" Released: December 8, 2023; 3. "Bron" Released: January 12, 2024

Everybody Can't Go is the fourth studio album by American rapper Benny the Butcher. It was released on January 26, 2024, through 5 to 50 and Def Jam Recordings. The album contains guest appearances from Armani Caesar, Babyface Ray, Conway the Machine, Jadakiss, Kyle Banks, Lil Wayne, Peezy, Rick Hyde, Snoop Dogg, Stove God Cooks, and Westside Gunn. Production was handled by The Alchemist, Corbett, and Hit-Boy.

It follows his album Tana Talk 4, which was released in 2022. It was supported by three singles: "Big Dog", "One Foot In", and "Bron". The album was a critical success, becoming his fourth album to chart on the US Billboard 200 and garnering universal acclaim from music critics.

== Background and promotion ==
The album was first teased in February 2023 following the 65th Annual Grammy Awards after which Benny had taken to his Instagram to post a picture that he captioned "Sometimes the experience of the journey is a better feeling than reaching the destination. You won't ever kno unless u make it there...but remember Everybody Can't Go. The Album produced by @hitboy...Loading". Just a month later, in March 2023, Benny and Hit-Boy previewed a track from the album. In April 2023, in an interview with DTLR, Benny announced that the album was set to release on August 11, 2023:

Man, this new project, I'm not gon lie this is the first time I even announced this anywhere because this my first interview. You know, August 11, Everybody Can't Go. Everybody Can't Go, that's the first time I announced the date publicly because they just told me like three days ago.

In June 2023, Benny revealed that he was "pissed" after not taking advantage of his song with Drake, bringing him major publicity, allowing him to further promote the release of the album. In the interview, he stated:

I was pissed, I'm not gon' lie. It's a fucking Drake record. It was my biggest record...It's a record just sitting in my pocket but I understand the mechanics of the business. I don't know [what happened] neither. I can't speak for [Drake] and his team... I got schedules. I might do a feature for somebody and they be like, "Benny, we ready to drop this Tuesday". And I'm like, "Ni**a you ain't dropping that Tuesday 'cause we holding off, I got this". That's the biggest artist in the world so I understand his release schedule might be hectic or he might have people that be like, "We can't drop that right now because we doing this". I understand that. He's the name, but he represents a lot of people that he works with and his moves affect a lot of people, so I understand that part.

In July 2023, Benny teased the album's lead single, "Big Dog" with Lil Wayne, building anticipation for the project. In August 2023, Hit-Boy announced that the album would be pushed back, noting that "it was supposed to come in August but I think it's getting pushed back". Weeks later, Benny previewed the entirety of Wayne's verse on "Big Dog". Ending October, Benny began to promote the release of "Big Dog" by wiping his Instagram page and posting a countdown while thanking fans for building anticipation to the album. In an interview with Rap Radar, Benny broke down the meaning behind the album's title:

Everybody can't go because they not cut like that. They not made like that. And you can't dance to every song, you know what I'm saying? […] Everything is not for everybody. With new levels come new devils, and I want more. I want bigger for myself. When you make that first cut — when you clearly see, "these people are not for me, they don't need to be here" — so the people who made that, who got past that cut, they think they're safe. And what I mean by level up, you know, is my way of thinking. And of course, my way of making music.

On November 3, 2023, the album's lead single, "Big Dog" with Lil Wayne was released alongside its official music video. Over a month later, on December 8, 2023, Benny released the album's second single, "One Foot In" with Stove God Cooks alongside its official music video.

On January 24, 2024, just two days prior to the release of the album, Benny took to Instagram to post the album's official tracklist, previewing features from Armani Caesar, Babyface Ray, Conway the Machine, Jadakiss, Kyle Banks, Lil Wayne, Peezy, Rick Hyde, Snoop Dogg, Stove God Cooks, and Westside Gunn to increase the hype and anticipation before the album's release.

== Recording ==
In Benny's interview with Rolling Stone, it was noted that during the recording process of the album, "his house in Buffalo burned down, he got a divorce, and his childhood friend died".

The album's first recording session was in Las Vegas before transitioning to the Hit-Boy-owned Chalice Recording Studios in Los Angeles and The Alchemist's Santa Monica studio. Benny stated that both producers were "hands-on" during the recording process and would often offer suggestions on his recording approach. Benny stated that when recording with Hit-Boy and The Alchemist, it would just be him and the producers in the studio. During his interview, he also revealed that the album took 19 months to create.

In Benny's interview with Charlamagne tha God on The Breakfast Club, he stated that in November 2023, the FBI raided his studio session in Buffalo, New York and that he is on the FBI watchlist and was being harassed by the Buffalo PD during the recording of the album.

== Critical reception ==
Professional ratings
Aggregate scores
Source	Rating
Metacritic	82/100
Review scores
Source	Rating
AllMusic	4/5 stars
Beats Per Minute	60/100%
Clash	8/10
Consequence	8.3/10
HipHopDX	4.3/5 stars
RapReviews	7/10

Everybody Can't Go received a score of 82 out of 100 on review aggregator Metacritic based on six critics' reviews, indicating "universal acclaim" reception. Beats Per Minute's Chase McMullen stated that "Benny more than excels when he's storytelling and by simply devouring verses" and that "Benny is all but absent on Everybody Can't Go". McMullen further stated that Benny draws "inspiration from Birdman and Mannie Fresh's classic run, he finally properly tears into the endless opinions regarding his ascension". Writing for Clash, Robin Murray began his review, noting that "Everybody Can't Go dials into [Benny's] core values, a frenetic display of rap excellence that carries real weight". Murray stated that "the tension between evolution and retaining his identity" makes the project "incredibly riveting". Praising the album's production, Murray concluded his review by writing that the album "utilises some fantastic production – notably from Hit-Boy – to piece together a seamless record, one that hauls his sound forwards into a fresh era". HipHopDX's Karan Singh wrote that "the LP traces the New York spitter's resilience from crippling artistic independence to signing with Def Jam and building on the label's legacy of all-time greats". Praising the project, he stated that the project "is a concoction of sharply digitized beats and eloquent instrumentation" while also stating that Benny's lyricism is a standout, and how he "presents his story unlocks new perspectives". Concluding his review, Singh wrote that the album has "few hindrances" and that "Hip Hop is in good hands with The Butcher".

Writing for RapReviews, Sy Shackleford stated that "Everybody Can't Go is a solid listen, with about two skippable tracks", however, "it doesn't stand up to previous releases". He wrote that on the record, "Benny's maintained many of the elements that contribute to his music" and that while the album "is mostly good, Benny will need to push some boundaries if he's ever going to top his classic albums". Writing for HotNewHipHop, Tallie Spencer wrote that the album "is a perfect blend of street lyricism and razor-sharp storytelling, showcasing Benny's unwavering commitment to proving himself as a respected artist". Spencer stated that on the album, Benny "navigates the gritty narratives of street life with authenticity and skill" and that "the powerhouse production team brings a rich sonic backdrop, providing the perfect canvas for Benny's intricate and impactful verses". Concluding her review, Spencer states that "Everybody Can't Go becomes a testament to his growth and evolving perspective". Consequence's Marcus Shorter states that on the album, "Benny brings that introspection to the table when discussing the paranoia that breeds a cold heart", and that he "doesn't preach, but he subtly tells those fingers pointing at the bad guy not to throw stones in the glass house that is America". He wrote that "this is Benny the Butcher, uncompromised and unflinching" and that "his old fans wouldn't have it any other way".

== Controversy ==
In the months prior to the release of the album, in August 2023, Benny faced backlash from the media after stating that he is planning to vote for Donald Trump in the 2024 United States presidential election. Following the release of the album, in its title track, "Everybody Can't Go", Benny rapped, "Fuck I'ma do next? They guessin', up wonderin'/Know I'ma win, like the election if Trump run again", again, resulting in the controversy reigniting.

== Track listing ==
Everybody Can't Go track listing
No.	Title	Writer(s)	Producer(s)	Length
1.	"Jermanie's Graduation"	Jeremie Pennick; Alan Maman	The Alchemist	3:37
2.	"Bron"	Jeremie Pennick; Chauncey Hollis Jr.; Francisco Rodriguez	Hit-Boy	2:28
3.	"Big Dog" (with Lil Wayne)	Pennick; Dwayne Carter Jr.; Maman	The Alchemist	4:11
4.	"Everybody Can't Go" (with Kyle Banks)	Pennick; Kyle Banks; Hollis Jr.; Dustin James Corbett	Hit-Boy; Corbett	2:24
5.	"TMVTL"	Pennick; Maman	The Alchemist	4:03
6.	"Back Again" (with Snoop Dogg)	Pennick; Calvin Broadus Jr.; Hollis Jr.	Hit-Boy	3:20
7.	"One Foot In" (with Stove God Cooks)	Pennick; Aaron Cooks; Hollis Jr.	Hit-Boy	2:44
8.	"Buffalo Kitchen Club" (with Armani Caesar)	Pennick; Joclynn Clyburn; Maman	The Alchemist	2:24
9.	"Pillow Talk & Slander" (with Jadakiss and Babyface Ray)	Pennick; Jason Phillips; Marcellus Register; Hollis Jr.	Hit-Boy	3:07
10.	"How to Rap"	Pennick; Hollis Jr.	Hit-Boy	2:42
11.	"Griselda Express" (with Westside Gunn, Conway the Machine and Rick Hyde)	Pennick; Alvin Worthy; Demond Price; Rick Hyde; Maman	The Alchemist	5:45
12.	"Big Tymers" (with Peezy)	Pennick; Phillip Peaks; Hollis Jr.	Hit-Boy	3:32
Total length:				40:17

== Personnel ==
Musicians

- Benny the Butcher – vocals
- Lil Wayne – vocals (3)
- Kyle Banks – vocals (4)
- Snoop Dogg – vocals (6)
- Stove God Cooks – vocals (7)
- Armani Caesar – vocals (8)
- Jadakiss – vocals (9)
- Babyface Ray – vocals (9)
- Westside Gunn – vocals (11)
- Conway the Machine – vocals (11)
- Rick Hyde – vocals (11)
- Peezy – vocals (12)

Technical

- Mike Bozzi – mastering
- Bernie Grundman – mastering
- Jack Doutt – mastering
- Eddie Sancho – mixing (1, 5, 8, 11)
- David Kim – mixing (2, 4, 6, 7, 9, 10, 12), immersive mixing (6)
- Fabian Marasciullo – mixing (3), immersive mixing
- The Alchemist – recording (1, 5, 8, 11)
- Dāvis Strauss – recording (6, 9)
- Dayzel "The Machine" Fowler – recording (9)
- Jun Kim – mixing assistance (2, 4, 6, 7, 9, 10, 12)

Visuals

- Chace Infinite – creative direction
- Cartwright – art direction
- Double Day – art direction
- Joshua Kissi – photography

== Charts ==
Chart performance for Everybody Can't Go
Chart (2024)	Peak position
UK Album Downloads (Official Charts)	46
US Billboard 200	93
US Top R&B/Hip-Hop Albums (Billboard)	37
