= And Then You Pray for Me =

Studio album by Westside Gunn
- Released: October 13, 2023
- Genres: Hip-hop; trap; boom bap
- Length: 75:17
- Labels: Griselda; Empire
- Producers: 1TBeatz; Beat Butcha; Brother Tom Sos; Conductor Williams; Daringer; Deats; Denny LaFlare; DJ Benoit; Dxpe Mikie Beats; FlyGod Jr.; Forever Rollin; JR Swiftz; Johan Lenox; Juko; Mario Luciano; Miguel the Plug; MikeWavvs; Mr. Green; NFE Paris; RyderOnCrack; RZA; Tay Keith

Westside Gunn chronology
10 (2022)	And Then You Pray for Me (2023)	11 (2024)

And Then You Pray for Me is the fifth studio album by American rapper Westside Gunn, released on October 13, 2023, by Griselda Records and Empire. The album is a sequel to Gunn's 2020 album Pray for Paris. With guest appearances from AA Rashid, JID, Conway the Machine, Cartier A Williams, Benny the Butcher, DJ Drama, Stove God Cooks, Rick Ross, Estee Nack, Trap-A-Holics, Giggs, Ty Dolla $ign, Keisha Plum, Denzel Curry, Boldy James, EST Gee, Jeezy, DJ Swamp Izzo, DJ Holiday, Peezy, Rome Streetz, and KayCyy, the album features Gunn's signature boom bap style alongside trap elements. The album debuted at number 29 on the Billboard 200, making it Gunn's highest commercial debut on the chart.

== Background ==
In April 2023, Westside Gunn announced that And Then You Pray for Me was to be released on June 23, 2023, in line with Paris Fashion Week. The album is a sequel to his 2020 album Pray for Paris and its title refers to a lyric in Gunn's song "Eric B", where he raps: "Pray for Paris, then you pray for me." The album's cover was designed by Virgil Abloh using Caravaggio's The Entombment of Christ. Gunn began production of the album in January 2023. For several months, Gunn traveled across multiple countries, including Greece, Germany, United Kingdom, Egypt, and France, and recorded in numerous studios. A song featuring Doe Boy was recorded but was not included in the album after the session files were lost. The album released on October 13, 2023, with Gunn stating that it was his final solo studio album.

== Composition ==
And Then You Pray for Me contains elements of boom bap and trap production. The album's lyrics reference themes of fashion, mysticism, and psychosis. Westside Gunn raps under the alter ego Super Flygod on the album.

The album's opening track, "Flygod Did", features AA Rashid. "Mamas PrimeTime" features Conway the Machine, a tap dancing interlude by Cartier A Williams, and a verse by JID with "slick verbosity". "Kostas", named after a Greek restaurant in Buffalo, was produced by Tay Keith and features Benny the Butcher and Conway the Machine. "Kitchen Lights", produced by DJ Benoit, features minimalistic production with strings, piano, and an unobtrusive bassline. Gunn and Stove God Cooks rap about "poverty, hustling, and material wealth" on the song. "Flygod 2x" features a jazzy instrumental. "DunnHill" is a trap song produced by Miguel the Plug with "skittering hi-hats", a "staid bassline", and a "rudimentary piano melody" and features Rick Ross. "House of Glory", produced by RZA, samples Pyotr Ilyich Tchaikovsky and features Stove God Cooks.

"JD Wrist" is a trap song with "reverb programmed keys". "Disgusting" features British rapper Giggs and samples low ringing church bells over a drum beat. "Ultra GriZelda" was produced by Miguel the Plug and features a rap verse by Denzel Curry. "Jalen Rose" features Boldy James. "Steve and Jony" is a trap song produced by Tay Keith and Deats, and features EST Gee. "Mr Everything" features Gunn and Jeezy trading bars. "The Revenge of Flips Leg" was produced by Conductor Williams and features Rome Streetz. The album's closing track, "And Then You Pray for Me", has elements of R&B production and an introspective rap verse by Gunn.

== Critical reception ==
Professional ratings
Aggregate scores
Source	Rating
Metacritic	74/100
Review scores
Source	Rating
AllMusic	3.5/5 stars
Clash	7/10
HipHopDX	3.8/5
Pitchfork	6.9/10

According to the review aggregator Metacritic, And Then You Pray for Me received "generally favorable reviews" based on a weighted average score of 74 out of 100 from 4 critic scores.

Writing for Pitchfork, Matthew Strauss described the album as a "symbiosis between the trap and boom-bap genres" and a "broad, loud, and messy exploration of Gunn's vision for rap and art." Philip Cluff of Clash praised the album's themes writing: "It's not just another gangster rap album but essentially a commentary on the psychological fatigue accompanying ruthlessness of the question young black men inherited from Gil Scott Heron; "Who will survive in America?" AllMusic's review described the album as "sometimes overly familiar if still satisfying." HipHopDX's Riley Wallace described the album as a "mixed bag that relies on the listener's ability to go with the flow." Damien Scott of Billboard wrote that the album "mixes Griselda's beloved warm soul samples lovingly chopped to support coldhearted coke capers with more of-the-moment trends" and was Gunn's "best solo effort". Marc Antonio Griffin of Vibe wrote that "Gunn's signature catchphrases and eclectic persona work to fit each diverse track into a unified project." Writing for HotNewHipHop, Caroline Fisher wrote that the album "strikes a balance between grandiosity and sincerity, falling back on his signature sound while still incorporating enough new elements for the album to stand out in his discography".

=== Accolades ===
Year-end lists for And Then You Pray for Me
Publication	List	Rank	Ref.
Billboard	The 20 Best Rap Albums of 2023: Staff Picks	15	
BrooklynVegan	25 Best Rap Albums of 2023	18	
HotNewHipHop	25 Best Rap Albums of 2023	20	
Rolling Stone	The 10 Best Rap Albums of 2023	9	
Vibe	The 20 Best Hip-Hop Albums of 2023	13	

== Track listing ==
And Then You Pray for Me track listing
No.	Title	Writer(s)	Producer(s)	Length
1.	"Flygod Did" (featuring AA Rashid)	Alvin Worthy; AA Rashid	Mr. Green	1:56
2.	"Mamas PrimeTime" (featuring JID, Conway the Machine and Cartier A Williams)	Worthy; Destin Choice Route	Beat Butcha; Mr. Green	4:59
3.	"Kostas" (featuring Benny the Butcher and Conway the Machine)	Worthy; Demond Price; Jeremie Damon Pennick	Tay Keith; 1TBeatz	5:33
4.	"1989" (featuring DJ Drama and Stove God Cooks)	Worthy; Aaron Cooks	Miguel the Plug	4:11
5.	"Suicide in Selfridges" (featuring DJ Drama)	Worthy; Napon Pintong	Conductor Williams	2:51
6.	"Kitchen Lights" (featuring Stove God Cooks)	Worthy; Cooks	DJ Benoit	5:00
7.	"Flygod 2x"	Worthy	Dxpe Mikie Beats	1:47
8.	"DunnHill" (featuring Rick Ross)	Worthy; William Leonard Roberts II	Miguel the Plug	3:59
9.	"House of Glory" (featuring Stove God Cooks)	Worthy; Cooks	RZA	3:12
10.	"JD Wrist" (featuring Stove God Cooks, Estee Nack and Trap-A-Holics)	Worthy; Cooks; Estee Nack	FlyGod Jr.	6:19
11.	"Disgusting" (featuring Giggs)	Worthy; Nathaniel Thompson	Miguel the Plug	4:01
12.	"Chloe" (featuring Ty Dolla $ign)	Worthy; Tyrone Griffin Jr.	Denny LaFlare	3:51
13.	"LL Bool Gunn"	Worthy	Miguel the Plug	2:12
14.	"Babylon Bis" (featuring Stove God Cooks and Keisha Plum)	Worthy; Cooks; Keisha Plum	JR Swiftz; Mario Luciano	5:04
15.	"Ultra GriZelda" (featuring Denzel Curry)	Worthy; Denzel Curry	Miguel the Plug	2:28
16.	"Jalen Rose" (featuring Boldy James)	Worthy; James Clay Jones	Daringer	3:15
17.	"Steve and Jony" (featuring EST Gee)	Worthy; George Albert Stone III	Tay Keith; Deats	2:56
18.	"Mr Everything" (featuring Jeezy and DJ Swamp Izzo)	Worthy; Jay Wayne Jenkins	Forever Rollin; NFE Paris; Juko	2:45
19.	"Freddy Js" (featuring DJ Holiday and Peezy)	Worthy; Phillip Glen-Earl Peaks	Miguel the Plug	2:46
20.	"The Revenge of Flips Leg" (featuring Rome Streetz)	Worthy; Pintong; Jerome Allen	Conductor Williams	2:40
21.	"And Then You Pray for Me" (featuring KayCyy)	Worthy; Johan Lenox; Mark Makora Mbogo	Brother Tom Sos; Johan Lenox; MikeWavvs; RyderOnCrack	3:32
Total length:				75:17

Notes

- "House of Glory" samples Swan Lake I. Scene (Swan's Theme) by Pyotr Ilyich Tchaikovsky.

== Charts ==
Chart performance for And Then You Pray for Me
Chart (2023)	Peak position
Australian Albums (ARIA)	81
Canadian Albums (Billboard)	95
US Billboard 200	29
US Independent Albums (Billboard)	6
US Top R&B/Hip-Hop Albums (Billboard)	8
