= Hitler Wears Hermes 7 =

2019 mixtape by Westside Gunn

Mixtape by Westside Gunn
- Released: November 1, 2019
- Genre: Hip-hop
- Length: 43:20
- Label: Griselda

Westside Gunn chronology
Flygod Is an Awesome God (2019)	Hitler Wears Hermes 7 (2019)	Flyest Nig@@ in Charge, Vol. 1 (2020)

Hitler Wears Hermes 7 is the eighth mixtape by American rapper Westside Gunn. Released on November 1, 2019, through Griselda Records, it contains features from Benny the Butcher, Boldy James, Conway the Machine, Currensy, DJ Drama, Estee Nack, Fat Joe, Jay Worthy and Keisha Plum. The album is produced by the Alchemist, Animoss, August Fanon, Cee Gee, Daringer, Denny Laflare, Diamante, DJ Green Lantern, JR Swiftz, King JVY B, M-A, SadhuGold and Statik Selektah.

== Release and reception ==
Hitler Wears Hermes 7 is the seventh installment of the Hitler Wears Hermes mixtape series. Released November 1, 2019, it received somewhat positive reviews from critics. Reed Jackson of Pitchfork rated the album a 7.3, saying "On Hitler Wears Hermes 7, the formula doesn't change, with Gunn rapping ruthlessly about life on the streets of Buffalo over glistening barely touched samples".

== Track listing ==
All tracks are written by Westside Gunn.

No.	Title	Music	Length
1.	"FCKNXTWK" (featuring DJ Drama)	King JVY B	2:26
2.	"Broadway Joes"	Cee Gee	3:22
3.	"Size 42"	Daringer	2:10
4.	"Connie's Son"	King JVY B	1:54
5.	"Banana Yacht" (featuring Estee Nack)	Diamante, Denny Laflare	4:33
6.	"Gondek"	August Fanon	1:01
7.	"Kelly's Korner" (featuring Fat Joe)	Statik Selektah	3:42
8.	"Undertaker Vs. Goldberg" (featuring Conway the Machine)	DJ Green Lantern	4:34
9.	"Whoopy"	King JVY B	1:13
10.	"Love U"	Animoss	1:02
11.	"Kool G" (featuring Benny the Butcher and Conway the Machine)	Daringer and the Alchemist	2:30
12.	"It's Possible" (featuring Boldy James and Jay Worthy)	SadhuGold	3:51
13.	"Lucha Bros" (featuring Currensy and Benny the Butcher)	the Alchemist	4:22
14.	"WestSideGunn Day"	JR Swiftz	2:14
15.	"Kensington Pool"	M-A	3:08
16.	"Outro" (featuring Keisha Plum)	the Alchemist	1:25
Total length:			43:20

== Charts ==
Chart performance for 10
Chart (2019)	Peak position
US Independent Albums (Billboard)	47
