= Isaac Pelayo =

American painter (born 1996)

Isaac Pelayo (born June 7, 1996) is an American painter. He is best known for his works with rapper Westside Gunn.

== Career ==
Pelayo was born on June 7, 1996, in Los Angeles. He stated in an interview with Business Insider that he drew throughout his childhood and was encouraged by his father Antonio, who is also an artist. He attended the University of Nevada, Las Vegas; he dropped out in his second year and returned to Los Angeles. He then taught himself painting in 2016, and got hired as an inker for The Walt Disney Company, where his father also worked. They were fired during the COVID-19 pandemic.

In 2017, Pelayo was discovered by rapper Westside Gunn through his Instagram. He looked to buy a painting, but instead began collaborating. He has painted album covers for Gunn and Armani Caesar. As of 2022, Gunn owns between 20 and 30 paintings by Pelayo. His works are owned by others, including street artist Shepard Fairey and football player D. J. Reader. In 2021, he sold 50 paintings for more than $250,000. In 2019, he installed a piece of wall across the street from the Gagosian Gallery, which featured his altered painting of Mona Lisa and the text 'walls are for art! Not dividing people' spraypainted above. It protested the Mexico–United States border wall. In December 2023, he painted a portrait of Norman Rockwell for The Red Lion Inn. On April 5, 2025, the Artemizia Gallery of Bisbee, Arizona presented multiple paintings by Pelayo.

Pelayo is also a tattoo artist.

== Artistry ==
Pelayo paints primarily on wood or with spray paint. His influences include Leonardo da Vinci, Caravaggio, Rembrandt, Diego Velázquez, Retna, Shepard Fairey, and El Mac.

== Exhibitions ==
- Vision (2018)
- Vivian At The Art Basel (2021)
- Bochella (2022)
- The New Renaissance (2022)
- WWVD (2023)
