= Flygod (album) =

Studio album by Westside Gunn
- Released: March 11, 2016
- Recorded: 2016
- Genres: Hip-hop; boom bap
- Length: 57:54
- Labels: Griselda; EMPIRE
- Producers: Daringer; Statik Selektah; Roc Marciano; Apollo Brown; Camouflage Monk; The Alchemist; Tha God Fahim

Westside Gunn chronology
Hitler Wears Hermes 3 (2015)	Flygod (2016)	There's God and There's Flygod, Praise Both (2016)

Flygod (stylized in all caps) is the debut studio album by American rapper Westside Gunn. It was released on March 11, 2016, by Griselda Records and distributed through EMPIRE. The album features production from Daringer, Statik Selektah, Roc Marciano, Apollo Brown, Camouflage Monk, The Alchemist and Tha God Fahim. The album includes guest appearances from Conway the Machine, Keisha Plum, Benny The Butcher, Your Old Droog, Meyhem Lauren, Danny Brown, DJ Q-Bert, Mach-Hommy, Roc Marciano, Skyzoo, Billie Essco, Action Bronson, and AA Rashid. The album was re-released on all digital streaming platforms on December 25, 2020.

== Reception ==
Flygod was placed at #176 on Rolling Stone's 200 Greatest Hip-Hop Albums of All Time list on June 7, 2022.

== Track listing ==
No.	Title	Producer(s)	Length
1.	"Dunks" (featuring Conway the Machine)	Daringer	4:05
2.	"Gustavo" (featuring Keisha Plum)	Daringer	4:41
3.	"Shower Shoe Lords" (featuring Benny the Butcher)	Daringer	4:29
4.	"Vivian at The Art Basel" (featuring Your Old Droog)	Camoflauge Monk	4:40
5.	"Hall"	Roc Marciano	1:44
6.	"Free Chapo" (featuring Conway the Machine)	Daringer	2:38
7.	"Over Gold" (featuring Meyhem Lauren)	Daringer	2:43
8.	"Bodies On Fairfax" (featuring Danny Brown)	Daringer	3:17
9.	"Chine Gun"	Daringer	2:35
10.	"King City" (featuring DJ Q-Bert & Mach-Hommy)	Tha God Fahim	3:35
11.	"Omar's Coming" (featuring Conway the Machine and Roc Marciano)	Daringer	2:37
12.	"Mr. T"	Apollo Brown	3:25
13.	"50 Inch Zenith" (featuring Skyzoo)	Statik Selektah	2:57
14.	"Sly Green Skit"		1:04
15.	"55 & A Half"	Daringer	3:32
16.	"Albright Knox" (featuring Chase)	Daringer	3:29
17.	"Dudley Boyz" (featuring Action Bronson)	The Alchemist	2:01
18.	"Outro" (featuring AA Rashid)	Camoflauge Monk	4:22
Total length:			57:54
