= DJ Shay =

American record producer (c.1972–2020)

- Born: c. 1972
- Origin: Buffalo, New York, US
- Died: August 2020 (aged 48)
- Genres: Hip hop
- Occupation: Record producer
- Labels: Buff City

Demetrius Chawton Robinson (c. 1972 – August 2020), known professionally as DJ Shay, was an American disc jockey and record producer who often collaborated with Griselda Records artists.

== Biography ==
Robinson was born c. 1972. At age 10, began DJing for local events in Buffalo, New York, after receiving a turntable for Christmas.

Robinson began producing for a group called Brotherhood Nation. He first worked with Benny the Butcher and Conway the Machine in the 2000s. He was a co-producer on Benny the Butcher's 2019 EP The Plugs I Met.

Robinson helped Armani Caesar create her first song while working in his recording studio.

=== Death and legacy ===
Robinson died in August 2020, from COVID-19, aged 48. His funeral service was held on August 27. After the funeral concluded, Conway the Machine—an attendee—was handcuffed, but not arrested.

On September 9, 2022, the Black Soprano Family released the mixtape Long Live DJ Shay in tribute.

== Discography ==
- Stop Calling Art Content (2021)
- Unsigned City (2006)
