= Supreme Blientele =

Studio album by Westside Gunn
- Released: June 22, 2018
- Recorded: 2017–2018
- Genre: Hip-hop
- Length: 51:03
- Labels: Griselda; EMPIRE
- Producers: Daringer; The Alchemist; Pete Rock; Harry Fraud; Sadhugold; Roc Marciano; Statik Selektah; 9th Wonder; Nephew Hesh

Westside Gunn chronology
Flygod Is Good... All the Time (2018)	Supreme Blientele (2018)	Hitler Wears Hermes 6 (2018)

Professional ratings
Aggregate scores
Source	Rating
Metacritic	69/100
Review scores
Source	Rating
Exclaim!	9/10
Pitchfork	7.1/10
Rolling Stone	3/5 stars

Supreme Blientele (alternatively titled Chris Benoit and God Is the Greatest) is the second studio album by American rapper Westside Gunn. It was released on June 22, 2018, through Griselda Records with distribution by Empire Distribution. Production was handled by Daringer, The Alchemist, Pete Rock, Harry Fraud, Sadhugold, Roc Marciano, Statik Selektah, 9th Wonder and Nephew Hesh. The album includes guest appearances from AA Rashid, Anderson .Paak, Benny the Butcher, Busta Rhymes, Conway the Machine, Crimeapple, Elzhi, Keisha Plum, Jadakiss and Roc Marciano.

== Background ==
Supreme Blientele is an allusion to Ghostface Killah's album Supreme Clientele and the Canadian professional wrestler Chris Benoit.

== Reception ==
Supreme Blientele received positive reviews from critics. Riley Wallace of Exclaim! rated it a 9/10, saying "Westside Gunn's storytelling game is on point, and with his unique cadence, he provides yet another piece of hip-hop artwork". Mike Madden of Pitchfork rated it a 7.1/10, saying "Gunn fades too much into the background of his own album, but the collaborations also result in some of the best songs here [...] this crowdedness prevents Supreme Blientele from feeling like a definitive statement from Gunn as a rapper, the album can still function". Mosi Reeves of Rolling Stone rated the album 3/5 stars, saying "Gunn himself has a sharp, high-pitched voice and breaks verses down into micro-fragments; he’s not as lyrically deft as some of his thug rap peers, but he's punchy and effective".

== Track listing ==
No.	Title	Producer(s)	Length
1.	"Big Homie Arn"		1:00
2.	"Gods Don't Bleed" (featuring Benny the Butcher and Jadakiss)	Daringer	4:57
3.	"Dean Malenko"	Daringer	2:47
4.	"Brutus" (featuring Benny the Butcher and Conway the Machine)	Pete Rock	4:29
5.	"Amherst Station"	Daringer	1:31
6.	"RVD" (featuring Keisha Plum)	Daringer	3:30
7.	"Elizabeth"	The Alchemist	4:08
8.	"Mean Gene"	The Alchemist	1:31
9.	"Stefflon Don"	Sadhu Gold; Nephew Hesh	1:54
10.	"Sabu"	Sadhu Gold	1:12
11.	"Brossface Brippler" (featuring Benny the Butcher and Busta Rhymes)	The Alchemist	4:02
12.	"Spanish Jesus" (featuring Crimeapple)	Harry Fraud	2:46
13.	"The Steiners" (featuring Elzhi)	Pete Rock	2:45
14.	"Ric Martel" (featuring Roc Marciano)	Roc Marciano	2:14
15.	"Westside"	Statik Selektah	3:16
16.	"Wrestlemania 20" (featuring Anderson .Paak)	9th Wonder	6:25
17.	"AA Outro" (featuring AA Rashid)	Harry Fraud	2:46
Total length:			51:03

== Chart history ==
Chart (2018)	Peak position
US Independent Albums (Billboard)	26
US Heatseekers Albums (Billboard)	7
