= Big Ghost =

Blogger and hip hop producer

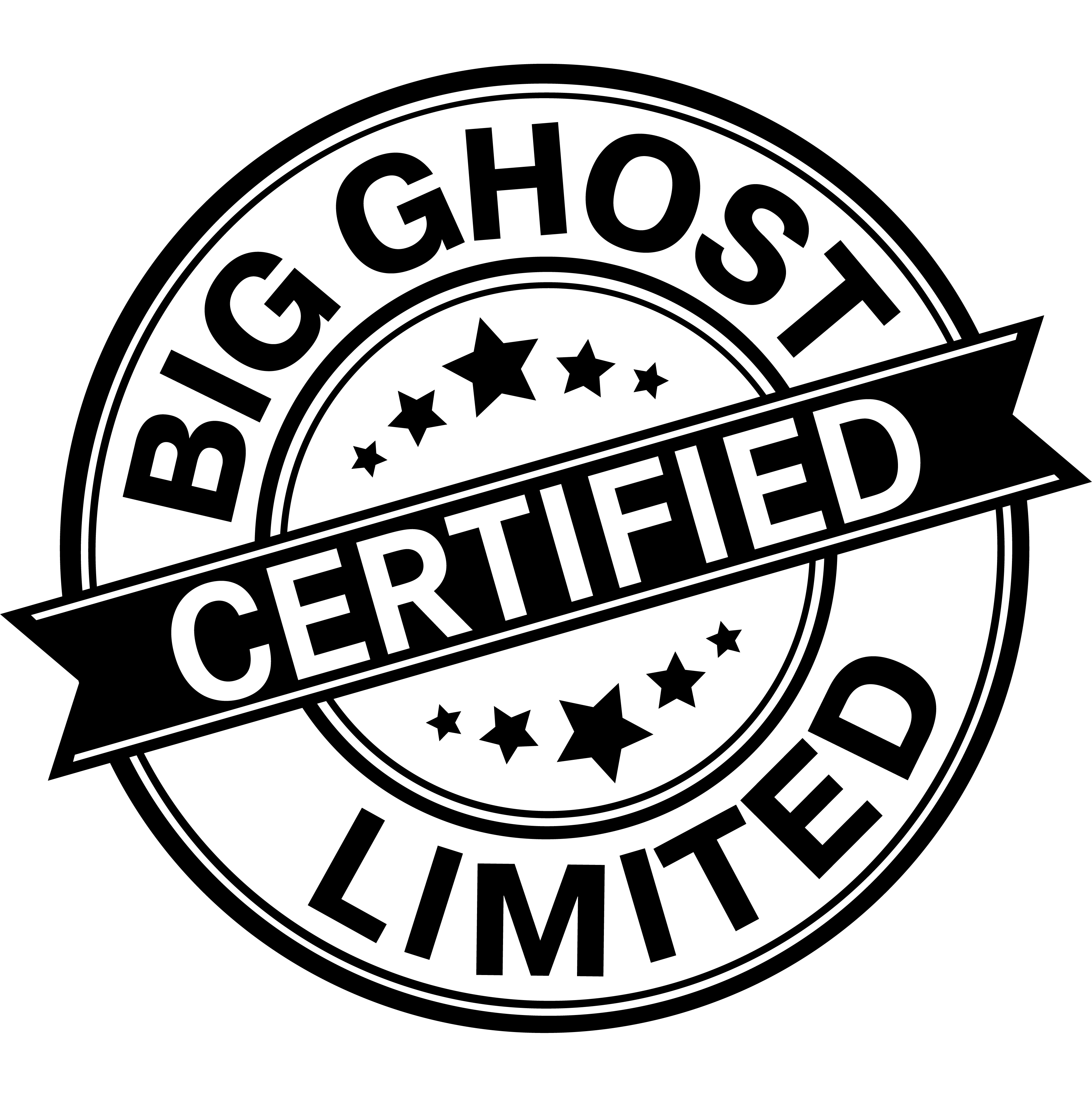
Big Ghost Ltd logo

Big Ghost is an anonymous online personality, hip hop writer and blogger, and music producer. He was once best known for his witty writing style and satirical humor on his earlier hip hop album reviews and blog posts.

== History ==
Big Ghost began as a parody of Wu Tang Clan's Ghostface Killah, which many believed to be Ghostface himself.

He was interviewed by various online magazines including GQ, Genius, and Complex and later began writing for and collaborating with major blogs and websites such as Okayplayer and the Genius website.

== Controversy ==
In early March 2011, rapper Wiz Khalifa publicly went on the air during an interview on The Star & Bucwild Morning Show, and made remarks about rapper Ghostface Killah, saying that he was "corny", for allegedly commenting on Wiz's latest single "Roll Up" on his blog, further stating, "Him saying corny stuff makes him a corny individual".

The real Ghostface quickly responded stating it was not him, tweeting "tell the kid Wiz, its all love i respect him as a artist and got no issues wit him at all, Once again the website is fake, its not ya boy!", then later tweeting again, reaffirming that he had no affiliation with the blogger.

On 3 March 2011, legal action was taken by Wu Tang Corporate to shut the blog site down due to infringement violations but was later made operational once again.

== Music production ==
In late 2015, Big Ghost branched out into music production, releasing a free project with production being credited solely to Big Ghost Ltd. It has never been made publicly clear whether Big Ghost Ltd itself is a solo venture or a team of collaborating producers, although a Hector Puente Colon Jr. & The Santiago Men's Basketball Philharmonic Orchestra has been attributed to the instrumentation on all albums. The first release under the Big Ghost Ltd name, was a collaborative project with Buffalo rappers Westside Gunn and Conway the Machine, entitled Griselda Ghost, released on 11 September 2015. On 5 October 2018, Big Ghost Ltd. was given full production credit on Ghostface Killah's 2018 project called The Lost Tapes.

== Discography ==
=== Albums / EPs ===
Album	Artist	Release date	Year
Griselda Ghost	Westside Gunn & Conway	11 September	2015
The Ghost of Living	Vic Spencer	23 September	2016
Cocaine Beach	Hus Kingpin	1 June	2017
Aguardiente	Crimeapple	4 March	2018
Van Ghost	Ankhlejohn	8 June	2018
The Lost Tapes	Ghostface Killah	5 October	2018
Chicaghost	D.Brash	8 March	2019
A Bullet For Every Heathen	38 Spesh	20 July	2019
The Only Way Out	Rigz & Mooch	24 December	2019
Carpe Noctem	Big Ghost Ltd	10 January	2020
No One Mourns The Wicked	Conway The Machine	15 May	2020
The Dark Side of Nature	M.A.V. & Rob Gates	18 July	2020
All Praise Is Due	K.A.A.N.	29 July	2020
The Ghost of Albizu	UFO Fev	31 October	2020
If It Bleeds It Can Be Killed	Conway The Machine	5 February	2021
Heavy Is the Head	Ransom	23 July	2021
A Tree Grows in Brooklyn	Eddie Kaine	15 October	2021
Two Nights In Marrakesh	Al.Divino	3 December	2021
Authenticity Check	Jae Skeese	19 April	2022
What Has Been Blessed Cannot Be Cursed	Conway The Machine	17 June	2022
Wolves Don't Eat With Shepherds	Knowledge The Pirate	19 July	2022
Pay the Ghost	Milano Constantine	20 September	2022
Gucci Ghost	Mickey Diamond	9 December	2022
Gucci Ghost 2	Mickey Diamond	23 December	2022
Wasn't Built In A Day	Rome Streetz	27 February	2023
Noir Or Never	Che Noir	3 March	2023
Gucci Ghost 3	Mickey Diamond	15 December	2023
Gucci Ghost 4	Mickey Diamond	22 December	2023
Last Exit To Crooklyn	Eddie Kaine	2 April	2024
Bazuko	Crimeapple	31 May	2024
Gucci Gambinos	Mickey Diamond	29 November	2024
Wolf Tickets	Mickey Diamond	16 December	2025
Black Sheep	Mickey Diamond	3 February	2026
Blood Of The Lamb	Mickey Diamond	12 June	2026
B.I.L.L.Y.	Mickey Diamond	02 October	2026
B.I.L.L.Y. 2	Mickey Diamond	02 October	2026

=== Singles ===
Vega Bros. feat. Guilty Simpson & Conway The Machine
- Released: 3 October 2016
CC White (co-production) - Wale
- Released: April 28, 2017
Original Man feat. Ankhlejohn & Hus Kingpin
- Released: 18 August 2017
The Jungle - Recognize Ali
- Released: 26 August 2018
Worm Food - Recognize Ali
- Released: 16 August 2019
Barracudas featuring Knowledge the Pirate, Lord Juco & Guilty Simpson
- Released: 02 October 2020
Los Traficantes feat. Cousin Feo & Lord Juco
- Released: 04 December 2020
Bodies In The Hudson feat. Cousin Feo & Lord Juco
- Released: 04 December 2020
Brands Of High Quality feat. Ty Farris
- Released: 12 November 2021
Mickey Diamond - Time Wasted
- Released: 28 July 2022
The Thoughts Of Ghost feat. Ty Farris
- Released: 17 February 2023
Basque In Glory feat. Cousin Feo & Lord Juco
- Released: 30 April 2025
Gold Griot feat. Sadat X & Ill Al Skratch
- Released: 25 June 2026

=== Remixes ===
Hus Kingpin - Serotonin High (Redux) feat. Milano Constantine x DJ Q-Bert
- Released: 2 October 2017
Vic Spencer - SauceMANIA feat. Chris Crack
- Released: 15 January 2018
Vic Spencer - Siracha Slurpee feat. Ankhlejohn
- Released: 4 March 2019
Vic Spencer - Choose It to Lose It feat. Rome Streetz
- Released: 18 January 2021
Jay Royale - The Transaction feat. Conway The Machine
- Released: 26 February 2021
Vic Spencer - Breakfast In Pill Hill feat. Stove God Cooks
- Released: 04 May 2022
The Iron - Jay Royale feat. Benny The Butcher
- Released: 24 September 2022
Recognize & Realize Part 3 feat. Big Noyd & Prodigy (rapper)
- Released: 07 December 2023

=== Remix albums ===
Jay-Z - The Black Album Revisited
- Released: 13 November 2018
Trust the Sopranos - Big Ghost Ltd.‘83 Miami Edition
- Released: 3 September 2021
The Ghronic - Speshal Machinery (Big Ghost Ltd Edition)
- Released: 22 September 2023

=== Instrumental albums ===
Starkstrumentals
- Released: 19 December 2018
An Open Tomb... An Empty Casket
- Released: 20 June 2020
Griselda Ghostrumentals Vol.1
- Released: 07 Feb 2025

=== Compilation albums ===
Ghost Anthology 1.1: All Power-Ups
- Released: 18 January 2022
Ghost Anthology 1.2: High Score Jux
- Released: 18 January 2022
Ghost Anthology 2.1: Infinite Ammo Hitters
- Released: 30 March 2025
Ghost Anthology 2.2: Noclip Mode
- Released: 30 March 2025

=== Mixtapes ===
The Unofficial Official Tape - Soles of Mischief
- Released: 4 December 2020
The Unofficial Official Tape - Ghosts Don't Die
- Released: 28 Feb 2025
