= Pray for Paris =

Studio album by Westside Gunn
- Released: April 17, 2020
- Recorded: 2020
- Genre: Hip-hop
- Length: 41:19
- Labels: Griselda; EMPIRE
- Producers: The Alchemist; Beat Butcha; Bohemia Lynch; Camoflauge Monk; Conductor Williams; Daringer; DJ Muggs; DJ Premier; Jay Versace; Tyler, the Creator

Westside Gunn chronology
Flyest Nig@@ in Charge, Vol. 1 (2020)	Pray for Paris (2020)	Flygod Is an Awesome God 2 (2020)

Pray for Paris is the third studio album by American rapper Westside Gunn. It was released on April 17, 2020 through Griselda Records with distribution by Empire Distribution. The album was produced by Daringer, Beat Butcha, the Alchemist, DJ Muggs, and DJ Premier. It features guest appearances from Benny the Butcher, Conway the Machine, Joey Bada$$, Tyler, the Creator, Boldy James, Freddie Gibbs, Roc Marciano, Wale, Joyce Wrice, Billie Essco, Keisha Plum, and Cartier Williams. The album debuted at number 67 on the Billboard 200.

== Background and development ==
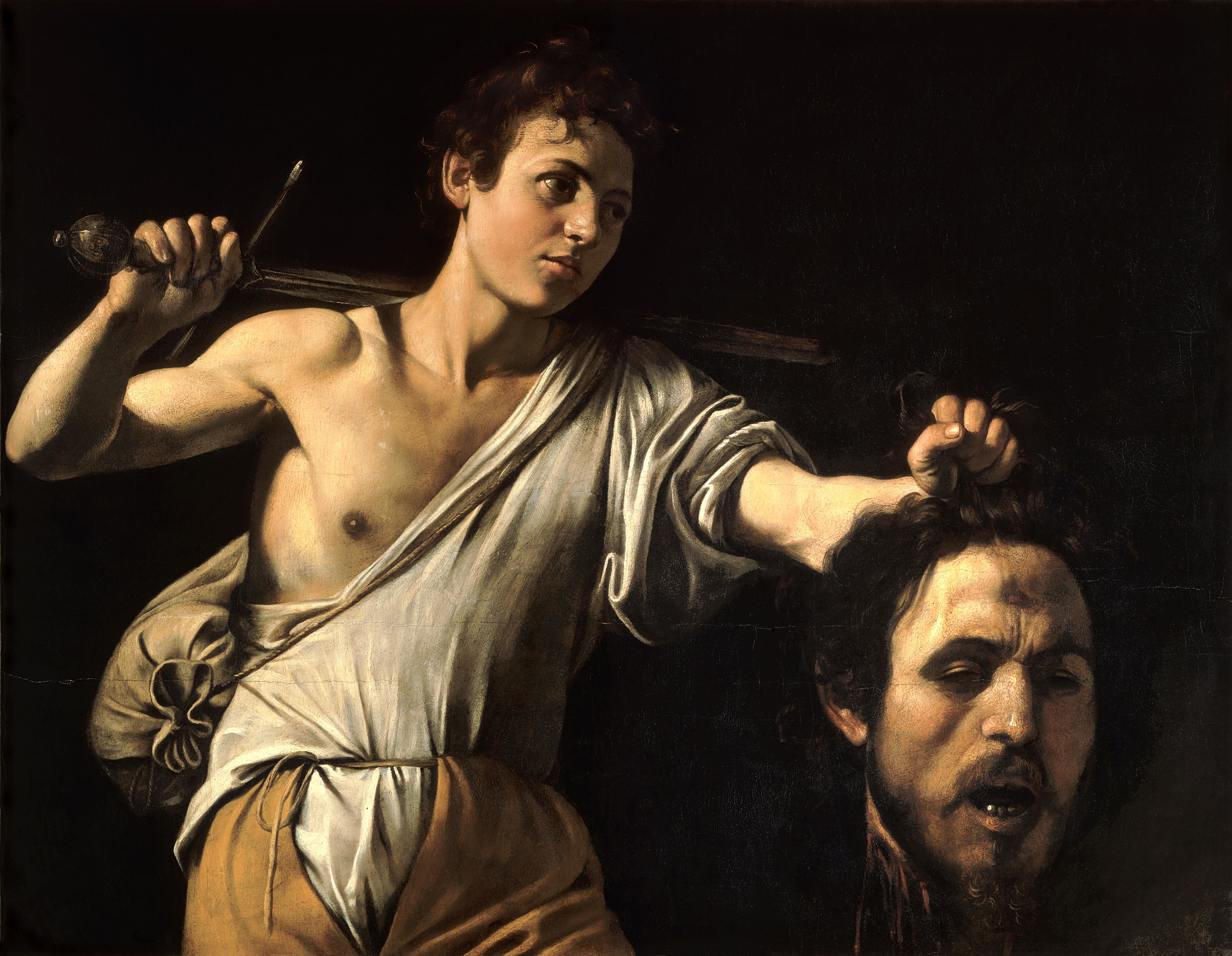
The album cover of Pray for Paris is an altered version of Caravaggio's David with the Head of Goliath

Westside Gunn announced he was recording a project called Pray for Paris after having attended Virgil Abloh's Off-White Paris fashion show on January 18, 2020. He revealed the album's artwork on April 3, 2020. The cover was created by Virgil Abloh using Caravaggio's David with the Head of Goliath. During the album's recording Westside learned he had contracted COVID-19 and recounted having to do promotion for the album while suffering symptoms from the virus. "A few days before dropping the album, Westside revealed that he contracted COVID-19 but has since recovered. "I have a confession to Make I’m a Corona Survivor," Westside wrote on IG. "I didn’t want anybody feeling sorry for me I had to thug it out for weeks I didn’t get to see my kids I went to the hospital feeling like I was breathing my last breath the fans and the love I was getting kept me strong." Before the album's release, Westside Gunn and Virgil Abloh live-streamed the entire project on Twitch.

== Critical reception ==
Professional ratings
Review scores
Source	Rating
And It Don't Stop	A−
Earmilk	8.5/10 stars
Exclaim!	8/10
HipHopDX	4.2/5
Pitchfork	8/10
The Young Folks	7/10
Tom Hull	B+

Gregory Castel of Earmilk stated "Pray for Paris is a soulful yet, grimey masterpiece. This album is a handpicked selection of high-level artists, in lyricism, soulful production, and visual artwork". Riley Wallace of HipHopDX said, "Pray For Paris seems to show Gunn resisting being boxed-in artistically. For some critics who may have found past offerings more of an acquired taste, this is the camp’s most inviting project to date". Alphonse Pierre of Pitchfork stated "The Buffalo rapper continues his unlikely ascent into hip-hop stardom with an album of feverish excess and the best raps of his career". In his "Consumer Guide" column, Robert Christgau said that "this album enjoys old-fashioned hip-hop materialism with dauntless esprit". Exclaim! reviewer A. Harmony said "Though Gunn's vintage sound might not work for everyone, Pray for Paris is a total delight for those who want to reminisce without feeling stuck in the past".

In another positive review, Dylan Green of DJ Booth stated "In the age of streaming and playlists, Pray For Paris further solidifies Westside Gunn as an album artist. He knows how to craft experiences from start to finish, what beats sound best next to each other, which features will yield the wildest results". Ryan Middleton of Magnetic Magazine said, "Despite this album having the sheen of opulence and examining fuck you money at the outset, it remains grounded with an ear to the streets."

=== Accolades ===
Accolades for Pray for Paris
Publication	Accolade	Rank
Complex	Top 50 Albums of 2020 – Mid-Year	5
Complex	Top 50 Albums of 2020	9
Consequence of Sound	Top 50 Albums of 2020	41
Crack Magazine	Top 50 Albums of 2020	41
Exclaim!	Top 33 Albums of 2020 – Mid-Year	26
Uproxx	Top 50 Albums of 2020 – Mid-Year	29
Uproxx	Top 50 Albums of 2020	40

== Track listing ==
No.	Title	Producer(s)	Length
1.	"400 Million Plus Tax"		1:09
2.	"No Vacancy"	DJ Muggs	1:35
3.	"George Bondo" (featuring Conway the Machine and Benny The Butcher)	Beat Butcha; Daringer	4:44
4.	"327" (featuring Joey Bada$$, Tyler, the Creator and Billie Essco)	Camoflauge Monk; 7ies	5:49
5.	"French Toast" (featuring Wale and Joyce Wrice)	Camoflauge Monk	4:48
6.	"Euro Step"	Conductor Williams	1:50
7.	"Allah Sent Me" (featuring Conway the Machine and Benny The Butcher)	Daringer	4:50
8.	"$500 Ounces" (featuring Freddie Gibbs and Roc Marciano)	The Alchemist	4:13
9.	"Versace"	Jay Versace	2:05
10.	"Claiborne Kick" (featuring Boldy James)	The Alchemist	3:17
11.	"Shawn Vs. Flair"	DJ Premier	2:22
12.	"Party Wit Pop Smoke" (featuring Keisha Plum)	Tyler, the Creator	2:14
13.	"Le Djoliba" (featuring Cartier Williams)	Bohemia Lynch	2:23
Total length:			41:19

== Charts ==
Chart (2020)	Peak position
US Billboard 200	67
