= 38 Spesh =

American rapper and record producer (born 1984)

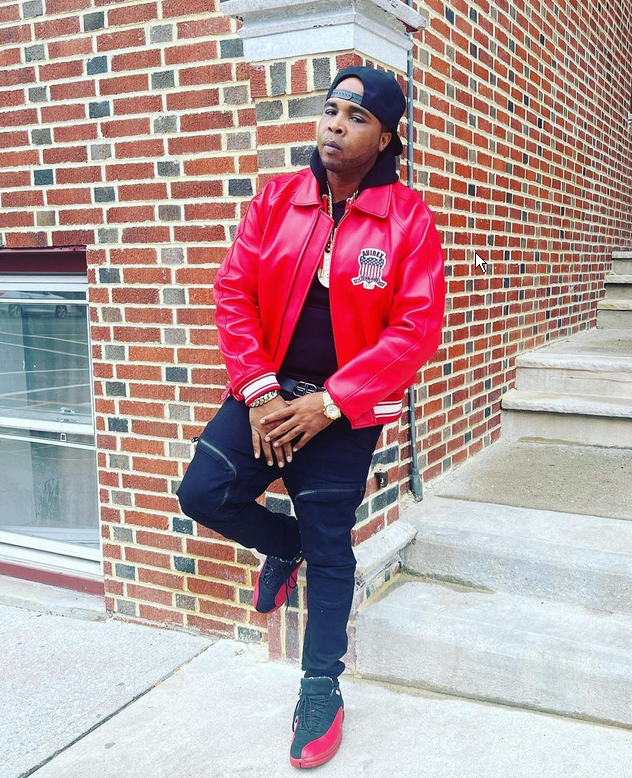
- Harrell in 2022

Background information
- Also known as: .38 Special, Spe$h
- Born: Justin Harrell; December 29, 1984 (age 41); Rochester, New York, US
- Genres: Hip hop
- Occupation: Rapper
- Years active: 2002–present
- Website: http://38spesh.bandcamp.com/

Justin Harrell (born December 29, 1984), better known by his stage name 38 Spesh, is an American rapper and producer.

== Biography ==
=== Early life and career beginnings ===
38 Spesh was born on December 29, 1984, in Rochester, New York, and began rapping in the early 2000s. He got his stage name from the .38 Special. He began making appearances on the SiriusXM show Invasion Radio, hosted by fellow Rochester native DJ Green Lantern in 2008, and was featured in XXL in 2009.

Shortly after his initial breakthrough, 38 Spesh spent two years incarcerated and was paroled to Atlanta, Georgia, where he began to pursue a full-time career in music.

Following his release, Spesh began releasing several notable mixtapes and albums with other artists affiliated with his Trust Comes First Music group. Spesh's musical style is highlighted by one of the most unique rapping voices in the game and his strong punchlines. Notable rappers who have worked with 38 Spesh include: Styles P, Jadakiss, Fred the Godson, AZ, Noreaga, DJ Green Lantern, Benny the Butcher, Conway the Machine, and Kool G Rap. He has worked with several high-profile hip hop record producers among the likes of DJ Premier, Pete Rock and The Alchemist.

== Discography ==
Solo projects

- 2007: Out on Bail
- 2009: In Custody
- 2012: Time Served
- 2014: The Art of Production
- 2015: The Trust Tape
- 2015: The Trust Tape 2
- 2016: The 38 Laws of Powder
- 2019: 5 Shots
- 2019: The 38 Strategies of Raw
- 2019: The Trust Tape 3
- 2019: A Bullet For Every Heathen
- 2019: 1994
- 2020: Speshal Blends
- 2020: 6 Shots
- 2020: 1995
- 2020: Interstate 38
- 2022: Beyond Belief
- 2023: Gunsmoke
- 2024: Mother & Gun
- 2026: 8 Shots

Collaboration projects

- 2015: Cocaine Cowboys (with Benny the Butcher)
- 2018: Stabbed & Shot (with Benny the Butcher)
- 2018: In the Mob We Trust (with Joe Blow)
- 2018: Son of G Rap (with Kool G Rap)
- 2019: Loyalty and Trust (with Flee Lord)
- 2019: Army of Trust (with Trust Army)
- 2020: Juno (with Che Noir)
- 2020: Martyr's Prayer (with Elcamino)
- 2020: Trust the Chain (with Planet Asia)
- 2020: 1000 Words (with 1000 Words)
- 2020: Army of Trust II (with Trust Army)
- 2020: Ways and Means (with Rasheed Chappell)
- 2020: Loyalty and Trust 2 (with Flee Lord)
- 2021: Trust the Sopranos (with Benny the Butcher)
- 2023: Speshal Machinery (with Conway the Machine)
- 2024: Stabbed & Shot 2 (with Benny the Butcher)
- 2024: God's Timing (with Grafh)
