= Westside Gunn =

American rapper (born 1982)

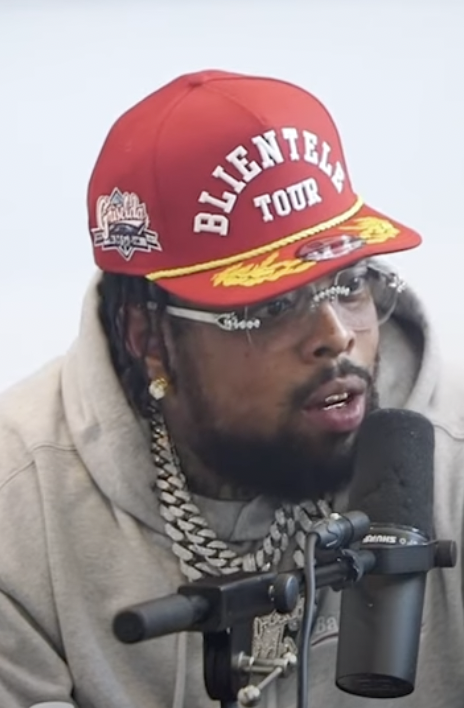
- Worthy in 2021

Background information
- Also known as: Flygod; Super Flygod; Hall; W.S.G.; Gunn; Flygod 2x
- Born: Alvin Lamar Worthy; July 27, 1982 (age 44); Buffalo, New York, U.S.
- Genres: East Coast hip-hop; underground hip-hop; hardcore hip-hop; mafioso rap; drumless rap
- Occupations: Rapper; songwriter; record producer; fashion designer
- Years active: 2005–present
- Labels: Daupe!; Griselda; Roc Nation; Shady

Alvin Lamar Worthy (born July 27, 1982), known professionally as Westside Gunn, is an American rapper, fashion designer and professional wrestling promoter. He co-founded the hip-hop record label Griselda Records in 2012 with his half-brother Conway the Machine and their cousin Benny the Butcher.

Since 2005, he has released five studio albums, in addition to a wide catalog of mixtapes and extended plays. Gunn was affiliated with Shady Records from 2017 to 2020, but has since returned to independent work.

== Early life ==
Gunn was born on July 27, 1982, in Buffalo, New York and grew up in the impoverished East Side neighborhood. His paternal half-brother is Conway the Machine and his younger cousin is Benny the Butcher; both would go on to join him in hip-hop. He moved frequently during his childhood, including to the richer west end of Buffalo. He showed interest in fashion as a child and, according to his marketer, Derrick Jackson, wore gold chains in elementary school. He also created comic books with his friends while in elementary school.

== Music career ==
=== 2005–2016: early career and founding Griselda Records ===
Gunn's first project was a mixtape called Flyest Nig@@ In Charge in 2005, however it was unreleased; a version was eventually released via music streaming services in 2020. (The 2020 streaming version’s image of the mixtape’s cover features an oil painting of its original 2005 cover.) Gunn did not release his own music until 2012, instead devoting his time to managing his half-brother, rapper Conway the Machine. In 2012, after Conway was seriously injured in a shooting, Gunn began releasing music; his debut was the extended play (EP) Hitler Wears Hermes, the name is a play on The Devil Wears Prada. It eventually was the first mixtape of a series and generated controversy over the reference in the name to Adolf Hitler.

In 2014, Gunn co-founded the Griselda Records record label with Conway the Machine and Mach-Hommy. In 2015, Gunn and Conway formed the superduo Hall & Nash, releasing the EP Griselda Ghost, produced by Big Ghost, on September 11 that year. Gunn’s next release was his official debut studio album Flygod, released on March 11, 2016. Also in 2016, Gunn and Conway recorded Hall & Nash 2 and scheduled a 2017 release date, however this did not occur due to their signing with Shady Records. (It was eventually released via streaming services on December 29, 2023, following a surprise announcement from Hall & Nash II's producer The Alchemist on December 25.)

=== 2017–2020: continued growth and record label tenure ===
On February 10, 2017, Gunn and Mil Beats released the collaborative EP Riots on Fashion Avenue, consisting of four songs.

On March 3, 2017, Griselda Records signed a deal with Eminem's label Shady Records, making Westside Gunn and Conway the first rappers from Buffalo to sign with a major label. A few days later on March 9, Gunn made "Hitler on Steroids" with DJ Green Lantern. After signing with Shady, Gunn played at Coachella, Firefly and the Governors Ball. On October 2, 2020, Westside Gunn released his Shady Records debut, Who Made the Sunshine, his only solo project with the label.

Shortly after signing with Shady Records, Gunn released Flygod Is Good... All the Time, as a collaborative EP with producer Mr. Green. In 2018, Gunn released Supreme Blientele. He also signed with Roc Nation alongside label mate Benny the Butcher on August 6, 2019, under a management deal.

On April 17, 2020, Gunn released his third studio album, Pray for Paris. The album features Wale, Joey Badass, Freddie Gibbs and Tyler, the Creator, among others. On July 3 that year, Westside Gunn released his tenth mixtape, Flygod Is an Awesome God II, the sequel to his July 2019 mixtape Flygod Is an Awesome God. The album features guest appearances from frequent collaborators Benny The Butcher, Keisha Plum, Boldy James, and Daringer.

On November 14, 2020, in an interview with Joe Budden, Gunn announced he had fulfilled his contractual obligations to Shady Records and had become an independent artist.

=== 2021–present: Independent career ===
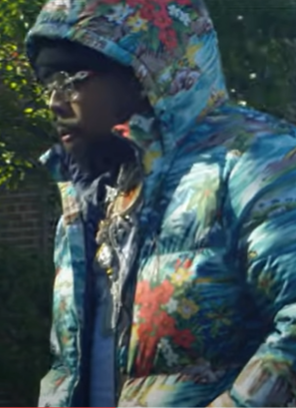
Westside Gunn in Conflicted (2021)

In 2021, Gunn starred in the film Conflicted, alongside Benny the Butcher, Michael Rapaport, and J. Holiday. Also in 2021, he released two songs, titled "TV Boy" and "Julia Lang"; the latter was named after fashion entrepreneur Julia Lang. Both songs would eventually be included in his mixtape Hitler Wears Hermes 8: Side B, released later that year. This mixtape was preceded by Hitler Wears Hermes 8: Sincerely Adolf, which was released the same year. In 2022, Westside Gunn stated on Twitter that he would be retiring from hip-hop at the end of 2023, stating he '[had] nothing else to prove'.

On October 13, 2023, Westside Gunn released his fifth studio album And Then You Pray For Me. The album is a sequel to Pray for Paris, with both albums' covers created by fashion designer Virgil Abloh. Gunn stated that it was his last studio album, but he would continue to release music as mixtapes.

In 2024, Gunn released the mixtape Still Praying. To promote the release he embarked on the Heels Have Eyes concert tour the same year. He created Fourth Rope, a wrestling promotion, and staged wrestling bouts with the concerts. On January 24, 2025, he announced his involvement in a new hardcore punk band called Dissension and posted a preview of a new song, "Black Hole".

On April 18, 2025, Gunn released Heels Have Eyes, named for his combined tour and wrestling promotion of the previous year. It contained the song "Egypt", which was later remixed to feature Doechii. Gunn featured on the opening track of JID's God Does Like Ugly. He released Heels Have Eyes 2 on August 28, and released Heels Have Eyes 3 on October 31.

In November 2026, Gunn released Heelmatic.

== Fashion career ==
In 2012, Gunn founded Fashion Rebels, his clothing brand. He has sat in the front row at New York Fashion Week and Paris Fashion Week, and owns clothes from Comme des Garçons and Dapper Dan's collaboration with Gucci. He was a frequent collaborator with Virgil Abloh, with Abloh designing some of Gunn's album covers.

In 2025, he debuted a pair of shoes with Saucony.

== Artistry ==
Gunn is noted for his sample-heavy choices for production, which often incorporates phonographic sampling to create a "lo-fi feel", as described by Greek rapper Stereo Mike. Vocally, he 'close mikes', which better captures his voice. He juxtaposes his lyrics about crime with high art and fashion.

== Personal life ==
Gunn is a devoted fan of wrestling; he has said that he attends SummerSlam and WrestleMania annually. In 2025, he disavowed WWE after he was ejected from a Raw event and was sent a cease and desist request. As a result, he changed the cover artwork for some of his albums, to no longer feature images of WWE wrestlers.

Gunn has amassed a collection of drawings, paintings and toys with an estimated value of almost $1,000,000; between 50 and 100 paintings in his collection were created solely for him. In 2017, he formed a business relationship with painter Isaac Pelayo after offering to purchase a painting of his, with Pelayo going on to create album covers for Gunn and Griselda rapper Armani Caesar.

== Discography ==
- Flygod (2016)
- Supreme Blientele (2018)
- Pray for Paris (2020)
- Who Made the Sunshine (2020)
- And Then You Pray for Me (2023)
- Heelmatic (2026)
- Flygod is An Awesome God III (2027)

== Filmography ==
=== Film ===
Year	Title	Role	Notes	Ref.
2021	Conflicted			
2023	Adolf		Short film	

=== Television ===
Year	Title	Role	Notes
2022	AEW Dynamite	Musical guest	
