= Armani Caesar =

American rapper (born 1989)

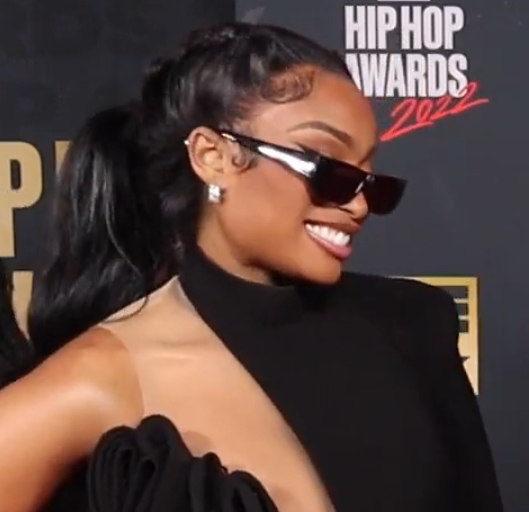
- Armani Caesar in October 2022

Background information
- Born: Joclynn Clyburn; June 5, 1989 (age 37); Buffalo, New York, U.S.
- Genre: East Coast hip-hop
- Occupations: Rapper; songwriter
- Instrument: Vocals
- Label: Griselda
- Website: armanicaesar.com

Joclynn Clyburn (born June 5, 1989), known professionally as Armani Caesar, is an American rapper. She is signed to Griselda Records.

== Early and personal life ==
Caesar was born on June 5, 1989, in Buffalo, New York. She attended the Buffalo Academy for Visual and Performing Arts from grades 5 to 12, and attended marketing classes in North Carolina Central University. She took a class called "Hip Hop Context 1973–1997", taught by 9th Wonder and Christopher Martin. She worked at strip clubs to support herself.

She has been a resident of Charlotte since 2017. In December 2023, she revealed she was pregnant in a photoshoot.

== Career ==
Caesar created her first song in DJ Shay's recording studio after finding a flier of his.

Caesar was signed to Westside Gunn's Griselda Records in 2020, becoming the label's first female act. Her first studio album, The Liz was released on September 18, 2020. Pitchfork rated the album a 7.2. The sequel, The Liz 2, was released on October 21, 2022. The singles were "Hunnit Dolla Hiccup", featuring Benny the Butcher and Stove God Cooks, "Paula Deen", featuring Westside Gunn, and "Diana", featuring Kodak Black. The album contains production by Daringer, Camouflage Monk, Denny Laflare and BeatKing. Pitchfork rated the album a 7.4. Both album covers were painted by Isaac Pelayo.

Outside of music, Caesar owns a clothing store, Armani's Closet. She has also written self-help ebooks.

== Artistry ==
Caesar's music has been described as "luxurious". She cites Lil' Kim, Missy Elliott and Trina as influences.

== Discography ==
- Bath & Body Work (2009)
- Hand Bag Addict (2011)
- Caesar's Palace (2015)
- Pretty Girls Get Played Too (2018)
- The Liz (2020)
- The Liz 2 (2022)
