= Daringer (producer) =

American record producer (born 1985)

- Born: Thomas Paladino; April 17, 1985 (age 41); Buffalo, New York, U.S.
- Genres: Boom bap; East Coast hip hop
- Occupation: Record producer
- Years active: 2005–present
- Label: Griselda

Thomas Paladino (born April 17, 1985), known professionally as Daringer, is an American record producer and an in-house producer for the musical collective Griselda. He is best known for his grimey and sinister boom bap production for fellow Buffalo artists such as Westside Gunn, Conway the Machine, and Benny the Butcher, as well as Meyhem Lauren and Rome Streetz. Daringer has been producing since 2005 and his dark, hard hitting 1990s inspired production style has come to define the Griselda sound. His name is a reference to the Daringer pistol, also called Derringer.

== Musical style ==
His style of production is considered dark and gritty, matching Griselda's Mafioso rap themes involving members' experience with gang violence and cocaine. The style is reminiscent of East Coast hip-hop of the 20th century, being influenced by the boom-bap instrumentation of golden age hip-hop and old school hip-hop and he frequently uses sampling in his hip-hop instrumentals (with the exception of WWCD). His music is also influenced by jazz rap due to his parents being jazz musicians.
