= 2 Chainz discography =

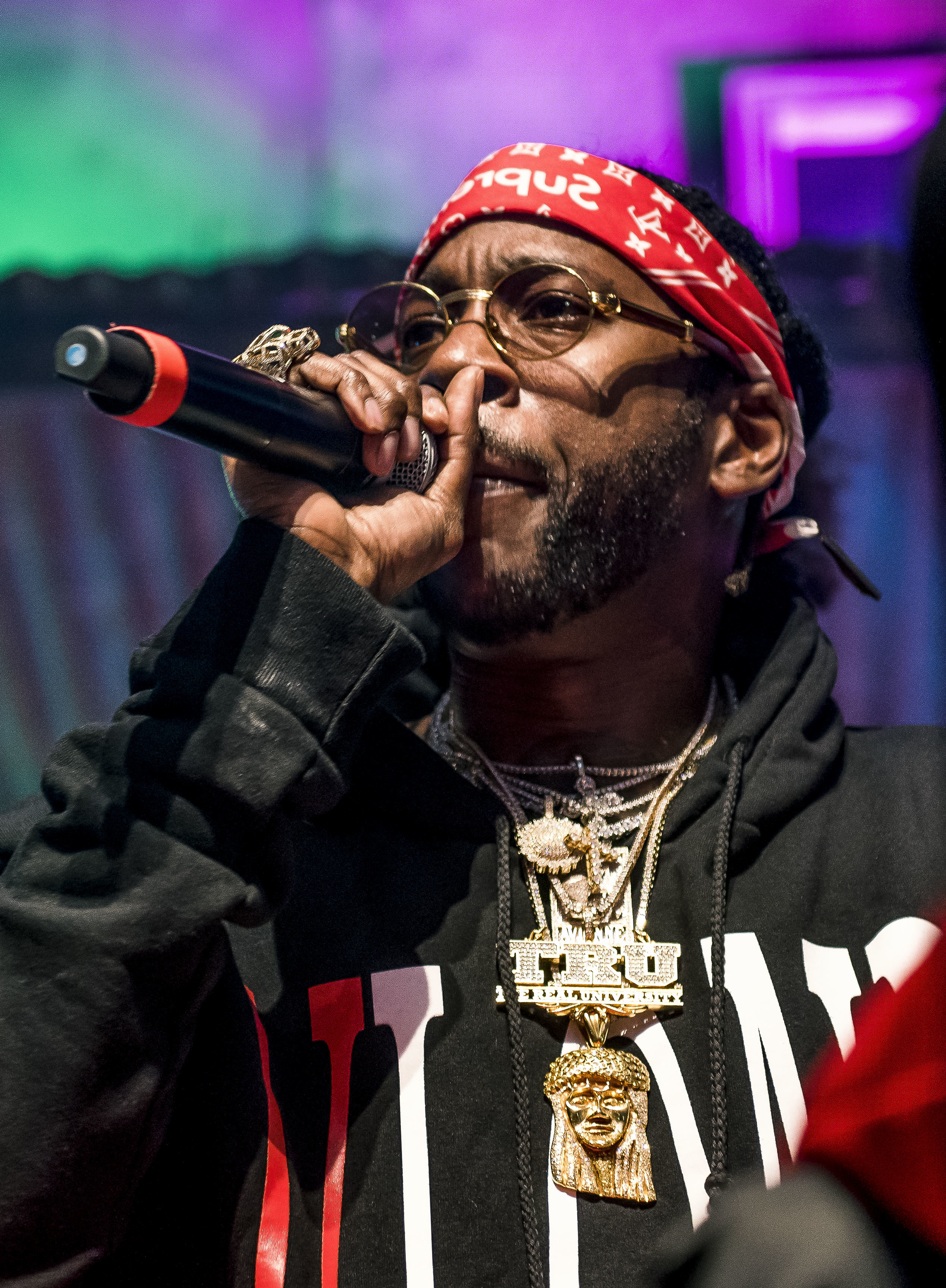
- 2 Chainz in 2017
- Studio albums: 8
- Singles: 119
- Music videos: 75
- Mixtapes: 10
- EPs: 5
- Promotional singles: 14

The discography of American rapper 2 Chainz, consists of eight studio albums, two collaborative studio albums, 10 mixtapes, 5 extended plays, 119 singles (including 79 as a featured artist), 14 promotional singles and 75 music videos.

== Albums ==
=== Studio albums ===
List of studio albums, with selected chart positions, sales figures and certifications
Title	Album details	Peak chart positions									Sales	Certifications
Title	Album details	US	US R&B/HH	US Rap	AUS	BEL (FL)	CAN	FRA	UK	UK R&B	Sales	Certifications
Based on a T.R.U. Story	Released: August 14, 2012; Label: Def Jam; Format: CD, LP, digital download, streaming	1	1	1	—	132	7	180	—	31	US: 623,000	RIAA: Platinum
B.O.A.T.S. II: Me Time	Released: September 10, 2013; Label: Def Jam; Format: CD, LP, digital download, streaming	3	2	1	—	153	11	—	87	10	US: 293,000	
ColleGrove	Released: March 4, 2016; Label: Def Jam; Format: CD, LP, digital download, streaming	4	2	2	—	—	20	—	—	—		RIAA: Gold
Pretty Girls Like Trap Music	Released: June 16, 2017; Label: Def Jam; Format: CD, LP, digital download, streaming	2	1	1	52	139	7	120	88	19		RIAA: Platinum; MC: Gold
Rap or Go to the League	Released: March 1, 2019; Label: Def Jam; Format: CD, LP, digital download, streaming	4	1	1	35	94	10	117	74	—		
So Help Me God!	Released: November 13, 2020; Label: Def Jam; Format: CD, LP, digital download, streaming	15	8	8	—	—	77	—	—	—		
Dope Don't Sell Itself	Released: February 4, 2022; Label: Def Jam; Format: CD, digital download, streaming	23	13	10	—	—	88	—	—	—		
Playaz Only Live Once	Released: December 4, 2026; Label: Def Jam; Format: CD, LP, digital download, streaming	—	—	—	—	—	—	—	—	—		
"—" denotes a recording that did not chart or was not released in that territory.

=== Collaborative albums ===
List of collaborative albums, with selected chart positions
Title	Album details	Peak chart positions	
Title	Album details	US	US R&B/HH
No Face No Case (with The Real University)	Released: February 7, 2020; Label: Atlantic; Format: CD, LP, digital download, streaming	182	—
Welcome 2 Collegrove (with Lil Wayne)	Released: November 17, 2023; Label: Def Jam; Format: CD, digital download, streaming	20	4
Life Is Beautiful (with Larry June and The Alchemist)	Released: February 7, 2025; Label: The Freeminded, ALC, Empire; Format: Digital download, streaming	89	35

== Extended plays ==
List of extended plays, with selected chart positions
Title	EP details	Peak chart positions	
Title	EP details	US	US R&B
Freebase	Released: May 5, 2014; Labels: The Real University; Format: CD, digital download, streaming	—	—
Felt Like Cappin	Released: January 27, 2016; Label: Imports; Format: Digital download, streaming	—	—
Hibachi for Lunch	Released: October 28, 2016; Label: Self-released; Format: Digital download, streaming	—	—
The Play Don't Care Who Makes It	Released: February 8, 2018; Label: Def Jam; Format: Digital download, streaming	58	27
Million Dollars Worth of Game	Released: January 21, 2022; Label: Universal; Format: Digital download, streaming	—	—
"—" denotes a recording that did not chart or was not released in that territory.

== Mixtapes ==
List of mixtapes, with selected chart positions
Title	Mixtape details	Peak chart positions
Title	Mixtape details	US R&B
Me Against the World	Released: 2007; Label: Duffle Bag Boyz; Format: Digital download	—
All Ice on Me	Released: August 3, 2009; Label: DTP; Format: Digital download	—
Trap-A-Velli	Released: January 3, 2009; Label: DTP, Strong Family, Def Jam; Format: Digital download	—
Me Against the World 2: Codeine Withdrawal	Released: April 14, 2010; Label: DTP; Format: Digital download	—
Trap-A-Velli 2: (The Residue)	Released: August 13, 2010; Label: Duffle Bag Boyz; Format: Digital download	—
Codeine Cowboy (A 2 Chainz Collective)	Released: February 22, 2011; Label: DTP; Format: Digital download	—
T.R.U. REALigion	Released: November 1, 2011; Label: Howie McDuffie Music Group; Format: Digital download	58
T.R.U. Jack City (with The Real University)	Released: January 27, 2015; Label: Self-released; Format: Digital download	—
Trap-A-Velli Tre	Released: August 13, 2015; Label: Self-released; Format: Digital download	—
Daniel Son; Necklace Don	Released: August 5, 2016; Label: Self-released; Format: Digital download	—
"—" denotes a recording that did not chart or was not released in that territory.

== Singles ==
=== As lead artist ===
List of singles as lead artist, with selected chart positions and certifications, showing year released and album name
Title	Year	Peak chart positions										Certifications	Album
Title	Year	US	US R&B /HH	US Rap	AUS	CAN	FRA	GER	NZ	SWI	UK	Certifications	Album
"Spend It"	2011	—	55	—	—	—	—	—	—	—	—		Codeine Cowboy (A 2 Chainz Collective)
"Mercy" (with Kanye West, Big Sean and Pusha T)	2012	13	1	1	60	46	101	—	—	—	55	RIAA: 8× Platinum; BPI: Gold; RMNZ: Platinum	Cruel Summer
"No Lie" (featuring Drake)	2012	24	1	1	—	—	—	—	—	—	—	RIAA: 3× Platinum	Based on a T.R.U. Story
"Birthday Song" (featuring Kanye West)	2012	47	10	7	—	—	—	—	—	—	—	RIAA: 2× Platinum	Based on a T.R.U. Story
"I'm Different"	2012	27	6	6	—	—	—	—	—	—	—	RIAA: 3× Platinum	Based on a T.R.U. Story
"We Own It (Fast & Furious)" (with Wiz Khalifa)	2013	16	4	3	6	14	9	5	6	3	6	RIAA: 3× Platinum; ARIA: 3× Platinum; BPI: Platinum; BVMI: 3× Gold; RMNZ: Platinum	Fast & Furious 6 soundtrack
"Feds Watching" (featuring Pharrell)	2013	66	18	12	—	—	—	—	—	—	—	RIAA: Platinum	B.O.A.T.S. II: Me Time
"Used 2"	2013	— (Note: "Used 2" did not enter the Billboard Hot 100, but peaked at number 11 on the Bubbling Under Hot 100 Singles chart.)	38	—	—	—	—	—	—	—	—	RIAA: Gold	B.O.A.T.S. II: Me Time
"Watch Out"	2015	64	19	19	—	—	—	—	—	—	—	RIAA: 2× Platinum	Trap-A-Velli Tre and ColleGrove
"Bounce" (featuring Lil Wayne)	2016	— (Note: "Bounce" did not enter the Billboard Hot 100, but peaked at number four on the Bubbling Under Hot 100 Singles chart.)	34	—	—	—	—	—	—	—	—		ColleGrove
"Gotta Lotta" (featuring Lil Wayne)	2016	100	33	20	—	—	—	—	—	—	—	RIAA: Gold	ColleGrove
"MFN Right" (solo or featuring Lil Wayne)	2016	—	— (Note: "MFN Right" did not enter the US Hot R&B/Hip-Hop Songs chart, but peaked at number eight on the Bubbling Under R&B/Hip-Hop Singles chart.)	—	—	—	—	—	—	—	—	RIAA: Gold	ColleGrove
"Champions" (with Kanye West, Gucci Mane, Big Sean, Travis Scott, Yo Gotti, Quavo and Desiigner)	2016	71	22	15	—	73	—	—	—	—	—	RIAA: Platinum; BPI: Silver	Non-album single
"Big Amount" (featuring Drake)	2016	— (Note: "Big Amount" did not enter the Billboard Hot 100, but peaked at number 18 on the Bubbling Under Hot 100 Singles chart.)	44	—	—	—	—	—	—	—	—	RIAA: Platinum	Daniel Son; Necklace Don & Pretty Girls Like Trap Music
"Good Drank" (featuring Quavo and Gucci Mane)	2017	70	32	22	—	—	—	—	—	—	—	RIAA: 2× Platinum	Hibachi for Lunch & Pretty Girls Like Trap Music
"It's a Vibe" (featuring Ty Dolla Sign, Trey Songz and Jhené Aiko)	2017	44	20	13	—	81	—	—	—	—	—	RIAA: 5× Platinum; BPI: Silver; MC: 3x Platinum; RMNZ: 3× Platinum	Pretty Girls Like Trap Music
"Gang Up" (with Young Thug, PnB Rock and Wiz Khalifa)	2017	— (Note: "Gang Up" did not enter the Billboard Hot 100, but peaked at number 13 on the Bubbling Under Hot 100 Singles chart.)	— (Note: "Gang Up" did not enter the Hot R&B/Hip-Hop Songs chart, but peaked at number four on the Bubbling Under R&B/Hip-Hop Singles chart.)	—	—	86	—	—	—	72	—	RIAA: Gold	The Fate of the Furious: The Album
"4 AM" (featuring Travis Scott)	2017	55	24	16	—	50	—	—	—	—	—	RIAA: 2× Platinum; RMNZ: Gold	Pretty Girls Like Trap Music
"2nd to None" (with Dreezy)	2018	—	—	—	—	—	—	—	—	—	—		Non-album singles
"Alive" (with Lil Jon and Offset)	2018	—	—	—	—	—	—	—	—	—	—	RIAA: Gold	Non-album singles
"Proud" (featuring YG and Offset)	2018	96	43	—	—	—	—	—	—	—	—	RIAA: Gold	The Play Don't Care Who Makes It
"Bigger Than You" (featuring Drake and Quavo)	2018	53	28	24	—	43	—	—	— (Note: "Bigger Than You" did not enter the NZ Top 40 Singles Chart, but peaked at number eight on the NZ Heatseeker Singles Chart.)	—	—	RIAA: Platinum; ARIA: Gold	Non-album single
"Kill 'Em with Success" (with Eearz, ScHoolboy Q, 2 Chainz and Mike WiLL Made-It)	2018	—	—	—	—	—	—	—	—	—	—		Creed II: The Album
"Hot Wings"	2018	—	—	—	—	—	—	—	—	—	—		Non-album single
"Girl's Best Friend" (featuring Ty Dolla Sign)	2018	—	—	—	—	—	—	—	—	—	—		Rap or Go to the League
"Rule the World" (featuring Ariana Grande)	2019	94	37	—	—	93	—	—	— (Note: "Rule the World" did not enter the NZ Top 40 Singles Chart, but peaked at number eleven on the NZ Hot Singles Chart.)	—	—	RIAA: Gold	Rap or Go to the League
"Dead Man Walking" (featuring Future)	2020	—	—	—	—	—	—	—	—	—	—		Non-album singles
"NO TV"	2020	—	—	—	—	—	—	—	—	—	—		Non-album singles
"Devil Just Trying to Be Seen" (with Skooly)	2020	—	—	—	—	—	—	—	—	—	—		Non-album singles
"Money Maker" (featuring Lil Wayne)	2020	—	—	—	—	—	—	—	—	—	—		So Help Me God!
"Quarantine Thick" (featuring Latto)	2020	— (Note: "Quarantine Thick" did not enter the Billboard Hot 100, but peaked at number 17 on the Bubbling Under Hot 100 Singles chart.)	—	—	—	—	—	—	—	—	—		So Help Me God!
"Grey Area"	2021	—	—	—	—	—	—	—	—	—	—		So Help Me God!
"Top of the Hill" (with Iakopo and Uneekint featuring DNoRRi and Edison)	2021	—	—	—	—	—	—	—	—	—	—		Non-album single
"Touch Down 2 Cause Hell (Bow Bow Bow)" [Remix] (with Hd4president featuring Fredo Bang)	2021	—	—	—	—	—	—	—	—	—	—		To Da Max
"Mortgage Free" (with DJ Premier)	2021	—	—	—	—	—	—	—	—	—	—		Non-album single
"Motorola Era" (with AZ)	2022	—	—	—	—	—	—	—	—	—	—		Doe or Die II
"Million Dollars Worth of Game" (featuring 42 Dugg)	2022	— (Note: "Million Dollars Worth of Game" did not enter the Billboard Hot 100, but peaked at number 12 on the Bubbling Under Hot 100 Singles chart.)	—	—	—	—	—	—	— (Note: "Million Dollars Worth of Game" did not enter the NZ Top 40 Singles Chart, but peaked at number 27 on the NZ Hot Singles Chart.)	—	—	RIAA: Gold	Dope Don't Sell Itself
"Pop Music" (featuring Moneybagg Yo and BeatKing)	2022	— (Note: "Pop Music" did not enter the Billboard Hot 100, but peaked at number 15 on the Bubbling Under Hot 100 Singles chart.)	—	—	—	—	—	—	—	—	—		Dope Don't Sell Itself
"Cater" (with Tink)	2022	—	—	—	—	—	—	—	—	—	—		Non-album single
"2 Step"	2022	—	—	—	—	—	—	—	—	—	—		House Party
"Presha" (with Lil Wayne)	2023	— (Note: "Presha" did not enter the Billboard Hot 100, but peaked at number one on the Bubbling Under Hot 100 Singles chart.)	32	—	—	—	—	—	—	—	—		Welcome 2 Collegrove
"Long Story Short" (with Lil Wayne)	2023	— (Note: "Long Story Short" did not enter the Billboard Hot 100, but peaked at number six on the Bubbling Under Hot 100 Singles chart.)	40	—	—	—	—	—	—	—	—		Welcome 2 Collegrove
"—" denotes a recording that did not chart or was not released in that territory.

=== As featured artist ===
List of singles as featured artist, with selected chart positions and certifications, showing year released and album name
Title	Year	Peak chart positions										Certifications	Album
Title	Year	US	US R&B	US Rap	AUS	CAN	FRA	GER	IRL	SWI	UK	Certifications	Album
"We Up in Here" (LA da Boomman featuring Tity Boi and Yo Gotti)	2011	—	—	—	—	—	—	—	—	—	—		Non-album single
"I'm on Worldstar" (Drumma Boy featuring Tity Boi, Gucci Mane and Young Buck)	2011	—	—	—	—	—	—	—	—	—	—		The Birth of D-Boy Fresh
"Money on the Floor" (Big K.R.I.T. featuring 8Ball & MJG and 2 Chainz)	2011	—	— (Note: "Money on the Floor" did not enter the Hot R&B/Hip-Hop Songs chart, but peaked at number one on the Bubbling Under R&B/Hip-Hop Singles chart.)	—	—	—	—	—	—	—	—		Live from the Underground
"Helicopter" (Lil Scrappy featuring 2 Chainz and Twista)	2011	—	—	—	—	—	—	—	—	—	—		Tha Merlo Jonez EP and Tha Grustle
"Da Ghetto" (Pimpin featuring 2 Chainz)	2011	—	—	—	—	—	—	—	—	—	—		Non-album singles
"Where U Get That" (Pimpin featuring 2 Chainz)	2011	—	—	—	—	—	—	—	—	—	—		Non-album singles
"Yao Ming" (David Banner featuring Lil Wayne and 2 Chainz)	2011	—	—	—	—	—	—	—	—	—	—		Sex, Drugs & Video Games
"U Did That" (Teairra Marí featuring 2 Chainz)	2012	—	—	—	—	—	—	—	—	—	—		Unfinished Business
"Where I Know U Like" (Tha Dogg Pound featuring 2 Chainz)	2012	—	—	—	—	—	—	—	—	—	—		D.P.G.C'ology
"Beez in the Trap" (Nicki Minaj featuring 2 Chainz)	2012	48	7	7	—	—	—	—	74	—	131	RIAA: 3× Platinum; BPI: Silver; RMNZ: Gold	Pink Friday: Roman Reloaded
"How I'm Livin'" (OG Boo Dirty featuring 2 Chainz)	2012	—	—	—	—	—	—	—	—	—	—		Born a Soldier, Die a Vet
"Breakfast (Syrup)" (Kreayshawn featuring 2 Chainz)	2012	—	—	—	—	—	—	—	—	—	—		Somethin' 'Bout Kreay
"My Moment" (DJ Drama featuring 2 Chainz, Meek Mill and Jeremih)	2012	89	23	16	—	—	—	—	—	—	—		Quality Street Music
"Grindmode" (YG featuring 2 Chainz and Nipsey Hussle)	2012	—	—	—	—	—	—	—	—	—	—		4 Hunnid Degreez
"In My Trunk" (Dev featuring 2 Chainz)	2012	—	—	—	—	—	—	—	—	—	—		Non-album single
"Bandz a Make Her Dance" (Juicy J featuring Lil Wayne and 2 Chainz)	2012	29	6	5	—	—	—	—	—	—	—	RIAA: Platinum	Stay Trippy
"Do My Dance" (Tyga featuring 2 Chainz)	2012	— (Note: "Do My Dance" did not enter the Billboard Hot 100, but peaked at number 11 on the Bubbling Under Hot 100 Singles chart.)	32	22	—	—	—	—	—	—	—	RIAA: Gold	Well Done 3
"Fuckin' Problems" (ASAP Rocky featuring Drake, 2 Chainz and Kendrick Lamar)	2012	8	2	2	78	65	30	86	—	65	50	RIAA: 8× Platinum; ARIA: Platinum; BVMI: Gold; BPI: Platinum; MC: Platinum; RMNZ: 4× Platinum	Long. Live. ASAP
"Leggo" (B. Smyth featuring 2 Chainz)	2012	— (Note: "Leggo" did not enter the Billboard Hot 100, but peaked at number 20 on the Bubbling Under Hot 100 Singles chart.)	41	—	—	—	—	—	—	—	—		Non-album single
"Marble Floors" (French Montana featuring Lil Wayne, Rick Ross and 2 Chainz)	2012	—	— (Note: "Marble Floors" did not enter the Hot R&B/Hip-Hop Songs chart, but peaked at number one on the Bubbling Under R&B/Hip-Hop Singles chart.)	—	—	—	—	—	—	—	—		Excuse My French
"Tadow" (P.A.P.I. featuring French Montana, 2 Chainz and Pusha T)	2013	—	—	—	—	—	—	—	—	—	—		Student of the Game
"R.I.P." (Jeezy featuring 2 Chainz)	2013	58	16	12	—	—	—	—	—	—	—	RIAA: Platinum	It's Tha World
"Charades" (Chrisette Michele featuring 2 Chainz)	2013	—	—	—	—	—	—	—	—	—	—		Better
"Rich As Fuck" (Lil Wayne featuring 2 Chainz)	2013	38	11	9	—	—	—	—	—	—	—	RIAA: 3× Platinum	I Am Not a Human Being II
"Upper Echelon" (Travis Scott featuring T.I. and 2 Chainz)	2013	—	—	—	—	—	—	—	—	—	—	RIAA: Gold	Owl Pharaoh
"Fan" (Hit-Boy featuring 2 Chainz)	2013	—	— (Note: "Fan" did not enter the Hot R&B/Hip-Hop Songs chart, but peaked at number seven on the Bubbling Under R&B/Hip-Hop Singles chart.)	—	—	—	—	—	—	—	—		All I've Ever Dreamed Of
"HeadBand" (B.o.B featuring 2 Chainz)	2013	53	16	11	—	67	—	57	—	—	—	RIAA: 2× Platinum; RMNZ: Platinum	Underground Luxury
"Bubble Butt" (Remix) (Major Lazer featuring Bruno Mars, 2 Chainz, Tyga and Mystic)	2013	—	—	—	39	—	—	—	—	—	196	RIAA: Gold	Free the Universe (extended version)
"Gold Rush" (Clinton Sparks featuring 2 Chainz, Macklemore and D.A.)	2013	—	—	—	—	—	—	—	—	—	—		ICONoclast
"Entertainment 2.0" (Sean Paul featuring Juicy J, 2 Chainz and Nicki Minaj)	2013	—	— (Note: "Entertainment" did not enter the Hot R&B/Hip-Hop Songs chart, but peaked at number two on the Bubbling Under R&B/Hip-Hop Singles chart.)	—	—	94	—	—	—	—	—		Full Frequency
"Trampoline" (Tinie Tempah featuring 2 Chainz)	2013	—	—	—	—	—	—	—	29	—	3	BPI: Silver	Demonstration
"When I Feel Like It" (Fabolous featuring 2 Chainz)	2013	—	— (Note: "When I Feel Like It" did not enter the Hot R&B/Hip-Hop Songs chart, but peaked at number five on the Bubbling Under R&B/Hip-Hop Singles chart.)	—	—	—	—	—	—	—	—		Loso's Way 2: Rise to Power
"My Story" (R. Kelly featuring 2 Chainz)	2013	89	27	—	—	—	—	—	—	—	—		Black Panties
"Talk Dirty" (Jason Derulo featuring 2 Chainz)	2013	3	2	—	1	3	3	1	2	4	1	RIAA: 4× Platinum; ARIA: 7× Platinum; BPI: 2× Platinum; BVMI: Platinum; IFPI SWI: Platinum; RMNZ: 3× Platinum	Tattoos
"All Me" (Drake featuring 2 Chainz and Big Sean)	2013	20	6	4	—	72	141	—	—	—	112	RIAA: 2× Platinum; ARIA: Gold; BPI: Silver; RMNZ: Gold	Nothing Was the Same
"Fire" (Bun B featuring Rick Ross, 2 Chainz and Serani)	2013	—	—	—	—	—	—	—	—	—	—		Trill OG: The Epilogue
"Keep Calm" (DJ Kay Slay featuring Juicy J, Jadakiss, 2 Chainz and Rico Love)	2013	—	—	—	—	—	—	—	—	—	—		Non-album single
"Cut Her Off" (K Camp featuring 2 Chainz)	2013	49	13	6	—	—	—	—	—	—	—	RIAA: Platinum	In Due Time
"Only That Real" (Iamsu! featuring 2 Chainz and Sage the Gemini)	2014	—	— (Note: "Only That Real" did not enter the Hot R&B/Hip-Hop Songs chart, but peaked at number six on the Bubbling Under R&B/Hip-Hop Singles chart.)	—	—	—	—	—	—	—	—		Sincerely Yours
"24 Hours" (TeeFlii featuring 2 Chainz)	2014	85	23	12	—	—	—	—	—	—	—		Starr
"Down on Me" (DJ Mustard featuring Ty Dolla Sign and 2 Chainz)	2014	—	—	—	—	—	—	—	—	—	—		10 Summers
"Drop Girl" (Ice Cube featuring Redfoo and 2 Chainz)	2014	—	—	—	—	—	—	—	—	—	—		Non-album single
"Burnin' Up" (Jessie J featuring 2 Chainz)	2014	86	—	—	—	—	—	—	—	—	73		Sweet Talker
"Party Ain't a Party" (Jamie Foxx featuring 2 Chainz)	2014	—	—	—	—	—	—	—	—	—	—		Non-album single
"U Guessed It" (Remix) (OG Maco featuring 2 Chainz)	2014	90	27	20	—	—	—	—	—	—	—		OG Maco
"Mama Ain't Proud" (Guy Sebastian featuring 2 Chainz)	2014	—	—	—	17	—	—	92	—	—	—	ARIA: Gold	Madness
"Focused On You" (Eric Bellinger featuring 2 Chainz)	2014	—	—	—	—	—	—	—	—	—	—		Cuffin Season
"Double Tap" (Jordin Sparks featuring 2 Chainz)	2015	—	—	—	—	—	—	—	—	—	—		Right Here, Right Now
"Hood Go Crazy" (Tech N9ne featuring B.o.B. and 2 Chainz)	2015	90	28	17	—	—	—	—	—	—	—	RIAA: Platinum; RMNZ: Gold	Special Effects
"Get Low" (50 Cent featuring Jeremih, T.I. and 2 Chainz)	2015	—	—	—	—	—	—	—	—	—	—		Non-album single
"3500" (Travis Scott featuring Future and 2 Chainz)	2015	82	25	18	—	—	—	—	—	—	—	RIAA: Platinum; RMNZ: Gold	Rodeo
"No Problem" (Chance the Rapper featuring Lil Wayne & 2 Chainz)	2016	43	14	10	—	94	—	—	—	—	—	RIAA: 4× Platinum; BPI: Silver; RMNZ: 2× Platinum	Coloring Book
"Magic City Monday" (Jeezy featuring Future and 2 Chainz)	2016	—	— (Note: "Magic City Monday" did not enter the Hot R&B/Hip-Hop Songs chart, but peaked at number two on the Bubbling Under R&B/Hip-Hop Singles chart.)	—	—	—	—	—	—	—	—		Non-album single
"I Want" (MadeinTYO featuring 2 Chainz)	2016	—	—	—	—	—	—	—	—	—	—	RIAA: Platinum	You Are Forgiven
"Buy Back the Block" (Rick Ross featuring Gucci Mane and 2 Chainz)	2016	—	—	—	—	—	—	—	—	—	—		Rather You Than Me
"Castro" (Yo Gotti featuring Kanye West, Big Sean, 2 Chainz and Quavo)	2016	— (Note: "Castro" did not enter the Billboard Hot 100, but peaked at number 16 on the Bubbling Under Hot 100 Singles chart.)	— (Note: "Castro" did not enter the Hot R&B/Hip-Hop Songs chart, but peaked at number six on the Bubbling Under R&B/Hip-Hop Singles chart.)	—	—	—	—	—	—	—	—		White Friday (CM9)
"Throw Myself a Party" (Cashmere Cat featuring 2 Chainz, Starrah, and Tory Lanez)	2016	—	—	—	—	—	—	—	—	—	—		Wild Love
"Petty" (Fre$h featuring 2 Chainz and 50 Cent)	2017	—	—	—	—	—	—	—	—	—	—		frēsh•ism
"Without U" (Steve Aoki & DVBBS featuring 2 Chainz)	2017	—	—	—	—	—	—	—	—	—	—		Steve Aoki Presents Kolony
"Floor Seats" (Jeezy featuring 2 Chainz)	2017	—	—	—	—	—	—	—	—	—	—		Pressure
"Both Eyes Closed" (Gucci Mane featuring 2 Chainz & Young Dolph)	2017	—	—	—	—	—	—	—	—	—	—	RIAA: Gold	Droptopwop
"Yes" (Louisa Johnson featuring 2 Chainz)	2018	—	—	—	—	—	—	—	—	—	65		Non-album single
"Ikuyo" (KYLE featuring 2 Chainz and Sophia Black)	2018	—	—	—	—	—	—	—	—	—	—		Light of Mine
"Accelerate" (Christina Aguilera featuring Ty Dolla $ign and 2 Chainz)	2018	— (Note: "Accelerate" did not enter the Billboard Hot 100, but peaked at number 24 on the Bubbling Under Hot 100 Singles chart.)	—	—	—	—	157	—	—	—	—		Liberation
"Big Bank" (YG featuring 2 Chainz, Big Sean and Nicki Minaj)	2018	16	13	10	—	51	—	—	—	—	—	RIAA: 5× Platinum; RMNZ: Platinum	Stay Dangerous
"How Dat Sound" (Trey Songz featuring 2 Chainz and Yo Gotti)	2018	—	—	—	—	—	—	—	—	—	—		28
"That's On Me" (Remix) (Yella Beezy featuring 2 Chainz, T.I., Rich the Kid, Jeezy, Boosie Badazz and Trapboy Freddy)	2018	—	—	—	—	—	—	—	—	—	—	RIAA: Platinum	Non-album single
"Too Playa" (Migos featuring 2 Chainz)	2018	—	—	—	—	—	—	—	—	—	—	RIAA: Gold	Culture II
""Olha a Explosão" (Remix)" (Kevinho featuring 2 Chainz, French Montana & Nacho)	2018	—	—	—	—	—	—	—	—	—	—	RIAA: Platinum	Non-album single
"Fast Lane" (Brody B. featuring 2 Chainz)	2019	—	—	—	—	—	—	—	—	—	—		Weekend At Brody's
"Thot Box" (Hitmaka featuring Meek Mill, 2 Chainz, A Boogie wit da Hoodie, Tyga and YBN Nahmir)	2019	—	—	—	—	—	—	—	—	—	—		Big Tuh
"Purple Minnesota" (Saint Vinci and YSL Fireboy featuring 2 Chainz and DJ Envy)	2020	—	—	—	—	—	—	—	—	—	—		Legendary Weekend
"Breakin' U Off" (TM88 and Rich The Kid featuringTy Dolla $ign, 2 Chainz andSouthside)	2020	—	—	—	—	—	—	—	—	—	—		Non-album singles
"Nah Nah Nah" (Remix) (Kanye West featuring DaBaby and 2 Chainz)	2020	—	—	—	—	—	—	—	—	—	—		Non-album singles
"Play Around" (Statik Selektah featuring Conway the Machine, 2 Chainz, Killer Mike and Allan Kingdom)	2020	—	—	—	—	—	—	—	—	—	—		The Balancing Act
"Dope Boys & Trap Gods" (Young Scooter and Zaytoven featuring 2 Chainz and Rick Ross)	2020	—	—	—	—	—	—	—	—	—	—		Zaystreet
"Baddest" (Yung Bleu featuring Chris Brown and 2 Chainz)	2021	56	17	12	—	—	—	—	—	—	—	RIAA: Gold	Moon Boy
"Big Tuh" (Lou Will featuring Lil Wayne and 2 Chainz)	2021	—	—	—	—	—	—	—	—	—	—		Non-album singles
"SDAB" (Beatking featuring 2 Chainz and Juicy J)	2021	—	—	—	—	—	—	—	—	—	—		Non-album singles
"Appreciation" (Ant Clemons featuring 2 Chainz and Ty Dolla $ign)	2021	—	—	—	—	—	—	—	—	—	—		Non-album singles
"Rose Gold Stripper Pole" (Remix) (KenTheMan featuring 2 Chainz)	2021	—	—	—	—	—	—	—	—	—	—		Non-album singles
"Land of the Free" (Jacquees featuring 2 Chainz)	2021	—	—	—	—	—	—	—	—	—	—		Non-album singles
"Sunday Again" (6lack featuring 2 Chainz)	2026	—	—	—	—	—	—	—	—	—	—		Love is the New Gangsta
"—" denotes a recording that did not chart or was not released in that territory.

=== Promotional singles ===
List of promotional singles, with selected chart positions, showing year released and album name
Title	Year	Peak chart positions	Album
Title	Year	US R&B/HH	Album
"Oh My" (Remix) (DJ Drama featuring Trey Songz, 2 Chainz and Big Sean)	2011	—	Third Power
"Let It Go" (Remix) (Red Café featuring Diddy, French Montana and 2 Chainz)	2012	—	Non-album singles
"No Country for Old Men" (Fat Joe featuring 2 Chainz and French Montana)	2012	—	Non-album singles
"Wild Boy" (Remix) (MGK featuring 2 Chainz, French Montana, Meek Mill, Mystikal, Steve-O and Yo Gotti)	2012	—	Non-album singles
"Oh Yeah" (Chris Brown featuring Snoop Dogg and 2 Chainz)	2012	—	Non-album singles
"Sweat" (Ciara featuring 2 Chainz)	2012	86	Non-album singles
"U.O.E.N.O." (Remix) (Rocko featuring Future and 2 Chainz)	2013	—	Non-album singles
"Bugatti" (Remix) (Ace Hood featuring Wiz Khalifa, T.I., Meek Mill, French Montana, 2 Chainz, Future, DJ Khaled and Birdman)	2013	—	Trials & Tribulations
"Who I Am" (Pusha T featuring 2 Chainz and Big Sean)	2013	—	My Name Is My Name
"Where U Been?" (featuring Cap1)	2013	— (Note: "Where U Been?" did not enter the Hot R&B/Hip-Hop Songs chart, but peaked at number one on the Bubbling Under R&B/Hip-Hop Singles chart.)	B.O.A.T.S. II: Me Time
"Netflix" (featuring Fergie)	2013	— (Note: "Netflix" did not enter the Hot R&B/Hip-Hop Songs chart, but peaked at number six on the Bubbling Under R&B/Hip-Hop Singles chart.)	B.O.A.T.S. II: Me Time
"Turn Down for What" (Remix) (DJ Snake and Lil Jon featuring Juicy J, 2 Chainz and French Montana)	2014	—	Non-album singles
"Smartphone"	2017	—	Non-album singles
"Chloraseptic" (Remix) (Eminem featuring 2 Chainz and Phresher)	2018	—	Non-album singles
"—" denotes a recording that did not chart or was not released in that territory.

== Other charted and certified songs ==
List of songs, with selected chart positions and certifications, showing year released and album name
Title	Year	Peak chart positions						Certifications	Album
Title	Year	US	US R&B	US Rap	CAN	FRA	NZ Hot	Certifications	Album
"Fightin' in the Club" (I-20 featuring Chingy, Lil Fate and Tity Boi)	2004	—	— (Note: "Fightin' in the Club" did not enter the Hot R&B/Hip-Hop Songs chart, but peaked at number two on the Bubbling Under R&B/Hip-Hop Singles chart.)	—	—	—	—		Self Explanatory
"Boo" (featuring Yo Gotti)	2010	—	76	—	—	—	—		Trap-A-Velli 2 (The Residue) and Codeine Cowboy (A 2 Chainz Collective)
"SupaFreak" (Young Jeezy featuring 2 Chainz)	2011	—	39	24	—	—	—	RIAA: Gold	Thug Motivation 103: Hustlerz Ambition
"Falling to Pieces" (Jenna featuring 2 Chainz)	2012	—	— (Note: "Falling to Pieces" did not enter the Hot R&B/Hip-Hop Songs chart, but peaked at number 18 on the Bubbling Under R&B/Hip-Hop Singles chart.)	—	—	—	—		Non-album song
"Hood Rich Anthem" (DJ Scream featuring 2 Chainz, Future, Fozzie Bear, Yo Gotti and Gucci Mane)	2012	—	96	—	—	—	—		Long Live the Hustle
"Yuck!" (featuring Lil Wayne)	2012	80	48	—	—	—	—		Based on a T.R.U. Story
"Riot"	2012	— (Note: "Riot" did not enter the Billboard Hot 100, but peaked at number 18 on the Bubbling Under Hot 100 Singles chart.)	54	—	—	—	—	RIAA: Gold	Based on a T.R.U. Story
"I Luv Dem Strippers" (featuring Nicki Minaj)	2012	— (Note: "I Luv Dem Strippers" did not enter the Billboard Hot 100, but peaked at number 21 on the Bubbling Under Hot 100 Singles chart.)	41	—	—	—	—	RIAA: Gold	Based on a T.R.U. Story
"Crack"	2012	—	— (Note: "Crack" did not enter the Hot R&B/Hip-Hop Songs chart, but peaked at number two on the Bubbling Under R&B/Hip-Hop Singles chart.)	—	—	—	—		Based on a T.R.U. Story
"The One" (with Kanye West, Big Sean and Marsha Ambrosius)	2012	— (Note: "The One" did not enter the Billboard Hot 100, but peaked at number 11 on the Bubbling Under Hot 100 Singles chart.)	— (Note: "The One" did not enter the Hot R&B/Hip-Hop Songs chart, but peaked at number nine on the Bubbling Under R&B/Hip-Hop Singles chart.)	—	—	—	—		Cruel Summer
"The Morning" (with Raekwon, Pusha T, Common, Cyhi the Prynce, Kid Cudi and D'banj)	2012	— (Note: "The Morning" did not enter the Billboard Hot 100, but peaked at number 19 on the Bubbling Under Hot 100 Singles chart.)	49	—	—	—	—		Cruel Summer
"C'est la vie" (Booba featuring 2 Chainz)	2012	—	—	—	—	153	—		Futur
"It's Nothin'" (Wiz Khalifa featuring 2 Chainz)	2012	— (Note: "It's Nothin'" did not enter the Billboard Hot 100, but peaked at number seven on the Bubbling Under Hot 100 Singles chart.)	34	—	—	—	—		O.N.I.F.C.
"Ali Bomaye" (Game featuring 2 Chainz and Rick Ross)	2012	—	— (Note: "Ali Bomaye" did not enter the Hot R&B/Hip-Hop Songs chart, but peaked at number one on the Bubbling Under R&B/Hip-Hop Singles chart.)	—	—	—	—	BPI: Silver; RMNZ: Gold	Jesus Piece
"Days and Days" (Lil Wayne featuring 2 Chainz)	2013	— (Note: "Days and Days" did not enter the Billboard Hot 100, but peaked at number eight on the Bubbling Under Hot 100 Singles chart.)	37	—	—	—	—		I Am Not a Human Being II
"Hijack" (Tyga featuring 2 Chainz)	2013	— (Note: "Hijack" did not enter the Billboard Hot 100, but peaked at number 11 on the Bubbling Under Hot 100 Singles chart.)	39	—	—	—	—		Hotel California
"Mula" (Remix) (Big Sean featuring 2 Chainz, Meek Mill and Earlly Mac)	2013	—	— (Note: "Mula" did not enter the Hot R&B/Hip-Hop Songs chart, but peaked at number four on the Bubbling Under R&B/Hip-Hop Singles chart.)	—	—	—	—		Hall of Fame
"I Do It" (featuring Drake and Lil Wayne)	2013	94	31	23	—	—	—		B.O.A.T.S. II: Me Time
"What They Want" (Schoolboy Q featuring 2 Chainz)	2014	—	— (Note: "What They Want" did not enter the Hot R&B/Hip-Hop Songs chart, but peaked at number four on the Bubbling Under R&B/Hip-Hop Singles chart.)	—	—	—	—	RIAA: Gold	Oxymoron
"Don't Shoot" (The Game featuring Rick Ross, 2 Chainz, Diddy, Fabolous, Wale, DJ Khaled, Swizz Beatz, Yo Gotti, Currensy, Problem, King Pharoah and TGT)	2014	—	—	—	—	—	—		Non-album song
"Valet" (Eric Bellinger featuring Fetty Wap And 2 Chainz)	2015	—	—	—	—	—	—	RMNZ: Gold	Cuffing Season, Pt. 2
"Smell Like Money" (featuring Lil Wayne)	2016	—	45	—	—	—	—		ColleGrove
"Money Made Me Do It" (Post Malone featuring 2 Chainz)	2016	—	—	—	—	—	—	MC: Platinum; RMNZ: Gold	August 26th
"Deadz" (featuring Migos)	2017	— (Note: "Deadz" did not enter the Billboard Hot 100, but peaked at number five on the Bubbling Under Hot 100 Singles chart.)	45	—	—	—	—		Culture
"Sacrifices" (Drake featuring 2 Chainz and Young Thug)	2017	36	19	12	26	173	—	ARIA: Gold; BPI: Silver	More Life
"Realize" (featuring Nicki Minaj)	2017	— (Note: "Realize" did not enter the Billboard Hot 100, but peaked at number three on the Bubbling Under Hot 100 Singles chart.)	50	—	—	—	—		Pretty Girls Like Trap Music
"Blue Cheese" (featuring Migos)	2017	— (Note: "Blue Cheese" did not enter the Billboard Hot 100, but peaked at number 11 on the Bubbling Under Hot 100 Singles chart.)	— (Note: "Blue Cheese" did not enter the Hot R&B/Hip-Hop Songs chart, but peaked at number one on the Bubbling Under R&B/Hip-Hop Singles chart.)	—	—	—	—	RIAA: Gold	Pretty Girls Like Trap Music
"Poor Fool" (featuring Swae Lee)	2017	—	— (Note: "Poor Fool" did not enter the Hot R&B/Hip-Hop Songs chart, but peaked at number six on the Bubbling Under R&B/Hip-Hop Singles chart.)	—	—	—	—		Pretty Girls Like Trap Music
"Trap Check"	2017	—	— (Note: "Trap Check" did not enter the Hot R&B/Hip-Hop Songs chart, but peaked at number seven on the Bubbling Under R&B/Hip-Hop Singles chart.)	—	—	—	—		Pretty Girls Like Trap Music
"Riverdale Rd"	2017	—	— (Note: "Riverdale Rd" did not enter the Hot R&B/Hip-Hop Songs chart, but peaked at number eight on the Bubbling Under R&B/Hip-Hop Singles chart.)	—	—	—	—		Pretty Girls Like Trap Music
"Saturday Night"	2017	—	— (Note: "Saturday Night" did not enter the Hot R&B/Hip-Hop Songs chart, but peaked at number 10 on the Bubbling Under R&B/Hip-Hop Singles chart.)	—	—	—	—		Pretty Girls Like Trap Music
"X" (with Schoolboy Q and Saudi)	2018	49	25	21	41	185	—	RIAA: Platinum; RMNZ: Platinum	Black Panther: The Album
"Anyway" (Lil Baby featuring 2 Chainz & Gucci Mane)	2018	—	—	—	—	—	—	RIAA: Gold	Street Gossip
"Forgiven" (featuring Marsha Ambrosius)	2019	— (Note: "Forgiven" did not enter the Billboard Hot 100, but peaked at number 23 on the Bubbling Under Hot 100 chart.)	—	—	—	—	—		Rap or Go to the League
"Money in the Way"	2019	— (Note: "Money in the Way" did not enter the Billboard Hot 100, but peaked at number 19 on the Bubbling Under Hot 100 chart.)	—	—	—	—	—		Rap or Go to the League
"High Top Versace" (featuring Young Thug)	2019	— (Note: "High Top Versace" did not enter the Billboard Hot 100, but peaked at number six on the Bubbling Under Hot 100 chart.)	45	—	—	—	—		Rap or Go to the League
"Whip" (featuring Travis Scott)	2019	75	31	—	99	—	19		Rap or Go to the League
"Momma I Hit a Lick" (featuring Kendrick Lamar)	2019	100	40	—	—	—	20		Rap or Go to the League
"Go Crazy" (Megan Thee Stallion featuring Big Sean and 2 Chainz)	2020	— (Note: "Go Crazy" did not enter the Billboard Hot 100, but peaked at number 12 on the Bubbling Under Hot 100 chart.)	—	—	—	—	—		Good News
"Bad Vibe" (Quando Rondo featuring A Boogie Wit da Hoodie & 2 Chainz)	2020	—	—	—	—	—	—	MC: Gold	
"Givin' Up (Not the One)" (with Don Toliver and 21 Savage)	2023	— (Note: "Givin' Up (Not the One)" did not enter the Billboard Hot 100, but peaked at number seven on the Bubbling Under Hot 100 chart.)	45	—	87	—	—		Spider-Man: Across the Spider-Verse (Soundtrack from and Inspired by the Motion Picture)
"Big Diamonds" (with Lil Wayne featuring 21 Savage)	2023	— (Note: "Big Diamonds" did not enter the Billboard Hot 100, but peaked at number 19 on the Bubbling Under Hot 100 chart.)	—	—	—	—	36		Welcome 2 Collegrove
"Transparency" (with Lil Wayne featuring Usher)	2023	— (Note: "Transparency" did not enter the Billboard Hot 100, but peaked at number three on the Bubbling Under Hot 100 chart.)	35	—	—	—	25		Welcome 2 Collegrove
"Cotton Candy" (with Lil Wayne)	2025	93	23	16	—	—	—		Tha Carter VI
"—" denotes a recording that did not chart or was not released in that territory.

== Guest appearances ==
List of non-single guest appearances, with other performing artists, showing year released and album name
Title	Year	Other artist(s)	Album
"Break Sumthin'"	2002	Ludacris, Shawnna, Lil' Fate, I-20	Golden Grain
"Smokin' Dro"	2002	I-20, Ludacris	Golden Grain
"A-Town Hatz"	2002	Lil' Fate, I-20, Chimere	Golden Grain
"N.S.E.W."	2002	Shawnna, I-20, Lil' Fate	Golden Grain
"Outro on Ya"	2002	I-20, Lil' Fate, Ludacris	Golden Grain
"Represent"	2003	Chingy, I-20	Jackpot
"We Got"	2003	Ludacris, I-20, Chingy	Chicken-n-Beer
"Eyebrows Down"	2003	Ludacris, Dolla Boy	Chicken-n-Beer
"Fightin' in the Club"	2004	I-20, Chingy, Lil Fate	Self Explanatory
"I Came to Bring the Pain"	2004	Lil' Flip, Static Major, Ludacris	U Gotta Feel Me
"Grew Up a Screw Up"	2006	Lil Wayne, Brisco	Lil Weezy Ana Vol. 1
"Keep It Hood"	2007	Lloyd Banks, Young Buck	—N/a
"We Got Dat"	2009	Gucci Mane, Chubbie Baby	Writing on the Wall
"Pussy Rehab"	2009	Gucci Mane	Writing on the Wall
"Gettin' to the Money"	2009	Gudda Gudda	Guddaville
"I Like It"	2009	Nicole Wray	Kill Cupid
"Realest They Come"	2009	Lil Wayne, Dre	Follow Me
"Leather Wood"	2010	Short Dawg, Gudda Gudda	Southern Flame Spitta 4
"NFL"	2010	Diamond	Cocaine Waitress
"All Out"	2010	Gorilla Zoe, Sonny Digital	Gorilla Zoe World
"Smell It on Me"	2010	Yukmouth, Gudda Gudda, D-Golder	Free at Last
"U Know What It Is"	2010	Young Buck, MJG	Back on My Buck Shit Vol. 2: Change of Plans
"All I Do Is Win" (Hood Remix)	2010	Young Cash, Yo Gotti, Gudda Gudda, Bun B, Ice Berg, T-Pain, Field Mob	Fed Bound
"Yeah Yeah" (Remix)	2011	Future	Dirty Sprite
"Money Mane"	2011	Project Pat, Ta Ta Licious, NastyMane	—N/a
"Big Man"	2011	T-Pain	Prevolver
"Swagger Jacker"	2011	Mistah F.A.B	The Grind Is a Terrible Thing to Waste, Pt. 2
"Deuces"	2011	Yung Joc	Ready to Fly
"Emotional"	2011	Cyhi the Prynce	Royal Flush II
"Bang!!!!"	2011	Lloyd, Salo	King of Hearts
"Y'all Ain't Got Nothin' on Me"	2011	Cory Gunz	Son of a Gun
"Pacman" (Remix)	2011	Pill, Rick Ross, Meek Mill, Gunplay	The Diagnosis
"Count It Up"	2011	Young Jeezy	CTE or Nothing
"Lost It"	2011	Gucci Mane, Future	Free Bricks
"Mud Muzik"	2011	Gucci Mane, Waka Flocka Flame	Ferrari Boyz
"On The Grind"	2011	T-Streets	The Streets Is Watching
"I'm On Worldstar"	2011	Drumma Boy, Gucci Mane, Young Buck	The Birth of D-Boy Fresh
"Levi Jeans"	2011	Drumma Boy, Rocko	The Birth of D-Boy Fresh
"Ima Stunt"	2011	Bow Wow, Lil Wayne, DJ Khaled	Greenlight 4
"Globetrotter"	2011	Wale	The Eleven One Eleven Theory
"Big R Go Home"	2011	Hype Pacino	HoodStar
"Stop"	2011	Kid Ink, Tyga	Wheels Up
"Like a Kid"	2011	Booghatti	—N/a
"Thank the Plug"	2011	Chubbie Baby, Jim Jones	36 Oz.
"Gettin 'Em"	2011	Sammie	—N/a
"Preach"	2011	Dorrough, Yo Gotti	Gangsta Grillz: Silent Assassin
"Problem"	2011	Lou Williams, Meek Mill	—N/a
"Neighborhood Hoez"	2011	Freddie Gibbs	Cold Day in Hell
"I Don't Care"	2011	2 Pistols	Mr. P
"I Ain't the One"	2011	Ludacris	1.21 Gigawatts: Back to the First Time
"Choose Up"	2011	Serius Jones, Sam Scarfo	Serius Bizness 2
"Perfect Symmetry"	2011	B.o.B	E.P.I.C. (Every Play Is Crucial)
"Oh Well" (Remix)	2011	Juicy J	Blue Dream & Lean
"Zip & a Double Cup" (Remix)	2011	Juicy J, Tha Joker	Blue Dream & Lean
"Bad Bitches" (Remix)	2011	Tyga, Gudda Gudda	#BitchImTheShit
"Ball"	2011	Waka Flocka Flame	Benjamin Flocka
"Luv Her"	2011	Ace Hood	The Statement 2
"Whip"	2011	French Montana	Coke Boys 2
"I'm wit it"	2011	Young Dolph	High Class Street Music 2: Hustler's Paradise
"Drop It"	2011	Bobby V, Meek Mill	Vitamin V
"Scared Money" (Remix)	2011	N.O.R.E., Slim The Mobster	—N/a
"Boo Thang" (Remix)	2011	Verse Simmonds, Yo Gotti	—N/a
"SupaFreak"	2011	Young Jeezy	TM:103 Hustlerz Ambition
"Fuck You Too"	2011	Planet VI, Jarren Benton	American Dream
"Country Ass Nigga"	2011	Nelly, T.I.	O.E.MO
"Shinin'"	2011	DJ Scream, Stuey Rock, Yo Gotti, Future, Gucci Mane	—N/a
"Too Cool" (Remix)	2011	King Louie, Red Café	—N/a
"Bait" (Remix)	2011	Wale, Rick Ross, Trey Songz	—N/a
"Kush & Drank"	2011	Zed Zilla	Rent's Due
"You Don't Know 'Bout It" (Remix)	2011	Travis Porter, Young Jeezy	—N/a
"Loud Mouth"	2012	T.I.	Fuck da City Up
"Fuck Em"	2012	Rick Ross, Wale	Rich Forever
"Party Heart"	2012	Rick Ross, Stalley	Rich Forever
"True Religion Shawty" (Remix)	2012	Philthy Rich	—N/a
"Cases"	2012	Yo Gotti	Live from the Kitchen
"Let It Go (Dope Boy)" (Remix)	2012	Red Café, Diddy, French Montana	Hell's Kitchen
"How You Love That"	2012	Red Café, Meek Mill	Hell's Kitchen
"Gettn 2 It"	2012	Jaiy Bradie	Show You How To Do This Pt. 1
"Get It Back"	2012	Gucci Mane	Trap Back
"Okay with Me"	2012	Gucci Mane	Trap Back
"Pussy"	2012	Don Trip	Guerrilla
"Em Down"	2012	8Ball, Yung Joc	Premro
"Make It Work"	2012	Young Fame	Welcome to the Social Club
"They Point"	2012	E-40, Juicy J	The Block Brochure: Welcome to the Soil 1
"#Grindmode"	2012	YG, Nipsey Hustle	4 Hunnid Degreez
"Mean Muggin'"	2012	Game, French Montana	California Republic
"Snitches Ain't" (Remix)	2012	YG, Snoop Dogg, Tyga, French Montana	—N/a
"Cocky" (Remix)	2012	DJ Paul	For I Have Sinned
"Count It"	2012	Jadakiss, Styles P	Consignment
"Whole Thang"	2012	2Win, Young Jeezy	Imagine
"Hello"	2012	Lloyd	—N/a
"Str8 Like That"	2012	Meek Mill, Louie V	Dreamchasers 2
"Big Money Talk"	2012	Lil Chuckee, Yo Gotti	Hood Guys
"I'm Up"	2012	Gucci Mane	I'm Up
"Pussy Real Good"	2012	Travis Porter	From Day 1
"Capitol"	2012	Currensy	The Stoned Immaculate
"Got Damn" (Remix)	2012	DJ Kay Slay, Torch, Gunplay, Busta Rhymes, French Montana	—N/a
"Drank in My Cup" (Remix)	2012	Kirko Bangz, Juelz Santana	—N/a
"Like That" (Remix)	2012	Papoose, Jadakiss, Styles P	The Last Year
"100"	2012	Bangladesh, Pusha T, Jadakiss	Flowers & Candy
"Honey I'm Home" (Noodles Mix)	2012	Akon	The Koncrete Mixtape
"Keep It Gee"	2012	Big Sean	—N/a
"No Go"	2012	TK n Cash	Orientation
"True Religion"	2012	OG Boo Dirty	Born A Soldier, Die A Vet
"Cooking All Morning"	2012	Jay Stonez	A1 Fishscale
"PayCation"	2012	Dolla Boy	2KHustle
"Molly"	2012	Jae Millz	The Appreciation Volume 4
"Boyfriend" (Remix)	2012	Justin Bieber, Asher Roth, Mac Miller	—N/a
"Sloppy" (Remix)	2012	Ray Jr., Big Sean, Ducky Smallz	—N/a
"Something on Your Mind"	2012	Allie Baby, Young Buck	Southern Smoke Radio Pt. 11
"Like Diz"	2012	Roscoe Dash	2.0
"Falling to Pieces"	2012	Jenna	—N/a
"Swagga to the Ceiling"	2012	I-20	Endless Pursuit
"Hungry in the Streets"	2012	I-20, Ludacris, Dolla Boy	Endless Pursuit
"Fuck You Too"	2012	Jarren Benton, Planet VI	Freebasing with Kevin Bacon
"Paycation"	2012	Dillon Saks	—N/a
"Cases"	2012	Yo Gotti	Est. in 1989 Pt. 2
"Got One"	2012	—N/a	Est. in 1989 Pt. 2
"Ex Amnesia"	2012	K'Jon	Moving On
"Got Damn" (Remix)	2012	Torch, Gunplay, Busta Rhymes	No A/C
"Do It Like Me"	2012	Drumma Boy	2K12 4th of July Playlist
"Oh Yeah"	2012	Chris Brown, Snoop Dogg	Fortune
"Don't Bring Me Down"	2012	8Ball	Life's Quest
"See Nann Nigga"	2012	Plies	On Trial
"Hood Rich Anthem"	2012	DJ Scream, Future, Waka Flocka Flame, Yo Gotti, Gucci Mane	Long Live the Hustle
"Outta Control"	2012	Jeremih, Gucci Mane	Late Nights with Jeremih
"I Don't See 'Em"	2012	DJ Khaled, Birdman, Ace Hood	Kiss the Ring
"Keep Calling My Phone"	2012	JT the Bigga Figga	—N/a
"All I Do"	2012	Chris Varsity	—N/a
"Rooster in My Rari" (Remix)	2012	Waka Flocka Flame, Gucci Mane	Salute Me or Shoot Me 4 (Banned from America)
"Retarded"	2012	Caddy da Don	Cut the Check
"The Morning"	2012	Pusha T, Common, Cyhi the Prynce, Kid Cudi, D'banj, Raekwon	Cruel Summer
"The One"	2012	Kanye West, Big Sean, Marsha Ambrosius	Cruel Summer
"Put It Down" (Remix)	2012	Brandy, Tyga	—N/a
"Make You Somebody"	2012	Sterling Simms, Tyga, Travis Porter	Mary & Molly
"911"	2012	Rick Ross	The Black Bar Mitzvah
"Freak Show"	2012	Meek Mill, Sam Sneak	Dreams & Nightmares
"So Gone"	2012	Young Buck	Strictly 4 Traps N Trunks 44: Free Young Buck Edition
"Charades"	2012	Chrisette Michele	Audrey Hepburn: An Audiovisual Presentation
"C'est la vie"	2012	Booba	Futur
"So Good"	2012	Yung Joc, Ebony Love	Bitch I'm Joc
"Plug"	2012	Chubbie Baby	36 Oz, Part 2
"She Weak"	2012	Yowda	Fresh Out Da Pot
"I'm Gudda"	2012	Gudda Gudda, T-Streets	Guddaville 3
"Bang Bang"	2012	Gudda Gudda	Guddaville 3
"Aww Naw"	2012	Cory Mo, Attitude, Bobby Marley	Country Rap Tunes 2
"Do You See Me"	2012	Cory Mo, KD	Country Rap Tunes 2
"It's Nothin'"	2012	Wiz Khalifa	O.N.I.F.C.
"Ali Bomaye"	2012	The Game, Rick Ross	Jesus Piece
"Real Live Pro"	2012	A-Mafia	Straight Savage
"Drug Lord"	2012	Red Café	American Psycho
"Get Me Doe"	2012	Wale	Folarin
"Own Drugs (O.D.)"	2012	Mike WiLL Made It, Juicy J, Cap1	Est. in 1989 2.5
"All Gold Everything" (Remix)	2013	Trinidad James, T.I., Young Jeezy	Don't Be S.A.F.E.
"2 of Everything"	2013	Boy Wonder, Reese	—N/a
"A-Town" (Remix)	2013	Cyhi the Prynce, B.o.B, Travis Porter	Ivy League: Kick Back
"Get Money"	2013	Matt Toka	—N/a
"Rubberband Money"	2013	A.R.S., Gillie da Kid	—N/a
"Sweetest Joy"	2013	Kevin McCall	Definition
"Dirty Cup"	2013	Gucci Mane	—N/a
"Mind Blown"	2013	Future, Waka Flocka Flame	First Class Flights
"Gangnam Style" (Diplo Remix)	2013	Psy, Tyga	Remix Style
"What Happened to Us"	2013	Veronica	—N/a
"Werk"	2013	Cap1, French Montana	T.R.U. 2 It
"I Want Sum"	2013	Cap1	T.R.U. 2 It
"Phantom"	2013	Bangladesh, Birdman	Ponzi Scheme
"Buy"	2013	Bangladesh, Tom Foolery, Pusha T, Fast Life	Ponzi Scheme
"News for You" (Remix)	2013	Eric Benet	—N/a
"Days and Days"	2013	Lil Wayne	I Am Not a Human Being II
"7 Minutes"	2013	DollaBillGates	Young Switch Lanes
"Fuego"	2013	Lunitik	—N/a
"My Songs Know What You Did in the Dark (Light Em Up)" (Remix)	2013	Fall Out Boy	—N/a
"Hijack"	2013	Tyga	Hotel California
"Ya'll Ain't"	2013	Funkmaster Flex, Cap1	Who You Mad At? Me or Yourself?
"Rattle (Sexy Ladies)" (Remix)	2013	Bingo Players	—N/a
"Chris Tucker"	2013	J. Cole	Truly Yours 2
"Use Me"	2013	Gucci Mane	Trap House III
"Get This Money"	2013	Young Dolph	High Class Street Music 3: Trappin' Out a Mansion
"Turnt"	2013	The-Dream, Beyoncé	IV Play
"Trap Doin Numbers"	2013	J. Money	The Medication
"Helicopter"	2013	Lil Scrappy, Twista	The Grustle
"Rotation"	2013	Wale, Wiz Khalifa	The Gifted
"Give It 2 U" (Remix)	2013	Robin Thicke, Kendrick Lamar	Blurred Lines
"Hulk Hogan"	2013	Young Cash	Win or Die
"No More"	2013	Gucci Mane	World War 3: Lean
"Hands Up"	2013	Swizz Beatz, Nicki Minaj, Rick Ross, Lil Wayne	—N/a
"Mula" (Remix)	2013	Big Sean, Meek Mill, Earlly Mac	Hall of Fame
"Having Sex"	2013	Juicy J, Trina	Stay Trippy
"Chicken Man" (Remix)	2013	Gillie Da Kid	Well Known
"Shotta Luv"	2013	Sean Kingston	Back 2 Life
"100K"	2013	Nelly	M.O.
"Living My Life"	2013	Mike Posner	—N/a
"Who I Am"	2013	Pusha T, Big Sean	My Name Is My Name
"Snapped"	2013	Cam'ron	Ghetto Heaven Vol. 1
"You Don't Want These Problems"	2013	DJ Khaled, Ace Hood, Meek Mill, French Montana, Rick Ross, Big Sean, Timbaland	Suffering from Success
"I Get the Girls"	2013	Larry Lynch, Sammie	—N/a
"So Hard"	2013	Cap.1, Verse Simmonds	Champagne Poets
"Benihana"	2013	Jeezy, Rocko	It's Tha World Vol. 2
"Strong" (Remix)	2013	Young Dro	—N/a
"Countdown"	2013	E-40	The Block Brochure: Welcome to the Soil 5
"More Than Likely"	2013	Mike WiLL Made-It, Cap.1	#MikeWillBeenTrill
"Lost Boyz"	2013	Troy Ave	White Christmas 2
"Grinding"	2013	Casanova Chris	—N/a
"Booty"	2014	Juvenile	—N/a
"Money Up"	2014	Emerson Windy	Herojuana
"They Know"	2014	Cap1, Rich Homie Quan	Caviar Dreams
"My City"	2014	N.O.R.E., Mack Maine, Bun B, Gunplay, Cityboy Dee	Resource Room
"Show Me" (Remix)	2014	Kid Ink, Juicy J, Chris Brown, Trey Songz	—N/a
"Bet I'm On It"	2014	Kevin Gates	By Any Means
"Familiar" (Remix)	2014	Ty Dolla Sign	—N/a
"Light Work"	2014	Creepyloc	—N/a
"Black"	2014	Six9	—N/a
"Right Now"	2014	August Alsina	—N/a
"Let's Get It On"	2014	Young Dolph	High Class Street Music 4: American Gangster
"You Already"	2014	Vado, Chinx, Ace Hood	—N/a
"Show Out"	2014	DJ Funky, Dropman, Lloyd	—N/a
"Anti Haters"	2014	Black Tha Don	Rookie of the Year
"Giuseppee"	2014	Mustard, Jeezy, Yo Gotti	10 Summers
"Rich Problems"	2014	Que	Can You Digg It?
"Turnt Up"	2014	Clinton Sparks, Riff Raff, Waka Flaka Flame	—N/a
"Get Out Here and Work"	2014	Cap.1, Skooly	Caviar Dreams 2
"Too Damn"	2014	Cap.1	Caviar Dreams 2
"Couple Niggas" (Remix)	2014	Chinx, French Montana	—N/a
"Snapped"	2014	Cam'ron	1st of the Month Vol. 4
"N.L.U."	2014	Keyshia Cole	Point of No Return
"Really"	2014	The Game, Yo Gotti, Soulja Boy, T.I.	Blood Moon: Year of the Wolf
"Dikembe"	2014	DJ Infamous, Young Jeezy	—N/a
"I'm That..."	2014	R. City	—N/a
"Living All Your Dreams"	2014	Mack Maine, Mac Miller	—N/a
"Double Tap"	2014	Jordin Sparks	ByeFelicia
"Awwsome" (Remix)	2014	Shy Glizzy, ASAP Rocky	LAW 3: Now or Never
"Someone To Love"	2014	Mike WiLL Made-It, Cap1, Skooly	Ransom
"Pull Up"	2014	Jay Kelly	—N/a
"Do What I Want"	2015	Lil Twist, K.R.	—N/a
"Preach"	2015	Lil Wayne	Sorry 4 the Wait 2
"Eskimo"	2015	Gucci Mane	Views from Zone 6
"Pulled Up"	2015	Young Dolph	High Class Street Music 5: The Plug Best Friend
"Go Get the Money"	2015	Young Dolph	High Class Street Music 5: The Plug Best Friend
"Febreze"	2015	Jack Ü	Skrillex and Diplo Present Jack Ü
"Get Away"	2015	DJ Self	Expanding My Business
"F.I.L.A. World"	2015	Raekwon	Fly International Luxurious Art
"Night Riders"	2015	Major Lazer, Travis Scott, Pusha T, Mad Cobra	Peace Is The Mission
"Full of Cash"	2015	Jaiy Bradie	FYC 2: I'm Done Playin Games
"Cruisin' (My '64)"	2015	Teflon, Cap.1	Liv
"Natural"	2015	Short Dawg	—N/a
"Valet"	2015	Eric Bellinger	Cuffing Season, Pt. 2
"High Today"	2015	Stoner, Gt Garza	—N/a
"Pot Life"	2015	Young Jeezy	Gangsta Party
"#NawSwear"	2015	Cap.1	—N/a
"Pipe It Up" (Remix)	2015	Migos, Young Jeezy	—N/a
"Thug City" (Remix)	2015	DJ Outta Space, K Camp, Quavo	—N/a
"Breathe"	2015	Cap.1	Trupac
"Tonite"	2015	Cap.1, Jeremih, Verse Simmonds	Trupac
"Why Wait"	2015	Cam'ron, Berner, Wiz Khalifa	Contraband
"Gas"	2015	Skooly	Blacc Jon Gotti
"This Me, Fuck It"	2015	Timbaland	King Stays King
"Shit Starters"	2015	Wiz Khalifa	Cabin Fever 3
"Baller Alert"	2016	Tyga, Rick Ross	Rawwest Nigga Alive
"Love Deez Hoes"	2016	Yo Gotti	The Art of Hustle
"Countin"	2016	Lil Uzi Vert, Wiz Khalifa	—N/a
"Might Be" (Remix)	2016	DJ Luke Nasty	—N/a
"Life Support"	2016	Young Scooter, Chophouze	80's Baby
"5 Minutes"	2016	K Camp	—N/a
"Ape"	2016	Rico Richie	R.S.E.T. 3: Back 2 the Streets
"Money Made Me Do It"	2016	Post Malone	August 26th
"IDKW2D"	2016	Mistah F.A.B.	Son of a Pimp, Pt 2
"Pocket Full of Money"	2016	DJ E-Feezy	—N/a
"Might Not" (Remix)	2016	Belly, Yo Gotti, The Weeknd	—N/a
"100it Racks"	2016	DJ Esco, Future, Drake	Project E.T. (Esco Terrestrial)
"Tell You That"	2016	Action Jackson	Tell You That - EP
"My Squad" (Remix)	2016	Problem	—N/a
"Da Man"	2016	D-Moe, D.D.M.S.	Expensive Murder
"Work for It"	2016	DJ Khaled, Big Sean, Gucci Mane	Major Key
"Where You At"	2016	Mally Mall, French Montana, Iamsu!	Mally's World, Vol. 1
"No Limit" (G-Mix)	2016	Usher, Master P, Travis Scott, Gucci Mane, ASAP Ferg	—N/a
"Whoodeeni"	2016	De La Soul	And the Anonymous Nobody...
"What Yo Life Like"	2016	Young Dolph	Rich Crack Baby
"Spend It" (Remix)	2016	Dae Dae, Lil Wayne	—N/a
"Key to the Streets" (Remix)	2016	YFN Lucci, Lil Wayne, Quavo	—N/a
"Can't Ignore"	2016	Dave East	Kairi Chanel
"Whip & A Chain"	2016	—N/a	The Birth of a Nation: The Inspired By Album
"In My House" (Remix)	2016	Verse Simmonds	—N/a
"Take Over Your Trap"	2016	Bankroll Fresh, Skooly	Bankroll Fresh
"Light It Up"	2016	Chocolate Droppa, Big Sean	Kevin Hart: What Now? (The Mixtape Presents Chocolate Droppa)
"Kap Ain't Nun" (Remix)	2016	Cool Amerika	—N/a
"H.A.T.E.R.S."	2016	D-Boy P. Chase, Rob G, J. Bell	Paintings on a Digital Canvas
"Thick"	2016	O.T. Genasis	Coke N Butter
"OTW" (Remix)	2016	DJ Luke Nasty	—N/a
"Tru" (Remix)	2016	Lloyd	Tru - EP
"Yacht Master"	2016	Murda Beatz, Swae Lee	Keep God First
"Shake It For Me"	2016	Austin Mahone	For Me + You
"Pound"	2016	Curren$y	Andretti 12/30
"Deadz"	2017	Migos	Culture
"Crime"	2017	Mr. 2-17	Street Light
"Sacrifices"	2017	Drake, Young Thug	More Life
"Y'all Ain't Ready"	2017	Mike WiLL Made-It	Ransom 2
"Wassup Wid It"	2017	DJ Holiday	—N/a
"Swish"	2017	Kid Ink	7 Series
"Kush"	2017	Organized Noise, Joi	Organized Noise
"Both Eyes Closed"	2017	Gucci Mane, Young Dolph	Droptopwop
"Whatever"	2017	DJ Khaled, Future, Young Thug, Rick Ross	Grateful
"Members Only"	2017	Chi City	—N/a
"That's It"	2017	Bebe Rexha, Gucci Mane	All Your Fault: Pt. 2
"Wild One"	2017	DJ Kay Slay, Rick Ross, Kevin Gates, Meet Sims	The Big Brother
"Rope a Dope"	2017	Victor Oladipo	Songs for You
"Iced Out"	2017	Lil Pump	Lil Pump
"Cloud 9"	2017	JR, Zydelo	—N/a
"Anomaly"	2017	Dame D.O.L.L.A	CONFIRMED
"Ultimate Gangsta"	2017	Giggs	Wamp 2 Dem
"Go Get Sum Mo"	2017	Young Dolph, Gucci Mane, Ty Dolla Sign	Thinking Out Loud
"Ashanti" (Remix)	2017	Yung Trel	—N/a
"Swagger"	2017	Skooly	BAcCWArdFeELiNgS
"Trick Me"	2017	Cyhi the Prynce	No Dope on Sundays
"gucci linen"	2017	blackbear	Cybersex
"Big Bidness"	2017	Big Sean, Metro Boomin	Double Or Nothing
"Man of the Hour"	2017	Statik Selektah, Wiz Khalifa	8
"Top Off"	2018	Pacman, Juicy J	—N/a
"Chloraseptic" (Remix)	2018	Eminem, Phresher	—N/a
"2nd to None"	2018	Dreezy	—N/a
"Love N Hennessy" (Remix)	2018	A. Chal, Nicky Jam	—N/a
"Habit"	2018	Skooly	Don't You Ever Forget Me 2
"Flirt"	2018	PRhyme	PRhyme 2
"Too Playa"	2018	Migos	Culture II
"How I Feel"	2018	Good Gas, ASAP Ferg, FKi 1st	Good Gas, Vol. 1
"Oops"	2018	Lil Yachty, K$upreme	Lil Boat 2
"State of Emergency"	2018	Logic	Bobby Tarantino II
"Hardaway" (Remix)	2018	Derez De'Shon, DJ Envy, Yo Gotti	—N/a
"Tick Tock"	2018	Lil Xan	Total Xanarchy
"Bali" (Remix)	2018	88Glam, Nav	88Glam Reloaded
"Olha a Explosão" (Remix)	2018	Kevinho, French Montana, Nacho	—N/a
"Wake Up & Cook Up"	2018	Zaytoven, Quavo	Trapholizay
"Black Power. White Powder"	2018	Killer Mike	Rapture (Music from the Netflix Original TV Series)
"Light Flex"	2018	Tone Stith	The Uncle Drew Motion Picture Soundtrack
"Plug Walk" (Remix)	2018	Rich The Kid, Gucci Mane, YG	—N/a
"Out the Gate"	2018	TK Kravitz	2.0
"SOJU"	2018	Jay Park	Ask Bout Me
"Traphandz"	2018	Bun B, Yo Gotti	Return of the Trill
"DucK my Ex"	2018	Tory Lanez, Chris Brown	Love Me Now?
"Stunt"	2018	Swizz Beatz	Poison
"I Know"	2018	OSBS	No Cap
"How Dat Sound"	2018	Trey Songz, Yo Gotti	28
"Tables"	2018	Too Short, Snoop Dogg	The Pimp Tape
"Anyway"	2018	Lil Baby, Gucci Mane	Street Gossip
"7 rings" (Remix)	2019	Ariana Grande	—N/a
"Stripper Name"	2019	Lil Pump, YG	Harverd Dropout
"Ice Me Out" (Remix)	2019	Kash Doll	—N/a
"Pull Up" (Remix)	2019	Lil Duval, Ty Dolla $ign	—N/a
"Servin Js"	2019	Sleepy Rose	Tellnya
"Know You Know"	2020	Lil Wayne	Funeral
"Angel's Getting Pedicured"	2020	Jadakiss	Ignatius
"Uh Huh"	2020	Trouble	Thug Luv
"Box Chevy"	2020	Skooly	Nobody Likes Me
"Out of Sight"	2020	Run the Jewels	RTJ4
"Bocky"	2020	Sleepy Rose, Ola Runt	Ethereal Hell Edition
"Fuck the World (Summer in London)" [Remix]	2020	Brent Faiyaz	—N/a
"Siri"	2020	Lil Wayne	Tha Carter V Deluxe Edition
"Can't Relate"	2020	Big Papito	Sessions 01
"Burn"	2020	Big Papito, Trouble	Sessions 01
"Popular Demand"	2020	Big Papito, Skooly	Sessions 01
"Go Crazy"	2020	Megan Thee Stallion, Big Sean	Good News
"Spend It"	2020	Juicy J, Lil Baby	The Hustle Continues
"Big Homie"	2020	Symba	Don't Run From R.A.P.
"Hit Different"	2020	Lil Wayne	No Ceilings 3 [B-Side]
"Plug Talk"	2021	Benny the Butcher, Harry Fraud	The Plugs I Met 2
"Dope Talk"	2021	Bankroll Freddie, Young Scooter	Big Bank
"200 Pies"	2021	Conway the Machine	La Maquina
"Posed To Be"	2021	Sleepy Rose, Mike WiLL Made-It	Gully (Original Motion Picture Soundtrack)
"Top of Shit"	2021	Gucci Mane, Young Dolph	Ice Daddy
"Forest Lawn"	2021	Westside Gunn, Armani Caesar	Hitler Wears Hermes 8: Side B
"Sellin' Cereal"	2021	Curren$y, Harry Fraud	Regatta
"Thought I Was Gonna Stop" (Remix)	2021	Papoose, Remy Ma, Busta Rhymes, Lil Wayne	December
"Fall Apart"	2022	Ralo, T.I.	Political Prisoner
"My Queen"	2022	Bun B, Cory Mo, CeeLo Green	Mo Trill
"Can't Believe It"	2022	Kid Cudi	Entergalactic
"Givin' Up (Not the One)"	2023	Don Toliver, 21 Savage	Spider-Man: Across the Spider-Verse (Soundtrack from & Inspired by the Motion Picture)
"Kyrie and Luka"	2024	Eminem	The Death of Slim Shady
"Big Dog"	2026	Prof & That Mexican OT	Bad Time Boy

== Music videos ==
=== As lead artist ===
List of music videos, with directors, showing year released
Title	Year	Director(s)
"Boo" (featuring Yo Gotti)	2011	Jordan Tower
"Spend It"	2011	Alex Nazari
"Pimps" (featuring Bun B and Big K.R.I.T.)	2011	Artemus Jenkins
"Spend It" (Remix) (featuring T.I.)	2012	G Visuals
"Got One"	2012	Vitamin E
"One Day at a Time" (featuring Jadakiss)	2012	Jim Jones
"Riot"	2012	Decatur Dan
"Stunt" (featuring Meek Mill)	2012	Alex Nazari
"Undastatement"	2012	Decatur Dan
"Murder" (featuring Kreayshawn)	2012	Alex Nazari
"Turn Up" (featuring Cap1)	2012	Decatur Dan
"No Lie" (featuring Drake)	2012	Director X
"I Luv Dem Strippers" (featuring Nicki Minaj)	2012	Benny Boom
"Birthday Song" (featuring Kanye West)	2012	Andreas Nilsson
"I'm Different"	2012	Elisha Smith
"Crack"	2013	Aristotle
"Yuck!" (featuring Lil Wayne)	2013	Alex Nazari
"Like Me"	2013	Sharod Marcus Simpson
"Feds Watching" (featuring Pharrell)	2013	Ryan Hope
"Where U Been?" (featuring Cap1)	2013	Sharod Marcus Simpson
"Used 2"	2013	Marc Klasfeld
"Fork"	2013	Parris Stewart
"U Da Realest"	2013	Sharod Marcus Simpson
"Mainstream Ratchet"	2014	Sharod Marcus Simpson
"Trap Back"	2014	Alex Nazari
"They Know" (featuring Ty Dolla $ign and Cap1)	2014	Alex Nazari
"Flexin On My Baby Mama"	2014	Alex Nazari
"Freebase"	2014	Alex Nazari
"Road Dawg"	2015	Chad Tennies
"Trap House Stalkin"	2015	Orbit Didit and Vick Suero
"Neighborhood"	2015	The Stupid Geniuses
"If I Didn't Rap"	2015	Sharod Marcus Simpson
"Lapdance In The Trap House"	2015	Sharod Marcus Simpson
"Everything I Know"	2015	Sharod Marcus Simpson
"A Milli Billi Trilli" (featuring Wiz Khalifa)	2015	Mike Marasco
"BFF (Remix)" (featuring Jeezy)	2015	The Stupid Geniuses
"El Chapo Jr."	2015	The Stupid Geniuses
"Watch Out"	2016	Motion Family
"Bounce" (featuring Lil Wayne)	2016	We Hard Productions
"100 Joints"	2016	We Hard Productions
"Gotta Lotta" (featuring Lil Wayne)	2016	We Hard Productions
"MFN Right (Remix)" (featuring Lil Wayne)	2016	Howard Ross
"Ounces Back"	2016	Howard Ross
"Countin"	2016	Howard Ross
"Diamonds Talkin Back"	2016	Howard Ross
"Lil Baby" (featuring Ty Dolla $ign)	2016	Howard Ross
"Good Drink" (featuring Gucci Mane and Quavo)	2017	Howard Ross
"It's A Vibe" (featuring Ty Dolla $ign, Trey Songz and Jhene Aiko)	2017	Howard Ross and Darren Miller
"Blue Cheese" (featuring Migos)	2017	Daps
"Sleep When U Die"	2017	Joe Moore
"Trap Check"	2017	Howard Ross
"Door Swangin"	2017	Howard Ross
"4 AM" (featuring Travis Scott)	2017	Ben Newman
"Proud" (featuring YG and Offset)	2018	2 Chainz and Howard Ross
"Bigger Than You" (featuring Drake and Quavo)	2018	Nathan R. Smith
"Girl's Best Friend" (featuring Ty Dolla $ign)	2018	Sebastian Sdaigui
"Hot Wings"	2019	Howard Ross
"Expensify This"	2019	Andreas Nilsson
"Money In the Way"	2019	Vincent Lou°
"Rule the World" (featuring Ariana Grande)	2019	Sebastian Sdaigui
"2 Dollar Bill" (featuring Lil Wayne and E-40)	2019	Andreas Nilsson
"Dead Man Walking" (featuring Future)	2020	Kid Art
"NO TV"	2020	Cloud Harvest Creations
"Money Maker" (featuring Lil Wayne)	2020	Bryan Barber
"Quarantine Thick" (featuring Latto)	2020	Bryan Barber
"Can't Go For That" (featuring Ty Dolla $ign and Lil Duval)	2020	Howard Ross and Sam Green
"Lambo Wrist"	2020	Bryan Barber
"Toni"	2020	Bryan Barber
"Southside Hov"	2020	Howard Ross
"Grey Area"	2021	2 Chainz and Motion Family
"Million Dollars Worth of Game"	2022	Bryan Barber
"Pop Music" (featuring Moneybagg Yo and Beatking)	2022	Keemotion
"Neighbors Know My Name"	2022	2 Chainz
"Free B.G."	2022	Terrius Mykel
"Kingpen Ghostwriter" (featuring Lil Baby)	2022	Howard Ross

== See also ==
- Playaz Circle discography
