= Freebase =

Freebase may refer to:

- Free base or freebase, the pure basic form of an amine, as opposed to its salt form
- Freebase (database), a former online database service
- Freebase (mixtape), 2014 mixtape by 2 Chainz
- An original song by the Mike Flowers Pops on their 1996 LP "A Groovy Place"
- FreeBASE (climbing), free solo climbing with a BASE jumping parachute rig

== See also ==
- Freebass, a musical supergroup
- Free-bass accordion, a bellows instrument
