= Big Amount =

Single by 2 Chainz featuring Drake

from the album Daniel Son; Necklace Don
- Released: September 23, 2016
- Recorded: 2016
- Genre: Hip hop
- Length: 3:11
- Label: Def Jam
- Songwriter(s): Tauheed Epps; Aubrey Graham; Tyron Douglas
- Producer(s): Buddah Bless

2 Chainz singles chronology
"Champions" (2016)	"Big Amount" (2016)	"Castro" (2016)

Drake singles chronology
"Too Good" (2016)	"Big Amount" (2016)	"Fake Love" (2016)

"Big Amount" is a hip hop song by American rapper 2 Chainz. It was released as the first single from his mixtape Daniel Son; Necklace Don. The song features vocals from Canadian rapper Drake, and was produced by Buddah Bless. It is also included as a bonus track as the eighth track on digital versions of Pretty Girls Like Trap Music.

== Charts ==
Chart (2016)	Peak position
US Bubbling Under Hot 100 Singles (Billboard)	9
US Hot R&B/Hip-Hop Songs (Billboard)	44

== Certifications ==
Region	Certification	Certified units/sales
United States (RIAA)	Platinum	1,000,000^{‡}
^{‡} Sales+streaming figures based on certification alone.
