= Rapture (TV series) =

- Genre: Documentary
- Starring: A Boogie Wit Da Hoodie; Logic; 2 Chainz
- Country of origin: United States
- Original language: English (Note: With some dialogue in Brazilian Portuguese and Spanish on G-Eazy’s episode.)
- No. of seasons: 1
- No. of episodes: 8

Production
- Running time: 52-63 min.
- Production companies: Brazil Production Services; Mass Appeal

Original release
- Network: Netflix
- Release: April 2, 2018

Rapture is a 2018 American docu-series starring A Boogie Wit Da Hoodie, Logic and 2 Chainz, exploring artists' lives with their families and friends, in the studio and going on tour and putting on shows.

== Premise ==
Rapture follows Hip-hop artists like A Boogie Wit Da Hoodie, Logic and 2 Chainz privately, in the studio and doing shows. Each episode of the series focuses on one of the rappers, and the series is directed by six different directors.

== Cast ==
- A Boogie Wit Da Hoodie
- Logic
- 2 Chainz
- Aloe Blacc
- Just Blaze
- Dave East
- G-Eazy
- Dominique Kelley
- Killer Mike
- Lin-Manuel Miranda
- N.O.R.E.
- Nas
- Large Professor
- Rapsody
- Cherie Robinson
- T.I.

== Release ==
It was released on April 2, 2018, on Netflix streaming.
