= Daniel Son; Necklace Don =

Mixtape by 2 Chainz
- Released: August 5, 2016
- Recorded: 2016
- Genre: Hip-hop; trap
- Length: 31:34
- Label: Self-released
- Producer: 2 Chainz; Buddah Bless; Bobby Kritical; C4; DJ Spinz; Dun Deal; K Swisha; Mr. 2-17; Southside; TM88

2 Chainz chronology
ColleGrove (2016)	Daniel Son; Necklace Don (2016)	Hibachi for Lunch (2016)

Singles from Daniel Son; Necklace Don
- 1. "Big Amount" Released: September 23, 2016

Daniel Son; Necklace Don is the ninth mixtape by American rapper 2 Chainz. It was released on August 5, 2016, independently by 2 Chainz. The project consists of ten tracks, with guest appearances from Drake and YFN Lucci, with production from TM88, C4, Dun Deal, DJ Spinz, Bobby Kritical, K Swisha, Mr. 2–17, Southside, and Buddah Bless. Artwork was illustrated by Kid Graphic. Originally the seventh track on the tape, "Big Amount" was removed from the tracklist and included as a digital bonus track on his fourth studio album, Pretty Girls Like Trap Music.

== Critical reception ==
Professional ratings
Review scores
Source	Rating
HipHopDX	2.9/5
Pitchfork	7.7/10
XXL	3/5 stars

Daniel Son; Necklace Don received generally favorable reviews, with XXL giving the mixtape three out of five stars.

== Track listing ==
Daniel Son; Necklace Don track listing
No.	Title	Writer(s)	Producer(s)	Length
1.	"Intro"	Tauheed Epps	2 Chainz	0:39
2.	"Get Out the Bed"	Epps; Bryan Simmons	TM88	2:54
3.	"Ghetto"	Epps; Nosakhere Andrews	Mr. 2-17	3:24
4.	"Ounces Back"	Epps; Gary Hill; Joshua Luellen	DJ Spinz; Southside	2:47
5.	"Chirp"	Epps; Karl Hamnqvist	K Swisha	3:52
6.	"Kilo"	Epps; Hill	DJ Spinz	3:23
7.	"Big Amount" (featuring Drake)	Epps; Tyron Douglas; Aubrey Graham	Buddah Bless	3:11
8.	"You In Luv Wit Her" (featuring YFN Lucci)	Epps; Bobby Turner; Rayshawn Bennett	Bobby Kritical	3:57
9.	"Blessing"	Epps; Hill	DJ Spinz	3:59
10.	"1 Yeezy Boot"	Epps; Rodrequez Yancy; David Cunningham	C4; Dun Deal	3:26
Total length:				31:34

Notes

- "Big Amount" contains interpolations from "Take Over Your Trap" by Bankroll Fresh featuring Skooly and 2 Chainz.
