= It's a Vibe =

Single by 2 Chainz featuring Ty Dolla Sign, Trey Songz and Jhené Aiko

from the album Pretty Girls Like Trap Music
- Released: March 14, 2017
- Recorded: 2016
- Genre: Hip hop; R&B; trap
- Length: 3:30
- Label: Def Jam
- Songwriters: Tauheed Epps; Shane Lindstrom; Robert Mandell; Tyrone Griffin, Jr.; Tremaine Neverson; Jhené Chilombo
- Producers: Murda Beatz; G Koop

2 Chainz singles chronology
"Good Drank" (2017)	"It's a Vibe" (2017)	"Gang Up" (2017)

Ty Dolla Sign singles chronology
"Swalla" (2017)	"It's a Vibe" (2017)	"H.O.E. (Heaven On Earth)" (2017)

Trey Songz singles chronology
"Playboy" (2017)	"It's a Vibe" (2017)	"Animal" (2017)

Jhené Aiko singles chronology
"First Fuck" (2017)	"It's a Vibe" (2017)	"While We're Young" (2017)

"It's a Vibe" is a song by American rapper 2 Chainz, featuring American singers Ty Dolla Sign, Trey Songz, and Jhené Aiko. Produced by Murda Beatz and G Koop, it was released on March 14, 2017, as the second single from the former's fourth studio album Pretty Girls Like Trap Music.

== Music video ==
A music video was released on April 20, 2017, on 2 Chainz's Vevo account on YouTube. The video features everyone in different sections of a private club relaxing.

== Commercial performance ==
"It's a Vibe" debuted at number 95 on the US Billboard Hot 100 for the week of July 1, 2017. It has peaked at number 44, spending 20 weeks on the chart.

== Charts ==
=== Weekly charts ===
Chart (2017)	Peak position
Canada (Canadian Hot 100)	81
US Billboard Hot 100	44
US Hot R&B/Hip-Hop Songs (Billboard)	20
US Rhythmic Airplay (Billboard)	19

=== Year-end charts ===
Chart (2017)	Position
US Hot R&B/Hip-Hop Songs (Billboard)	53

== Certifications ==
Region	Certification	Certified units/sales
Brazil (Pro-Música Brasil)	Gold	30,000^{‡}
Canada (Music Canada)	3× Platinum	240,000^{‡}
New Zealand (RMNZ)	3× Platinum	90,000^{‡}
United Kingdom (BPI)	Silver	200,000^{‡}
United States (RIAA)	5× Platinum	5,000,000^{‡}
^{‡} Sales+streaming figures based on certification alone.

== Release history ==
Region	Date	Format	Version	Label	Ref.
United States	May 30, 2017	Rhythmic contemporary radio	Original	Def Jam	
United States	May 31, 2017	Rhythmic contemporary radio	Original / Explicit	Def Jam	
