= Hibachi for Lunch =

EP by 2 Chainz
- Released: October 28, 2016
- Recorded: 2016
- Genres: Hip-hop; trap
- Length: 22:00
- Label: Self-released
- Producers: Buddah Bless; Bugzy Mouges; DJ Paul; FKi 1st; Foreign Teck; K Swisha; Mike Dean; Mike Will Made It; Mondo; Supah Mario; TWhy Xclusive

2 Chainz chronology
Daniel Son; Necklace Don (2016)	Hibachi for Lunch (2016)	Pretty Girls Like Trap Music (2017)

Hibachi for Lunch is the third extended play (EP) by American rapper 2 Chainz. It was self-released on October 28, 2016. The project consists of seven tracks, with guest appearances from Quavo, Ty Dolla Sign, Gucci Mane and Future, and production from Buddah Bless, DJ Paul, FKi 1st, Foreign Teck, K Swisha, Mike Dean, Mike Will Made It, Mondo, Supah Mario and TWhy Xclusive.

Originally the third track on the tape, "Good Drank" was removed from the tracklist and released January 20, 2017, as the lead single from his fourth studio album, Pretty Girls Like Trap Music.

== Critical reception ==
Professional ratings
Review scores
Source	Rating
HipHopDX	3.8/10
XXL	3/5

HipHopDX praised the EP, highlighting 2 Chainz's wordplay and technical ability and writing, "[2 Chainz] has morphed into one of the strongest wordsmiths in the game." Scott Glaysher of XXL wrote, "2 Chainz delivers exactly what we want from him -- head-turning lines, solid beats and an aligned mixtape theme -- but the tape is missing that wow factor. [...] The new music is satisfying but by the same token, leaves listeners wanting more."

== Track listing ==
Hibachi for Lunch track listing
No.	Title	Writer(s)	Producer(s)	Length
1.	"Countin"	Tauheed Epps; Armond Kendrick; Tyron Douglas	Mondo; Buddah Bless	2:42
2.	"Diamonds Talkin Back"	Epps; Jonathan Priester	Supah Mario	3:03
3.	"Good Drank" (featuring Quavo and Gucci Mane)	Epps; Michael Dean; Quavious Marshall; Radric Davis	Dean	3:44
4.	"Lil Baby" (featuring Ty Dolla Sign)	Epps; Michael Hernandez; Casey Manheim; Trocon Roberts Jr.; Tyrone Griffin Jr.	Foreign Teck; FKi 1st; Bugzy Mouges	3:19
5.	"Day Party"	Epps; Karl Hamnqvist	K Swisha	2:21
6.	"Doors Open" (featuring Future)	Epps; Tim Moore; Paul Beauregard; Nayvadius Wilburn	DJ Paul; TWhy Xclusive	4:14
7.	"Here We Go Again"	Epps; Michael Williams II	Mike Will Made It	3:01
Total length:				22:00
