= Good Drank =

Single by 2 Chainz featuring Quavo and Gucci Mane

from the album Pretty Girls Like Trap Music
- Released: January 20, 2017
- Recorded: 2016
- Genre: Trap-soul
- Length: 3:45
- Label: Def Jam
- Songwriters: Tauheed Epps; Radric Delantic Davis; Quavious Marshall; Michael George Dean
- Producer: Mike Dean

2 Chainz singles chronology
"Throw Myself a Party" (2016)	"Good Drank" (2017)	"It's a Vibe" (2017)

Gucci Mane singles chronology
"Party" (2016)	"Good Drank" (2017)	"Both" (2017)

Quavo singles chronology
"Castro" (2016)	"Good Drank" (2017)	"Congratulations" (2017)

"Good Drank" is a song by American rapper 2 Chainz, featuring Quavo and Gucci Mane, and was originally released on October 19, 2016 as a promotional single from his mixtape, Hibachi for Lunch; although it was later removed from the tracklist and released on January 20, 2017 as the lead single from his fourth studio album Pretty Girls Like Trap Music. This track was produced by Mike Dean.

== Music video ==
A music video was released on January 19, 2017 on 2 Chainz's Vevo account on YouTube. The video features everyone dressed in vintage clothing, referencing The Prohibition Era, transporting purple drank instead of alcohol.

== Commercial performance ==
"Good Drank" debuted at number 92 on the US Billboard Hot 100 for the week of February 11, 2017. It later peaked at number 70, spending 16 weeks on the charts.

== Charts ==
=== Weekly charts ===
Chart (2017)	Peak position
US Billboard Hot 100	70
US Hot R&B/Hip-Hop Songs (Billboard)	32

=== Year-end charts ===
Chart (2017)	Position
US Hot R&B/Hip-Hop Songs (Billboard)	73

== Certifications ==
Region	Certification	Certified units/sales
United States (RIAA)	2× Platinum	2,000,000^{‡}
^{‡} Sales+streaming figures based on certification alone.

== Release history ==
Region	Date	Format	Label	Ref.
United States	February 21, 2017	Rhythmic contemporary radio	Def Jam	
