= Iakopo =

iakopo
- Also known as: Rein Free, Keys of Creation, Kopo
- Born: 30 Dec
- Genres: Reggae, hip hop
- Occupation: Musician
- Instrument: Vocal
- Labels: Universal Music Japan, Sony Music Japan, LionzShare, Island Empire, Sony Music
- Website: Instagram Twitter; YouTube iakopoMusic; YouTube iakopoDaily SoundCloud

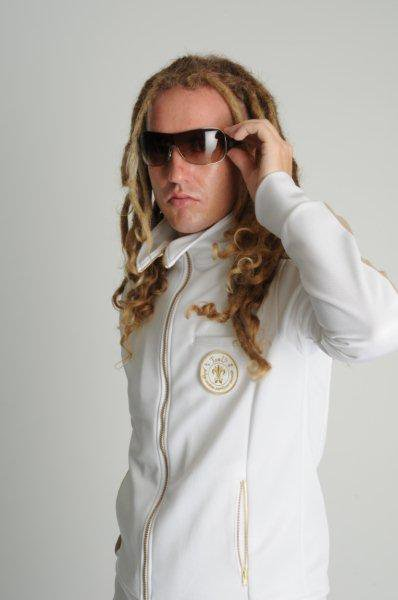
Iakopo 2011

Iakopo (born 30 December) (pronunciation: yah-koh-po) is an international recording artist. Until 2010, he performed as "Keys of Creation" before starting his career as a solo artist and officially recording and performing music under the name iakopo.

== Life and career ==
=== Early life ===
The second of six children born into a strict Mormon family, iakopo's journey started in Fountain Valley, California. During his formative years, iakopo was sent to the all boys facility, Paradise Cove Academy in Western Samoa. With such a diverse beginning, iakopo begin to flourish greatly in Samoa, ultimately being adopted by a Samoan family. As he adapted to island life, iakopo discovered a passion for nature and singing. While attending Pesega Church College in Western Samoa, iakopo sang with a local reggae band, covering Top 40 music.

iakopo said about this time: Samoan culture taught me a lot about life and respect. It also helped nurture my vibe.

=== 2000–2005: Growing as an artist ===
After graduating high school in 2000, iakopo left Samoa and returned to the US. As he brought his passion for music with him, iakopo started making demos, as well as selling mixtapes on the streets of cities across America. This led to him gaining credibility in the underground grassroots community under the name "Rein Free". In 2004 he self-released an album called Realization under that name. The underground success of this album led to his first record deal offer in 2005. He refused that deal, choosing instead to rename himself Keys of Creation and release a new album called Let Your Light Shine.

=== 2006–2010: Keys of Creation – Let Your Light Shine and Born To Win ===
Let Your Light Shine was influenced by artists such as Bob Marley. It was released by iakopo independently on 12 December 2006. The singles "Let Your Light Shine" and "Love Jah" made it to the top of reggae charts in the US, Hawaii, Polynesia, Asia and Europe. This success led to a record deal with 1980Entertainment, as well as iakopo sharing the stage with many influential reggae artists. After an independent tour throughout Hawaii and West Coast America in 2007, he co-headlined the Summer Massive Tour in 2008, alongside Tribal Seeds. He also was the opening act for Half Pint's 2008 concert in World Beat Center, San Diego, CA. In 2009 he toured as support for Israel Vibrations, Junior Reid, Midnite, Collie Buddz and Messenga Selah.

While touring, he wrote the album Born To Win. On this, iakopo focused on his island roots, as can be heard on the single "Heart of Polynesia". This single was another No. 1 hit on Hawaiian radio stations, as well as winning the International Music Video Award for World Music 2008. A dispute led to iakopo splitting with his label and deciding to start writing music under his own name.

=== 2011 – 2014: iakopo – 808 Maui, Singles and One Forever ===
iakopo moved to Japan in 2010, after meeting his new manager in Maui, Hawaii. His manager put him in contact with Universal Music Japan, who signed him for the compilation CD 808 Maui. It contains four of iakopo's songs, including the single "By My Side" whose ‘Fallen’ riddim was produced by Citizen K and made it to the top of reggae charts in the UK. iakopo also released another song with Citizen K called "Be with me" on the 'Blindfold' riddim on 20 November 2011. The riddim is still a top featured one on fiweh as of 2 April 2012. Universal also arranged a collaboration between iakopo and Infinity 16, which resulted in the single "Bounce", released 28 September 2011. The single sold 7,000 units on the release day, was the No. 1 sold single in Japan for 2 weeks and No. 1 on the Japanese mobile download charts.

iakopo started his own label LionzShare.

On 12 December 2011 iakopo released his first single on LionzShare called 'FLY'. It was the No. 1 featured single on reggaezion for the whole first month after its release. This was followed on 2 February 2012 by 'VIP'.

His released the single "Remedy" on 26 March 2012. It was produced by Citizen K and has backing vocals by Fiona. The single was featured on a number of blogs and is iakopo's first single with an official video. 'Remedy' reached #2 on Betelnutradio.com. iakopo has also been featured and interviewed on LionsFace Radio from Amsterdam.

His follow-up single "Hot Summer" was released 18 June 2012. Written by iakopo and produced by Soren 'Cash' Petersen at the LionzShare Studio. As of 30 August 2012, it was featured on the Pacific Top 20 for 4 weeks in a row and reached No. 5.

Between 2013 and 2014, iakopo focused solely on music and introducing his style to the world. In 2013, iakopo launched his annual event "Island Fever" which brings a mix of Reggae and Environmentalism to Tokyo. After the success of "Island Fever", iakopo toured Hawaii in the summer of 2013. Following his return to Japan, singles "I Believe" and "When I See You Smile" (ft Kalisi) were released. By 2014, iakopo returned solidly to the studio to prepare for his fourth album. Releasing chart topping singles such as "One Forever", "Whatcha Say" and "Tonite". To date the videos for "Tonite" and "One Forever" (which is also the title track) have garnered over 2 million views on YouTube and growing. In October 2014, iakopo officially released the One Forever album.

=== 2015 - present ===
In early 2015, iakopo took a trip to Jamaicaon a musical exploration. As a fan and artist of Reggae Music, iakopo engaged himself within the culture and music present in Jamaica.

Teaming up with Gramps Morgan of Morgan Heritage, iakopo released the single "Supernatural". iakopo remains in Jamaica, partnering with Stylez of Blaze Ent Records alongside some of Jamaica's top producers, and working on his album The Introduction.

iakopo teamed up with Rvssian, the famous Jamaican dancehall producer, and created a hit song titled Touch Down featuring Shaggy. the song entered the U.S. Billboard dance charts top 100 debut at 41 and was the fastest bullet to #31 on the U.S. Billboard Dance Charts.

== Discography ==
Song or Album
Title	Year	Type
Let Your Light Shine	2006	Album
Love Jah	2006	Single
Born To Win	2009	Album
Heart of Polynesia	2009	Single
By My Side	2010	Single
Bounce	2011	Single
Flying In Love	2011	Single
Living In Harmony	2011	Single
Rhythm of Love	2011	Single
Baby Girl	2011	Single
FLY	2011	Single
WINE SLOW	2012	Single
Tokyo Party	2012	Single
VIP	2012	Single
Remedy	2012	Single
Hot Summer	2012	Single
Break Free (feat. Lukie D)	2012	Single
Love Like This	2012	Single
When I See You Smile (feat. Kalisi)	2013	Single
I Believe	2013	Single
Lion Stylee	2013	Single
Another Rainbow (Pop Radio Edit)	2013	Single
Good Love	2014	Single
Let It Go	2014	Single
One Forever	2014	Album
Supernatural	2015	Single
Touch Down (Feat. Shaggy)	2015	Single
The World Must Change (Feat. Jah Cure)	2016	Single
Free up the herb	2016	Single
Chant	2016	Single
In the Back	2018	Single
My Revolution	2018	Single
Never Letting Go	2019	Single
Sometimes	2019	Single
Brown Eyed Girl	2019	Single
Stay (feat. JOEY DJIA)	2019	Single
How We Do It	2019	Single
Late Night Call	2019	Single
Merry Like Christmas	2019	Single
Waves	2019	Album
Blue Skies	2020	Single
Switch Up	2020	Single
Rockaway	2020	Single
Diploma	2020	Single
Sugar Plum	2020	Single
Deja Vu	2020	Single
Closer to You (Feat. Sean Paul)	2020	Single
Fade Away (With. OZworld a.k.a. R'kuma, Wil Make-it)	2020	Single
What I Need	2020	Single
Back Forth (With. Joe Iron)	2020	Single
Alone	2020	Single

Single

Album <One Forever>
NO.	Song
1	Intro with Tokyonesians
2	Break Free feat. Lukie D
3	Whatcha Say
4	One Forever
5	I Believe
6	When I See You Smile (feat. Kalisi)
7	Love Like This
8	Time Of Our Life
9	Let It GO
10	Here For You
11	Tonite
12	Chasing Rainbows
13	Miracle
14	Outro with Tokyonesians
15	Bombonai (feat. Los Cativos)

Album <Waves>
NO.	Song
1	Easy
2	Right Now (feat. Moi)
3	In the Back
4	The Wave
5	Never Letting Go (feat. Yaccahmoe)
6	On (feat. Bo Napoleon)
7	WWYD (What Would You Do)
8	My Revolution
9	Warrior (No Worry Girl)
10	Don't Mash Up the Vibe
11	So Nice
12	Legends

Featuring song
Artist	Song	Year
Peacemeka	Ride With Us (feat. iakopo)	2012
Eric Gray	Life & You (feat. iakopo)	2019
Francesco DeMeo	This Way (feat. iakopo)	2019

Songs in compilation album
Song	Compilation Album	Year
MY EVERYTHING	Some Love 愛の唄	2010
Rhythm of Love	808 MAUI	2011
Living in harmony	808 MAUI	2011
By My Side	808 MAUI	2011
Baby Girl	808 MAUI	2011
BOUNCE	ずっと君と...	2011
My Everything	Some Love Riddim -23Productions	2012
When I See You Smile (feat. Kalisi)	HAWAIIAN CAFÉ 2	2017
My Love (feat. Lia Caribe)	Nigel Angus Presents Dane Ray Danza	2018
My Revolution [Explicit]	Kingmaker: The Chronicles	2019
Find My Way [Explicit]	Kingmaker: The Chronicles	2019
King	Quarantine	2020
I Love Your Body	Quarantine	2020

== Awards ==
- International Music Video Awards Best World Music Video 'Heart of Polynesia’
- Billboard Top 40 Dance 'Touch Down'
