= Pretty Girls Like Trap Music =

Studio album by 2 Chainz
- Released: June 16, 2017
- Studios: Deuce Station; EarDrummer; Street Execs; Upstairs (Atlanta); Fisticuffs Gym (Culver City); Henson; Holly Park (Los Angeles); The Hideout (Las Vegas); Hit Factory Criteria (Miami); Jungle City (New York City)
- Genres: Hip-hop; trap
- Length: 61:50
- Labels: The Real University; Def Jam
- Producers: Buddah Bless; Cubeatz; Ducko McFli; FKi 1st; FKi; G Koop; Honorable C.N.O.T.E.; K Swisha; M16; Mike Dean; Mike Will Made It; Murda Beatz; Pharrell Williams

2 Chainz chronology
Hibachi for Lunch (2016)	Pretty Girls Like Trap Music (2017)	The Play Don't Care Who Makes It (2018)

Singles from Pretty Girls Like Trap Music
- 1. "Good Drank" Released: January 20, 2017; 2. "It's a Vibe" Released: March 9, 2017; 3. "4 AM" Released: September 19, 2017

Pretty Girls Like Trap Music (stylized as Pretty Girls 👍🏿 TRΛP MUSIC) is the fourth studio album by American rapper 2 Chainz. It was released on June 16, 2017, through The Real University and Def Jam Recordings, as the follow-up to ColleGrove, his 2016 collaborative effort with Lil Wayne. The production on the album was handled by FKi, Honorable C.N.O.T.E., Mike Dean, Mike Will Made It, and Murda Beatz, among others. The album also features guest appearances from several urban artists; Gucci Mane, Quavo, Travis Scott, Nicki Minaj, Swae Lee, Drake, Ty Dolla Sign, Trey Songz, Jhené Aiko, Pharrell, and Monica.

Pretty Girls Like Trap Music was supported by three singles: "Good Drank", "It's a Vibe", and "4 AM". The album was also supported by a nationwide concert tour, as well as several pop-up shops in the US. 2 Chainz alluded to the album showing "growth and maturation". He stated the content would maintain its edginess while also elevating trap music to a point where everyone can appreciate it. The album received widespread acclaim, with most critics citing the album as his best album yet. It debuted at number two on the US Billboard 200, earning 106,000 album-equivalent units in its first week.

== Background ==
2 Chainz embarked on his music career under the moniker Tity Boi, alongside Dolla Boy, in the hip-hop group Playaz Circle. The group was signed to fellow Georgia-based rapper Ludacris' Disturbing tha Peace (DTP) label imprint. Playaz Circle went on to release two albums under the label, with their debut spawning the hit single "Duffle Bag Boy". In 2007, 2 Chainz began to release solo material, later securing a solo recording contract with Def Jam Recordings in 2012. Following his record deal, Def Jam issued 2 Chainz's solo major-label debut Based on a T.R.U. Story, in August. Def Jam went on to release his follow-up albums B.O.A.T.S. II: Me Time (2013) and ColleGrove (2016).

On January 2, 2017, at an Atlanta Hawks press conference, 2 Chainz revealed his fourth album would be titled Pretty Girls Like Trap Music. In May 2017, 2 Chainz appeared on The View, where he said fans should expect "growth and maturation" on the album. He continued, saying "It's still edgy content, but trap music is kinda defined as low socioeconomic background music where you have to hustle to get out. And it's a situation where a lot of good girls used to like the bad guys, and that's what this album is about". In an interview with Rolling Stone, 2 Chainz said the album title came from "beautiful girls who like this hustler—who you think would be attracted to a whole other type of music. But they like Migos, Future. You get with this girl, and you want to play Bryson Tiller. But she's like, 'I want to hear Gucci'".

== Recording and production ==
We're the pop stars. Trap rap is pop now. People's ears have adjusted to what we have to say and how we say it.

— 2 Chainz in a June 2017 interview with Rolling Stone.

On June 1, 2017, 2 Chainz was interviewed by the LA Leakers where the conversation turned to the album's creative direction, and 2 Chainz spoke on the tracklist and production. "I didn't force any features. When you hear the track it sounds like its supposed to be those voices on the track". He also spoke on Pharrell Williams' contribution to the project, saying that Williams was one of the album's final collaborators: "He's a great producer, so I think he brought to the table what he felt was missing from the project." The final result is what 2 Chainz calls "top tier yacht music". In an interview with Rolling Stone, 2 Chainz said he continued the art of memorizing all his rhymes before recording for this album: "I don't like writing down anything. I feel like I could waste a good idea on just listening to a track. I don't want to hear 15 beats. I don't want to waste my studio time listening to beats. When I come, I want to work. Load them up. I'm going to come off the top. And out of the three [beats chosen by a producer], I hope one of them is something I can keep or keep going off of."

== Release and promotion ==
In August 2016, 2 Chainz released the mixtape, Daniel Son; Necklace Don, which includes the single, "Big Amount" featuring a guest appearance from Canadian rapper Drake, while the production was handled by Buddah Bless. "Big Amount" was officially released on September 23, 2016, and reached number 44 on the US Hot R&B/Hip-Hop Songs. In October 2016, 2 Chainz released the EP Hibachi for Lunch, which contains the song, "Good Drank". The song would later be released for purchase and go on to serve as a digital exclusive track for the album.

In February 2017, in anticipation for the album, 2 Chainz partnered with Spotify for an ongoing series of playlists with the same title. During the time, 2 Chainz collaborated with Karrueche Tran, Erykah Badu and Cardi B to offer listeners "the best in new trap music". The playlist also includes personal favorites of each "pretty girl" who helped curate. On March 10, Spotify released the updated playlist, which was assisted by his frequent collaborator Nicki Minaj. Making the list were 2 Chainz's two newest tracks, "It's a Vibe" and "Smartphone". Minaj also contributed her three new releases "No Frauds", "Changed It", and "Regret in Your Tears". Songs from Gucci Mane, Bankroll Fresh and Future also appeared on the list.

The album's initial release date was April 7, 2017, however on March 29, it was revealed the album had been pushed back. On May 23, 2017, 2 Chainz released a trailer in promotion for the album. On May 25, 2017, 2 Chainz unveiled the album cover, crediting graffiti artist Trouble Andrew, for the cover art. On May 30, the album was made available for pre-order on the iTunes Store. Along with the pre-order, 2 Chainz revealed the album's track-listing and released a new song, "4 AM" featuring a guest appearance from Houston-based rapper Travis Scott, while the production was handled by Murda Beatz and Cubeatz.

In June 2017, 2 Chainz announced he would be partnering up with Trouble Andrew (who designed the album cover), to release a collaborative apparel collection themed after the album. The collaboration between 2 Chainz and Trouble Andrew was released exclusively in New York City with a special pop-up shop located on 54 Green Street. 2 Chainz also launched a digital pop-up shop starting June 8 through June 16, where each day a new piece of apparel was sold for that particular day only. On June 6, 2017, 2 Chainz revealed he would be headlining a national concert tour in support of the album.

On June 18, 2017, 2 Chainz opened up a pop-up "Trap Salon", in promotion for Pretty Girls Like Trap Music. The salon was open to the public where fans got their nails done for free in support of the album. The local nail salon was entirely decorated in pink decor with black spray painted lettering, coinciding with the album title and theme. Each nail set design was named after a track from 2 Chainz's album, including "Good Drank", "Big Amount", "Blue Cheese", "4 AM" and "Burglar Bars".

On June 19, 2 Chainz released the music video for "Blue Cheese" featuring Atlanta-based hip hop trio Migos. The video, directed by The Daps, was described by The Fader as featuring the rappers "in front of what appears to be a trapped-out housing complex. A large, cross-shaped platform in the courtyard hosts the four rappers, as well as a cadre of beautiful women, as they dance and stunt in couture over the course of the song's three verses". On June 20, 2 Chainz released the video for "Sleep When U Die", which was directed by Joe Moore. The music video for "Trap Check", which was filmed in black and white and directed by Howard Ross, followed on June 23.

=== Singles ===
The album's lead single, "Good Drank", was produced by Houston-based producer Mike Dean, and features guest appearances from hip hop artists Quavo and Gucci Mane. The music video for "Good Drank", directed by Howard Ross, was released on January 19, 2017. "Good Drank" was made available for purchase on January 20. On February 28, 2017, the three of them performed the song on The Tonight Show Starring Jimmy Fallon. An alternate version of the song was later released on March 6, "Good Drank 2.0" featuring vocals from a line of backup singers known as the Trap Choir. "Good Drank" went on to reach number 70 on the US Billboard Hot 100.

The album's second single, "It's a Vibe" features guest appearances from American R&B singers Ty Dolla Sign, Trey Songz and Jhené Aiko, with production coming from Murda Beatz and G Koop. The song was officially released on March 9, 2017. The music video for "It's a Vibe", was released on April 20, in celebration of cannabis culture. "It's a Vibe" went on to reach number 44 on the Billboard Hot 100.

On May 30, 2017, 2 Chainz released a promotional single, "4 AM". The song features a guest appearance from Houston-based rapper Travis Scott, while the production was handled by Murda Beatz and Cubeatz. It was later sent to urban radio on September 19, 2017, as the album's third single.

== Critical reception ==
Professional ratings
Aggregate scores
Source	Rating
AnyDecentMusic?	7.2/10
Metacritic	82/100
Review scores
Source	Rating
AllMusic	4/5 stars
The A.V. Club	B
Clash	7/10
Exclaim!	8/10
HipHopDX	4.1/5
HotNewHipHop	88%
Pitchfork	8.0/10
PopMatters	8/10
XXL	4/5

Pretty Girls Like Trap Music was met with widespread critical acclaim. At Metacritic, which assigns a normalized rating out of 100 to reviews from professional publications, the album received an average score of 82, based on 10 reviews. Aggregator AnyDecentMusic? gave it 7.2 out of 10, based on their assessment of the critical consensus.

Andy Kellman of AllMusic stated that "Inconspicuousness notwithstanding, Pretty Girls Like Trap Music is among Epps' most significant and enjoyable work". Paul A. Thompson of Pitchfork wrote: "Pretty Girls Like Trap Music's penultimate song, the one before Farrakhan, is a Pharrell duet that sounds as if it was parachuted in from another, much softer album, one you'll hear in a fast casual restaurant seven years from now, just like the penultimate song from The Blueprint 3. 2 Chainz is exactly the same age today that Jay-Z was in 2009. But where Jay was running out of steam, 2 Chainz sounds like he's finally hitting his stride. If not royalty, then the next best thing." Calum Slingerland of Exclaim! said, "If Pretty Girls Like Trap Music doesn't make the rapper an immediate king of the South, it undoubtedly puts him in line for the title".

In his review, Grant Rindner of PopMatters states, "His talent has undeniably caught up to his hard work, and all we can hope now is that the latter doesn't suffer because of the former". Will Lavin, an author for Clash, said, "While it doesn't quite have the same urgency as Based on a T.R.U. Story or T.R.U. REALigion, Pretty Girls Like Trap Music is perfectly positioned to be a 2017 favourite catering to both fans of this generation's trap music and those that were knee deep in trap during its late '90s/early '00s inception". HipHopDX, Trent Clark concluded, "Despite the lack of range, Pretty Girls Like Trap Music goes down as 2 Chainz' strongest LP to date and will become a reference point for anyone curious about how the towering rap star can service their turn-up needs".

=== Accolades ===
Year-end lists for Pretty Girls Like Trap Music
Publication	Accolade	Rank	Ref.
Clash	Clash Albums of the Year 2017	42	
Complex	The Best Albums of 2017	25	
HipHopDX	HipHopDX's Best Rap Albums of 2017	12	
Noisey	The 100 Best Albums of 2017	84	

== Commercial performance ==
Pretty Girls Like Trap Music debuted at number two on the US Billboard 200 chart, earning 106,000 album-equivalent units, (including 57,000 copies as pure album sales) in its first week. This became 2 Chainz' fourth US top-ten debut. In its second week, the album dropped to number five on the chart, earning an additional 43,000 units. In its third week, the album dropped to number six on the chart, earning 33,000 more units. In its fourth week, the album dropped to number 12 on the chart, earning 27,000 units. As of January 2018, the album has earned 648,000 album-equivalent units and has sold 130,000 copies in the US. On February 8, 2019, the album was certified platinum by the Recording Industry Association of America (RIAA) for combined sales and album-equivalent units of over one million units in the United States.

== Track listing ==
Pretty Girls Like Trap Music track listing
No.	Title	Writer(s)	Producer(s)	Length
1.	"Saturday Night"	Tauheed Epps; Michael Williams II; Charles Singleton; Aaron Jackson	Mike Will Made It; Ducko McFli	4:31
2.	"Riverdale Rd"	Epps; Emmanuel Nickerson; Michael Dean	Mano; Mike Dean	3:24
3.	"Good Drank" (featuring Gucci Mane and Quavo)	Epps; Radric Davis; Quavious Marshall; Dean	Dean	3:45
4.	"4 AM" (featuring Travis Scott)	Epps; Jacques Webster II; Kevin Gomringer; Tim Gomringer; Shane Lindstrom	Murda Beatz; Cubeatz	4:15
5.	"Door Swangin"	Epps; Tyron Douglas	Buddah Bless	3:08
6.	"Realize" (featuring Nicki Minaj)	Epps; Onika Maraj; Trocon Roberts, Jr.	FKi 1st	3:51
7.	"Poor Fool" (featuring Swae Lee)	Epps; Khalif Brown; Williams II; Singleton; Dean; Chloe Won	Mike Will Made It; Ducko McFli; Dean^{[b]}	3:41
8.	"Big Amount" (featuring Drake) (bonus track)	Epps; Aubrey Graham; Douglas; Marshall Sudderth	Buddah Bless	3:11
9.	"It's a Vibe" (featuring Ty Dolla Sign, Trey Songz and Jhené Aiko)	Epps; Tyrone Griffin, Jr.; Tremaine Neverson; Jhené Chilombo; Lindstrom; Robert Mandell	Murda Beatz; G Koop	3:30
10.	"Rolls Royce Bitch"	Epps; Calvin Frazier; Carlton Mays, Jr.	Honorable C.N.O.T.E.	3:59
11.	"Sleep When U Die"	Epps; Douglas	Buddah Bless	3:14
12.	"Trap Check"	Epps; Douglas; Jay Jenkins; Marquinarius Holmes; Clifford Harris, Jr.; Demetrius Stewart	Buddah Bless	3:06
13.	"Blue Cheese" (featuring Migos)	Epps; Marshall; Kiari Cephus; Kirshnik Ball; Karl Hamnqvist	K Swisha	5:08
14.	"OG Kush Diet"	Epps; Roberts, Jr.; Steven Bolden; Dwayne Shippy	FKi; iLL Wayno^{[a]}	4:10
15.	"Bailan" (featuring Pharrell) (bonus track)	Epps; Pharrell Williams	Williams	3:50
16.	"Burglar Bars" (featuring Monica)	Epps; Monica Brown; Dean; Salomes Jackson; Gabriel Arillo; Bennie Amey; Joshua Banks; Barbara English; George Kerr	M16; Dean^{[a]}	5:07
Total length:				61:50

Track notes

- ^{^[a]} signifies a co-producer
- ^{^[b]} signifies an additional producer
- The bonus tracks "Big Amount" and "Bailan" are not included in the CD/LP version.

Sample credits

- "Trap Check" contains a sample of "Get Ya Mind Right", as performed by Jeezy and written by Jay Jenkins and Demetrius Stewart, from the album Let's Get It: Thug Motivation 101; and a sample of "ASAP", as performed by T.I. and written by Clifford Harris Jr. and Marquinarius Holmes, from the album Urban Legend.
- "Burglar Bars" contains an interpolation of "You're Gonna Need Somebody to Love You", written by Barbara J. English and George Kerr.

== Personnel ==
Credits adapted from 2 Chainz's official website.

Vocalists

- 2 Chainz – primary artist
- Gucci Mane – featured artist (track 3)
- Quavo – featured artist (track 3)
- Travis Scott – featured artist (track 4)
- Nicki Minaj – featured artist (track 6)
- Swae Lee – featured artist (track 7)
- Drake – featured artist (track 8)
- Ty Dolla Sign – featured artist (track 9)
- Trey Songz – featured artist (track 9)
- Jhené Aiko – featured artist (track 9)
- Migos – featured artist (track 13)
- Pharrell – featured artist (track 15)
- Monica – featured artist (track 16)
- Special K – additional vocals (tracks 4, 13, 14)
- Louis Farrakhan – spoken word (track 15)

Musicians

- Aaron Jackson – guitar (track 1), piano (track 1)
- Chloe Flower – piano (track 7)
- Tubbyoung – bass guitar (track 10)
- Los Hendrix – guitar (track 10)
- Uri Horton – bass guitar (track 16)
- Loyd Watson Jr. – saxophone (track 16)

Technical

- KY – mixer (all tracks)
- Nolan Presley – engineer (all tracks)
- Mike Dean – mixer (tracks 3, 7)
- Zach Steele – engineer (track 4)
- Big Juice – engineer (track 6)
- Nick Valentin – assistant engineer (track 6)
- Jess Jackson – mixer (track 7)
- Jak – engineer (tracks 7, 11)
- Randy Lanphear – engineer (track 7)
- Brian Warfield – engineer (track 9)
- DJ Durel – engineer (track 13)
- Tony Maserati – mixer (track 15)
- Miles Comaskey – assistant mixer (track 15)
- Andrew Coleman – engineer (track 15)
- Mike Larson – engineer (track 15)
- Zack Pancoast – assistant engineer (track 15)
- Thomas Cullison – assistant engineer (track 15)
- Mike Stankiewicz – assistant engineer (track 15)
- KingMixx – engineer (track 16)

Production

- Mike Will Made It – production (tracks 1, 7)
- Ducko McFli – production (tracks 1, 7)
- Mano – production (track 2)
- Mike Dean – production (tracks 2, 3, 7, 16)
- Murda Beatz – production (tracks 4, 9)
- Cubeatz – production (track 4)
- Buddah Bless – production (tracks 5, 8, 11, 12)
- FKi 1st – production (track 6)
- G Koop – production (track 9)
- Honorable C.N.O.T.E. – production (track 10)
- K Swisha – production (track 13)
- FKi – production (track 14)
- iLL Wayno – production (track 14)
- Pharrell Williams – production (track 15)
- M16 – production (track 16)

== Charts ==
=== Weekly charts ===
Chart performance for Pretty Girls Like Trap Music
Chart (2017)	Peak position
Australian Albums (ARIA)	52
Belgian Albums (Ultratop Flanders)	139
Belgian Albums (Ultratop Wallonia)	152
Canadian Albums (Billboard)	7
Dutch Albums (Album Top 100)	55
French Albums (SNEP)	120
New Zealand Heatseekers Albums (RMNZ)	2
Slovak Albums (ČNS IFPI)	55
UK Albums (Official Charts)	88
US Billboard 200	2
US Top R&B/Hip-Hop Albums (Billboard)	1

=== Year-end charts ===
2017 year-end chart performance for Pretty Girls Like Trap Music
Chart (2017)	Position
US Billboard 200	53
US Top R&B/Hip-Hop Albums (Billboard)	23

2018 year-end chart performance for Pretty Girls Like Trap Music
Chart (2018)	Position
US Billboard 200	191

== Certifications ==
Certifications for Pretty Girls Like Trap Music
Region	Certification	Certified units/sales
Canada (Music Canada)	Gold	40,000^{‡}
New Zealand (RMNZ)	Gold	7,500^{‡}
United States (RIAA)	Platinum	1,000,000^{‡}
^{‡} Sales+streaming figures based on certification alone.
