= 4 AM (2 Chainz song) =

2017 single by 2 Chainz featuring Travis Scott

Single by 2 Chainz featuring Travis Scott

from the album Pretty Girls Like Trap Music
- Released: September 19, 2017
- Genre: Hip hop; trap
- Length: 4:15
- Label: Def Jam
- Songwriters: Tauheed Epps; Jacques Webster II; Shane Lindstrom; Kevin Gomringer; Tim Gomringer
- Producers: Murda Beatz; Cubeatz

2 Chainz singles chronology
"Gang Up" (2017)	"4 AM" (2017)	"2nd to None" (2018)

Travis Scott singles chronology
"Sky Walker" (2017)	"4 AM" (2017)	"Deserve" (2017)

Music video
- "4 AM ft. Travis Scott" on YouTube

"4 AM" is a song by American rapper 2 Chainz featuring fellow American rapper Travis Scott. It was released on September 19, 2017, as the third single from the former's fourth studio album, Pretty Girls Like Trap Music (2017). It was sent to urban contemporary radio as a single on September 19, 2017, but originally was released on May 30, as a promotional single. The song was written alongside producers Murda Beatz and Cubeatz.

== Composition ==
Max Weinstein of XXL wrote that the song had a "mellow vibe" to it, while Winston Cook-Wilson of Spin called it a "detuned, mid-tempo jam." 2 Chainz reminisces throwing himself a surprise birthday party and listening to Lil Wayne's album Tha Carter.

== Music video ==
The music video was released on November 17, 2017. In it, 2 Chainz and Travis Scott throw a wild party with women, a couple of them topless, around them, with drinking and smoking marijuana involved.

== Personnel ==
Credits adapted from 2 Chainz's official website.

- Tauheed Epps – composer, lyricist
- Jacques Webster II – composer, lyricist
- Shane Lindstrom – composer, lyricist
- Kevin Gomringer – composer, lyricist
- Tim Gomringer – composer, lyricist
- Special K – additional vocals
- KY – mixer
- Nolan Presley – engineer
- Zach Steele – engineer
- Murda Beatz – production
- Cubeatz – production

== Charts ==
Chart (2017)	Peak position
Canada (Canadian Hot 100)	50
US Billboard Hot 100	55
US Hot R&B/Hip-Hop Songs (Billboard)	24
US Rhythmic Airplay (Billboard)	36

== Certifications ==
Region	Certification	Certified units/sales
New Zealand (RMNZ)	Gold	15,000^{‡}
United States (RIAA)	2× Platinum	2,000,000^{‡}
^{‡} Sales+streaming figures based on certification alone.
