= 2 Chainz =

American rapper and actor (born 1977)

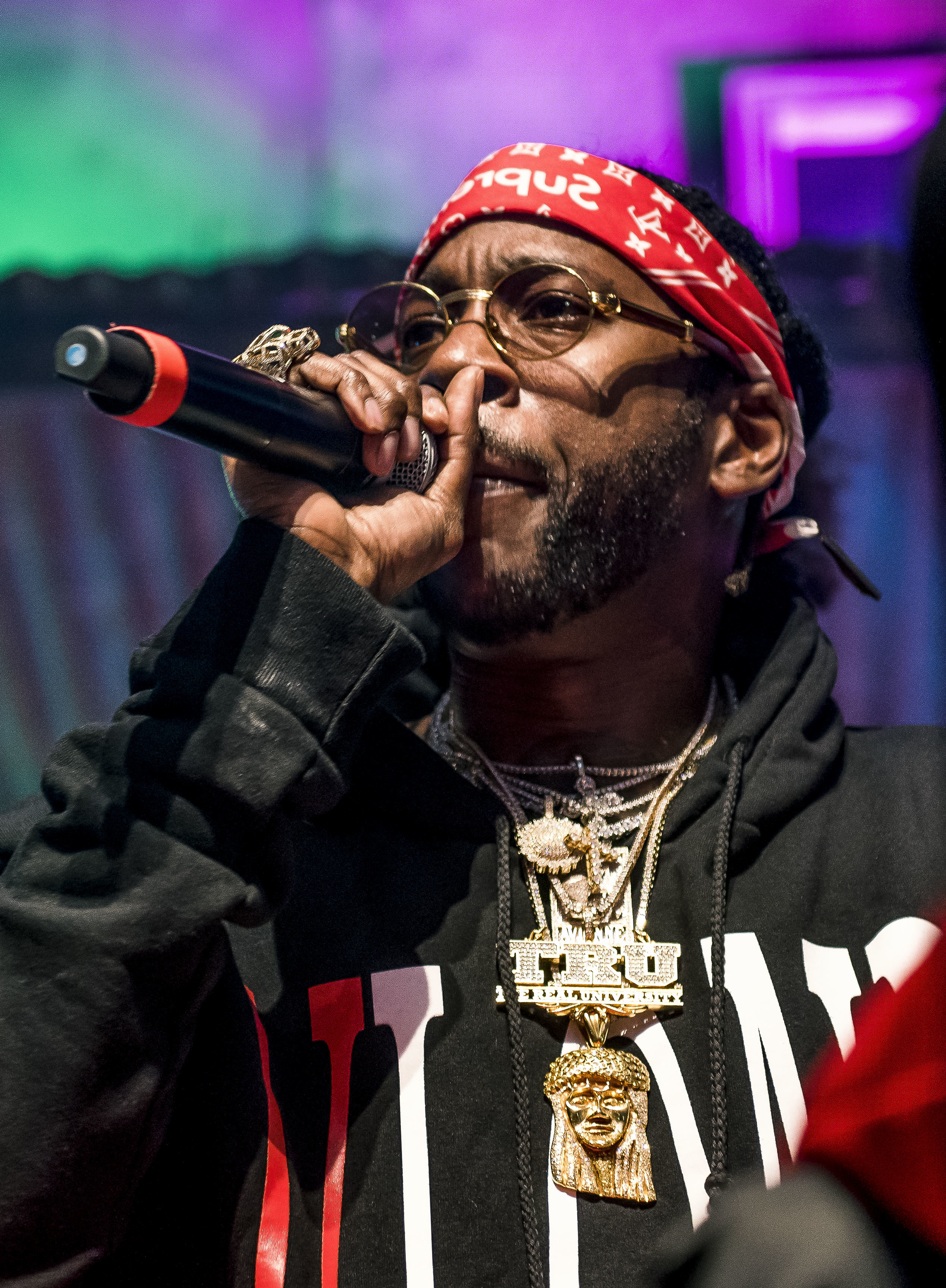
- 2 Chainz in 2017
- Born: Tauheed Epps; September 12, 1977 (age 49); College Park, Georgia, U.S.
- Other names: Tity Boi; Drenchgod
- Education: Virginia State University (BS)
- Occupations: Rapper; songwriter; actor
- Years active: 1997–present
- Spouse: Kesha Ward (m. 2018)
- Children: 3
- Awards: Full list
- Musical career
- Genres: Southern hip-hop; trap
- Instrument: Vocals
- Works: 2 Chainz discography
- Labels: Gamebread; T.R.U.; Empire; Def Jam (former); Disturbing Tha Peace
- Formerly of: Playaz Circle; DTP
- Website: 2chainz.com

Tauheed Epps (born September 12, 1977), known professionally as 2 Chainz, is an American rapper, songwriter, and actor. Born and raised in College Park, Georgia, he gained recognition as one-half of the Southern hip-hop duo Playaz Circle, alongside hometown rapper Earl "Dolla Boy" Conyers. The duo signed with fellow Georgia-based rapper Ludacris' Disturbing tha Peace label and became best known for their 2007 debut single "Duffle Bag Boy" (featuring Lil Wayne).

In February 2012, Epps signed a solo recording contract with Def Jam Recordings, a subsidiary of Universal Music Group. In April of that year, his guest performance on Kanye West's single, "Mercy" marked his first entry on the Billboard Hot 100 as a solo act, peaking at number 13. His debut studio album, Based on a T.R.U. Story (2012), was preceded by the double platinum-certified singles "No Lie" (featuring Drake) and "Birthday Song" (featuring Kanye West), peaked atop the Billboard 200, and spawned the top 40 single "I'm Different", although critical reception was mixed. His second album, B.O.A.T.S. II: Me Time (2013), was led by the single "Feds Watching" (featuring Pharrell Williams) and saw improved critical reception despite a slight commercial decline. His subsequent albums— ColleGrove (2016), Pretty Girls Like Trap Music (2017), Rap or Go to the League (2019), So Help Me God! (2020), and Dope Don't Sell Itself (2022)—were released to moderate commercial success. After the release of his collaborative album with Lil Wayne, Welcome 2 Collegrove (2023), he parted ways with Def Jam in 2024.

Epps has won a Grammy Award from six nominations; his guest appearance on Chance the Rapper's 2016 single "No Problem" won Best Rap Performance. His other accolades include three BET Awards from 11 nominations, and five BET Hip Hop Awards from 19 nominations. He has also hosted Vice TV's 2017 reality series Most Expensivest, in which he reviews luxury consumer goods; it aired for four seasons.

== Early life ==
2 Chainz was born Tauheed Epps in College Park, Georgia. He attended North Clayton High School, where he played basketball and graduated second in his class. While in high school, he dealt marijuana and was arrested for felony cocaine possession when he was 15 years old.

== College basketball career ==
Tauheed K. Epps
Personal information
- Listed height: 6 ft 5 in (1.96 m)

Career information
- High school: North Clayton (College Park, Georgia)
- College: Alabama State (1995–1997)
- Position: Forward
- Number: 23

He later attended Alabama State University on a scholarship and played on its basketball team from 1996 to 1997. His jersey number was 23.

Rolling Stone asked 2 Chainz about longstanding rumors, widely reported by many sources, in addition to Wikipedia, that he had graduated from Alabama State with a 4.0 GPA. He replied, "Don't believe anything on Wack-ipedia. There's a lot of false stuff on there, to the point that every time I try to fix one thing, something else comes out." In fact, he transferred to Virginia State University due to circumstances he was reluctant to speak about. "I got into some trouble, went somewhere else, and came back. But I graduated, and that's that. That was then," he said.

=== Statistics ===
Statistics
Season	FGM	FGA	FG%	FTM	FTA	FT%	PPG	RPG
1995–96	9	25	.360	7	13	.538	2.4	0.2
1996–97	27	61	.443	12	31	.387	3.0	2.2

== Musical career ==
=== 1997–2010: Playaz Circle and Disturbing tha Peace ===
Epps formed the hip-hop duo Playaz Circle (the word "Playaz" having been made into a backronym for "Preparing Legal Assets for Years from A to Z") in College Park, Georgia, in 1997, with his high school friend Earl Conyers (known as Dolla Boy), while Epps adopted "Tity Boi" as his moniker. Following the release of an independent album titled United We Stand, United We Fall (2002), the duo was introduced to fellow Atlanta rapper Ludacris when he moved into their College Park apartment complex while he was acting as a DJ. After taking interest in Playaz Circle, Ludacris began to record several songs with the group, playing some of them on his radio station.

Ludacris soon became one of the highest-selling rappers in the Southern United States. After hearing of their situation, Ludacris requested from Epps that the duo join his newly formed record label, Disturbing Tha Peace, a subsidiary of Def Jam Recordings. Epps agreed to sign, although Conyers did not officially join the label until his mother regained her health a year after the initial signing.

The duo released their debut album, Supply & Demand, on October 30, 2007. Their lead single and debut track, "Duffle Bag Boy", became an urban hit. Featuring Lil Wayne, they performed the song at the BET Hip Hop Awards. The duo released their second studio album, Flight 360: The Takeoff, on September 29, 2009. In January 2010, Playaz Circle filmed a music video for the single "Big Dawg" featuring Lil Wayne and Birdman, at Studio Space Atlanta. Shortly afterwards, Epps left Disturbing tha Peace to advance his career. Although Ludacris was initially reluctant, feeling Epps could still be financially successful, he eventually accepted the decision.

=== 2011–2012: Name change and Based on a T.R.U. Story ===
Epps faced allegations of sexism for his original pseudonym, "Tity Boi", although he has repeatedly denied such accusations. In early 2011, he decided to change his stage name to "2 Chainz", which he described as more "family-friendly". Regarding the name change, he further explained to Vibe magazine: "The name Tity Boi actually came from my big mama, from me being spoiled and an only child—breastfed. My mama called me Tity Boi, my dad called me Tity Man, my hood called me Tit so when we was trying to rap I had been going by Tit my whole life, Tit, Tity, Tity Man—it's just like a country nickname—term for being an only child." Following the name change, Epps released a mixtape titled T.R.U. REALigion, which became his first mixtape to appear on the music charts, peaking at number 58 on the US Billboard Top R&B/Hip-Hop Albums chart. After the success of the mixtape, Epps made numerous guest appearances on tracks by prominent artists such as Kanye West ("Mercy") and Nicki Minaj ("Beez in the Trap").

On March 24, 2012, Epps announced that his debut studio album, originally titled T.R.U. to My REALigion, would be renamed Based on a T.R.U. Story and released on August 14, 2012. The album's lead single, "No Lie," featured Canadian rapper Drake, was released on May 8, 2012. On May 11, rumors spread that Epps had signed with Kanye West's GOOD Music label after West tweeted, "2 Chainz is charging 100k for a verse now cause he's G.O.O.D!!!!!" However, Epps later denied those rumors, saying, "He just said I'm good, like I'm ill. But we was talking and I think I was jeopardizing my brand sometimes by doing the homeboy special. So I think he felt like we should just put that out there that we ain't doing no more of that." On May 30, 2012, 2 Chainz was featured on Ciara's promotional single "Sweat," the intended lead single from her fifth studio album, One Woman Army.

Based on a T.R.U. Story debuted at number one on the US Billboard 200, selling 147,000 copies in its first week. The album received mixed reviews, earning a score of 55 on metacritic. By September 23, 2012, it had sold 288,000 copies in the United States. That September, Epps performed at the 2012 MTV Video Music Awards alongside his longtime friend Lil Wayne. After releasing his debut album, Based on a T.R.U. Story, Epps made significant strides. He organized his first solo worldwide tour, selling out most of its dates. He was nominated for over 13 BET Hip Hop Awards, and he won four; he earned The Source Magazine's "Man of the Year" award, released collaborative endeavors with ADIDAS and later Beats By Dre; and received nominations for three Grammy Awards, including Best Rap Album.

=== 2012–2015: B.O.A.T.S. II: Me Time and ColleGrove ===
In late 2012, Epps stated that once he completed the B.O.A.T.S. concert tour, he would reenter the studio. In November 2012, he revealed he was three songs deep into his second studio album. The album's estimated release date was April 2013. The rapper made a guest appearance on NBC's Law & Order: Special Victims Unit in an episode that aired on May 8, 2013. He also appeared as himself in the second season (episode 16, titled "...And Just Plane Magic") of the CBS sitcom 2 Broke Girls, where he traveled on the same private planes as the two main characters. On May 23, 2013, he announced that he would release his second studio album, B.O.A.T.S. II: Me Time, on September 10, 2013. On June 2, 2013, Epps premiered the first single from the album, titled "Feds Watching," at the Hot 97's Summer Jam. The song features Pharrell Williams, and they recorded it on the night of the 2013 Grammy Awards. On June 15, Epps announced the title of his second album would be B.O.A.T.S. II: Me Time. Def Jam Recordings released the album on September 10, 2013.

B.O.A.T.S. II: Me Time featured guest appearances from Pharrell Williams, Fergie, Drake, Lil Wayne, Pusha T, Mase, Chrisette Michele, Iamsu!, T-Pain, Dolla Boy, Rich Homie Quan, and Lloyd. Diplo, Mike WiLL Made It, Drumma Boy, J.U.S.T.I.C.E. League, Mannie Fresh, Wonder Arillo, Honorable C.N.O.T.E., and DJ Toomp handled the production of the album. The single "Used 2," along with the promotional singles "Where U Been?" and "Netflix," support it. Music critics generally gave the album positive reviews. It also fared decently commercially, debuting at number three on the US Billboard 200 and number two on the Top R&B/Hip-Hop Albums chart, selling 63,000 copies in its first week.

On October 23, 2013, Epps revealed that he had begun working on his third studio album immediately after the release of B.O.A.T.S. II. He also stated that he had the first single from his third album ready for release and that he still wanted to get Jay-Z featured on the album. In November 2015, 2 Chainz revealed that he was releasing a joint album with Lil Wayne, titled ColleGrove. On May 5, 2014, Epps released a brand new EP titled FreeBase for free digital download. The album featured seven songs and collaborations with Lil Boosie, A$AP Rocky, Rick Ross, and other artists. The EP earned over 200,000 downloads. In January 2014, Epps released a promotional single titled "I'm a Dog."

=== 2016–2019: Pretty Girls Like Trap Music and Rap or Go to the League ===
On January 27, 2016, Epps released an EP titled Felt Like Cappin. He released it on online streaming sites and iTunes. The single "Back On That Bullshit" featuring Lil Wayne promoted the EP

In 2016, Epps kicked off the year by releasing a collaborative album with rapper Lil Wayne titled ColleGrove in March. The album was supposed to mark the debut collaboration between 2 Chainz and Lil Wayne. However, Wayne's legal battle with Cash Money Records stopped him from taking the lead on the album. As a result, Epps assumed the role of the main artist on the album, with Lil Wayne making appearances on eight tracks. The album features prominent producers such as Honorable C.N.O.T.E., Mike Will Made It, Zaytoven, TM88, Metro Boomin, London on da Track, and more. ColleGrove received decent reviews from critics and fans.

Epps continued his work in 2016 with the August 5 release of the mixtape Daniel Son: Necklace Don, a 9-track mixtape that Epps released independently. Originally, the mixtape included Drake and YFN Lucci, but Epps decided to transfer the track "Big Amount ft. Drake" to the 2017 studio album Pretty Girls Like Trap Music due to its widespread appeal and the stellar performance by the featured artist. Daniel Son: Necklace Don received a 3-out-of-5-star review from XXL magazine.

2016 was wrapped up by Epps's third mixtape, titled Hibachi for Lunch, which was released on October 28. The 7-track mixtape originally featured Quavo, Gucci Mane, Ty Dolla Sign, and Future. However, the song "Good Drank ft. Quavo and Gucci Mane" was moved to Pretty Girls Like Trap Music. Mike Will Made It, K Swisha, and Buddah Bless were the notable producers for the project.

In 2017, Epps released his fourth studio album, titled Pretty Girls Like Trap Music, on June 16 on Def Jam Recordings. The album featured Travis Scott, Nicki Minaj, Swae Lee, Migos, Jhene Aiko, Pharrell Williams, and more. Mike Will Made It, Buddah Bless, Mike Dean, Murda Beatz, and others produced the album. Three official singles supported the album: "Good Drank", "It's a Vibe," and "4 AM". Additionally, a nationwide concert tour and several pop-up shops across the US promoted the album.^{[1] [2]} 2 Chainz alluded to the album showing "growth and maturation." He stated that the content would retain its edginess while elevating trap music to a level everyone could appreciate. Pretty Girls Like Trap Music received widespread critical acclaim, with many critics calling it his best album yet.

On November 15, 2017, the first episode of Most Expensivest aired on the TV network Viceland. The show focused on 2 Chainz visiting different locations and offering the "most expensive" goods and services. Each show covers a particular theme, ranging from personal health to extravagant indulgences. The show offered a unique insight into products and services that have been created with the explicit intent of being exclusive and expensive. 2 Chainz offered a unique and often humorous insight into the products, especially the ones that he personally found to be either amazing or ridiculous. The network renewed the show for a 20-episode third season, which aired in early 2019.

Epps released his fourth EP, The Play Don't Care Who Makes It, on February 8, 2018, through Def Jam Recordings. The EP includes four songs, with YG and Offset featuring on the track "Proud." T-Minus, June James, Nonstop Da Hitman, Streetrunner, and others handled the production.

On February 19, 2018, Epps announced his new album, Rap or Go to the League, initially set for release in 2018, but eventually released on March 1, 2019. Epps took to the mic on March 26, 2020, to announce the release of ColleGrove 2, a sequel to their 2016 album ColleGrove, slated for later that year.

=== 2020–2022: So Help Me God and Dope Don't Sell Itself ===
In August 2020, following his Verzuz battle with Rick Ross, Epps announced that he would title his upcoming sixth album So Help Me God! The album initially had a release date set for September 25, 2020. However, in the week leading up to its planned release, delays occurred due to sample clearances. Epps said, "It should be another couple weeks." He then announced its release for November 13, 2020, preceded by the single "Quarantine Thick," featuring Latto.

On September 24, 2020, Epps played against Big Boi and his family on the season premiere of the reality game show Celebrity Family Feud.

On August 3, 2021, Epps announced that his seventh album would be his last trap album, titled Dope Don't Sell Itself.

Epps hosts the concert series Amazon Music Live, which premiered on October 27, 2022.

=== 2023–present: Welcome 2 Collegrove and Def Jam departure ===
In November 2023, 2 Chainz and Lil Wayne released their first collaborative album together, Welcome 2 Collegrove. It acts as a sequel to Epps' third studio album, ColleGrove (2016), though both performers are finally billed as co-leading artists following the latter's label dispute being settled. 50 Cent also acts as a skit narrator on the album. Released on November 17, it debuted at number twenty on the Billboard 200, with first-week equivalent units of 34,000, despite mixed critical reviews. It was supported by two singles, "Presha" and "Transparency" (featuring singer Usher).

On October 14, 2024, after 22 years under Def Jam (his first eight through Ludacris' imprint and the following fourteen under the parent label), Epps announced that he parted ways with the label after choosing not to re-sign, deeming himself a "free agent".

On February 7, 2025, 2 Chainz, Larry June, and the Alchemist linked up to release the collaborative studio album Life Is Beautiful. It marks his first major release since leaving Def Jam.

== Personal life ==
Epps has two daughters born on July 26, 2008 and October 20, 2012. On October 14, 2015, Epps welcomed his third child, a son. On August 18, 2018, Epps married his longtime girlfriend and mother of his three children, Kesha Ward.

== Legal issues ==
At the age of 15, Epps received a conviction for felony cocaine possession. On February 14, 2013, authorities arrested him in Maryland for marijuana possession while he was en route to a concert at UMES. He was then cited and released.

On June 11, 2013, authorities arrested Epps while he was on board a departing flight at LAX airport for possession of a controlled substance. TSA agents discovered marijuana and promethazine in his checked bag. Authorities booked him and charged him with felony narcotics possession. Later that day, he posted a $10,000 bond and was released. He was due back in court on June 21, 2013. Two days prior, reports indicated that he was reportedly robbed at gunpoint outside a medical marijuana dispensary in San Francisco. Epps eventually pled guilty to misdemeanor possession of a controlled substance with the felony charge dropped. He was sentenced to an 18-month drug diversion program and, if he successfully completed it, the misdemeanor would have been dropped.

Just before midnight on August 21, 2013, Epps' tour bus was pulled over in Oklahoma City, Oklahoma, because the passenger side taillights were out. The arresting officer reported that he smelled marijuana and saw smoke through the open door of the bus after he had stopped and pulled over the bus. The driver of the bus shut the door and told officers he was not authorized to allow them on the bus. The officer said the marijuana smell gave him probable cause to search, but the driver refused to open the door. After many attempts to enter, the bus was towed with the men still aboard to the police training center in Oklahoma City. The officers obtained a search warrant, and the 10 men, including Epps, got off the bus. Police discovered two semi-automatic pistols and a 12-gauge pump shotgun, along with some prescription painkillers and marijuana residue, on the tour bus according to papers filed at Oklahoma County District Court.

== Business ventures ==
In October 2016, Epps opened a line of hoodies called CEO Millionaires, or Create Every Opportunity Millionaires. He also has his own line of sweaters called "Dabbing Sweaters."

On May 10, 2019, the Atlanta Hawks announced that 2 Chainz had acquired a minority ownership stake in the team's NBA G League affiliate, the College Park Skyhawks.

== Discography ==
Studio albums

- Based on a T.R.U. Story (2012)
- B.O.A.T.S. II: Me Time (2013)
- ColleGrove (2016)
- Pretty Girls Like Trap Music (2017)
- Rap or Go to the League (2019)
- So Help Me God! (2020)
- Dope Don't Sell Itself (2022)
- Playaz Only Live Once (2026)

Collaborative albums

- No Face No Case (with The Real University) (2020)
- Welcome 2 Collegrove (with Lil Wayne) (2023)
- Life Is Beautiful (with Larry June and the Alchemist) (2025)

== The Real University ==
The Real University (aka T.R.U., The Real U)
- Parent company: Warner Music Group
- Founded: 2015
- Founder: 2 Chainz (CEO)
- Status: Active
- Distributor: Atlantic
- Country of origin: United States
- Location: Atlanta, Georgia

On January 6, 2015, 2 Chainz announced that he was starting his own independent record label, "The Real University" (also known as "T.R.U." or "The Real U"). The announcement also revealed that frequent collaborators Cap.1 and Skooly were signed. Additionally, they signed former Young Money artist Short Dawg, who is now known as Fresh. They also revealed they would be releasing their debut mixtape, TRU Jack City, on January 27, 2015. On October 4, 2019, 2 Chainz announced that T.R.U. had signed a partnership deal with Atlantic Records.

=== Artists ===
- 2 Chainz
- Cap.1
- Skooly
- Fresh (formerly known as Short Dawg)
- C White

=== Discography ===
Artist	Title	Album details
Cap.1	Bird Bath EP	Released: January 13, 2015; Label: The Real University; Format: Digital Download

== Awards and nominations ==
=== BET Awards ===
Year	Nominee / work	Award	Result
2013	2 Chainz	Best Male Hip-Hop Artist	Nominated
2013	"Mercy" (with Kanye West, Big Sean and Pusha T)	Video of the Year	Nominated
2013	"Mercy" (with Kanye West, Big Sean and Pusha T)	Best Collaboration	Nominated
2013	"No Lie" (with Drake)	Best Collaboration	Nominated
2013	"No Lie" (with Drake)	Video of the Year	Nominated
2013	"Fuckin' Problems" (with A$AP Rocky, Drake and Kendrick Lamar)	Video of the Year	Nominated
2013	"Fuckin' Problems" (with A$AP Rocky, Drake and Kendrick Lamar)	Best Collaboration	Won
2013	"Fuckin' Problems" (with A$AP Rocky, Drake and Kendrick Lamar)	Coca-Cola Viewer's Choice	Nominated
2016	2 Chainz & Lil Wayne	Best Duo/Group	Nominated
2017	2 Chainz & Lil Wayne	Best Duo/Group	Nominated
2017	"No Problem" (with Chance the Rapper and Lil Wayne)	Best Collaboration	Won

=== BET Hip Hop Awards ===
Year	Nominee / work	Award	Result
2012	"Mercy" (with Kanye West, Big Sean and Pusha T)	Reese's Perfect Combo Award (Best Collabo, Duo or Group)	Won
2012	"Mercy" (with Kanye West, Big Sean and Pusha T)	Sweet 16: Best Featured Verse	Won
2012	"Mercy" (with Kanye West, Big Sean and Pusha T)	Best Club Banger	Nominated
2012	"Mercy" (with Kanye West, Big Sean and Pusha T)	Best Hip Hop Video	Nominated
2012	"No Lie" (featuring Drake)	Best Hip Hop Video	Nominated
2012	"No Lie" (featuring Drake)	People's Champ Award	Won
2012	Himself	Rookie of the Year	Won
2012	Himself	Made You Look Award	Nominated
2012	Himself	Hustler of the Year	Nominated
2012	Himself	MVP of the Year	Nominated
2013	Himself	MVP of the Year	Nominated
2013	Himself	Best Live Performer	Nominated
2013	Himself	Made You Look Award	Nominated
2013	"Fuckin' Problems" (with A$AP Rocky, Drake and Kendrick Lamar)	Best Hip Hop Video	Nominated
2013	"Fuckin' Problems" (with A$AP Rocky, Drake and Kendrick Lamar)	Reese's Perfect Combo Award (Best Collabo, Duo or Group)	Won
2013	"Fuckin' Problems" (with A$AP Rocky, Drake and Kendrick Lamar)	Best Club Banger	Nominated
2013	"Fuckin' Problems" (with A$AP Rocky, Drake and Kendrick Lamar)	People's Champ Award	Nominated
2016	"Watch Out"	Best Hip Hop Video	Nominated
2016	"No Problem"	Sweet 16: Best Featured Verse	Nominated

=== Grammy Awards ===
Year	Nominee / work	Award	Result
2013	Based on a T.R.U. Story	Best Rap Album	Nominated
2013	"Mercy" (with Kanye West, Big Sean and Pusha T)	Best Rap Performance	Nominated
2013	"Mercy" (with Kanye West, Big Sean and Pusha T)	Best Rap Song	Nominated
2014	"Fuckin' Problems" (with ASAP Rocky, Drake and Kendrick Lamar)	Best Rap Song	Nominated
2017	"No Problem" (with Chance the Rapper and Lil Wayne)	Best Rap Song	Nominated
2017	"No Problem" (with Chance the Rapper and Lil Wayne)	Best Rap Performance	Won

=== Soul Train Awards ===
- 2012: Best Hip Hop Song of the Year: "Mercy" (with Kanye West, Big Sean, and Pusha T) (Won)
- 2012: Best Hip Hop Song of the Year: "No Lie" (with Drake) (Nominated)
