= Conductor Williams production discography =

The following list is a discography of production by Conductor Williams, an American hip hop record producer and recording artist from Kansas City, Missouri. It includes a list of songs produced and co-produced by year, artist, album and title, sorted chronologically.

Note: Singles that were later included on an album are grouped chronologically with the release of the album, not the single.

== 2014 ==
=== Conductor Williams – Ready. Aim. Beautiful. ===
- All Tracks

== 2018 ==
=== Conductor Williams – Listen to Your Body. Talk to Plants. Ignore People ===
- All Tracks

== 2019 ==
=== Stik Figa & Conductor Williams – Moon. ===
- All Tracks

=== Conductor Williams – Winter Forever Cries ===
- All Tracks

=== Termanology – Vintage Horns ===
- 8. "Work While They Sleep" (feat. Artisin)
- 10. "Vintage Horns" (feat. Super Stah Snuk)

== 2020 ==
=== Conductor Williams – Positive Vibes Matter ===
- All Tracks

=== Westside Gunn – Pray For Paris ===
- 6. "Euro Step"

=== Westside Gunn – FLYGOD Is an Awesome God 2 ===
- 2. "Michael Irvin"
- 13. "Rebirth" (feat. Keisha Plum)

=== Stik Figa – Tomorrow is Forgotten ===
- All Tracks

=== Westside Gunn – Who Made the Sunshine ===
- 9. "Frank Murphy" (feat. Stove God Cooks, Estee Nack, Elcamino, Flee Lord, Smoke DZA) (Produced with OBSCUR8)

=== Solene – Book of Shadows ===
- All Tracks

=== Stik Figa – Heavens to Mergatroyd ===
- All Tracks

== 2021 ==
=== Eshon Burgundy – Don't Shoot the Messenger ===
- 3. "I knew you loved me" (feat. Lucius Rouser)
- 8. "Staircases"
- 9. "Goggles" (feat. Chvrch & Tone Spain)

=== Remy Banks – The Phantom of Paradise ===
- 4. "The Cycle."
- 5. "Triboro." (feat. Mr. Muthafuckin' eXquire, A-Trak & Wiki)
- 7. "New Era." (feat. GVVAAN)

=== Mach-Hommy – Pray for Haiti ===
- 3. "Folie Á Deux" (feat. Westside Gunn)
- 4. "Makrel Jaxon"
- 5. "The Stellar Ray Theory"

=== Tyler, The Creator – Call Me If You Get Lost ===
- 1. "Sir Baudelaire" (feat. DJ Drama) (co-produced with Tyler, The Creator)

=== Westside Gunn – Hitler Wears Hermes 8: Sincerely Adolf ===
- 2. "Blessed Times" (feat. AA Rashid)
- 3. "Mariota" (feat. Stove God Cooks)
- 12. "Spoonz" (feat. Conway The Machine)

=== Westside Gunn – Hitler Wears Hermes 8: Side B ===
- 16. "Munch" (feat. Tiona Deniece)

=== Stik Figa & Conductor Williams – Joyland ===
- All Tracks

=== Mach-Hommy – Balens Cho (Hot Candles) ===
- 13. "Self Luh"

== 2022 ==
=== Tha God Fahim & Your Old Droog – Tha Wolf on Wall St. 2: The American Dream ===
- 4. "Chubby Pockets"

=== Mach-Hommy – Dump Gawd: Triz Nathaniel ===
- All Tracks

=== Your Old Droog – Yod Stewart ===
- 1. "Nightmares And Dreams"

=== Westside Gunn – Peace "Fly" God ===
- 9. "Danhausen"

=== Rome Streetz – Kiss The Ring ===
- 2. "Heart On Froze"
- 3. "In Too Deep"
- 4. "Soulja Boy" (feat. Conway The Machine)
- 7. "Blow 4 Blow" (feat. Benny The Butcher, Stove God Cooks)
- 8. "Ugly Balenciaga's"
- 9. "1000 Ecstasy"
- 15. "Reversible"

=== Stik Figa – Valley of Dry Bones ===
- All Tracks

=== Westside Gunn – 10 ===
- 3. "Super Kick Party"
- 5. "Peppas" (feat. Black Star)
- 7. "BDP" (feat. Rome Streetz, Stove God Cooks)
- 9. "God Is Love" (feat. Estee Nack, Keisha Plum, Stove God Cooks)

=== Jabee – Good ===
- All Tracks

== 2023 ==
=== Conductor Williams – Conductor We Have A Problem ===
- All Tracks

=== Estee Nack – Nacksaw Jim Duggan ===
- 3. "BonductorWeHaveAProblem"

=== Termanology – The Summer Pack ===
- 4. "Designer" (feat. Wais P)

=== Samy Deluxe – Hochkultur 2 ===
- 1. "Martinshorn"

=== Rome Streetz - Noise Kandy 5 ===
- 5. "Chrome Magnum"

=== Drake – For All The Dogs ===
- 17. "8AM in Charlotte" (co-produced with Mario Luciano)

=== Westside Gunn – And Then You Pray For Me ===
- 5. "Suicide In Selfridges"
- 20. "The Revenge of Flip's Leg" (feat. Rome Streetz)

=== Conductor Williams – Conductor We Have A Problem 2 ===
- All Tracks

=== Drake – For All The Dogs Scary Hours Edition ===
- 25. "Stories About My Brother" (Co-produced with Jimmy Q)

=== Conway The Machine & Conductor Williams – Conductor Machine ===
- All Tracks

== 2024 ==
=== J. Cole – Might Delete Later ===
- 12. "7 Minute Drill" (Co-produced with T-Minus, Al Hug, & Elyas)

=== Conway The Machine – Slant Face Killah ===
- 2. "Mutty" (feat. Stove God Cooks)
- 5. "Kin Express" (feat. Larry June)
- 12. "Surf & Turf" (feat. Jay Worthy, T.F, 2 Eleven, Ab Soul)

=== Mach-Hommy – #RICHAXXHAITIAN ===
- 1. "(...)" (Co-produced with Elijah Hooks & Moo Latte)
- 7. "Sur le Pont d'Avignon (Reparation #1)" (feat. Sam Gendel) (Co-produced with Sam Gendel)
- 8. "Xerox Clat" (feat. Haitian Jack) (Co-produced with Max Théodore)
- 17. "HOLY ____"

=== Your Old Droog – Movie ===
- 7. "Mercury Thermometers"

=== Boldy James & Conductor Williams – Across The Tracks ===
- All Tracks

=== Conductor Williams & Rei the Imperial – Operation Flamethrower ===
- All Tracks

=== Leon Thomas – Mutt ===
- 6. "FEELINGS ON SILENT" (feat. Wale) (Co-produced with Leon Thomas, Nile Hargrove, & Frollen Music Library)

=== Jabee – The Spirit Is Willing, But The Flesh Is Weak ===
- 2. "No Love"
- 8. "Hear Me When I Pray"

=== Conductor Williams – Conductor We Have A Problem 3 ===
- All Tracks

=== Westside Gunn & DJ Drama – Still Praying ===
- 11. "Free Shots" (feat. Conway The Machine) (Co-produced with Statik Selektah)

== 2025 ==
=== Joey Badass – Pardon Me ===
- 1. "The Ruler's Back" (Co-produced with Mario Luciano)
- 2. "Sorry Not Sorry" (Co-produced with Mario Luciano)

=== Westside Gunn – 12 ===
- 11. "Dump World" (feat. Stove God Cooks, Elijah Hooks) (Co-produced with Mario Luciano)

=== Wiz Khalifa – Kush + Orange Juice 2 ===
- 17. "Super Duper High Outro"

=== Billy Woods – Golliwog ===
- 2. "STAR87"

=== Rome Streetz & Conductor Williams – Trainspotting ===
- All Tracks

=== Evidence – Unlearning Vol. 2 ===
- 8. "Stay Alive" (feat. Blu)
- 16. "Paint Pictures (Bonus)"

=== Westside Gunn – Heels Have Eyes 2 ===
- 5. "MANDELA"

=== Samy Deluxe & Conductor Williams – Samy x Conductor ===
- All Tracks

=== Jay Electronica – A Written Testimony: Leaflets ===
- 1. "Abracadabra" (Co-produced with The Blindsideduo & Mika Lett)

=== Jay Worthy – Once Upon A Time - Disc 1 ===
- 8. "Dark Tints" (feat. 03 Greedo)

=== Jev. – Lonerwrld, vol 2 ===
- 3. "JAMAICAN CUISINE."

=== Shaykh Hanif – The Hand That Feeds ===
- 11. "100 $ BILLS"

=== Big L – Harlem's Finest: Return of the King ===
- 4. "Fred Samuel Playground" (feat. Method Man) (Co-produced with napes & Ties)

=== Ché Noir & 7xvethegenius – Desired Crowns ===
- 4. "Sum Of Two Evils"

=== Ransom & Conductor Williams – The Uncomfortable Truth ===
- All Tracks

=== Skyzoo – Views of a Lifetime ===
- 5. "Devotion"

=== Chris Patrick – Pray 4 Me ===
- 3. "Frankenstein" (feat. Marco Plus) (Co-produced with napes)

=== Conway The Machine – You Can't Kill God With Bullets ===
- 4. "Diamonds" (feat. Roc Marciano)
- 5. "Hell Let Loose" (feat. DJ Whoo Kid, Tony Yayo) (Co-produced with Moo Latte)
- 11. "Mahogony Walls" (Co-produced with napes & Bonjour)
- 13. "Se7enteen5ive"

== 2026 ==
=== .IDK. – e.t.d.s. A Mixtape by .idk ===
- 9. "SCARY MERRi"
- 11. "FLAKKA" (feat. MF Doom) (Co-produced with .idk. & Max Théodore)
- 15. "SCRAMBLED EGGS - TBC :(" (feat. Ogi) (Co-produced with Jimmy Q)

=== Drake — ICEMAN ===
- 17. "Firm Friends"

=== Tierra Whack — WHACK'S MUSUEM ===
- 1. "WHACK JOB"
- 2. "WAX PAPER"
- 4. "WIGGIDY WHACK"
- 11. "TWO FIFTEEN"

=== Rome Streetz – Sock It To My Pocket ===
- 4. "Belt 2 Ass"
