= Steve Smith (British musician) =

British musician (born 1972)

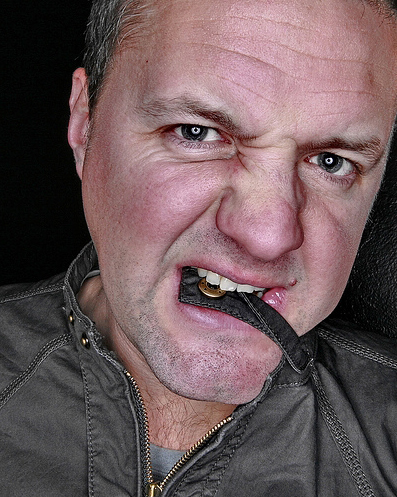
- Smith in 2008

Background information
- Born: 1972 (age 53–54)
- Genres: House; electronic; alternative rock; new wave
- Occupations: Musician; singer; songwriter; composer
- Instruments: Vocals; guitar; percussion
- Years active: 1992–present
- Website: www.stevesmithmusic.com

Steve Smith is a British musician, best known as the vocalist for the Grammy award-winning house music group Dirty Vegas and as the percussionist for the new wave band Squeeze. He has recorded albums and played concerts for American rock band Portugal the Man since 2008.

== Musical career ==
The band Dirty Vegas, for which Steve Smith is the frontman, signed with UK label Parlophone after a bidding war in 2001. Their first album led to a world tour and three Grammy nominations, winning one for Best Electronic Recording. Their second album saw success with the song "Walk into the Sun" hitting No.1 on the Billboard Dance Chart.

In 2011, their third album "Electric Love" entered the US iTunes Dance Album chart at No.3 and the band embarked on a full US tour. They were named No.6 Best selling electronic artists of the decade by Billboard.

In 2014, they released their EP "Let the Night" which reached No.3 on the US iTunes Dance Album chart and the lead single went gold in Italy.

In 2016, Dirty Vegas was asked by HRH Prince William to perform at Kensington Palace for a charity event. In 2017, Smith contributed to Portugal the Man's album "Woodstock" and joined Squeeze as a full-time member, touring the world and opening for Roger Waters. In 2020, Dirty Vegas released a new single "Happening" and Squeeze was a special guest for Hall and Oates at Madison Square Gardens.

=== Higher Ground ===
In 1992, Smith joined a band called Higher Ground, as a percussionist. Shortly after, band's lead singer left, and Smith became the lead vocalist. The group disbanded in the late 1990s.

=== Dirty Vegas ===
After Higher Ground disbanded, Smith met Paul Harris, a European club DJ, at a Swiss party. They formed a dance group called Dirty Vegas, and shortly thereafter recruited Ben Harris, who had worked at a Camden recording studio. One of the group's early songs, "Days Go By", caught the attention of a Mitsubishi executive, who tracked the group down personally to procure rights to use the song in a car advert. The song subsequently became a top 40 hit in the UK and the US. The group subsequently released their self-titled debut album, which reached the top 10 on the Billboard 200 and was certified Gold by the RIAA less than two months after its release. Dirty Vegas went on tour to promote the album, and served as an opening act for artists including Groove Armada, Moby, and Underworld.

In 2004, the band released their second album, "One;" the album was panned by critics, and was a commercial disappointment, failing to enter the Billboard 200 or the UK Albums chart. The album contained one hit single: "Walk into the Sun", which reached number one on the US Dance Club Songs and the US Dance/Mix Show Airplay charts.

Dirty Vegas went on hiatus, during which time Smith worked on a solo record. The group re-joined in 2011, and released their third album, "Electric Love", in April of that year. A single from the album, "Little White Doves", was certified Gold in Italy. Ben Harris left the group, and Dirty Vegas returned as a duo in 2015, releasing their fourth studio album, "Photograph".

=== Solo ===
In 2006, Smith began recording his first solo album, "This Town", which was released on 22 January 2008.

Smith performed at a gala for Prince William at Kensington Palace in November 2016. He also composed the score for the film "Boys & Girls Guide to Getting Down".

In February 2017, Smith released an EP titled Union. The EP included a single called "My Favorite Shoes". Regarding the song, Smith stated that the song "is a simple feel-good story about two people who have become slightly lost in their world of jobs, modern living, kids etc. One is saying to the other, let's forget about those things that we feel tie us down."

=== Squeeze ===
In July 2017, the new wave band Squeeze announced that Smith had joined their official lineup as their new percussionist and backing vocalist.

== Discography ==
With Dirty Vegas

- "Dirty Vegas" (2002)
- "One" (2004)
- "Electric Love" (2011)
- "Photograph" (2015)

Solo

- "This Town" (2007)
- "Modern World" (2013)
- Union EP (2017)
