= DJ Green Lantern production discography =

The following list is a discography of production by DJ Green Lantern, an American hip hop record producer and recording artist from Rochester, New York. It includes a list of songs produced and co-produced by year, artist, album and title.

== 2003 ==
=== Sheek Louch - Walk Witt Me ===
- 14. "Mighty D-Block (2 Guns Up)" (featuring Styles P, Jadakiss, and J-Hood)

=== Obie Trice - Cheers (Bonus Track) ===
- 19. "Synopsis"

== 2004 ==
=== Jadakiss - Kiss of Death ===
- 1. "Intro"

=== Ludacris - The Red Light District ===
- 2. "Number One Spot"

== 2005 ==
=== Ruff Ryders - Vol. 4: The Redemption ===
- 15. "Keep the Gunz Cocked (If It's Beef... Remix)" (performed by Jadakiss, Kartoon, Infa-Red, and Flashy)

=== Fort Minor - We Major ===
- 13. "There They Go (Green Lantern Remix)" (featuring Sixx John)
- 15. "Nobody's Listening (Green Lantern Remix)" (performed by Linkin Park)

=== The Notorious B.I.G. - Duets: The Final Chapter ===
- 17. "Mi Casa" (featuring R. Kelly and Charlie Wilson) (produced with Diddy, Mario Winans, and J-Dub)

== 2006 ==
=== Papoose - A Threat and a Promise ===
- 12. "License to Kill (Remix)" (featuring Mobb Deep)

=== Papoose - The Boyz in the Hood ===
- 8. "Robbery Song"

=== Ice Cube - Laugh Now, Cry Later ===
- 11. "The Nigga Trap"
- 21. "Pockets Stay Fat" (featuring Lil Scrappy)

=== Busta Rhymes - The Big Bang ===
- 6. "In the Ghetto" (featuring Rick James) _{(produced with Dr. Dre)}

== 2007 ==
=== Styles P - Super Gangster (Extraordinary Gentleman) ===
- 9. "Holiday" (featuring Max B)

== 2008 ==
=== Erykah Badu ===
- "Real Thang" (Green Lantern Remix)

=== Pete Rock - NY's Finest ===
- 8. "Don't Be Mad"

=== Nas - Untitled Nas album ===
- 15. "Black President"
- 16. "Like Me"

=== Scarface - Emeritus ===
- 2. "High Powered" (featuring Papa Rue) _{(produced with N.O. Joe)}

== 2009 ==
=== M.O.P. - Foundation ===
- 11. "Bang Time" (featuring Styles P)

=== Wale - Attention Deficit ===
- 13. "Beautiful Bliss" (featuring Melanie Fiona and J. Cole) _{(produced with Mark Ronson)}

== 2010 ==
=== Styles P & DJ Green Lantern - The Green Ghost Project ===
- 1. "Nothing to Lose"
- 2. "Double Trouble" (featuring Sheek Louch)
- 4. "Send a Kite" (featuring Dwayne Collins)
- 6. "Invasion" (featuring Jadakiss and Junior Reid)
- 8. "Pablo Doe" (featuring N.O.R.E. and Uncle Murda)
- 10. "Pretty Little Thing" (featuring June Summers)
- 14. "Bang Time" (featuring M.O.P.)

=== Capone-N-Noreaga - The War Report 2: Report the War ===
- 15. "Obituary"

== 2011 ==
=== Game - Purp & Patron ===
- 25. "Favorite DJ" (Remix) (featuring Jim Jones, Bun B and Clinton Sparks)

== 2012 ==
=== Roscoe Dash - 2.0 ===
- 12. "Wasted" (featuring J. Holiday and YT)

=== Steve Aoki - Emergency (Remixes) ===
- 4. "Emergency (Evil Genius Remix)

=== Westside Gunn - Hitler Wears Hermes ===
- 2. "Rayfuls Plug"

== 2017 ==
=== Westside Gunn & DJ Green Lantern - Hitler on Steroids ===
- 14. "Stoves"
- 19. "Nasty Remix"
- 24. "Laura"

=== Royce da 5'9" - The Bar Exam 4 ===
- 27. "Still Waiting" (featuring Nick Grant and Elzhi)

=== Conway the Machine & DJ Green Lantern - More Steroids ===
- 3. "Steroids"

=== Westside Gunn - Hitler Wears Hermes V ===
- 7. "Finn Balor"

=== Benny the Butcher - Butcher on Steroids ===
- 6. "Camillia's"

== 2018 ==
=== Conway the Machine - Everybody Is F.O.O.D. ===
- 7. "The Scorpion"

== 2019 ==
=== Ras Kass - Soul on Ice 2 ===
- 4. "F.L.Y."

=== Eto & Flee Lord - RocAmeriKKKa ===
- 1. "Don’t Get Lined Up"

=== Westside Gunn - Hitler Wears Hermes 7 ===
- 8. "Undertaker vs. Goldberg" (featuring Conway the Machine)

=== Elcamino - Elcamino 2 ===
- 1. "What Would You Do"

== 2020 ==
=== Eto - The Beauty of It ===
- 14. "Pissin' in Bottles"

=== Heem - Long Story Short ===
- 9. "My Diary" (featuring Amber Simone)
- 10. "Warring Ave."
- 11. "Letter to Shay"

== 2021 ==
=== Mach-Hommy - Pray for Haiti ===
- 14. "Au Revoir" (featuring Melanie Charles)

=== Westside Gunn - Hitler Wears Hermes 8: Side B ===
- 17. "99 Avirex" (featuring Stove God Cooks and AZ)

== 2022 ==
=== Snoop Dogg - BODR ===
- 8. "Crip Ya Enthusiasm"

=== Rome Streetz - Kiss the Ring ===
- 10. "Armed & Dangerous" (featuring Armani Caesar)
