= Richaxxhaitian =

2024 album by Mach-Hommy

#Richaxxhaitian

Studio album by Mach-Hommy
- Released: May 17, 2024
- Genre: Hip-hop
- Length: 47:10
- Language: Haitian Creole; English
- Label: Mach-Hommy, Inc.
- Producer: Conductor Williams; Elijah Hooks; Fortes; Hephzibah; Kaytranada; Max Theodore; Messiah Musik; Moo Latte; NoraTheExplorerQuelle Chris; SadhuGold; Sam Gendel

Mach-Hommy chronology
Balens Cho (2021)	#Richaxxhaitian (2024)

#Richaxxhaitian (stylized in all caps) is the twenty-fourth studio album by Haitian-American rapper Mach-Hommy. The album was self-released on May 17, 2024, and features guest appearances from Drea d'Nur, Georgia Anne Muldrow (as Hephzibah), Haitian Jack, Black Thought, Roc Marciano, Your Old Droog, Big Cheeko, and 03 Greedo. The album features production by Conductor Williams, Quelle Chris, Elijah Hooks, SadhuGold, Sam Gendel, Kaytranada, Fortes, and Messiah Musik, among others.

The album serves as the final installment of a "tetralogy", comprising 2016's H.B.O (Haitian Body Odor), 2019's Wap Konn Jòj!, and the 2021 albums Pray for Haiti and Balens Cho (Hot Candles).

== Background ==
The title of the album was first teased by Jens "The Guru", through an Instagram post on April 4, 2023. A private listening party for the album was held on June 15, 2023, in New York City, with tickets costing US$77.77. A second listening party was held on February 22, 2024, also in New York, with tickets costing $1,111.11.

Mach-Hommy announced the release of the album on May 6, 2024, and released the lead single, "#RICHAXXHAITIAN", featuring Kaytranada and 03 Greedo. The album was released on May 17, a day before Haitian Flag Day. On May 23, the album was removed from Spotify and YouTube, receiving no payment for the issues. He posted a 15-minute video on his YouTube account, criticizing their gross mismanagement of not only his metrics and metadata but that of many others.

== Critical reception ==
Professional ratings
Review scores
Source	Rating
AllMusic	4/5 stars
Pitchfork	8.0/10

Matthew Ritchie of Pitchfork described the album as "a quintessential Mach-Hommy project", and said of it: "Mach has cemented himself as a shapeshifter, contorting his voice to rap, sing, and glide over the grainy surface of his beats." Gabriel Bras Nevares of HotNewHipHop said: "This new album builds off of the struggle and perseverance of previous installments to craft a triumphant and awe-inspiring experience".

=== Accolades ===
"Sur le Pont d'Avignon (Reparation #1)", one of the songs on #Richaxxhaitian, was named as the ninth-best song of 2024 by Time magazine. The full album also appeared on many year-end lists, as detailed in the table below.

Year-end lists for #Richaxxhaitian
Publication	List	Rank	Ref.
Complex	The 50 Best Albums of 2024	26	
Consequence	20 Best Rap Albums of 2024	17	
The Guardian	The 50 Best Albums of 2024	36	
HotNewHipHop	Top 40 Hottest Hip-Hop Albums of 2024	3	
Paste	The 20 Best Rap Albums of 2024	4	
Rolling Stone	The 20 Best Hip-Hop Albums of 2024	17	
Stereogum	The 50 Best Albums of 2024	49	
Vibe	The 25 Best Hip-Hop Albums of 2024	9	

== Track listing ==
All tracks are written by Mach-Hommy with featured artists and producers if noted; "#Richaxxhaitian" additionally written with Odion Iruoje.

#Richaxxhaitian track listing
No.	Title	Producer(s)	Length
1.	"(...)"	Elijah Hooks; Conductor Williams; Moo Latte	2:36
2.	"Antonomasia" (featuring Roc Marciano)	SadhuGold	2:26
3.	"Politickle" (featuring Drea D'Nur)	SadhuGold; Elijah Hooks	3:37
4.	"Sonje" (featuring Hephzibah)	Hephzibah	3:28
5.	"Padon" (featuring Tha God Fahim)	SadhuGold	3:06
6.	"Empty Spaces" (featuring Your Old Droog)	SadhuGold	2:16
7.	"Sur le Pont d'Avignon (Reparation #1)" (with Sam Gendel)	Conductor Williams; Napes; Gendel	2:33
8.	"Xerox Clat" (featuring Haitian Jack)	Max Theodore; Moo Latte	2:06
9.	"Gorgon Zoe Lan"	SadhuGold	1:06
10.	"The Serpent and the Rainbow"	SadhuGold	2:53
11.	"Copy Cold" (featuring Black Thought)	Quelle Chris	3:46
12.	"#Richaxxhaitian" (featuring Kaytranada and 03 Greedo)	Kaytranada	2:47
13.	"Lon Lon"	Fortes	3:01
14.	"Aux Bon Parfums"	Messiah Musik	1:25
15.	"Same 24" (featuring Big Cheeko)	Fortes	3:26
16.	"Guggenheim Jeune"	SadhuGold	2:51
17.	"Holy ____"	Conductor Williams	3:47
Total length:			47:10

Vinyl version additional track listing
No.	Title	Producer(s)	Length
2.	"Sobriquet" (featuring Tha God Fahim)	SadhuGold
4.	"Bon Bagay"	SadhuGold; NoraTheExplorer

=== Vinyl version notes ===
- "Sobriquet" is identical to "Antonomasia", only replacing Roc Marciano's verse with Tha God Fahim's.
- "Sur le Pont d'Avignon (Reparation 1)" and "Holy ____" are absent entirely.
- "Padon" is retitled "Pardon" and features a second Mach-Hommy verse in place of Tha God Fahim's. It is renumbered to track 14.
- "Sonje" is renumbered to track 16.
- "Pardon", "Copy Cold" and "Xerox Clat" (renamed "Xerox Twats") feature reworked instrumentals.
