= List of Billboard number-one electronic albums of 2002 =

These are the albums that reached number one on the Billboard Dance/Electronic Albums chart in 2002.

== Chart history ==
Key
†	Indicates best-performing album of 2002

Issue date	Album	Artist	Reference
January 5	Pulse	Various artists	
January 12	Pulse	Various artists	
January 19	Pulse	Various artists	
January 26	Pulse	Various artists	
February 2	Pulse	Various artists	
February 9	Pulse	Various artists	
February 16	Come with Us	The Chemical Brothers	
February 23	Come with Us	The Chemical Brothers	
March 2	Come with Us	The Chemical Brothers	
March 9	Come with Us	The Chemical Brothers	
March 16	Come with Us	The Chemical Brothers	
March 23	Come with Us	The Chemical Brothers	
March 30	Come with Us	The Chemical Brothers	
April 6	Blade II	Soundtrack	
April 13	Blade II	Soundtrack	
April 20	Blade II	Soundtrack	
April 27	Blade II	Soundtrack	
May 4	Blade II	Soundtrack	
May 11	Release	Pet Shop Boys	
May 18	Louie DeVito's Dance Factory	Louie DeVito	
May 25	Louie DeVito's Dance Factory	Louie DeVito	
June 1	18 †	Moby	
June 8	18 †	Moby	
June 15	18 †	Moby	
June 22	Dirty Vegas	Dirty Vegas	
June 29	Dirty Vegas	Dirty Vegas	
July 6	Dirty Vegas	Dirty Vegas	
July 13	Dirty Vegas	Dirty Vegas	
July 20	Dirty Vegas	Dirty Vegas	
July 27	Dirty Vegas	Dirty Vegas	
August 3	Dirty Vegas	Dirty Vegas	
August 10	Dirty Vegas	Dirty Vegas	
August 17	Dirty Vegas	Dirty Vegas	
August 24	Dirty Vegas	Dirty Vegas	
August 31	Dirty Vegas	Dirty Vegas	
September 7	Dirty Vegas	Dirty Vegas	
September 14	Dirty Vegas	Dirty Vegas	
September 21	Dirty Vegas	Dirty Vegas	
September 28	Heaven	DJ Sammy	
October 5	Heaven	DJ Sammy	
October 12	Dirty Vegas	Dirty Vegas	
October 19	Dirty Vegas	Dirty Vegas	
October 26	Heaven	DJ Sammy	
November 2	Heaven	DJ Sammy	
November 9	Bunkka	Oakenfold	
November 16	Bunkka	Oakenfold	
November 23	N.Y.C. Underground Party 5	Louie DeVito	
November 30	N.Y.C. Underground Party 5	Louie DeVito	
December 7	N.Y.C. Underground Party 5	Louie DeVito	
December 14	N.Y.C. Underground Party 5	Louie DeVito	
December 21	N.Y.C. Underground Party 5	Louie DeVito	
December 28	N.Y.C. Underground Party 5	Louie DeVito	
