= Balens Cho (Hot Candles) =

2021 studio album by Mach-Hommy

Studio album by Mach-Hommy
- Released: December 4, 2021
- Genre: Hip-hop
- Length: 23:53
- Labels: Mach-Hommy, Inc.

Mach-Hommy chronology
Pray for Haiti (2021)	Balens Cho (Hot Candles) (2021)	Dollar Menu 4 (2022)

Balens Cho (Hot Candles) is the twentieth studio album by Haitian-American rapper Mach-Hommy. Independently released December 4, 2021, it contains features from AA Rashid, Sam Gendel and Tha God Fahim. Production is handled by Conductor Williams, Fortes, Messiah Musik, Nicholas Craven and Ras G, among others.

== Release and reception ==
Released December 4, 2021, Balens Cho (Hot Candles) is Mach-Hommy's second release of 2021, following Pray for Haiti in May. The "Hot Candles" subitlte comes from the title's English translation from Haitian Creole. Lyrically, the album explores the colonization of Haiti, as well as his desire to open a tech school in Haiti. The album released on vinyl in September 2022.

Balens Cho (Hot Candles) received positive reviews from critics. Matthew Ismael Ruiz of Pitchfork rated the album an 8.1, saying "Even when it’s somber and elegiac, Balens Cho is devoid of self-pity. […] The stories he tells here are not merely his own. He understands, better than most, the role of mythmaking in reshaping reality". Charles Davis of Post-Trash said "Mach-Hommy solidifies his magnificence with Balens Cho—not just simply within the hip-hop of the moment, but with respect to all recorded music. This is a reminder of why, despite the insanity of the world, each moment is a blessing".

== Track listing ==
All tracks are written by Mach-Hommy. Song titles are stylized in all caps.

No.	Title	Music	Length
1.	"La Prèmiere Bougie"		0:07
2.	"Labou"	Nicholas Craven	2:48
3.	"La Deuxième"		0:14
4.	"Separation of the Sheep and the Goats"	Nicholas Craven	2:51
5.	"Magnum Band Remix" (featuring AA Rashid)	Ras G	2:14
6.	"LaTroisième"		0:18
7.	"Lajan Sal"	Nicholas Craven	2:21
8.	"La Quatrième"		0:09
9.	"Wooden Nickels" (featuring Sam Gendel)	Fortes	4:14
10.	"Traditional"	Nicholas Craven	1:42
11.	"La Cinquième"		0:09
12.	"Money Magnets" (featuring Tha God Fahim)	Messiah Musik	3:12
13.	"Self Luh"	Conductor Williams	3:34
Total length:			23:53
