= Untitled (Fishing) =

1981 painting by Jean-Michel Basquiat

- Artist: Jean-Michel Basquiat
- Year: 1981
- Medium: Oilstick, acrylic and spray enamel on canvas
- Movement: Neo-expressionism
- Dimensions: 198.1 cm × 172.7 cm (78.0 in × 68.0 in)
- Location: Private collection

Untitled is a painting created by American artist Jean-Michel Basquiat in 1981. The artwork, which depicts a fisherman displaying his catch hanging at the end of a line, sold for $26.4 million at Christie's in November 2012.

== History ==
Jean-Michel Basquiat painted Untitled in 1981, a pivotal year when he transitioned from street artist into the adulation of the New York art scene. He worked in the basement of Annina Nosei's gallery in SoHo where Untitled was executed. The artwork depicts a fisherman wearing a crown of thorns and a halo of the same nature. He is standing at the center of the canvas and proudly displays his catch, a large fish hanging at the end of a fishing rod. His black body reveals a white skeletal figure.

The painting had previously been auctioned in 1988, a few months after Basquiat's death, and sold for $110,000. Sold by fashion photographer Patrick Demarchelier in 2012, it was anticipated to break records before its auction in 2012. Loic Gouzer, international specialist of post-war and contemporary art at Christie's said in a statement: "In contrast to most artists, Basquiat created his best paintings at the beginning of his career. Untitled 1981 unites all the elements of energy, freedom and boldness that one looks for in Basquiat. The market has been waiting a long time for a work of this caliber and freshness, therefore we expect it to set a new record for Basquiat, an artist who is in the process of being recognized as a classic of Post-War American Art alongside Warhol, De Kooning and Pollock." The painting lived up to the pre-sale hype, selling for $26.4 million in November 2012. The sale exceeded Basquiat's previous record of $20.1 million for another Untitled (1981) sold in June 2012. That record has since been surpassed by multiple other paintings. His current record high at auction is Untitled (1982), which sold for $110.5 million at Sotheby's in May 2017.

The cover of the 2021 album Pray for Haiti by Haitian-American rapper Mach-Hommy is a pastiche of Untitled.

== Exhibitions ==
The painting has been exhibited at the following art institutions:

- Jean-Michel Basquiat at Whitney Museum of American Art in New York, October 1992–February 1993; The Menil Collection in Houston, March–May 1993; Des Moines Art Center in Iowa, May–August 1993; Montgomery Museum of Fine Arts in Alabama, November 1993–January 1994.
- Basquiat at Fondation Beyeler in Switzerland, May–September 2010; Musée d'Art Moderne de la Ville de Paris, October 2010–January 2011.

== See also ==
- List of paintings by Jean-Michel Basquiat
- 1981 in art
