= Walk into the Sun =

"Walk Into the Sun"

Single by Dirty Vegas

from the album One
- B-side: "State of Mind"
- Released: 11 October 2004
- Recorded: 2004
- Genre: House
- Length: 5:20
- Label: Parlophone
- Songwriter(s): Ben Harris, Paul Harris, Steve Smith
- Producer(s): Dirty Vegas

Dirty Vegas singles chronology
"Simple Things, Pt. 2" (2003)	"Walk Into the Sun" (2004)	"Changes" (2011)

"Walk Into the Sun" (sometimes stylized as "Walkintothesun) is a song by British house music trio Dirty Vegas. It served as the lead single from the group's second studio album, One (2004), and was commercially released on 27 September 2004.

== Release ==
The single was commercially released on 27 September 2004. In October 2004, the single was released to Top 40 and Modern Adult Contemporary stations in the United States, while remixes by the band and King Unique were sent to club DJs.

== Reception ==
=== Critical ===
In an album review of One for Billboard, critic Michael Paoletta named the single a highlight of the record, commending its departure from the dance-pop of their debut and favorably comparing it to then-current hits by the Killers and Franz Ferdinand. Dave Dierksen, writing for PopMatters, was critical of several aspects of One, but regarded "Walk into the Sun" as one of its saving graces, writing that "It's hard not to be forgiving as you pump your fist to" the song. AllMusic, while awarding the album itself only two stars out of five and accusing the record of sounding "faceless", designated "Walk into the Sun" as an Allmusic Pick from the track listing.

Dorian Lynskey, writing for the Guardian, criticized the song's lyrics, singling out its opening lyric — "Lately I've been feeling different/Like I've come from outer space" — as sounding like he had "made them up on the spot", and described vocalist Steve Smith's delivery to that of "a man who rolls up the sleeves of his sport jacket".

=== Commercial ===
In the United Kingdom, "Walk into the Sun" debuted at number 54 on the Official Charts Company's UK Singles Chart on 23 October 2004. It thereby became the group's third single to enter the chart, and third consecutive entry to reach the top 75, after "Days Go By" in 2001 and "Ghosts" in 2002. The following week, it slid to number 77 on the singles chart, and fell off of the chart altogether the following week. It thus became the group's first entry not to reach the top 40, as well as attaining the fewest number of weeks on the chart of any of their entries.

In the United States, "Walk into the Sun" debuted on the Billboard Dance Club Songs chart at number 33 on the chart dated 6 November 2004. It thus became the group's third single to place within the top 40 of that chart, following "Days Go By" (2002) and "I Should Know" (2003). The following week, it rose nine spots to number 24. On the chart dated 18 December 2004, it rose one spot to top the Dance Club Songs chart, becoming the group's second number one entry on that tally, following "Days Go By" in June 2002. The song spent a total of 14 weeks on the chart.

The single also entered several other dance charts in the United States. It topped the Dance/Mix Show Airplay chart on 8 January 2005, becoming the group's second entry on that chart (after "Days Go By") and the first to attain a position in the top 25; in sum, it spent 20 weeks on the tally. It also became the group's second entry on the Dance Singles Sales chart, spending a single week on the list on 4 December 2004, when it placed at number 21.

== Media usage ==
The track was featured at the end of the episode "Last Execution" on the first season of the show Ghost Whisperer. The track is also featured in an episode of One Tree Hill season two. The single was also featured on the second disc of the 2005 dance compilation Thrivemix, Vol. 1.

== Track listings ==
Standard CD single CDR6647

1. "Walk into the Sun" (radio edit)
2. "State of Mind"

Maxi-CD single CDRS6647

1. "Walk into the Sun" (radio edit)
2. "Walk into the Sun" (King Unique Sunstroke Vocal Mix)
3. "Walk into the Sun" (King Unique Dirty Dub)
4. "Walk into the Sun" (Dirty Vegas Dub Mix)
5. "Walk into the Sun" (video)

12" single 12R6647

1. "Walk into the Sun" (King Unique Sunstroke Vocal Mix)
2. "Walk into the Sun" (Dirty Vegas Club Mix)

== Charts ==
Chart (2004)	Peak position
UK Singles (OCC)	54
US Dance Singles Sales (Billboard)	21
US Dance Club Songs (Billboard)	1
US Dance/Mix Show Airplay (Billboard)	1

== See also ==
- List of Billboard Hot Dance Club Play number ones of 2004
