= Ras G =

American record producer and DJ (1978–2019)

- Also known as: Ras G & the Afrikan Space Program; Ras G & the Alkebulan Space Program
- Born: Gregory Shorter Jr. December 11, 1978; Los Angeles, California, U.S.
- Died: July 29, 2019 (aged 40) Leimert Park, Los Angeles, California, U.S.
- Genre: Hip-hop
- Occupations: Producer; DJ
- Instruments: Sampler; Roland SP-404
- Years active: 2005–2019
- Labels: Brainfeeder; Leaving Records; Poo-Bah Records; Ramp Recordings; Fat Beats; Ghetto Sci-Fi Music; Street Corner Music; Akashik Records
- Website: www.poobah.com

Gregory Shorter Jr. (December 11, 1978 – July 29, 2019), better known by his stage name Ras G, was an American record producer and DJ from Los Angeles, California. He was a co-founder of the record label Poo-Bah Records and was also associated with Brainfeeder. He released 24 albums and mixtapes since his debut in 2008.

== Life and career ==
Ras G started his career in 2005. He released Brotha from Anotha Planet in 2009. His solo album, Down 2 Earth, was released on Ramp Recordings in 2011. He released a free EP, titled Ainat, in 2012. In 2013, he released Back on the Planet on Brainfeeder.

He died in the Leimert Park neighborhood of Los Angeles on July 29, 2019, aged 40.

== Discography ==
=== Studio albums ===
- Ghetto Sci-Fi (2008)
- I of the Cosmos (2008)
- Brotha from Anotha Planet (2009)
- Down 2 Earth (2011)
- Spacebase Is the Place (2011)
- Raw Fruit (2013)
- Back on the Planet (2013)
- Raw Fruit Vol. 2 (2014)
- Seat of the Soul (2014) (with VHVL)
- Raw Fruit Vol. 3 (2014)
- 5 Chuckles (2014) (with The Koreatown Oddity)
- Down 2 Earth Vol. 2 (2014)
- Raw Fruit Vol. 4 (2015)
- The Gospel of the God Spell (2016)
- Baker's Dozen (2016)
- 5 Chuckles: In the Wrld (2016) (with The Koreatown Oddity)
- My Kinda Blues (2017)
- Stargate Music (2018)
- Down 2 Earth Vol. 3 (2019)
- Down 2 Earth Vol. 4 (2019)
- Dance of the Cosmos (2019)
- Blunts Rolled (2025)

=== Compilation albums ===
- Beats of Mind (2008)
- Raw Fruit Vol. 1-2 (2014)
- Raw Fruit Vol. 3-4 (2015)
- El-Aylien Tapes (2016)

=== EPs ===
- Day & Night (2005) (split with Black Monk)
- Overcast78 (2005)
- Beats of Mind (2006)
- Black Dusty Rhodes Meets Ras G in a Beat Cypher (2007) (split with Black Dusty Rhodes)
- I of Cosmos (2008)
- Destination There (2009)
- Alternate Destiny (2010)
- El-Aylien Part I (2010)
- Los Angeles 3/10 (2010) (split with Samiyam)
- Views of Saturn Vol. 1 (2011) (split with Sun Ra)
- Kampala Blackouts (2012)
- El-Aylien Part II (2012)
- Ainat (2012)
- Untitled (2013) (split with Gonjasufi)
- Other Worlds (2015)
- Alternate Destiny (2017)

=== Singles ===
- "777" (2013) (split with Gonjasufi)

=== Productions ===
- Dwight Trible & The Life Force Trio - "The Rhythm" from Love Is the Answer (2005)
- Kaigen - "Primitive Planet" from Re: Bloomer (2011)
- Open Mike Eagle - "Warhorn" (2012)
- Zeroh - "Yumshit" from Classic Drug References Vol.01 (2013)
- The Koreatown Oddity - "Film Roll Splices and the Deleted Scenes" from 200 Tree Rings (2014)
- Mach-Hommy - “Magnum Band Remix” from Balens Cho (Hot Candles) (2021)

=== Remixes ===
- Take - "Hollywoodn't (Ras G's Buddah Box Remix)" from Forward Motion from Behind Tall Weeds (2006)
- Take - "Golden Gate Reflections (Ras G Remix)" from Plus Ultra (2007)
- Tremolo Audio - "Umbral (Ras G Remix)" from Visitas (2008)
- Flying Lotus - "Sleepy Dinosaur (Ras G Remix)" from L.A. EP 2 X 3 (2008)
- Clouds - "Timekeeper (Ras G Remix)" (2008)
- Build an Ark - "Dawn (Ras_G & the Afrikan Space Program Remix)" from Dawn Remixes (2009)
- King Midas Sound - "Cool Out (Ras G & the Afrikan Space Program Rework)" from Without You (2011)
- Thundercat - "Daylight (Ras G Remix)" (2012)
- Mono/Poly - "Los Angeles (Ras G Remix)" from Killer B's (2013)
- GB - "Made It Through (Ras G's Modification)" from Within These Machines: Modifications (2013)
- World Champion - "Avocado Galaxy (Ras G Dub Mix)" from Avocado Galaxy Remixes (2015)
- Butcher Bear - "Feel the Difference in the Velvet Coffin (Ras G & the Afrikan Space Program Remix)" from Don't Save Yourself (2016)
- Dexter Story - "Veggie Wondem Combo (Ras G Afrikan Space Program Remix)" from Wondem Remixed (2016)
- Gonjasufi - "Afrikan Spaceship (Ras G Ghettoscifi Remix)" from Mandela Effect (2017)
- Chitose Hajime - "Kubanuhabushi (Ras G Remix)" from Hajimeuta Yūgen: Hajime Chitose Ami Shimauta Remix (2019)
