= Back on the Planet =

Studio album by Ras G
- Released: August 6, 2013
- Genre: Instrumental hip-hop
- Length: 44:02
- Label: Brainfeeder
- Producer: Ras G

Ras G chronology
Raw Fruit (2013)	Back on the Planet (2013)	Raw Fruit Vol. 2 (2014)

Back on the Planet is a studio album by American hip-hop producer Ras G. It was released through Brainfeeder on August 6, 2013.

== Critical reception ==
Professional ratings
Aggregate scores
Source	Rating
Metacritic	70/100
Review scores
Source	Rating
AllMusic	4/5 stars
Drowned in Sound	6/10
Exclaim!	6/10
Pitchfork	7.8/10
PopMatters	4/10 stars
The Skinny	4/5 stars
XLR8R	6/10

At Metacritic, which assigns a normalized rating out of 100 to reviews from critics, the album received an average score of 70, based on 9 reviews, indicating "generally favorable reviews".

Bram E. Gieben of The Skinny gave the album 4 out of 5 stars, calling it "a perfect, psychedelic hybrid of dusty LA beat-scene boom-bap and the cosmic jazz excursions of the Sun Ra Arkestra." Daryl Keating of Exclaim! said: "Paradoxically fusing ancient, grinding rhythms and ultra-modern, plush beats, Back on the Planet skips between two distant eras while actively laughing at everything in the middle."

Meanwhile, Gary Suarez of PopMatters gave the album 4 out of 10 stars, writing: "A glorified beat tape, for better or worse, it plays out like a pirate radio transmission from some collapsing Afro-Caribbean wormhole, broadcasting the sort of intemperate tinkering one might tolerate from a Wolf Eyes side project." Lainna Fader of XLR8R commented that the album "is merely a collection of somewhat compelling, hip-hop-leaning beats that largely go nowhere; it's more like a dressed-up beat tape, and not a particularly exciting one at that."

== Track listing ==
No.	Title	Length
1.	"Back on the Planet"	3:57
2.	"All Is Well..."	3:03
3.	"Cosmic Lounge Kisses"	2:17
4.	"Along the Way"	3:25
5.	"_G Spot Connection"	2:47
6.	"Ommmmm..."	2:53
7.	"One for Kutmah"	2:54
8.	"Culture Riddim"	1:35
9.	"Been Cosmic"	2:04
10.	"Injera, Lentils, and Kale"	2:21
11.	"Asteroid Storm..."	2:50
12.	"Find Ya Self (Anu Wrld)"	2:07
13.	"Natural Melanin Being..."	3:29
14.	"Ancestral Data Bank"	3:01
15.	"Children of the Hapi"	3:22
16.	"Jus There..." (featuring Brotha There)	2:05
