= Driving While Black (film) =

2015 film by Paul Sapiano

- Directed by: Paul Sapiano
- Written by: Paul Sapiano; Dominique Purdy
- Produced by: Djay Brawner
- Starring: Dominique Purdy
- Cinematography: Bryant Jansen
- Edited by: Enrique Aguirre
- Release dates: June 13, 2015 (San Francisco Black Film Festival); February 1, 2018 (United States)
- Running time: 94 minutes
- Country: United States
- Language: English

Driving While Black is a 2015 American black comedy film directed by Paul Sapiano, starring Dominique Purdy. Inspired by the real-life experiences of Purdy, who co-wrote the screenplay with Sapiano, the film tells the story of a Black man who has to deal with racial profiling in Los Angeles, California. It was released in the United States on February 1, 2018.

== Plot ==
A young, aspiring artist named Dimitri lives in Los Angeles, California. He pays rent by delivering pizza. He enjoys listening to music and smoking weed with his friends. Because of the color of his skin, he has been often stopped by police officers while driving.

== Cast ==
- Dominique Purdy
- Sheila Tejada
- Peter Cilella
- Joanie Bovil
- Gloria Garayua
- John Mead
- Mayank Bhatter
- Rayan Lawrence

== Release ==
The film had its world premiere at the San Francisco Black Film Festival on June 13, 2015. It was released in the United States on February 1, 2018.

== Reception ==
On review aggregator website Rotten Tomatoes, the film holds an approval rating of 63% based on 8 reviews, with a weighted average rating of 6.8/10.

B. Alan Orange of MovieWeb described the film as "half comedy of errors and half hard-bitten realism, tucked into a sly treatise on 21st-century over-policing." Dante James of Film Threat gave the film a 7 out of 10, writing, "it's ultimately about how policing in Black communities need to change, but there is also a strong message for all of us that we need to be better about protecting ourselves when we find a cop at our car windows." Aimee Murillo of OC Weekly called the film "relevant, hilarious, well-acted and totally engaging." John DeFore of The Hollywood Reporter commented that "Though some will take offense, those ready for a quick time out from fight-the-power indignation may well roll with the picture, which relies on the charms of Purdy, an off-screen musician known as Koreatown Oddity." Katie Walsh of Los Angeles Times wrote, "The film coasts on Purdy's laid-back stoner charm, and though the film itself is a bit too slack, it's a fine showcase for his voice, which delivers some pointed social commentary despite the chill vibes." Scott Tobias of Variety stated that "Few will likely pull over for this micro-indie, but Purdy's effortless charisma in the lead role deserves a citation."

The film won the Audience Award for Narrative Feature at the 2015 New Orleans Film Festival.
