= Firm Friends (song) =

2026 song by Drake

Song by Drake

from the album Iceman
- Released: May 15, 2026
- Length: 5:02
- Label: OVO; Republic
- Producers: Conductor Williams; Al Hug

"Firm Friends" is a song by Canadian rapper Drake from his studio album Iceman (2026). It was produced by Conductor Williams and Al Hug.

== Content ==
Lyrically, Drake discusses loyalty ("You do what you should've done, you stick with your day ones.") and betrayals he faced during his long career and life and specficially since the 2024 beef as well of directing criticism at his rivals and talking about their envy towards him. He targets rapper ASAP Rocky in an acronym-filled line ("KYS ASAP, that's some shit that you could do for me") and later questions the history of his relationship with singer Rihanna ("Tell 'em why you really hate me and what year did she date me"). He references his 2015 song "Energy" and his older albums ("I am So Far Gone that a Thank Me Later is useless now"), with the latter alluding to nostalgia for the blog era of rap, and again suggests inflated streaming numbers among his enemies.

== Critical reception ==
Armon Sadler of Billboard ranked "Firm Friends" as the eighth best song on Iceman, praising Drake's collaboration with Conductor Williams and writing "Though there are some lyrical displays that fall ahead of this one, 'Firm Friends' is still splendid." Aron A. of HotNewHipHop commented that the song "feels leagues ahead of some of their previous collaborations on Scary Hours 3, channeling the same icy precision that made leaks like 'Fighting Irish' so compelling in the first place. Drake leans into effortlessness without sounding disengaged, which becomes one of the album's biggest strengths."

== Charts ==
Chart performance for "Firm Friends"
Chart (2026)	Peak position
Australia (ARIA)	61
Australia Hip Hop/R&B (ARIA)	25
Canada Hot 100 (Billboard)	25
Global 200 (Billboard)	35
Greece International (IFPI)	73
Nigeria Bubbling Under Hot 100 (TurnTable)	17
South Africa Streaming (TOSAC)	19
US Billboard Hot 100	31
US Hot R&B/Hip-Hop Songs (Billboard)	22
