= Mike Shabb =

Canadian rapper

Mike Shabb is a Canadian rapper and record producer. He is most noted for his 2024 album Sewaside III, which was longlisted for the 2025 Polaris Music Prize.

Originally from Sherbrooke, he moved to Montreal at age 18. He released his debut mixtape, Sewaside LP, on SoundCloud in 2016, and followed up in 2018 with the full-length album Northwave.

He then released the albums Life Is Short in 2020 and Sewaside II in 2022, before releasing Sewaside III in 2024, which received a 7.6/10 from Pitchfork.

He has also appeared as a guest musician on recordings by Nicholas Craven and Boldy James.

== Discography ==
- Le précieux joyau (with Monk.E) (2026)
- Sewaside IV (2026)
- LIVE AT THE TABERNACKLE Vol. 2 (with Estee Nack) (2026)
- Hood Olympics II (2026)
- Maple Flavored (with Paco P) (2026)
- The Lost Tapes (with Drega33) (2026)
- Melted Faces, Vol. 1 (2025)
- Fight The Power! (2025)
- Sugar Gadgets II (with SeinsSucrer) (2025)
- Shabbvangogh (2025)
- Sewaside III (2024)
- Sugar Gadgets (with SeinsSucrer) (2023)
- LIVE AT THE TABERNACKLE (with Estee Nack) (2023)
- MONCLER BOYZ (with RU$H) (2023)
- Hood Olympics (2023)
- Dump Gawd: Rhyme Pays (with Tha God Fahim) (2023)
- Shadow Moses (with Nicholas Craven) (2022)
- Bokleen World (2022)
- Quarantine Flow (2021)
- Life Is Short (2020)
- GLOOM (2019)
- RX (with Jeune Loup) (2019)
- Newave (2018)
- Northwave (2018)
- SEWASIDE (2016)
