= Isthisforreal? =

Studio album by the Koreatown Oddity
- Released: July 22, 2022
- Genre: Hip-hop
- Length: 24:54
- Label: Stones Throw
- Producers: The Koreatown Oddity; Taz Arnold

The Koreatown Oddity chronology
Little Dominiques Nosebleed (2020)	Isthisforreal? (2022)	Purdy (2026)

Singles from Isthisforreal?
- 1. "Misophonia Love" Released: June 30, 2022

Isthisforreal? (stylized in all caps) is a studio album by American rapper and record producer Dominique Purdy under the pseudonym the Koreatown Oddity. It was released on July 22, 2022, through Stones Throw Records. It received generally favorable reviews from critics.

== Background ==
Dominique Purdy, also known as the Koreatown Oddity, is an American rapper and record producer from Los Angeles. Isthisforreal? is his first studio album since Little Dominiques Nosebleed (2020). In between, he released the singles "Breastmilk" (2021), "Aggro Crag" (2022), and "Misophonia Love" (2022).

The album was released on July 22, 2022, through Stones Throw Records. Music videos were released for "Misophonia Love", "Fundrazors", and "Something or Nothing?".

== Critical reception ==
Professional ratings
Aggregate scores
Source	Rating
Metacritic	73/100
Review scores
Source	Rating
AllMusic	3.5/5 stars
Clash	6/10
The Line of Best Fit	9/10
Pitchfork	7.1/10

According to the review aggregator Metacritic, Isthisforreal? received "generally favorable reviews" based on a weighted average score of 73 out of 100 from 6 critic scores.

Paul Simpson of AllMusic commented that the album "deals with perceptions of reality, focusing on moments or situations that are particularly hard to believe, or painful to deal with." He added, "The album taps out at 25 minutes, but it's urgent enough that it clearly makes its point within that time frame." Tom Morgan of PopMatters stated, "It's not its creator's most compelling work, but it's a fascinating artifact nonetheless." Steven Loftin of The Line of Best Fit wrote, "while this isn't an album filled with hooks or the most bombastic beats, it is instead filled with a flare that reeks of originality, moments that shine, and a drawl that explains even the heftiest of topics with inimitable calm." Meanwhile, Alex Rigotti of Clash criticized that "it's pulled in so many directions that it never fully explores its premise." He added, "It seems more concerned with the general idea of unreality at the cost of the album it promised."

Kyle Kohner of Beats Per Minute placed it at number 36 on his list of the "Top 50 Albums of 2022".

== Track listing ==
All tracks are written by the Koreatown Oddity, except "Homeboys in Outerspace" written with Kahil Sadiq.

Isthisforreal? track listing
No.	Title	Length
1.	"Opening Confession"	0:40
2.	"Fundrazors"	2:34
3.	"Misophonia Love"	1:58
4.	"Indifferent"	1:49
5.	"Isthisforreal?"	1:55
6.	"Homeboys in Outerspace"	3:01
7.	"History Tension"	2:09
8.	"Something or Nothing?"	3:05
9.	"Helllooo???"	3:17
10.	"Existential Landlord"	1:41
11.	"An Endless Run"	2:39
Total length:		24:54

Notes

- All track titles are stylized in all caps.

== Personnel ==
Credits adapted from liner notes.

- The Koreatown Oddity – production (1–6, 8–11)
- Kyle Erby – vocals (1)
- Paul Sapiano – vocals (1, 5, 6, 8)
- Skyler Duf – vocals (2)
- Vertina Love – vocals (6)
- Eagle Nebula – vocals (6)
- Kahil Sadiq – vocals (6)
- Taz Arnold – production (7)
- Rose – vocals (8)
- SooMin Chun – vocals (8)
- Collin Davis – engineering
- Jake Viator – mixing, mastering
- Mark Bijasa – artwork, design
