= The Koreatown Oddity =

American rapper (born 1984)

- The Koreatown Oddity in 2022

Background information
- Also known as: Koreatown Oddity; KTO
- Born: Dominique Purdy; 1984 (age 41–42); Koreatown, Los Angeles, California, U.S.
- Genre: Hip-hop
- Occupations: Rapper; record producer; actor; writer; stand-up comedian
- Years active: 2012–present
- Labels: New Los Angeles; Strictly Cassette; Architects and Heroes; Leaving; Stones Throw
- Formerly of: Vivians; 5 Chuckles
- Website: thekoreatownoddity.bandcamp.com

Dominique Purdy (born 1984), better known by his stage name The Koreatown Oddity, is an American rapper, record producer, actor, writer, and former stand-up comedian from Koreatown, Los Angeles, California.

== Early life ==
Dominique Purdy was born in 1984. He is originally from Koreatown, Los Angeles, California. He was raised by his mother, who introduced him to hip-hop music. His parents never married and his father lived in Compton, California. While in high school, he performed at the Laugh Factory comedy club at night.

== Career ==
Purdy started releasing his music in 2012. In 2014, he released a studio album, 200 Tree Rings, on New Los Angeles. In 2014, he released a collaborative album with Ras G, titled 5 Chuckles. LA Weekly included him on the "15 L.A. Bands to Watch in 2015" list. In 2015, he released a collaborative album with Mndsgn, titled Vivians. In 2016, he released another collaborative album with Ras G, titled 5 Chuckles: In the Wrld. In 2017, he released a studio album, Finna Be Past Tense, on Stones Throw Records.

In 2020, he released a studio album, Little Dominiques Nosebleed, on Stones Throw Records. It received favorable reviews from AllMusic and Pitchfork. Complex included him on the "Best New Artists of the Month" list in June 2020. In 2022, he released a studio album, Isthisforreal?, on Stones Throw Records.

== Discography ==
=== Studio albums ===
- No Health Insurance (2013)
- 200 Tree Rings (2014)
- 5 Chuckles (2014) (with Ras G)
- Vivians (2015) (with Mndsgn, as Vivians)
- 5 Chuckles: In the Wrld (2016) (with Ras G)
- Finna Be Past Tense (2017)
- Little Dominiques Nosebleed (2020)
- Isthisforreal? (2022)
- Purdy (2026)

=== Mixtapes ===
- Eat a Dead Goat (2012)
- Buzzmixers Revenge (2012)
- Pops 45s (2012)
- Exit the Dragon's Mouth (2013)
- Snake Sheddings (2014)
- Off with the Horse (2015)
- Ram Be Gone (2016)
- A Monkey's Death (2017)
- A Beat at the Table (2018)
- Rooster (2018)
- That's a No from Me Dog (2019)
- When Pigs Fly (2020)
- Trapped Rats (2022)
- Tiger/Ox (2024)
- Wabbit Season (2024)

=== Singles ===
- "Breastmilk" (2021)
- "Aggro Crag" (2022)
- "Misophonia Love" (2022)

== Filmography ==
=== Feature films ===
- The Boys & Girls Guide to Getting Down (2006), Jonny
- Driving While Black (2015), Dimitri
