= Little Dominiques Nosebleed =

Studio album by the Koreatown Oddity
- Released: June 19, 2020
- Genre: Hip-hop
- Length: 57:13
- Label: Stones Throw
- Producer: The Koreatown Oddity

The Koreatown Oddity chronology
| Finna Be Past Tense (2017) | Little Dominiques Nosebleed (2020) | Isthisforreal? (2022) |

Little Dominiques Nosebleed is a studio album by American rapper and record producer Dominique Purdy under the pseudonym the Koreatown Oddity. It was released on June 19, 2020, through Stones Throw Records.

== Background ==
Dominique Purdy, also known as the Koreatown Oddity, is an American rapper and record producer from Los Angeles. Little Dominiques Nosebleed is his first studio album since Finna Be Past Tense (2017). The album's title tracks ("Little Dominiques Nosebleed Part 1" and "Little Dominiques Nosebleed Part 2") detail two childhood car accidents that caused him to have frequent nosebleeds and broke his leg.

The album was released on June 19, 2020, through Stones Throw Records. Music videos were released for "Kimchi", "No Llores", and "Weed in LA".

== Critical reception ==
Professional ratings
Review scores
| Source | Rating |
|---|---|
| AllMusic | 4.5/5 stars |
| Pitchfork | 7.1/10 |

Phillip Mlynar of Bandcamp Daily wrote, "The dual influence of immediate family and local environment emerge as key themes across a 16 song self-produced project that brims with irrepressible jazz and funk loops." Paul Simpson of AllMusic described the album as "a dense, psychedelic epic loaded with surprise left turns, playful nostalgia, and supporting roles by an extensive cast of guests, with an ambitious scope and surreal sense of humor recalling masters like Prince Paul, Madlib, and the Pharcyde." Matt Mitchell of Paste stated, "Abandoning the fragmented, non-linear storytelling of his previous efforts, Little Dominiques Nosebleed is memoir delivered in intimacy, layered with jazz arrangements, narrative conflict and interpersonal warmth." Chase McMullen of Beats Per Minute called the album "a massive leap forward for the prolific artist."

It was nominated for Best Hip-Hop/Rap Record at the 2021 Libera Awards.

=== Accolades ===
Year-end lists for Little Dominiques Nosebleed
| Publication | List | Rank | Ref. |
|---|---|---|---|
| AllMusic | AllMusic Best of 2020 | — | |
| Bandcamp Daily | The Best Hip-Hop Albums of 2020 | — | |
| Beats Per Minute | BPM's Top 50 Albums of 2020 | 35 | |

== Track listing ==
Little Dominiques Nosebleed track listing
| No. | Title | Length |
|---|---|---|
| 1. | "Looking Back from the Future" (featuring Baby Rose and C.S. Armstrong) | 2:56 |
| 2. | "Little Dominiques Nosebleed Part 1" (featuring Sudan Archives) | 4:26 |
| 3. | "Koreatown Oddity" | 3:12 |
| 4. | "Chase the Spirit" (featuring Jimetta Rose) | 3:20 |
| 5. | "Darknesses Interlude" | 1:35 |
| 6. | "Ginkabiloba" (featuring Taz Arnold) | 3:01 |
| 7. | "Weed in LA" | 2:18 |
| 8. | "Little Dominiques Nosebleed Part 2" | 2:23 |
| 9. | "A Bitch Once Told Me" (featuring Ahwlee) | 5:11 |
| 10. | "No Llores" (featuring Trenttruce, Edule, and Emmanuel Coto) | 3:56 |
| 11. | "Attention Challenge" (featuring Swift, Skyler Duf, Fatlip, Giovanni Marks, Nita Darling, Corrine Atkinson, and Lewis) | 6:07 |
| 12. | "Kimchi" | 2:49 |
| 13. | "The World's Smallest Violin" (featuring Jimetta Rose and Corrine Atkinson) | 5:26 |
| 14. | "We All Want Something" (featuring Anna Wise) | 3:00 |
| 15. | "Lap of Luxury" (featuring Qur'an Shaheed and Kintaro) | 4:37 |
| 16. | "Little Dominiques Nosebleed Outro" | 2:47 |
| Total length: | | 57:13 |
