= Days Go By (Dirty Vegas song) =

2001 single by Dirty Vegas

Single by Dirty Vegas

from the album Dirty Vegas
- Released: 7 May 2001
- Genre: House
- Length: 7:07 (album version); 3:41 (single edit)
- Label: Hydrogen; Credence; Parlophone
- Songwriters: Victoria Horn; Steve Smith
- Producer: Dirty Vegas

Dirty Vegas singles chronology
"Days Go By" (2001)	"Ghosts" (2002)

Music video
- "Days Go By" on YouTube

"Days Go By" is a song by British electronic group Dirty Vegas, released as their debut single in the United Kingdom on 7 May 2001. It served as the lead single from their self-titled debut album (2002). The song initially peaked at number 27 on the UK Singles Chart the same month. The single's artwork was done by American artist Richard Phillips.

In mid-2002, "Days Go By" became a US radio hit following its usage in a television advertisement for the 2003 Mitsubishi Eclipse, eventually peaking at number 14 on the Billboard Hot 100 and receiving the Grammy Award for Best Dance Recording at the 45th Annual Grammy Awards in 2003. In the wake of its success in the US, it re-entered and peaked at number 16 on the UK Singles Chart, topped the UK Dance Singles Chart, and reached number six in Canada.

== Music video ==
Early one morning, a man is wearing a business suit and a well-worn pair of orange high-top Chuck Taylor All-Stars trainers. He lays out a cardboard mat in front of a restaurant, turns on a boombox, and starts a routine of popping, locking, and doing the robot to the music.

A few people stop to watch. As they do, the man is replaced by a younger version of himself wearing a tracksuit and brand-new orange Chucks, and he begins breakdancing to the music. One of the spectators tells the story: one day each year, the man comes to the restaurant and dances on the pavement from sunrise to sunset. He does so in the hope of bringing back a lost girlfriend, who gave him the orange trainers as a present when they were young but who ultimately left him because he "couldn't stop." (What he couldn't stop is left ambiguous.) The music pauses briefly while a few spectators voice their thoughts about the young woman's fate. At the end of the day, two of them leave to get a cup of coffee together. The man in the business suit catches a brief glimpse of his girlfriend's younger self, then he picks up his belongings and leaves.

The video was filmed at Chroni's Famous Sandwich Shop in East Los Angeles, California. Garland Spencer and Byron McIntyre portrayed the dancer's younger and older selves, respectively.

There are two versions of the music video; one has the three band members observing from a table at the restaurant, while the other replaces those shots with footage of them in a silver Mitsubishi Eclipse stopped at a traffic light. In addition to the replaced shots, the Eclipse version of the video includes footage of the car arriving at and departing from a traffic light, suggesting that they arrived in the morning and remained at the light all day to watch the man dance.

== Mitsubishi Eclipse advert ==
A Mitsubishi executive saw the music video for "Days Go By" in a hotel room, and personally tracked the group down to procure rights to feature the song in an advertisement. The song was licensed to be used in the Mitsubishi ad, which began airing in early 2002. A New York radio station began playing the song, which was subsequently released to rhythmic and top 40 radio stations in mid-2002. American brand awareness for Mitsubishi went from 44% to 60% following the use of the song in the commercial.

== Track listings ==
=== Original release ===
UK and European CD single; UK cassette single

1. "Days Go By" (7-inch mix)
2. "Days Go By" (full vocal mix)
3. "Days Go By" (acoustic)

UK 12-inch single

A. "Days Go By" (full vocal mix)
B. "Days Go By" (Lucien Foort remix)

Belgian CD single

1. "Days Go By" (radio edit)
2. "Days Go By" (Lucien Foort remix)

Canadian 12-inch single

A1. "Days Go By" (Vegas mix) – 6:06
B1. "Days Go By" (original extended) – 8:10
B2. "Days Go By" (Lucien Foort remix) – 9:00

=== Re-release ===
UK CD1

1. "Days Go By"
2. "Days Go By" (Scumfrog vocal remix)
3. "Days Go By" (Paul Oakenfold vocal remix)

UK CD2

1. "Days Go By" (radio edit)
2. "Days Go By" (Steve Osborne acoustic mix)
3. "1979" (live—BBC Radio 1 Evening Session)
4. "Days Go By" (video)

One-track digital download

1. "Days Go By" – 7:12

Three-track digital download

1. "Days Go By" – 3:43
2. "Days Go By" (Hydrogen Rockers vocal mix) – 6:51
3. "Days Go By" (2001 acoustic) – 2:43

== Charts ==
=== Weekly charts ===
2001 weekly chart performance for "Days Go By"
Chart (2001)	Peak position
Belgium (Ultratip Bubbling Under Flanders)	14
Ireland (IRMA)	41
Scottish Singles Sales (Official Charts)	31
UK Singles (Official Charts)	27
UK Dance (Official Charts)	13

2002 weekly chart performance for "Days Go By"
Chart (2002)	Peak position
Australia (ARIA)	67
Canada (Nielsen SoundScan)	6
Europe (Eurochart Hot 100)	65
Ireland (IRMA)	28
Ireland Dance (IRMA)	4
New Zealand (Recorded Music NZ)	27
Scottish Singles Sales (Official Charts)	17
Switzerland (Schweizer Hitparade)	97
UK Singles (Official Charts)	16
UK Dance (Official Charts)	1
US Billboard Hot 100	14
US Adult Top 40 (Billboard)	21
US Dance Club Play (Billboard)	1
US Mainstream Top 40 (Billboard)	7
US Maxi-Singles Sales (Billboard)	2
US Rhythmic Top 40 (Billboard)	12

=== Year-end charts ===
Year-end chart performance for "Days Go By"
Chart (2002)	Position
Canada (Nielsen SoundScan)	23
Canada Radio (Nielsen BDS)	45
US Billboard Hot 100	80
US Adult Top 40 (Billboard)	67
US Dance Club Play (Billboard)	14
US Mainstream Top 40 (Billboard)	46
US Maxi-Singles Sales (Billboard)	15
US Rhythmic Top 40 (Billboard)	67

== Release history ==
Release dates and formats for "Days Go By"
Region	Date	Format(s)	Label(s)	Ref.
United Kingdom	7 May 2001	12-inch vinyl; CD; cassette	Hydrogen; Credence; Parlophone	
Spain	July 2001	12-inch vinyl; CD	Vendetta	
Australia	23 July 2001	CD	EMI; Credence; Parlophone	
Various	23 April 2002	One-track digital download	New State Music	
United States	13 May 2002	Radio	Capitol; Credence	
United States	20 May 2002	Hot adult contemporary radio	Capitol; Credence	
Australia (re-release)	12 August 2002	CD	EMI; Credence; Parlophone	
United Kingdom (re-release)	30 September 2002	12-inch vinyl; CD	Credence; Parlophone	
Various	23 February 2003	Three-track digital download	New State Music	
