= Gloria Garayua =

American actress

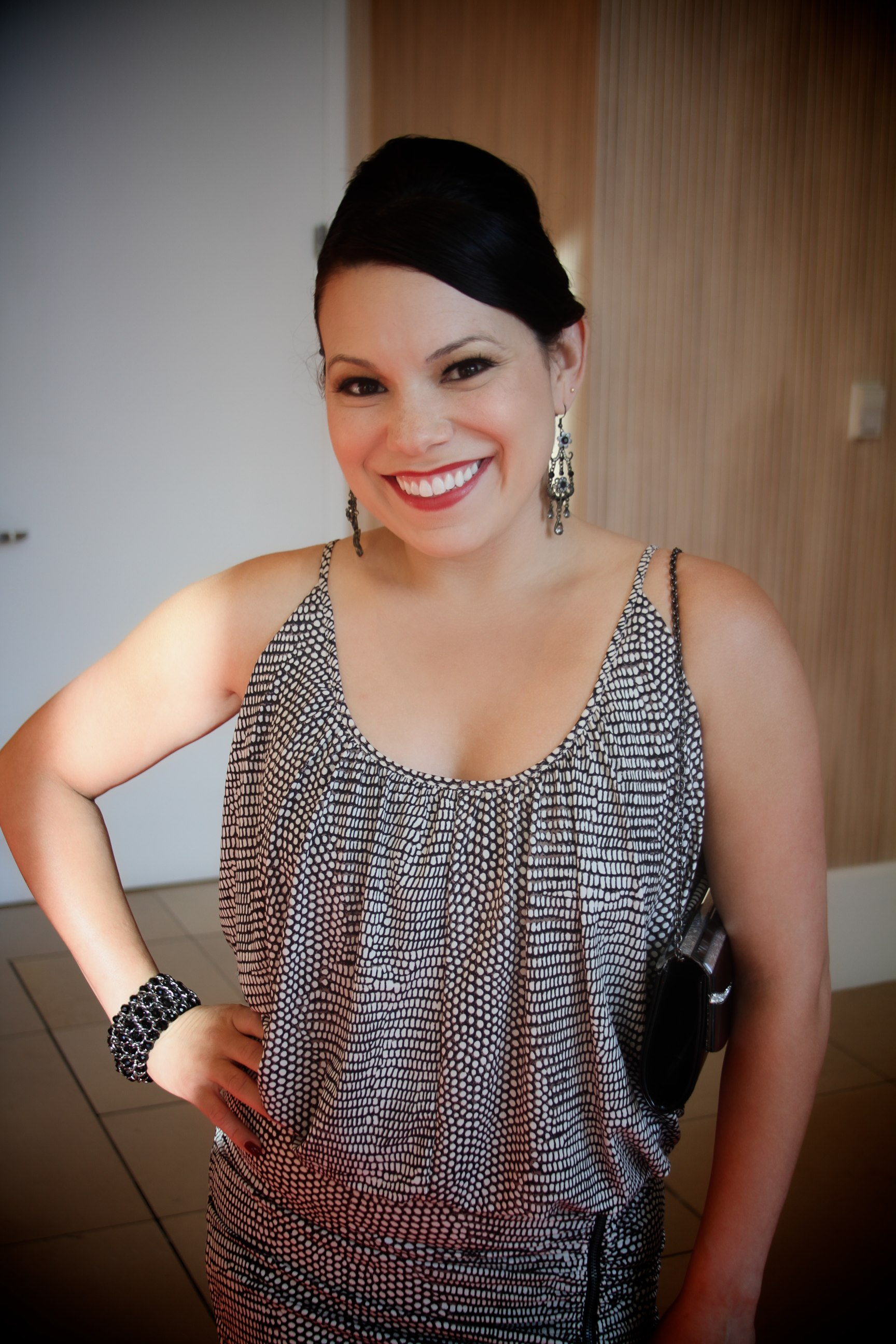
- Garayua at the 2014 Imagen Awards
- Occupation: Actress
- Years active: 2004–present
- Website: www.gloriagarayua.com

Gloria Garayua is an American actress. Garayua made her major film debut in the 2005 comedy film Fun With Dick and Jane, and is now commonly cast in guest roles on long-running series such as Six Feet Under, Weeds and The Shield. After being cast in an ongoing role in Grey's Anatomy, Garayua has played recurring roles in other popular TV shows such as Cougar Town and How to Get Away with Murder.

== Early life and education ==
Garayua graduated from Long Island University, Post with a Bachelor's Degree in acting, graduating summa cum laude. Her portrayal of Ariel in The Tempest earned her an Irene Ryan Nomination, where she placed as the 1st National Alternate. She joined Hermandad de Sigma Iota Alpha, Inc. at the Xi chapter.

== Acting career ==
Garayua moved to California in 2004 after being cast in the leading role in Nilo Cruz's Two Sisters and A Piano at the Old Globe Theater in San Diego. Afterwards, she moved to the greater Los Angeles area and was cast for a minor role in Fun With Dick and Jane after only 2 weeks. During this time she also appeared in an episode of NYPD Blue as a guest star.

In 2007, Garayua guest starred in an episode of Grey's Anatomy as an intern named Graciella. She would ultimately become a recurring guest star in the show, appearing in a total of 24 episodes from 2007 to 2010. In 2008 she played the part of Reyna in two episodes of Showtime's Weeds titled No Man is Pudding and The Three Coolers.

Other notable roles include Nurse Chapel in American Housewife, Madison Young in Criminal Minds, Vita Chacon in Cold Case, and Gloria Ortiz in ER. As of 2024, Garayua has worked in over 75 projects as an actress.

Garayua is also a prolific stage actress that has been featured in productions such as La Posada Magica (The Magic Journey) at South Coast Repertory, Real Women Have Curves at CASA 0101, The Skriker at the Kennedy Center Stage and Romeo and Juliet at the Bloomsburg Theatre Ensemble.

== Awards ==
Garayua was nominated for Best Female Principal Performer by the San Francisco Bay Area Theater Critics Circle in 2009.

Fixing Paco, in which Garayua played the lead role of Margie Fuentes, was nominated for 2013 Best Webseries in the "Drama" Category. The show was also nominated in 2014 to the Best WebSeries in 3 categories, "Drama", "Comedy", and "Reality or Informational.

Gloria won the award for “Best Supporting Actress” at the Houston Comedy Film Festival in 2016 for her work as “Talula” in the feature film “Driving While Black”.

== Other endeavors ==
Garayua has worked as a private acting coach in the Los Angeles area since 2005. She has also taught “Beginning and Intermediate Drama” at the Los Angeles Unified School District's “Gifted and Talented Fine Arts Conservatory", “Adult Beginner’s Scene Study” at “The Mauricio Ochmann Studio” in North Hollywood, “Advanced On-Camera Technique” at “Actor Training in LA” in North Hollywood, and “Teen Scene Study” at the “John D’Aquino’s Acting Studio” in Toluca Lake.

Garayua plays beginner piano, sings Mezzo-soprano, and is an intermediate dancer in Jazz and various Latin styles.

Gloria has added teaching acting as an adjunct professor at the University level to her teaching resume. For one academic year, she taught Intermediate Scene Study for the Stage, Intermediate and Advanced Scene Study for the camera, and Acting for Non-Majors at Azusa Pacific University. She also taught “On-Camera Scene Study” one semester for the MFA students at CAL State LA. Additionally, she has taught “Fundamentals of Acting” at El Camino College.

In addition to her private coaching business, Gloria produced an online course for beginning actors of all ages called “Acting for True Beginners”.

== Filmography ==
=== Film ===
Year	Title	Role	Notes
2005	Fun with Dick and Jane	Blanca	
2006	Foreign Currency	Dolores	Short
2007	Homeless Destiny	Mrs. Santiago	Short
2008	Henry Poole Is Here	Female Worshipper	
2009	Mother and Child	Melissa	
2010	Faster	Gospel Choir	
2011	Jen X	Cap	Short
2014	STFU! Stop Catcalling Anthem	Boss Lady	Short
2015	Cartwheels and Backflips	Ms. Rodriguez	Short
2015	I Am Gangster	Isabel Flores	
2015	Fair Warning	Woman	Short
2016	Driving While Black	Talula	
2016	Wake Up America!	Jimena	
2016	Unremarkable	Courtney	Short
2017	Oui Oui Wee Wee	Tinder Girl #1	Short
2017	Cattle Call	Peggy	Short
2019	Snoozefest	Oren's Mom	Short
2020	Four Good Days	Detox Receptionist	
2020	Tokyo Godfathers	Maria	

=== Television ===
Year	Title	Role	Notes
2004	NYPD Blue	Anna	Episode: "Great Balls of Ire"
2005	Joey	The Happy Woman	Episode: "Joey and the Moving In"
2005	The Shield	Concepcion	Episode: "Ain't That a Shame"
2005	Six Feet Under	Agnes	Episode: "Time Flies"
2005	Strong Medicine	Jasmine	Episode: "It Takes a Clinic"
2006	3 lbs	Lucy Canet	Episode: "Lost for Words"
2007	Cold Case	Vita Chacon	Episode: "A Dollar, a Dream"
2007–2010	Grey's Anatomy	Dr. Graciella Guzman	Recurring role (seasons 4–6)
2008	Weeds	Reyna	2 episodes
2008	Life	Rosa	Episode: "Crushed"
2008	ER	Gloria Ortiz	Episode: "The High Holiday"
2008	The Apostles	Berta	TV film
2009	Raising the Bar	Monica	Episode: "I'll Be Down to Get You in a Taxi, Honey"
2009–10	Seattle Grace: On Call	Dr. Graciella Guzman	Web series
2010	Desperate Housewives	Celia Solis (age 30)	Episode: "If..."
2010–11	Cougar Town	Rosa	2 episodes
2011	Imagination Movers	Carol the Elf	Episode: "A Little Elf Esteem"
2012	Shameless	Laurie	Episode: "A Bottle of Jean Nate"
2012	Castle	Jesse	Episode: "Once Upon a Crime"
2012–2014	Fixing Paco	Margie	TV series
2013	Bones	Carlene Blayney	Episode: "The Doom in the Gloom"
2013	Southland	Reya Suarez	Episode: "Bleed Out"
2013	Rizzoli & Isles	Josie Garcia	Episode: "But I Am a Good Girl"
2014	Love That Girl!	Ava Lopez	Episode: "10.July.2014"
2014	Legends	Surveillance FBI #1	Episode: "Lords of War"
2014	NCIS: Los Angeles	Aminta	Episode: "Black Budget"
2014	Anger Management	Nikki	Episode: "Charlie and the Houseful of Hookers"
2015	Criminal Minds	Madison Young	Episode: "Rock Creek Park"
2016	The Fluffy Shop	Carmen	TV film
2016	Animal Kingdom	Krystal	Episode: "Stay Close, Stick Together"
2016	American Housewife	Nurse Chapel	Episode: "The Nap"
2016–17	How to Get Away with Murder	Det. Brianna Davis	Recurring role (season 3)
2017	The Good Doctor	Sonia	Episode: "Not Fake"
2017	S.W.A.T.	Sofia	Episode: "Cuchillo"
2017	Bounty Hunters	Carolina	2 episodes
2019	Snowfall	Sophie	Season 3
2019	Reckoning	Cyd Ramos	10 episodes
2019	Fate/Grand Order - Absolute Demonic Front: Babylonia	Quetzalcoatl	English voice dubbing
2020	Badwater (TV Film)	Felicia Machado	
2020	Control Z		English voice dubbing
2021	Maid	Penny	Episode: "Sky Blue"
2021	Elize Matsunaga:Once Upon A Crime	Roseli de Araujo Camarotto	English voice dubbing (4 Episodes)
2022	9-1-1	Charity Nielson	Episode: "Red Flag"
2022	Cyberpunk: Edgerunners	Gloria	English voice dubbing
2023	Linked by Love	Dr. Margie Fuentes	5 Episodes
2024	Found	Sofia Diaz	Episode: "Missing While Presumed Dead"
2024	Thank you, Next	Esra	English voice dubbing (8 Episodes)
2024	Zorro	Nah-Lin	English voice dubbing (10 Episodes)
2024	Love & Translation	Jhennifer	English voice dubbing (13 Episodes)
