= Dirty Vegas =

English house music group

- Origin: London, England
- Genres: House
- Years active: 2001–2005; 2008–present
- Labels: EMI; Capitol; Parlophone; Om; Credence; Toolroom; Anjunabeats
- Members: Paul Harris; Steve Smith
- Past members: Ben Harris
- Website: www.dirtyvegas.com

Dirty Vegas are an English house music group initially made up of Ben Harris and Paul Harris (no relation to each other) on instruments and production and Steve Smith on vocals. The group formed in 2001, then broke up in 2005 before reforming in December 2008 to record new material.

They are best known for their international hit single "Days Go By", which gained mainstream popularity in a 2003 Mitsubishi Eclipse television commercial, and for remixing songs created by other artists.

== History ==
=== Early success ===
Dirty Vegas's debut release was the single "Days Go By." It originally made the top 30 in 2001, but when reissued in 2002 reached the top 20 in the UK. They released their self-titled debut album in June 2002 and a second album, One, in 2004.

The song "Days Go By", from their eponymous first album, gained wide exposure in the US when it was used in a 2003 Mitsubishi Eclipse commercial. The song went on to win the 2003 Grammy Award for Best Dance Recording.

They have remixed songs for artists such as Justin Timberlake and Madonna.

=== Present day ===
The group played their last concert together in May 2005. After the band's breakup, Smith released his first solo album This Town on 18 February 2008, on his own G.A.S. Records label. During their hiatus from the public, they began working on the film score for Boys & Girls Guide to Getting Down.

After four years, Paul Harris and Steve Smith decided to reform and returned with their third studio album Electric Love in April 2011. In April 2013, the band released the EP Let the Night, which reached #4 in US iTunes Dance Album chart and gained Gold status in Italy. Their fourth and latest studio album, entitled Photograph, was released via iTunes in September 2015. "Days Go By" was featured on the video game Grand Theft Auto V's in-game radio.

=== Pop culture ===
The band has also appeared on a variety of television shows such as FOX television's drama Standoff, where "Late Nights and Street Fights" was used as the show's theme song, FOX's The O.C. where "Closer" appeared in episode 32 entitled The SnO.C., and One Tree Hill where the single "Walk Into the Sun" appeared in episode 214. Dave Chappelle has parodied the Mitsubishi Eclipse television commercial, the song "Never Enough" from Electric Love also play on the game Nike+ Kinect Training

== Awards and nominations ==
Award	Year	Nominee(s)	Category	Result	Ref.
BMI London Awards	2003	"Days Go By"	Pop Award	Won	
BMI London Awards	2003	"Days Go By"	Dance Award	Won	
BMI Pop Awards	2003	"Days Go By"	Award-Winning Song	Won	
Grammy Awards	2003	"Days Go By"	Best Dance Recording	Won	
Grammy Awards	2003	"Days Go By"	Best Short Form Music Video	Nominated	
International Dance Music Awards	2003	Themselves	Best Dance Artist - Group	Won	
International Dance Music Awards	2003	"Days Go By"	Best Dance Video	Won	
International Dance Music Awards	2003	"Days Go By"	Best Pop Dance Track	Nominated	
International Dance Music Awards	2003	"Days Go By" (Lucien Foort remix)	Best Underground Dance Track	Nominated	
MTV Video Music Awards	2002	"Days Go By"	Best Dance Video	Nominated	

== Discography ==
=== Studio albums ===
Title	Details	Peak chart positions		
Title	Details	UK	US	US Dance
Dirty Vegas	Release date: 4 June 2002; Label: Capitol; Format: CD	40	7	1
One	Release date: 18 October 2004; Label: Parlophone; Format: CD	—	—	7
Electric Love	Release date: 26 April 2011; Label: Om; Formats: download, CD	—	—	13
Photograph	Release date: 11 September 2015; Label: D-Vision; Format: Download	—	—	—
"—" denotes releases that did not chart.

=== Remix albums ===
- A Night at the Tables by Dirty Vegas Sound System (2003)
- The Trip (2003)
- Stealth Live! (2009)

=== Extended plays ===
- The Story So Far (2009)
- Electric Love Acoustic EP (2012)
- Let the Night (2014)

=== Singles ===
Year	Title	Peak chart positions								Album
Year	Title	AUS	CAN	IRE	NZ	SWI	UK	US	US Dance	Album
2001	"Days Go By"	67	6	28	27	97	16	14	1	Dirty Vegas
2002	"I Should Know"	—	—	—	—	—	—	—	31	Dirty Vegas
2002	"Ghosts"	—	—	—	—	—	31	—	—	Dirty Vegas
2003	"Simple Things"	—	—	—	—	—	—	—	—	Dirty Vegas
2004	"Walk Into the Sun"	—	—	—	—	—	54	—	1	One
2008	"Pressure"	—	—	—	—	—	—	—	—	The Story So Far
2009	"Changes"	—	—	—	—	—	—	—	—	The Story So Far
2009	"Tonight"	—	—	—	—	—	—	—	—	The Story So Far
2011	"Electric Love"	—	—	—	—	—	—	—	27	Electric Love
2011	"Changes"	—	—	—	—	—	—	—	19	Electric Love
2011	"Little White Doves"	—	—	—	—	—	—	—	38	Electric Love
2012	"Emma"	—	—	—	—	—	—	—	—	Electric Love
2015	"Let the Night"	—	—	—	—	—	—	—	—	Photograph
2015	"Setting Sun"	—	—	—	—	—	—	—	—	Photograph
2015	"Save a Prayer"	—	—	—	—	—	—	—	—	Photograph
2020	"Happening"	—	—	—	—	—	—	—	—	Non-album single
2024	"Believer"	—	—	—	—	—	—	—	—	Non-album single
"—" denotes releases that did not chart.

=== Songwriting and Production Credits ===
Year	Artist	Song	Album	Contributor(s)
1998	Recall 22	"Subimos Juntos (We Rise Together)"	Non-album single	Steve Smith
2007	2AM	"Lonely" feat. Lorie	Non-album single	Paul Harris
2007	Kylie Minogue	"In My Arms"	X	Paul Harris
2007	Kylie Minogue	"Stars"	X	Paul Harris
2007	Kylie Minogue	"I Don't Know What It Is"	X	Paul Harris
2008	Ladyhawke	"Better Than Sunday"	Ladyhawke	Paul Harris
2009	Bananarama	"Extraordinary"	Viva	Paul Harris
2010	Gabriella Cilmi	"Superhot"	Ten	Paul Harris
2012	Kylie Minogue	"Timebomb"	Non-album single	Paul Harris
2012	Kate Alexa	"Buttercup"	Infatuation	Paul Harris
2012	Jenifer	"La pudeur"	L'Amour et Moi	Paul Harris
2012	Ross Lynch	"Can You Feel It"	Just Dance: Disney Party 2	Steve Smith
2013	Havana Brown	"Naughty"	Flashing Lights	Paul Harris
2014	Mike Mago	"Outlines" with Dragonette	Non-album single	Paul Harris
2015	Florrie	"Too Young to Remember"	Non-album single	Paul Harris
2015	Aiden Grimshaw	"Virtually Married"	Non-album single	Paul Harris
2015	Lenno	"Fever" feat. Benson	Good Thing EP	Paul Harris
2015	Sigma	"Stay"	Life	Paul Harris
2016	Tritonal	"Waiting 4 U"	Painting with Dreams	Paul Harris
2017	Moncrieff	"Symptoms"	Non-album single	Paul Harris
2018	NCT	"Baby Don't Stop"	Empathy	Paul Harris
2018	Iiola	"Sickly Sweet"	Chrysalis EP	Paul Harris
2018	Oliver Nelson	"Talk" feat. Linae	Non-album single	Paul Harris
2018	Daniel Adams-Ray	"IRL"	IRL	Paul Harris
2018	Daniel Adams-Ray	"I'd Rather Live"	IRL	Paul Harris
2018	Boyzone	"Symphony of Hearts"	Thank You & Goodnight	Paul Harris
2019	Glenn Morrison	"A Better Man" feat. Aiden Grimshaw	Non-album single	Paul Harris
2019	Vigiland	"We're the Same" with Alexander Tidebrink	Non-album single	Paul Harris
2019	Moncrieff	"Ghost"	The Early Hurts EP	Paul Harris
2019	Cashmere Cat	"For Your Eyes Only"	Princess Catgirl	Paul Harris
2020	Alex Gaudino	"Remember Me" with Bottai feat. Blush and Moncrieff	Non-album single	Paul Harris
2020	Michael Calfan	"No Lie" with Martin Solveig	Non-album single	Paul Harris
2020	Lenno	"Us Kids"	Simple Magic EP	Paul Harris
2020	BT	"The War" with Iraina Mancini	The Lost Art of Longing	Paul Harris
2020	Jay Pryor	"Aside"	Non-album single	Paul Harris
2020	Kelli-Leigh	"Whiskey Midnight"	Can't Get Enough EP	Paul Harris
2020	Anabel Englund	"Underwater" with MK	Messing with Magic	Paul Harris
2020	Flynn	"Young"	One of Us EP	Paul Harris
2020	Twice	"Go Hard"	Eyes Wide Open	Paul Harris
2020	Steps	"To the Beat of My Heart"	What the Future Holds	Steve Smith
2021	Anton Powers	"Do Me Right" with Joe Stone	Non-album single	Paul Harris
2021	Moss Kena	"Let's Get Naked" with Korres	Non-album single	Paul Harris
2021	Purple Disco Machine	"Fireworks" feat. Moss Kena and The Knocks	Non-album single	Paul Harris

== Filmography ==
=== Musical scores ===
- The Boys & Girls Guide To Getting Down (2006)
- Goal! - The Movie Soundtrack (2005)

== See also ==
- List of number-one dance hits (United States)
- List of artists who reached number one on the US Dance chart
