= Mass appeal =

Mass appeal as a phenomenon of mass psychology may refer to:

- Argumentum ad populum, or "appeal to the masses"
- having a generally appealing or popular quality, see
  - Mass culture
  - Crowd manipulation
  - Influencer
  - Mass media
    - Influence of mass media
  - Fast food, etc.

== As a proper name ==
- Mass Appeal (play), 1980 play by Bill C. Davis
- Mass Appeal (film), 1984 screen adaptation of the play
- Mass Appeal (media), Manhattan-based magazine and media company
- "Mass Appeal" (song), hip-hop song by Gang Starr from the album Hard to Earn
- Mass Appeal: Best of Gang Starr, Gang Starr compilation album
- Massappeal, Australian hardcore punk band formed in 1985
