= Electric Love (Dirty Vegas album) =

Studio album by Dirty Vegas
- Released: 26 April 2011
- Genre: Pop rock; electronic
- Length: 37:08
- Label: HighNote; Om; Music Brokers
- Producer: Dirty Vegas; Simon Duffy; Julian Peake

Dirty Vegas chronology
One (2004)	Electric Love (2011)

Singles from Electric Love
- 1. "Changes" Released: 2009; 2. "Electric Love" Released: 2009; 3. "Little White Doves" Released: 2011; 4. "Emma" Released: 2012

Professional ratings
Review scores
Source	Rating
AllMusic	3.5/5 stars
PopMatters	6/10 stars

Electric Love is the third studio album by British electronica group Dirty Vegas. The album was met with positive reviews, and reached number 13 on the Billboard Dance/Electronic Albums chart.

== Critical reception ==
The album garnered positive reviews upon its release. An AllMusic review, written by Jon O'Brien, gave the album 3.5 out of 5 stars, praising the production and the group's wide variety of influences, which he felt included New Order, Bloc Party, The Killers, Paul Van Dyk, Gary Numan, Ultrabeat, The Smiths, and The Clash. AllMusic also notes Electric Love as the best Dirty Vegas album, designating it an "Album Pick".

Beat gave the album a positive review, feeling that the album could be "superficial" at times, but that the production and vocal performance "make it worth checking out."

Electric Love also received a positive review from John Garratt, writing for PopMatters, who felt that the album was superior to their prior efforts, particularly "One", which he called "alterna-slush." He went on to designate "Little White Doves", "Changes", "Electric Love", "Emma", and "Never Enough" as highlights, concluding that the group "rises to the occasion."

== Commercial performance ==
The album debuted at number 13 on the Billboard Dance/Electronic Albums chart; it was their first entry on that chart in nearly a decade.

== Track listing ==
Electric Love
No.	Title	Writer(s)	Length
1.	"Little White Doves"	Ben Harris; Paul Harris; Julian Peake	3:38
2.	"Changes"	B. Harris; P. Harris	3:34
3.	"Electric Love"	B. Harris; P. Harris; Peake	2:39
4.	"Emma"	B. Harris; P. Harris; Peake	3:48
5.	"Pressure"	B. Harris; P. Harris; Peake	3:18
6.	"Round and Round"	B. Harris; P. Harris; Peake	4:46
7.	"Today"	B. Harris; P. Harris	4:36
8.	"Never Enough"	B. Harris; P. Harris; Peake	3:14
9.	"Weekend"	B. Harris; P. Harris	3:44
10.	"21st Century"	B. Harris; P. Harris	3:51

== Charts ==
Chart (2011)	Peak position
US Dance/Electronic Albums (Billboard)	13
