= One (Dirty Vegas album) =

Studio album by Dirty Vegas
- Released: 18 October 2004
- Recorded: 2004
- Genres: House, electronic
- Length: 43:03
- Label: Parlophone
- Producer: Dirty Vegas

Dirty Vegas chronology
Dirty Vegas (2002)	One (2004)	Electric Love (2011)

Singles from One
- 1. "Walk Into the Sun" Released: 11 October 2004

One is the second album by British house music trio Dirty Vegas, released 18 October 2004 in the UK (see 2004 in British music).

== Release & promotion ==
On August 6, band member Steve Smith delivered an acoustic performance of several of the songs from the upcoming album.

The album was released by Capitol Records and Parlophone in Europe on 18 October 2004. A limited number of promotional two-record vinyl copies were also available. The album was later released in the United States, on 30 November 2004.

Ahead of the album's release in the States, a club and theater tour was announced. The tour included sixteen dates, starting in Washington, DC on 26 October.

== Critical reception ==
Professional ratings
Aggregate scores
Source	Rating
Metacritic	35/100
Review scores
Source	Rating
AllMusic	2/5 stars
Blender	1/5 stars
Filter	30%
The Guardian	1/5 stars
Now	2/5 stars
Paste	3/5 stars
Q	2/5 stars
Rolling Stone	1/5 stars
Stylus	F

One garnered generally negative reviews from music critics. At Metacritic, which assigns a normalized rating out of 100 to reviews from mainstream critics, the album received an average score of 35, based on 8 reviews, making it the worst-reviewed album of 2004.

Steve Lowe of Blender heavily criticized the group's AOR tracks filled with earnest lyrics and Richard Marx-like production, concluding that "If this exhaustingly awful album repeats its predecessor’s success, the world will seem more confusing than ever." The Guardian's Dorian Lynskey also panned the overall work of the album, "At best, it suggests Duran Duran indulging their U2 fantasies. At worst, the brain scrabbles for comparisons. The post-millennial Bruce Hornsby? Mike & The Mechanics go to Ibiza? Frontman Steve Smith delivers lyrics that he presumably made up on the spot in the voice of a man who rolls up the sleeves of his sports jacket. One's sole redeeming feature is that its title helpfully informs reviewers how many stars to give it."

AllMusic's David Jeffries said of the group in this album that "They're still dreamy and maudlin, and still not lyricists who will threaten Dylan, but the production is slick and hides the band's shortcomings." David Dierksen of PopMatters said that despite sounding like the group's self-titled debut, he praised the album's production for capturing their live performances and instilling a lot of energy and enthusiasm in the tracks, saying that "What Dirty Vegas has really accomplished with this release is a completely unpretentious piece of work designed to move folks who want nothing more than something fun and catchy to listen to. And bless ‘em for pulling it off because even the simplest pop can be botched." Brian Howe of Paste praised the group for its mixture of acoustics, electronica and orchestral music to craft tracks that contain multi-layered intricacies in their structures, concluding that "When so much music is so bleak, a little unlikely optimism might be a crucial palliative measure, rather than Pollyanna-ish head-burying, and it’s sanguinity that Dirty Vegas delivers in spades."

== Track listing ==
All lyrics are written by Dirty Vegas, except where noted.

No.	Title	Length
1.	"Roses"	4:07
2.	"Home Again"	4:46
3.	"Human Love"	5:19
4.	"Walk Into the Sun"	5:20
5.	"Closer"	3:30
6.	"A Million Ways"	5:09
7.	"Don't Throw It Away"	4:18
8.	"In This Life"	5:02
9.	"Given You Everything"	6:31
10.	"Save Me Now" (Dirty Vegas, Terry Ronald)	5:01

== Release details ==
The album was released in various countries in October and November 2004.

Country	Date	Label	Format	Catalog
United Kingdom	18 October 2004	Parlophone	LP	868 8461 / 7243 8 66846 1 5
United Kingdom	18 October 2004	Parlophone	CD	868 8462 / 7243 8 66846 2 2
Australia	25 October 2004	Capitol Records	CD	874 9552
Japan	3 November 2004	Toshiba-EMI	CD	TOCP-66332
United States	30 November 2004	Capitol Records	LP	CDP 7243 8 66846 5
United States	30 November 2004	Capitol Records	CD	CDP 7243 8 63743 5

== Charts ==
Chart (2004)	Peak position
US Dance/Electronic Albums	7
