= Dirty Vegas (album) =

Studio album by Dirty Vegas
- Released: 4 June 2002
- Recorded: October 2001
- Genres: House; trance
- Length: 60:33
- Label: Capitol
- Producer: Dirty Vegas

Dirty Vegas chronology
Dirty Vegas (2002)	One (2004)

Singles from Dirty Vegas
- 1. "Days Go By" Released: 7 May 2001; 2. "Ghosts" Released: 22 July 2002; 3. "Days Go By" Released: 12 August 2002 (reissue); 4. "Simple Things, Pt. 2" Released: 10 March 2003

Dirty Vegas is the debut album by British house music trio Dirty Vegas, released in the United States on 4 June 2002.

The album was successful in the United States, debuting at number 7 on the Billboard 200. It would spend 19 weeks on the chart and eventually going Gold. The album also spent 16 non-consecutive weeks at number-one on the Billboard Dance/Electronic Albums chart.

The album features the radio hit "Days Go By" which was also used in a commercial for the Mitsubishi Eclipse and in the video game, DDRMAX2: Dance Dance Revolution. The album artwork is done by American artist Richard Phillips.

== Background ==
Frontman Paul Harris had worked as a club DJ in Europe prior to forming Dirty Vegas, while Ben Harris worked at a Camden recording studio and Steve Smith was performing as part of a band called Higher Ground. After Higher Ground disbanded, Paul met Smith at a party in Switzerland; the two began performing together. Ben Harris later joined and the trio began to record songs together, the first of which was "Days Go By."

== Recording ==
The group released "Days Go By," and the song's striking video was seen by an executive who worked for Mitsubishi Motors. He tracked the group down and got permission to feature the song in an ad for the company. Following the song's licensing, the group returned to the studio to record more songs for a full-length album. Ben Harris commented to MTV that, when recording the album, they were "trying to not really fit anywhere," opting to attempt to create "something unique" instead. The group informed Billboard that they didn't have one specific songwriting strategy for the album: "Ben and I might get a chord sequence going, and then Steve may add the lyrics - or vice versa. We handle it from many different angles." The album's recording was completed in October 2001, shortly before the Mitsubishi ad began running.

== Critical reception ==
Professional ratings
Aggregate scores
Source	Rating
Metacritic	56/100
Review scores
Source	Rating
AllMusic	2.5/5 stars
Blender	2/5 stars
Entertainment Weekly	C+
The Guardian	3/5 stars
Pitchfork	4.4/10
Playlouder	3/5 stars
Q	3/5 stars
Rolling Stone	3/5 stars
URB	2.5/5 stars
The Village Voice	C

The album garnered generally mixed reviews from music critics. John Bush, writing for AllMusic, gave the album 2 and a half out of 5 stars, praising the album's production but criticizing the lyrics and Smith's vocals. John Aizlewood, writing for The Guardian, compared the album to Air and Everything But the Girl and singled out "7AM", "Throwing Shapes", "Candles", and "All or Nothing" as highlights. Music critic Robert Christgau praised the album's catchiness but commented that "Days Go By" didn't stand out on the album the way it did in the Mitsubishi advertisements.

== Release and commercial performance ==
The album was released in the US on 4 June 2002. The album debuted at number 7 on the US Billboard 200 with first-week sales of 64,000. It spent more than three months on the chart and eventually attained a Gold certification from the RIAA. The album also entered the Top 40 of the UK album chart.

== Track listing ==
All tracks written by Paul Harris, Ben Harris, and Steve Smith, except where noted.

1. "I Should Know" – 6:09
2. "Ghosts" – 5:18
3. "Lost Not Found" – 4:05
4. "Days Go By" (Victoria Horn, Smith) – 7:07
5. "Throwing Shapes" – 6:52
6. "Candles" – 3:12
7. "All or Nothing" – 4:55
8. "Alive" – 3:21
9. "7am" – 6:13
10. "The Brazilian" – 3:53
11. "Simple Things, Pt. 2" (Harris, Harris, Smith, Roger Waters) – 6:44
12. "Days Go By" (Acoustic) – 2:43

== Release details ==
The album was released in various countries in 2002.

Country	Date	Label	Format	Catalog
United States	4 June 2002	Capitol Records	CD	39986
Japan	4 September 2002	Toshiba-EMI	CD	TOCP-66102
Australia	16 September 2002	Capitol Records	CD	539 9852
United Kingdom	30 September 2002	Credence Records	CD	542 9992

== Charts ==
=== Weekly charts ===
Chart (2002)	Peak position
Scottish Albums (Official Charts)	46
UK Albums (Official Charts)	40
US Billboard 200	7
US Top Dance/Electronic Albums (Billboard)	1

=== Year-end charts ===
Chart (2002)	Position
Canadian Alternative Albums (Nielsen SoundScan)	72
US Billboard 200	161
US Top Dance/Electronic Albums (Billboard)	2

Chart (2003)	Position
US Top Dance/Electronic Albums (Billboard)	21

== Certifications ==
Region	Certification	Certified units/sales
United Kingdom (BPI)	Silver	60,000^{^}
United States (RIAA)	Gold	582,000
^{^} Shipments figures based on certification alone.
