= The Boys & Girls Guide to Getting Down =

- Film poster
- Directed by: Paul Sapiano
- Written by: Paul Sapiano
- Produced by: Hani Selim
- Cinematography: Roman Jakobi
- Edited by: Enrique Aguirre
- Music by: Dirty Vegas
- Release dates: June 25, 2006 (Los Angeles Film Festival); March 23, 2007 (United States)
- Running time: 92 minutes
- Country: United States
- Language: English

The Boys & Girls Guide to Getting Down is a 2006 American comedy film directed by Paul Sapiano. The film had its world premiere in the Guilty Pleasures section at the 2006 Los Angeles Film Festival on June 25, 2006. It was released in the United States on March 23, 2007.

== Plot ==
Part documentary, part narrative, part instructional format, the film aims to teach young inexperienced youth about all things involved with "getting down", while also pointing out some of the pitfalls associated with the party lifestyle.

== Cast ==
- Cricket Leigh as Bernice
- Kat Turner as Kate
- Selena Fara as Tiffany
- Natalie Taylor as Sarah
- Dominique Purdy as Jonny
- Benny Ciaramello as Orlando
- Steve Monroe as Bryce
- Michael Fitzgibbon as Andy
- Leyla Milani as Brittany
- Jeff B. Davis as Marty
- Juan Pacheco as Tony
- Brendan McNamara as Calum
- Davin Anderson as Peter
- Justin Cotta as Eugene
- Richard Blair as Daniel
- Pete Czechvala as Robert
- Navia Nguyen as June
- C.C. Sheffield as Rebecca
- Kate Gilbert as April
- Greg Studley as Greg
- Mario Diaz as John/Mario

== Release ==
The film had its world premiere in the Guilty Pleasures section at the 2006 Los Angeles Film Festival on June 25, 2006. It was released in the United States on March 23, 2007.

== Reception ==
On review aggregator website Rotten Tomatoes, the film holds an approval rating of 100% based on 5 reviews, with a weighted average rating of 7.2/10.

Robert Koehler of Variety stated that "[the film's] rough production values and flubbed comedy contrast with the amusing and plentiful voice-over narration and the dazzling graphic design that suggests Peter Max on ecstasy." Ted Fry of The Seattle Times wrote: "There are a few laughs, but most of the characters in the loosely connected series of sketches are such venal, vile creatures that it's hard to imagine identifying with them even on a jokey or cartoonish level."
