= Rome Streetz =

American rapper (born 1986)

- Born: Jerome Allen; November 18, 1986 (age 39); London, United Kingdom
- Origin: Queens, New York, US
- Genres: Hardcore hip hop, boom bap
- Labels: Griselda; Bad Influenyce; Mass Appeal

Jerome Allen (born November 18, 1986), known professionally as Rome Streetz, is an American rapper signed to Griselda Records.

== Biography ==
Allen was born on November 18, 1986, in London, to Jamaican parents. When he was an infant, they moved to Queens. He later moved back to London as a teenager. He grew up reading Donald Goines. His childhood nickname was "Rome Streetz", as he often roamed intercity New York; it later became his stage name.

Allen gained prominence following his 2019 release Headcrack, with producer Futurewave. In 2021, he signed to Westside Gunn's Griselda Records. His first album with Griselda and his most successful album, KISS THE RING, was released in 2022. In a 2025 Rolling Stone interview alongside producer Conductor Williams, he stated a sequel will never be released. In 2024, he released Hatton Garden Holdup, in collaboration with Daringer. A short film, Calculated Risk was also released. In 2025, he released Trainspotting, a collaboration with Conductor Williams. Named for the 1996 film, it received a mixed review from Pitchfork.

== Style ==
Allen's style are often described as "gritty" and "violent", being hardcore hip hop mixed with boom bap, with parts of grime of his British origins.

== Discography ==
Studio albums

- Streetz Keep Calling Me (2018)
- Noise Kandy 3: The Overdose (2019)
- Noise Kandy 4 (2020)
- Kiss the Ring (2022)
- Noise Kandy 5 (2023)
- Sock It 2 My Pocket (2026)

Collaborative albums

- Street Farmacy (with Farmabeats) (2018)
- Headcrack (with Futurewave) (2019)
- Joyería (with The Artivist) (2019)
- Kontraband (with Farmabeats) (2020)
- Death & the Magician (with DJ Muggs) (2021)
- Genesis 1:27 (with ANKHLEJOHN) (2021)
- Razor's Edge (with Futurewave) (2021)
- Coup De Grâce (with Ransom) (2021)
- Wasn't Built in a Day (with Big Ghost Ltd) (2023)
- Hatton Garden Holdup (with Daringer) (2024)
- Trainspotting (with Conductor Williams) (2025)
- Smuggled Narratives (with Imported Goodz) (2026)
- Manhunt (with Boldy James) (2026)

Mixtapes

- Rollin Stoned (2015)
- Work on the Arm (2015)

Collaborative mixtapes

- I Been Thru Mad Shit (with Complexx Productions) (2016)

Extended plays

- Narco Lingo (2017)
- Noise Kandy (2018)
- Noise Kandy 2: The Re-Up (2018)
- The Residue (2020)
- Brick Lesnar (with Stack Moolah) (2022)
- Buck 50 (with Wavy Da Ghawd) (2024)
