= Ghosts (Dirty Vegas song) =

Single by Dirty Vegas

from the album Dirty Vegas
- Released: 22 July 2002
- Length: 5:18 (album version); 4:07 (single edit)
- Label: Parlophone; Credence
- Songwriter(s): Ben Harris; Paul Harris; Steve Smith

Dirty Vegas singles chronology
"Days Go By" (2001)	"Ghosts" (2002)	"Simple Things" (2002)

"Ghosts" is a song by British house music band Dirty Vegas. Included on their 2002 self-titled debut, it reached number 31 on the UK Singles Chart following its release on 22 July 2002.

== Composition and style ==
The song was described as being "alt-leaning" and "uptempo" by Billboard. CMJ Music Monthly compared the song's style to that of the Pet Shop Boys.

== Release ==
The song was released as the second single from the group's debut album on 22 July 2002 as a CD single and two 12-inch singles. The CD single includes the radio edit as well as two remixes; the enhanced portion of the disc features the song's music video. "Ghosts" debuted on the UK Singles Chart at number 31 on the chart dated 3 August 2002, spending two weeks in the top 50 and three weeks in the top 75. A remix of the song was later featured on their remix album, A Night at the Tables.

== Music video ==
A music video for the song, featuring the trio in a car, driving past a body of water as people swim. Later in the video, the group is shown driving on desolate country roads. Singer Steve Smith, who is driving, receives a ticket from a police officer; Smith crumples up the ticket and drives on.

== Charts ==
Chart (2002)	Peak position
Scotland (OCC)	34
UK Singles (OCC)	31
UK Dance (OCC)	2
