= Jabee =

American rapper

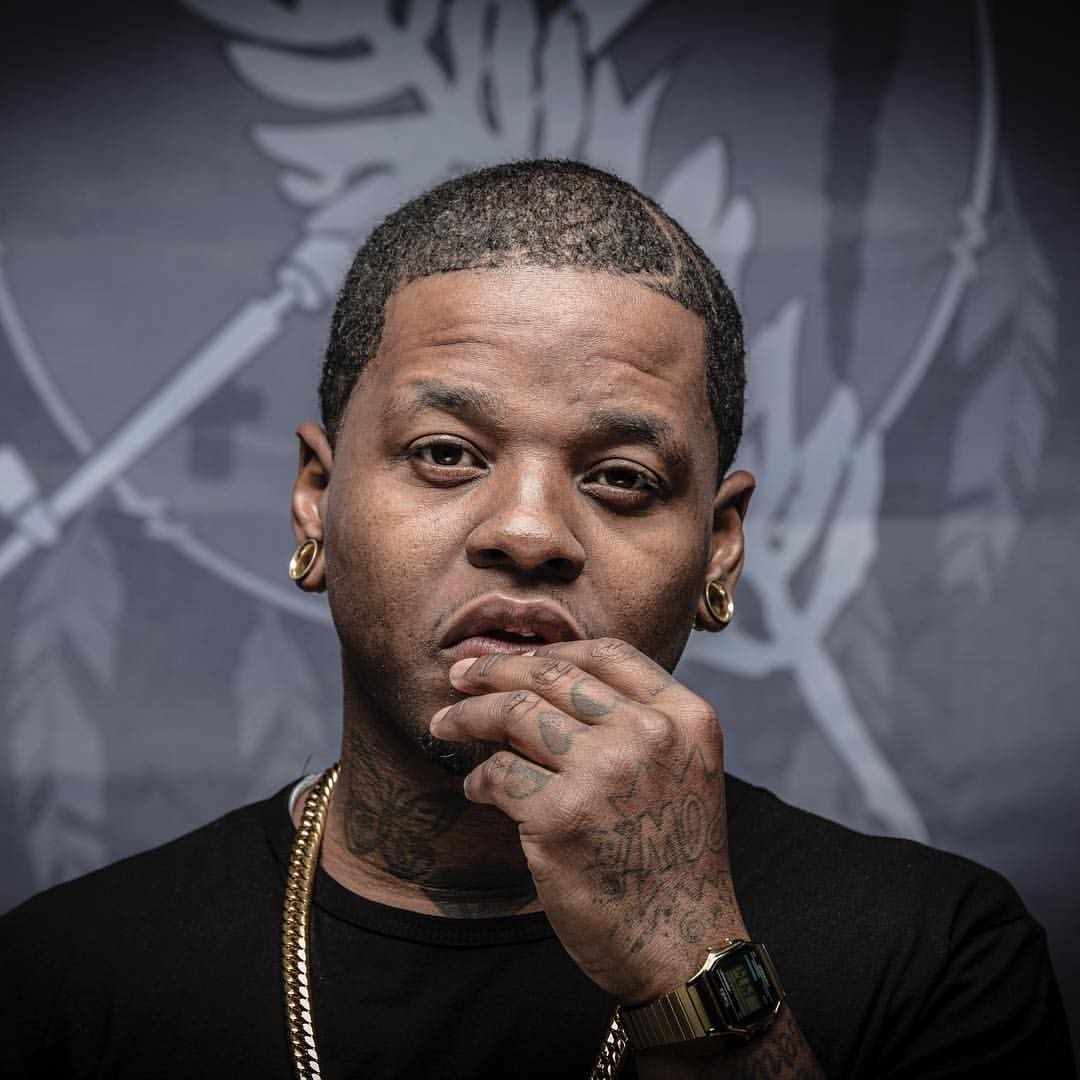
Emmy award-winning hip hop artist Jabee from Oklahoma City

Jonathan Blake Williams Jr. (born August 12, 1983), better known by his stage name Jabee, is a hip hop artist and actor from Oklahoma. His rhymes have been recognized by Chuck D of Public Enemy who has stated “Jabee's music has the potential to change the world” and Sway Calloway on Sway In The Morning. In 2014, his commercial work earned Jabee a regional Emmy.

== Early life ==
Jonathan Blake Williams Jr. (born August 12, 1983) to Monya Caraway and Jonathan Blake Williams Sr. Raised on the East side of Oklahoma City, Jabee began to rap at age seven. As a child, Jabee attended over 11 schools before graduating high school. He began performing onstage by the age of ten. During elementary school, Jabee's parents divorced. As a single mother, Caraway struggled to support her family at times which led to Jabee's family being homeless at age 12. In 2001, Jabee's brother was shot and killed, which motivated Jabee to take music seriously to help get his family out of turmoil.

At age 15 Jabee started recording his own music, which led to performing by the next year. In high school, Jabee began frequently performing at underground parties and raves with local DJs, who helped construct his first project at age 18.

== Career ==
=== Early career: 2006–2010 ===
Jabee would perform under aliases MC Jabee or Emcee Jabee, competing in freestyle cyphers and MC battles around Oklahoma and Texas. Artists that had significant influence on his style include 2Pac, Biggie Smalls, Get Boys, Lord Finesse, El-P and CamRon. Using his college laptop, Jabee created his first release, entitled Ijuswannamakesomemusic. Within that time, Jabee was signed to Bombcity Records.

In 2008, Bombcity Records and Illroots.com released Jabee's first EPtape, Songs For Debutantes featuring Emcee Hype and DJ Vadim. The tape gained prominence on the internet, leading to being featured as one of URB Magazine's 2008 Next 1000.

During 2009, DJ Vadim would mail Jabee beats to rap over. The team produced and created Jabee's next album, "Blood is the New Black" under Little Mafia Records. As buzz began to generate over the internet, Jabee went on to be featured on the Boondocks Season 3 Mixtape.

During 2010, Jabee left Little Mafia Records with intent to expand on an Indie level. He released "Must Be Nice: Hosted by Mick Boogie" while also headlining shows around the Midwest region.

=== Later career: 2011–present ===
During the 2011 NBA Lockout, Oklahoma City Thunder player Kevin Durant hosted an All-Star Charity Game where Jabee performed during halftime. During this time, Jabee performed most of his work off his 2011 EP, "Lucky Me." While working as an independent artist, Jabee released two EPs with record producer Thelonious Martin: "As It Is In Heaven" (2012) and "Deliver Us From Evil" (2013).

In 2013, Jabee worked with El-P to produce a 7" vinyl under Little Mafia & Fat Beats Distro. The single, entitled "Stephanie (Super Ugly)" featured Carlittla Durand on vocals and recollects memories from his childhood. The song came from an insult hurled at Jabee by a middle school crush when he was 11 years old. With connections gained with El-P, Jabee joined on Run The Jewels' Summer 2013 Tour with acts Despot and Kool A.D.

During the tour, Jabee was introduced to rapper Murs' assistant, who believed Jabee would be a perfect candidate for Murs' upcoming label, MURS 3:16. After being signed, Jabee released his album "Everything Was Beautiful and Nothing Hurt." The album debuted at #50 on iTunes charts and premiered on Complex. After releasing the album, Jabee made appearances on Toca Tuesdays with DJ Tony Touch as well as Showoff Radio with Statik Selektah on Shade 45. During this time, Jabee's track "Ghetto" was featured on Public Enemy Chuck D's Sirius station, where he was quoted saying "Jabee's music has the potential to change the world."

In 2014, Jabee was chosen to be interviewed by Oklahoma Mayor Mick Cornett, where he also assisted in filming music videos. During a downtown Oklahoma City upgrade campaign, Jabee's lyrics from the song "Cool (Streets of My City)" were posted amongst building walls. During this time, Jabee networked and performed at events such as South By Southwest. In 2014, Jabee had met Sway Calloway at SXSW and was offered a spot on Sway In The Morning. He has recently been awarded Best Rap / Hip Hop Artist of 2016 by the Oklahoma Gazette.

In 2016, Jabee began preparing for the release of his debut Grand Union Media label release, "Black Future." The album title derived from a poem written by Oklahoma City teacher and good friend Najah-Amatullah Hylton. The album features guest appearances from Killer Mike, Brother Ali, and Chuck D, as well as production from Statik Selektah, Hannabal King, and more. The album released August 12, 2016. The album track 'Monument' features Public Enemy's Chuck D and premiered on Billboard.

Since Jabee coordinated the release of Black Future with the first performing at the grand reopening of Oklahoma City's historic Tower Theatre, Jabee also released "Juneteenth," which was released on iTunes and given away for free to fans who preordered Black Future. The EP consisted of tracks and b-sides not included within the limited edition Black Future vinyl.

In fall 2016 following touring, Jabee will be featured as an honorary professor at the Academy of Contemporary Music @UCO, teaching a course on Hip Hop studies. In 2023 Jabee signed to Mello Music Group and released his debut "The Spirit is Willing but the Flesh is Weak" in 2024. WIth Production from Evidence, Conductor Williams, Marv Won and Apollo Brown.

==== Artist controversy ====
In 2014, Jabee was booked to perform a month in advance for "KSBI's Oklahoma Live". Unfortunately, the booker who was a third-party had booked Jabee even though rap music was not part of the shows demographic. The name “Jabee” was unfamiliar to the producer so he had no idea this was a rap artist until they arrived on set for a live show. The producer of the show asked them to leave—"due to an oversight of the booking agent". He was asked to leave without the planned performance or interview as the producer explained that he would not be on the show. Jabee began claiming racism which gained him sympathy and attention. The incident produced hundreds of tweets, reports and social media upload. The president of station Vince Orza immediately called and released a statement online apologizing for the incident and Jabee waited for the chaos to blow over.

In 2015, Jabee went to an Oklahoma mall to get a haircut before his Black History 2015 showcase. During his time at the mall, Jabee was surrounded by four security guards who criticized him for wearing a hoodie and accused him of filming with a camcorder. Inches away from the exit, Jabee was arrested and spent his evening behind bars. Incidents like this have helped Jabee write albums such as Black Future, based on experiences from his own life.

== Acting roles ==
In 2012, Jabee was featured in Danny McQuarin's "Skywriters" documentary as one of the directors favorite Oklahoma writers. During production, Jabee also helped in composing music for the film. Jabee began with additional cinematic roles when he was featured as the vocal and focal point for Nike's 2014 Kevin Durant commercial, "The Baddest." Following this commercial, Jabee was featured in a 2014 ad for the Science Museum of Oklahoma, entitled "What If?" The Science Museum of Oklahoma's commercial, Directed by Steve Jones in partnership with Funnel Design Group, helped Jabee win an Emmy. The Heartland Emmy was given to the team for Best Commercial Spot of 2014.

Jabee also had featured roles in 2015 as a juror in Gosnell: America's Biggest Serial Killer, and Heartland in 2016.

Jabee appeared in the 2020 Netflix release of Full Out 2 as announcer.

== Community Activism ==
Jabee has taken on the role of a local activist fighting to put a stop to systemic racism within Oklahoma. Jabee Williams lead a 131 mile march through rain and snow to bring attention and show support for Julius Jones who was convicted for murder in 2002 and sentenced to death row, but still claims that he is innocent.
