= Nicholas Craven =

Canadian record producer

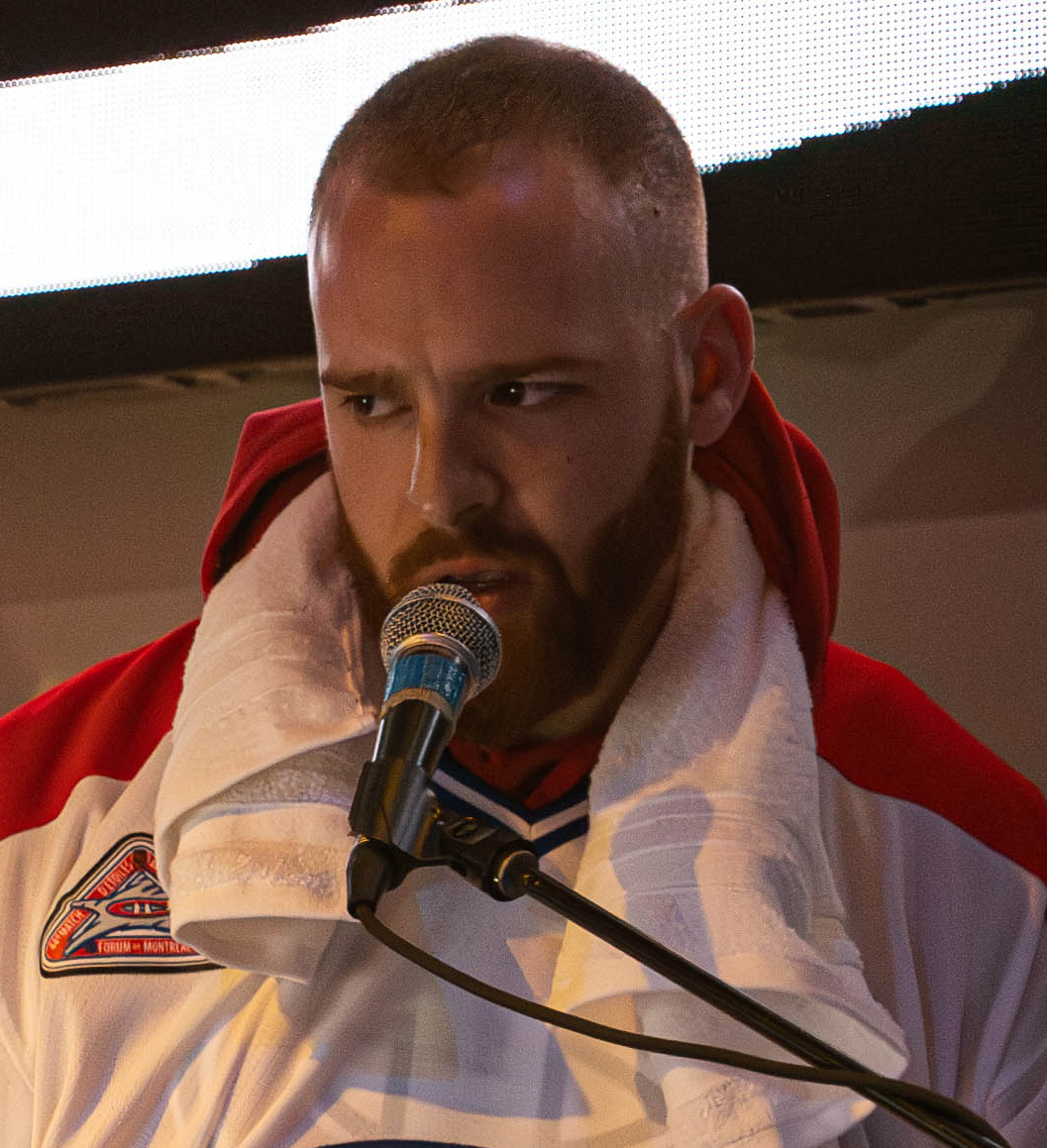
- Craven performing at S.O.B.'s, New York City, 2023

Background information
- Born: Nicholas Craven; Gatineau, Quebec, Canada
- Origin: Montreal, Quebec, Canada
- Genres: Hip-hop
- Occupation: Record producer
- Years active: 2014–present
- Label: Nicholas Craven Productions

Nicholas Craven is a Canadian record producer from Montreal, Quebec. He has worked with artists such as Roc Marciano, Billy Woods, Your Old Droog, and Navy Blue. He is also known for his work with Griselda artists such as Boldy James, Benny The Butcher, as well as their former associates, Conway The Machine, and Mach-Hommy.

== Early life ==
Craven was born and raised in Gatineau, a Western Quebec city near Ottawa, Ontario, which provided exposure to hip-hop at a young age. At first, Craven was "making punk rock music and listening mainly to Jimi Hendrix." When he was 13, he learned how to produce and sample from his friend's older brother. During his adolescence, Craven would attend local shows, collect vinyl records, and learn more about rappers such as MF Doom and Raekwon, sparking his love in hip-hop and producing.

== Musical style ==
With the inspiration of raw lyricism and soulful beats from artists such as J Dilla and A Tribe Called Quest, Craven adopted a melodious production style that rarely relied on drums. His musical style, which includes sample chops, is regarded as "fealty to the gritty sound of New York Hip-Hop."

== Discography ==
=== Studio albums ===
- Craven N (2017)
- Craven N 2 (2019)
- Craven N 3 (2022)

=== Collaborative projects ===
==== with Jimmie D ====
- Trout & Brussels Sprouts (2016)
- Light Work (2017)
- Good Man (2017)
- Rockhead Paradise (2018)
- Good Music Hypnotizes (2025)

==== with Tha God Fahim ====
- Dump Olympics Vol. 1 (2018)
- Tha Myth Who Never Quit (2019)
- Dump Gawd: Shot Clock King(2021)
- Dump Gawd: Shot Clock King, Vol. 2 (2021)
- Dump Gawd: Shot Clock King, Vol. 3 (2022)
- Shot Clock King 4 (2022)
- Tha Myth Who Never Quit 2 (2024)
- Tha Myth Who Never Quit 3 (2024)
- Dump Gawd: Hyperbolic Time Chamber Rap (2024)
- Dump Gawd: Hyperbolic Time Chamber Rap 2 (2024)
- Dump Gawd: Hyperbolic Time Chamber Rap 3 (2024)
- Dump Gawd: Hyperbolic Time Chamber Rap 4 (2025)
- Dump Gawd: Hyperbolic Time Chamber Rap 5 (2025)
- Dump Gawd: Hyperbolic Time Chamber Rap 6 (2025)
- Dump Gawd: Hyperbolic Time Chamber Rap 7 (2025)
- Dump Gawd: Hyperbolic Time Chamber Rap 8 (2025)
- Dump Gawd: Hyperbolic Time Chamber Rap 9 (2025)
- Dump Gawd: Hyperbolic Time Chamber Rap 10 (2025)
- Dump Gawd: Hyperbolic Time Chamber Rap 11 (2025)
- Ultimate Dump Gawd (2025)
- Dump Gawd: Hyperbolic Time Chamber Rap 12 (2025)
- Dump Gawd: Hyperbolic Time Chamber Rap 13 (2025)
- Dump Gawd: Hyperbolic Time Chamber Rap 14 (2025)
- Dump Gawd: Hyperbolic Time Chamber Rap 15 Final Explosion (2025)
- Dump Gawd: Hyperbolic Time Chamber Rap 16 (2025)
- Dump Gawd: Hyperbolic Time Chamber Rap 17 (2025)
- Dump Gawd: Hyperbolic Time Chamber Rap 18 (2025)
- Dump Gawd: Hyperbolic Time Chamber Rap 19 (2025)
- Dump Gawd: Hyperbolic Time Chamber Rap 20 (2025)
- Dump Gawd: Hyperbolic Time Chamber Rap 21 (2025)
- Dump Gawd: Hyperbolic Time Chamber Rap 22 (2025)
- Ultimate Dump Gawd 2 (2026)

==== with Ransom ====
- Director's Cut (2020)
- Director's Cut Scene 2 (2020)
- Director's Cut Scene 3 (2020)
- Deleted Scenes (2020)
- Crime Scenes (2020)
- Director's Cut 4 (featuring Autumn Nicholls, Che Noir, Talib Kweli, Raina Simone, Black Chakra, Nick Grant, King Shadrock, and Kxng Crooked) (2023)
- Deleted Scenes 2 (2023)
- Salvation For The Wicked (a collaboration with Boldy James, and featuring Young Chris and OT The Real) (2026)

==== with Boldy James ====
- Fair Exchange No Robbery (2022)
- Penalty of Leadership (2024)
- Late To My Own Funeral (2025)
- Criminally Attached (2025)
- Salvation For The Wicked (with Ransom) (2026)
- Trapper's Alley 3: Hell or High Water (2026)

==== with other artists ====
- Valenti & Rizzuto (with Eto) (2018)
- Habitants (with Vincent Pryce) (2018)
- Boulangerie (with Raz Fresco) (2022)
- Dump Gawd: Triz Nate (with Mach-Hommy) (2022)
- Latin Quarter, pt. 1 (with Akhenaton) (2022)
- Latin Quarter, pt. 2 (with Akhenaton) (2022)
- Hoop Dreams 2 (with J. Arrr) (2022)
- Shadow Moses (with Mike Shabb) (2023)
- YOD Wave (with Your Old Droog) (2023)
- Gia... À La Carte (with Raz Fresco & Estee Nack) (2023)
- Scottie Trippin (with TRAPMAT SAVIOR) (2026)
- Play With Something Safe (with Rosco P. Coldchain) (2026)
- Siberie (with Misa) (2026)

=== Instrumental Projects ===
- Jeudi & Françoise (2014)
- Art Dealing (2015)
- Lendemain & Françoise (2016)
- Monitors (2016)
- Sinaloa Stamps (2016)
- Kagemusha (2017)
- Aurevoir, Françoise (2017)
- Vendome (2017)
- Death Soul (2017)
- Necklace Craving (2017)
- Sleep Sessions Vol. 1 (5-14-2017, 2AM-7AM) (2017)
- Niko Bellic (2017)
- Art Dealing Pt. II (2017)
- Beatlemania (2018)
- The Land (2018)
- Chronicle of the Years of Fire (2018)
- Art Dealing Pt. III (2018)
- Manon (with KATA Fashion Company) (2018)
- Niko Bellic 2 (2018)
- Artisanal Hip-Hop (2019)
- La Valse (2019)
- The Early Years: 2007 - 2009 (2019)
- Diddy Bop (2019)
- Death Soul 2 (2020)

=== Remixes ===
- Invented The Remix (2016)
- Conway Remixes 1 & 2 (2018)
