= Jacques Agnant =

Haitian-born music executive

- Born: Haiti
- Other names: Haitian Jack; Nigel; Bullaman
- Occupations: Music executive; promoter

Jacques "Haitian Jack" Agnant is a Haitian-born music executive and promoter in the rap music industry. He has worked with several popular artists including Tupac Shakur, The Notorious B.I.G., Justin Rose, and Wyclef Jean. In 2007, he was deported from the United States.

== Life and career ==
Agnant's family migrated to East Flatbush, Brooklyn from Haiti. He became immersed in the street life by selling drugs during the crack epidemic of the 1980s and 1990s. Eventually, he became a club promoter. He was also involved with singer Madonna. Agnant managed various rappers and collaborated with Wyclef Jean, who is a paternal relative. He became friends with rapper Tupac Shakur. However, Agnant would be among those who Shakur accused of orchestrating the robbery at Quad Recording Studios in 1994 in his song "Against All Odds," in which Shakur was shot. The song specifically accused "Haitian Jack" of being a "snitch" who "promised to payback" Jimmy Henchman "in due time." Agnant denied that he had a role in the attack. Around this time, Agnant was hired Director of A&R by his friend Lance "Un' Rivera, CEO of the rap label Undeas Recordings. In 1999, Agnant was hired as security by music executive Steve Stoute, following an altercation in which Sean "Puff Daddy" Combs assaulted Stoute with a champagne bottle.

Following a conviction for a shooting in a Los Angeles nightclub in 2004, which led to prison time, Agnant was deported to Haiti in 2007. In 2015, it was reported that Benny Boom was set to direct a miniseries on the life of Haitian Jack. In 2021, Agnant was featured in the FX documentary Hip Hop Uncovered. He currently lives in the Dominican Republic.
