= Pray for Haiti =

2021 album by Mach-Hommy

- Cover artwork by Noah Leigh

Studio album by Mach-Hommy
- Released: May 21, 2021
- Genre: Underground hip-hop; jazz rap; experimental hip-hop
- Length: 39:19
- Label: Griselda; Daupe!
- Producer: Mach-Hommy (exec.); Westside Gunn (exec.); Camoflauge Monk; Cee Gee; Conductor Williams; Denny LaFlare; DJ Green Lantern; Messiah Muzik; Nicholas Craven; Sadhu Gold

Mach-Hommy chronology
Mach's Hard Lemonade (2020)	Pray for Haiti (2021)	Balens Cho (Hot Candles) (2021)

Pray for Haiti is the nineteenth studio album by Haitian-American rapper Mach-Hommy. It was released on May 21, 2021, through Griselda Records and Daupe!. Production was handled by Camoflauge Monk, Conductor Williams, Denny LaFlare, Cee Gee, DJ Green Lantern, Messiah Muzik, Nicholas Craven and Sadhu Gold, with Westside Gunn and Mach-Hommy serving as executive producers. It features guest appearances from Westside Gunn, Keisha Plum, Melanie Charles as well as Tha God Fahim and received universal acclaim from critics.

Mach-Hommy announced that 20 percent of the album's profits will be donated to the Pray for Haiti Trust Fund, which he set up to fund educational infrastructure in Haiti.

== Background ==
Mach-Hommy and Westside Gunn, though onetime collaborators and labelmates under Griselda Records, had fallen out of touch throughout much of the later 2010s. However, the pair reconciled late in 2020 and began to collaborate again. In an interview with Rolling Stone, Westside Gunn states that once the pair had reunited, "[w]e picked up where we left off. And from there, we said 'let's just kill this.'"

The album cover was designed by Noah Leigh, and is an imitation of the 1982 painting Untitled (Fishing) by Jean-Michel Basquiat, colloquially titled "Fishing". Leigh's design is identical to the original except the artwork has been flipped and the figure sports a Haitian flag bandana, similar to the one Mach-Hommy wears in public appearances.

== Critical reception ==
Professional ratings
Aggregate scores
Source	Rating
Metacritic	85/100
Review scores
Source	Rating
AllMusic	4/5 stars
Beats Per Minute	76/100
Exclaim!	8/10
HipHopDX	4.1/5
laut.de	4/5 stars
Pitchfork	8.8/10
RapReviews	8/10

The album was met with universal acclaim from music critics. At Metacritic, which assigns a normalized rating out of 100 to reviews from mainstream publications, the album received an average score of 85 based on eight reviews. The album has received particular praise for Mach-Hommy's lyricism. Paul A. Thompson of Pitchfork described the project as having "razor-sharp bars and an exceptional eye for detail", and gave it a "Best New Music" award. Riley Wallace of HipHopDX gave a similar appraisal, describing the album as "fram[ing] hard-as-nails themes with calmly delivered, tastefully complex wordplay", while Fred Thomas of AllMusic characterized Mach's lyrics as "cutting, hilarious, and multi-dimensional". The production on the album has been described as "varied" but generally "stripped-back".

=== Accolades ===
Year-end lists for Pray for Haiti
Publication	List	Rank	Ref.
Complex	The Best Albums of 2021	8	
Consequence	Top 50 Albums of 2021	36	
Exclaim!	Exclaim!'s 50 Best Albums of 2021	25	
The Fader	The 50 Best Albums of 2021	6	
NPR	The 50 Best Albums of 2021	18	
Paste	The 50 Best Albums of 2021	22	
Pitchfork	The 50 Best Albums of 2021	20	
Stereogum	The 50 Best Albums of 2021	47	

== Track listing ==
No.	Title	Producer(s)	Length
1.	"The 26th Letter"	Denny LaFlare	3:39
2.	"No Blood No Sweat"	Camoflauge Monk	1:54
3.	"Folie à Deux" (featuring Westside Gunn and Keisha Plum)	Conductor Williams	2:35
4.	"Makrel Jaxon"	Conductor Williams	2:01
5.	"The Stellar Ray Theory"	Conductor Williams	3:15
6.	"Marie"	Cee Gee	2:49
7.	"Leta Yo" (Skit)		0:34
8.	"Kriminel"	Nicholas Craven	2:36
9.	"Pen Rale"	Sadhu Gold	1:41
10.	"Murder Czn" (featuring Westside Gunn)	Camoflauge Monk	3:28
11.	"Magnum Band" (featuring Tha God Fahim)	Messiah Muzik	2:47
12.	"Rami" (featuring Westside Gunn)	Camoflauge Monk	2:28
13.	"Kreyol" (Skit)		1:06
14.	"Au Revoir" (featuring Melanie Charles)	DJ Green Lantern	3:48
15.	"Blockchain"	Camoflauge Monk	1:47
16.	"Ten Boxes / Sin Eater"	Denny LaFlare	2:50
