= Mach-Hommy =

Haitian-American rapper

- Also known as: Billy-Z, Dump Gawd, Dumpmeister, Dr. Olivier Champignons, Slim Doe La, Slime Doe La, Slime Dollars, Wavy Steezus
- Born: Port-au-Prince, Haiti
- Origin: Newark, New Jersey
- Genres: Alternative hip-hop; boom bap; underground hip-hop; jazz rap
- Occupations: Rapper; songwriter; record producer
- Years active: 2004–present
- Labels: Mach-Hommy, Inc.; Griselda
- Member of: 1. TheWinners, Kill Em All
- Website: www.mach-hommy.com zotanica.com

Mach-Hommy is a Haitian-American rapper and record producer. He is known for concealing his real name and face in all public appearances, a practice that has led him to be described as "one of hip-hop's most elusive artists".

Mach-Hommy has gained a cult following as a result of his work ethic and sense of mystery. His lyrics are often heavily related to the social and political history of his Haitian heritage. Though he predominantly raps in English, he also frequently incorporates Haitian Kreyòl into his lyrics. Mach-Hommy disallows his lyrics from being posted on lyric sites, describing such republishing as the sites "monetizing" his work; further, he charges hundreds and even thousands of dollars for his releases, many of which are not available on streaming services.

== Early life ==
Mach-Hommy was raised predominantly in Newark, New Jersey, but also spent much of his childhood in Port-au-Prince. His father was a folk guitarist, and Mach credits his father's musical style as an influence on his own. The first music Mach recorded was at the age of 13, when he performed a freestyle over the beat to Raekwon's "Verbal Intercourse".

In his early career, Mach found the music recording process to be an "unhealthy" environment and sought to take up filmmaking instead. However, at the encouragement of several Griselda members, he performed a verse for the song "Beloved", which motivated him to begin rapping again.

== Career ==
Mach-Hommy first received widespread attention after the release of his 2016 album, H.B.O. (Haitian Body Odor), which he sold via Instagram. Mach pressed only 187 copies of the H.B.O. CD and sold them for $300 apiece, before eventually uploading the album to SoundCloud in 2017. He released numerous other albums in the following years through services such as Bandcamp, many of which were never released on streaming services. One such album was 2017's The G.A.T... (or The G.A.T. (The Gospel According To...)), which attracted particular attention from collectors as it was only made available as a vinyl record priced at $999. The album sold at auction in November 2025 for $24,400.

In 2021, Mach-Hommy released his album Pray for Haiti on most streaming services. Mach stated that he would donate his share of profits from the album to the Pray for Haiti Trust Fund, a charity he established to fund educational services and institutions in Haiti. Pray for Haiti also brought Mach a greater level of attention from the music press, with Pitchfork honoring the album with a "Best New Music" award and Rolling Stone describing it as "a modern hip-hop classic".

Mach-Hommy has intermittently associated with the Griselda Records label. Though Mach was once considered part of the Griselda collective, he separated from them after a falling-out with Westside Gunn, and as of 2017 Mach-Hommy was unaffiliated with the label. Mach and Gunn eventually reconciled in late 2020, as Westside Gunn served as an executive producer of Pray for Haiti.

On May 17, 2024, Mach-Hommy independently released #Richaxxhaitian. The album contained features from Kaytranada, 03 Greedo, Roc Marciano, and Black Thought, among others. The album received positive reviews from critics.

Mach-Hommy would release his latest album "5786 AM: Easy Listen" in June 2026 with production from California producer Playa Haze. It would feature rappers Blu, Mavi, Doley Bernays, and Spank Nitti James.

== Personal life ==
In an interview with Billboard, Mach stated that he speaks every Romance language. He is also an avid fisher and hunter.

== Influences ==
Mach-Hommy cites a wide range of writers as influential upon him, including William Shakespeare, Chinua Achebe, George Orwell, Lorraine Hansberry, Fyodor Dostoevsky, and Dante. He also cites political and philosophical thinkers such as Malcolm X, C. L. R. James, Thomas Aquinas, and Friedrich Nietzsche. He cites Prodigy and Mobb Deep as musical influences.

== Discography ==
=== Studio albums ===
- Goon Grizzle (2004, re-released in 2017)
- F.Y.I. (2013, remastered in 2016)
- ETA: Greekfest (2015)
- HBO (Haitian Body Odor) (2016)
- Dump Gawd: Hommy Edition (2017)
- Dollar Menu 3: Dump Gawd Edition (with Tha God Fahim) (2017)
- Dumpmeister (2017)
- Luh Hertz (2017)
- The G.A.T... (The Gospel According To...) (2017)
- Bulletproof Luh (2018)
- Dump Olympics: Wide Berth (with Tha God Fahim) (2018)
- DUCK CZN: Chinese Algebra (with Tha God Fahim) (2018)
- Notorious Dump Legends (with Tha God Fahim) (2018)
- Tuez-Les Tous (with DJ Muggs as "Kill Em All") (2019)
- Wap Konn Jòj! (2019)
- Mach's Hard Lemonade (2020)
- Pray for Haiti (2021)
- Balens Cho (Hot Candles) (2021)
- Duck CZN: Tiger Style (with Tha God Fahim) (2022)
- Dollar Menu 4 (with Tha God Fahim) (2022)
- Notorious Dump Legends: Volume 2 (with Tha God Fahim) (2023)
- #RICHAXXHAITIAN (2024)
- 5786 AM: Easy Listen (2026)

=== EPs ===
- Back II the Future (2011)
- Supertape (Depth Cum in 3s) (2012)
- Uppity N***** (2012)
- #foreignOBJECTS (2013)
- iGRADE (January Mixtape) (2013)
- May Day (2013)
- #wellBREADUCATED (2013)
- Good Grease (2013)
- Good Bye Uncle Tom (2013)
- Don't Get Scared Now (with Westside Gunn and Conway the Machine) (2016)
- Dollar Menu (with Tha God Fahim) (2017)
- Dollar Menu 2 (with Tha God Fahim) (2017)
- The Spook... (with Knxwledge) (2017)
- Fete Des Morts AKA Dia De Los Muertos (with Earl Sweatshirt) (2017)
- Saturday Night Lights, Vol. 1 & 2 (2018)
- Dump Gawd: Triz Nathaniel (with Conductor Williams) (2022)
- Dump Gawd: Triz Nathan (with Sadhugold.) (2022)
- Dump Gawd: Triz Nate (with Nicholas Craven) (2022)
- Dump Gawd: Triz 9 (with Tha God Fahim) (2022)

=== Miscellaneous ===
- MHz (2017)
- No Chill 45 Series 001 (2020)
- No Chill 45 Series 002 (2020)
- No Chill 45 Series 003 (2022)
- Mach-Hommy (Self-titled) (2025)
- 3Peat Supertape (2025)
- EZ 5786AM (Cassette) (2026)

=== Guest appearances ===
- "Ice Cream" by Hus Kingpin (Hus Kingpin Meets Pro Era) (2014)
- "Beloved" by Conway the Machine (Reject 2) (2015)
- "Donna Karen" by Westside Gunn (Roses Are Red... So Is Blood) (2016)
- "King City" by Westside Gunn (FLYGOD) (2016)
- "Floor Seats" by the Alchemist (The Good Book, Vol. 2) (2017)
- "Btchs Bru" by Melanin 9 (Old Pictures) (2017)
- "52 Handblocks" by Al.Divino (DUMP GAWD: Divino Edition) (2017)
- "Carnies" by Armand Hammer (Rome) (2017)
- "Sell Me This Pen" by Evidence (Weather or Not) (2018)
- "Rare Paradigms" by Koncept Jack$on (The Tale Of Mutant Root) (2018)
- "Daddy Love You" by DJ Preservation (February 4th) (2018)
- "Windhoek" by Billy Woods (Terror Management) (2019)
- "RST", "Funeral March (The Dirge)" by Your Old Droog (It Wasn't Even Close) (2019)
- "Lies U Tell" by Koncept Jack$on (Thot Rap Vol. 1) (2019)
- "4N" by Earl Sweatshirt (Feet of Clay) (2019)
- "Wild Minks" by Quelle Chris (Guns) (2019)
- "Shamash", "BDE", "Desert Eagle" by Your Old Droog (Jewelry) (2019)
- "Save Me" by Kamaal Williams (Wu Hen) (2020)
- "Chimney" by Moor Mother and Billy Woods (Brass) (2020)
- "New Religion", "Uzbekistan", "Pravda" by Your Old Droog (DUMP YOD: Krutoy Edition) (2020)
- "Margiela Split Toes" by Westside Gunn (Hitler Wears Hermes 8: Sincerely Adolf) (2021)
- "Best Dressed Demons", "RIP Bergdorf" by Westside Gunn (Hitler Wears Hermes 8: Side B) (2021)
- "$payforhaiti" by Kaytranada (Intimidated) (2021)
- "Spin Off" by Big Cheeko (Block Barry White) (2022)
- "Double Layup" by Camoflauge Monk (Priye Pou Ayiti) (2022)
- "Let's Make A Deal" by Tha God Fahim (Iron Bull) (2023)
- "1000 HP", "Butter Levers", "Designer" by Tha God Fahim (Dump Gawd Reloaded) (2023)
- "Indeed" by Tha God Fahim (Dump Gawd: Tha Knocking Of Loose) (2023)
- "Completed Agreement" by Hit-Boy & Spank Nitti James (Yeast Talkin') (2025)
- "T.S.O.D." by Blu & Exile (Time Heals Everything) (2026)
