= Conductor Williams =

American record producer (born 1982)

- Also known as: Conductor; DWill; D! Williams
- Born: Denzel Williams; March 5, 1982 (age 44); Kansas City, Missouri, U.S.
- Genres: Hip-hop; East Coast hip-hop; boom bap
- Occupations: Record producer; songwriter
- Years active: 2008–present
- Labels: Conductor Williams Production; Griselda Records
- Website: conductorwehaveaproblem.com

Denzel Williams (born March 5, 1982), known professionally as Conductor Williams, is an American record producer known for his work with the musical collective Griselda. He has produced for rappers Westside Gunn, Conway the Machine, Boldy James, and Rome Streetz, as well as their former member and associate Mach-Hommy. He is also known for his work with other artists such as Drake, Tyler, The Creator, JID, J. Cole, and Joey Badass. His work on Leon Thomas' Mutt saw him place a Grammy nomination for Album of the Year and win an award for Best R&B Album at the 68th Annual Grammy Awards.

Williams is part of a hip-hop collective named "The Heartbreakers" which include fellow Griselda in-house producers Denny LaFlare and Camoflauge Monk. Prior to his music career, Williams worked as a railway conductor.

== Musical style ==
With the use of the Roland SP-606, Williams musical style is considered a blend of loop-heavy, vinyl-esque sample chops and gritty boom bap drums, which is said to add a sense of nostalgia and richness to his music production.

He is also known for intentionally incorporating elements of dissonance in his production, often choosing unconventional sounds to include as a part of his beats and distorting samples. Williams self-describes his musical aesthetic as "polarizing" and aims to garner intrigue among listeners above all else.

== Discography ==
=== Studio albums ===
- Listen to Your Body. Talk to Plants. Ignore People. (March 16, 2018)
- Positive Vibes Matter (April 2, 2020)
- Conductor We Have a Problem (March 3, 2023)
- Conductor We Have a Problem 2 (November 3, 2023)
- Conductor We Have a Problem 3 (October 31, 2024)

=== Collaborative projects ===
- Tomorrow is Forgotten (with Stik Figa) (August 5, 2020)
- Heavens to Mergatroyd (with Stik Figa) (November 27, 2020)
- Joyland (with Stik Figa) (November 12, 2021)
- Valley of Dry Bones (with Stik Figa) (October 14, 2022)
- Good (with Jabee) (December 16, 2022)
- Conductor Machine (with Conway the Machine) (December 1, 2023)
- Across The Tracks (with Boldy James) (June 28, 2024)
- Operation Flamethrower (with Rei the Imperial) (September 6, 2024)
- Trainspotting (with Rome Streetz) (May 30, 2025)
- Samy x Conductor (with Samy Deluxe) (September 4, 2025)
- The Uncomfortable Truth (with Ransom) (November 20, 2025)

=== EPs ===
- Ready. Aim. Beautiful. (June 25, 2014)
- Winter Forever Cries (January 27, 2019)

=== Singles ===
- "The Observer" (July 6, 2019)
- "Champion of The Mars League" (January 19, 2021)
- "Visualizer" (January 21, 2021)
- "Samo's Revenge" (August 26, 2022)
- "Black Star" (with Jabee and Scoopay) (November 25, 2022)
- "Indulgence" (with Jabee and Boldy James) (December 9, 2022)
- "Flame" (with Conway the Machine and 7xvethegenius) (September 29, 2023)
- "Mercury Thermometers" (with Your Old Droog) (May 17, 2024)
- "Terms And Conditions" (with Boldy James) (June 14, 2024)
- "Off-White Lumberjack" (with Boldy James) (June 21, 2024)
- "Flash" (with Solene) (July 5, 2024)
- "Baby Charmander" (with Rei the Imperial) (August 22, 2024)
- "Panduricane" (with Rei the Imperial) (August 29, 2024)
- "Get Away!" (with Rome Streetz) (October 18, 2024)
- "Ecstasy (Freestyle)" (with Russ) (October 25, 2024)
- "Rule 4080" (with Rome Streetz) (May 13, 2025)
- "For The Record" (October 3, 2025)
- "Bomaye" (with Ransom) (November 13, 2025)
- "Scary Merri" (with IDK.) (November 14, 2025)
