= Beat Butcha production discography =

The following list is a discography of production by Beat Butcha, an English hip-hop record producer and recording artist from London, England. It includes a list of songs produced and co-produced by year, artist, album and title.

== 2006 ==
=== Braintax - Panorama ===
- 1. "All I Need"
- 11. "Run the Yards"

== 2009 ==
=== Sha Stimuli - My Soul to Keep ===
- 9. "What's Wrong With That? (Wake Up the World)" (featuring Torae)

== 2010 ==
=== Danny Brown - The Hybrid ===
- 18. "Great Granddad"

=== Canibus - Melatonin Magik ===
- 13. "Beat Butcher Get Em'" (featuring Jaecyn Bayne, Son One & Chopp Devize)

== 2011 ==
=== Jehst - The Dragon of an Ordinary Family ===
- 5. "England"

=== Smoke DZA - Rolling Stoned ===
- 12. "Personal Party" (featuring Currensy) _{(produced with V Don)}

=== Lloyd Banks - The Cold Corner 2 ===
- 2. "Super Crack"

=== Willie the Kid - The Cure 2 ===
- 8. "Reign Supreme" (featuring Alicia Missy Gaskin)

=== Mobb Deep - Black Cocaine ===
- 1. "Dead Man Shoes" (featuring Bounty Killer)

=== Jet Life - Jet World Order ===
- 4. "The Set" (featuring Trademark Da Skydiver, Young Roddy and Smoke DZA)
- 12. "Elevated" (featuring Trademark Da Skydiver)
- 25. "Overhigh" (featuring Smoke DZA, Trademark Da Skydiver and Schoolboy Q) _{(produced with V Don)}

== 2012 ==
=== Prodigy - H.N.I.C. 3 ===
- 4. "My Angel" (featuring Willie Taylor)
- 12. "Skull & Bones"

=== Lloyd Banks - V.6: The Gift ===
- 9. "Chosen Few" (featuring Jadakiss)
- 12. "Money Don't Matter"

=== La Coka Nostra - Masters of the Dark Arts ===
- 5. "Electronic Funeral" (featuring Sean Price)

=== Xzibit - Napalm ===
- 1. "State of Hip-Hop vs. Xzibit"

=== Sean Price - Mic Tyson ===
- 14. "Battering Bars" (featuring Pumpkinhead)
- 15. "The Hardest Nigga Out"
- 16. "Let Me Tell You"

== 2013 ==
=== Juelz Santana - God Will'n ===
- 1. "Sho Nuff" _{(produced with Buda & Grandz)}

=== Killah Priest - The Psychic World of Walter Reed ===
- 22. "The Black Market" _{(produced with Ciph Barker)}

=== Lloyd Banks - F.N.O. (Failure's No Option) ===
- 6. "Paint the Sky" (featuring Vado)
- 12. "Tour Stories"

== 2014 ==
=== Mobb Deep - The Infamous Mobb Deep ===
- 5. "Timeless"

=== M.O.P. - Street Certified ===
- 3. "Hustle"

== 2015 ==
=== Jadakiss - Top 5 Dead or Alive ===
- 10. "Ain't Nothin New" (featuring Ne-Yo and Nipsey Hussle) _{(produced with Buda & Grandz)}

== 2016 ==
=== Lloyd Banks - Halloween Havoc 3: Four Days of Fury ===
- 13. "Charge It to the Game"

=== Lloyd Banks - The Blue Friday Series ===
- 1. "Misunderstood"

== 2017 ==
=== Prodigy - Hegelian Dialectic (The Book of Revelation) ===
- 3. "Broken Rappers"
- 9. "Snakes"
- 12. "Spiritual War"

=== Jet Life - Jet Life All Stars ===
- 1. "In Love with the Hustle" _{(sample only, produced by Don Cannon)}

=== Rick Ross - Rather You Than Me ===
- 13. "Maybach Music V" (featuring Dej Loaf) _{(produced with Buda & Grandz)}

=== Big Boi - Boomiverse ===
- 10. "Made Man" (featuring Killer Mike and Kurupt) _{(produced with Siege Monstrosity)}

== 2018 ==
=== Dave East - Paranoia 2 ===
- 14. "Never Been" (featuring Tory Lanez) _{(produced with Buda & Grandz and Joe Joe Beats)}

=== Cozz - Effected ===
- 4. "Demons N Distractions" _{(produced with Meez, Cardiak, Dontae Winslow, and Uncle Dave)}

=== The Carters - Everything Is Love ===
- 9. "Salud!" _{(produced with The Carters, Cool & Dre, and 808-Ray)}

=== Casanova - Commissary ===
- 8. "Why You Lie?"

== 2019 ==
=== Wiz Khalifa - Fly Times, Vol.1: The Good Fly Young ===
- 1. "Real As You Think" (featuring Problem and Currensy) _{(produced with Cardo)}

=== Benny the Butcher - The Plugs I Met ===
- 4. "Dirty Harry" (featuring RJ Payne and Conway the Machine) _{(produced with Daringer)}

=== Dave East - Survival ===
- 15. "Wanna Be a G" (featuring Max B)

=== Griselda - WWCD ===
- All tracks _{(produced with Daringer)}
  - 13. "Bang (Remix)" (featuring Eminem) _{(produced with Eminem)}

== 2020 ==
=== Mick Jenkins - The Circus ===
- 6. "I'm Convinced" _{(produced with DJ FU and C.H.O.P.)}

=== 2 Chainz & T.R.U. - No Face No Case ===
- 7. "G-Wagon" (produced with Zale)

=== Westside Gunn - Pray for Paris ===
- 3. "George Bondo" (featuring Conway the Machine and Benny the Butcher) _{(produced with Daringer)}

=== Nasty C - Zulu Man with Some Power ===
- 6. "La Vida Loca" _{(produced with G Koop)}

=== Conway the Machine - From King to a God ===
- 3. "Lemon" (featuring Method Man) _{(produced with Daringer)}
- 7. "Front Lines" _{(produced with Signalflow Music)}
- 9. "Seen Everything but Jesus" (featuring Freddie Gibbs)
- 11. "Spurs 3" (featuring Benny the Butcher and Westside Gunn)

=== Westside Gunn - Who Made the Sunshine ===
_{(All tracks produced with Daringer)}

- 1. "Sunshine Intro" (featuring AA Rashid)
- 2. "The Butcher and The Blade" (featuring Benny the Butcher and Conway the Machine)
- 3. "Ishkabibble's" (featuring Black Thought)
- 5. "Big Basha's"
- 7. "Ocean Prime" (featuring Slick Rick and Busta Rhymes)
- 8. "Lessie" (featuring Keisha Plum)
- 10. "Good Night" (featuring Slick Rick)

== 2021 ==
=== Griselda & BSF - Conflicted soundtrack ===
- 8. "3:30 in Houston" (featuring Benny the Butcher)

=== Logic - Bobby Tarantino III ===
- 8. "Stupid Skit" _{(produced with 6ix)}

=== Isaiah Rashad - The House Is Burning ===
- 1. "Darkseid" _{(produced with Devin Malik)}

=== Grip - I Died for This!? ===
- 5. "Momma Told Me!" _{(produced with TU!)}
- 6. "Placebo" (featuring Royce da 5'9") _{(produced with TU! and Willy Will Yanez)}
- 9. "A Soldier's Story?" _{(produced with Willy Will Yanez)}
- 13. "ConMan?" (featuring Ahyes) _{(produced with TU!)}
- 16. "Patterns?" _{(produced with Willy Will Yanez)}

== 2022 ==
=== Cordae - From a Birds Eye View ===
- 4. "Momma's Hood" _{(produced with Daoud, Sool Got Hits, and 1Mind)}

=== Conway the Machine - God Don't Make Mistakes ===
_{(All tracks produced with Daringer)}

- 1. "Lock Load" (with Beanie Sigel)
- 8. "Stressed" (with Wallo267)
- 11. "Babas" (with Keisha Plum)

=== The Cool Kids - Before Shit Got Weird ===
_{(All tracks produced with Chuck Inglish)}

- 1. "In the Mix"
- 5. "Pick Up on Line 6"
- 10. "It's Yours, Pt. 2"
- 11. "Strictly Business"
- 16. "Ridin' Clean" (featuring Nic Jr.)
- 17. "Lightwerk" (featuring JID and 6LACK)
- 19. "Triumph, Pt. 2" (featuring Pac Div and Don Cannon)
- 20. "Low Sodium" (featuring Chance the Rapper)
- 21. "Warm Handshakes"

=== Benny the Butcher - Tana Talk 4 ===
_{(All tracks produced with Daringer)}

- 2. "Back 2x" (featuring Stove God Cooks)
- 5. "10 More Commandments" (featuring Diddy)
- 10. "Guerrero" (featuring Westside Gunn)

=== Latto - 777 ===
- 6. "Like a Thug" (featuring Lil Durk) _{(produced with Dis and Coop the Truth)}

=== Dreamville - D-Day: A Gangsta Grillz Mixtape ===
- 1. "Stick" (with JID, Kenny Mason and Sheck Wes) _{(produced with Christo and AraabMuzik)}

=== Banks - Serpentina ===
_{(All tracks produced with Tālā)}

- 5. "Holding Back"
- 10. "Spirit" (featuring Samoht)

=== Brent Faiyaz - Wasteland ===
- 2. "Loose Change" _{(produced with Brent Faiyaz, No I.D., Paperboy Fabe, Raphael Saadiq, and Jordan Ware)}
- 4. "Heal Your Heart (Interlude)" _{(produced with Mike Blud)}
- 14. "Addictions" (featuring Tre' Amani) _{(produced with Brent Faiyaz and Jordan Ware)}

=== Black Party - Hummingbird ===
_{(All tracks produced with Willy Will Yanez)}

- 2. "She's Gone" _{(produced with Black Party)}
- 5. "On My Way" _{(produced with Black Party)}
- 7. "Down 4 Me"
- 9. "Flame" (featuring DMP Jefe and Zoe) _{(produced with Black Party)}

=== Smino - Luv 4 Rent ===
- 13. "Pudgy" (featuring Lil Uzi Vert) _{(produced with Chi Chi, Childish Major, and Daoud)}

=== SZA - SOS ===
- 18. "Far" _{(produced with Rob Bisel, Carter Lang, Los Hendrix, and Scum)}

== 2023 ==
=== Killer Mike - Michael ===
- 10. "Exit 9" (with Blxst) _{(produced with Willy Will Yanez)}

=== Dominic Fike - Sunburn ===
- 7. "Mona Lisa" _{(produced with Kenny Beats, StarGate and Willy Will Yanez)}

=== Doja Cat - Scarlet ===
- 4. "Fuck the Girls (FTG)" _{(produced with Kurtis McKenzie and Scribz Riley)}

=== Westside Gunn - And Then You Pray for Me ===
- 2. "Mamas PrimeTime" (featuring JID, Conway the Machine and Cartier A Williams) _{(produced with Mr. Green)}

== 2025 ==
=== Big L - Harlem's Finest: Return of the King ===
- 15. "Don And Sacha @ Inwood Hill Park (Closing Scene)" _{(produced with Biako])}

== 2026 ==
=== J. Cole - The Fall-Off ===
- 22. "What If" _{(produced with Tae Beast, T-Minus and Wu10)}
