= Conway the Machine discography =

This is the discography of American rapper Conway the Machine.

== Solo studio albums ==
| Title | Album details | Peak chart positions | | |
| Title | Album details | US | US Heat. | UK R&B |
|---|---|---|---|---|
| From King to a God | Released: September 11, 2020; Label: Griselda, Drumwork, Empire; Format: LP, digital download, streaming | 126 | 1 | — |
| God Don't Make Mistakes | Released: February 25, 2022; Label: Griselda, Drumwork, Shady, Interscope; Format: LP, digital download, streaming | 175 | 1 | 30 |
| Won't He Do It | Released: May 5, 2023; Label: Drumwork, Empire; Format: digital download, streaming | — | 7 | — |
| Slant Face Killah | Released: May 10, 2024; Label: Drumwork, Empire; Format: LP, digital download, streaming | — | 16 | — |
| You Can't Kill God with Bullets | Released: December 12, 2025; Label: Drumwork; Format: Digital download, streaming | — | — | — |

== Collaborative studio albums ==
- Lulu (with The Alchemist) (2020)
- Hall & Nash 2 (with Westside Gunn and The Alchemist) (2023)
- Palermo (with Wun Two) (2023)

== Commercial mixtapes ==
- Reject 2 (2015)
- G.O.A.T. (2017)
- Blakk Tape (2018)
- Everybody Is F.O.O.D. (2018)
- Eif 2: Eat What U Kill (2018)
- Everybody Is F.O.O.D. 3 (2019)
- Look What I Became (2019)
- La Maquina (2021)

== Solo mixtapes ==
- Welcome 2 the Badside (2007)
- The Transition (2007)
- Life on Mar$ (2008)
- T2: The Machine (2008)
- The Worst of Conway (2010)
- Welcome Back (2 da Badside) (2010)
- Amerikan Greed (2012)
- PhysiKal Therapy (2014)
- The Devil's Reject (2015)
- Greetings Earthlings (2022)

== Collaborative mixtapes ==
- Hall & Nash (with Westside Gunn as Hall 'N Nash) (2015)
- Griselda Ghost (with Westside Gunn as Hall 'N Nash, produced by Big Ghost LTD) (2015)
- Hell Still on Earth (with Prodigy) (2016)
- Reject on Steroids (with DJ Green Lantern) (2017)
- More Steroids (with DJ Green Lantern) (2017)
- Death by Misadventure (with Sonnyjim) (2018)
- Untitled Drums EP (with Imported Goods) (2018)
- Organized Grime (released in collaboration with Trillmatic Goods) (2019)
- No One Mourns the Wicked (with Big Ghost) (2020)
- If It Bleeds It Can Be Killed (with Big Ghost) (2021)
- Organized Grime 2 (released in collaboration with Trillmatic Goods) (2022)
- What Has Been Blessed Cannot Be Cursed (with Big Ghost) (2022)
- Pain Provided Profit (with Jae Skeese) (2023)
- Speshal Machinery (with 38 Spesh) (2023)
- Conductor Machine (with Conductor Williams) (2023)
- Chaos Is My Ladder 2 (with Ransom and V Don) (2024)
- I Heard You Paint Houses (with DJ Whoo Kid) (2026)

== Remix mixtapes ==
- Speshal Machinery: The Ghronic Edition (with Big Ghost) (2023)

== Compilation mixtapes ==
- 50 Round Drum (2016)
- El Patron (2016)
- Narcos (2016)
- Machinery, Vol. 1 (2016)
- The Missing Bricks (2021)
- The Machine, Bitch! (2023)

== With Griselda ==
- Don't Get Scared Now (2016)
- WWCD (2019)

== With Drumwork Music Group ==
- Hidden Drums (2023)
- Drumwork: The Album (2023)

== With Street Entertainment ==
- Who Wants What (2005)
- Bang Bang (2005)

== Music videos ==
| Year | Album | Title | Director | Featured artist |
|---|---|---|---|---|
| 2016 | Reject 2 | Rex Ryan | Mobile Kitchen Sound | Westside Gunn, Roc Marciano |
| 2019 | EIF2 : Eat What U Kill | G Money on the Roof | HDTV Flee Lord | Flee Lord |
| 2019 | EIF2 : Eat What U Kill | Overdose | Denzel Williams | |
| 2019 | Look What I Became | Tito's Back | Denzel Williams | Benny the Butcher, Westside Gunn |
| 2019 | Look What I Became | No Women No Kids | Denzel Williams | |
| 2020 | From King to A God | Lemon | Langston Sessoms | Method Man |
| 2020 | From King to A God | Forever Droppin Tears | Langston Sessoms | El Camino |
| 2020 | From King to A God | Jesus Khrysis | Slim Gus. The Video Shotta The Real Tony Dinero | |
| 2021 | La Maquina | Scatter Brain | n/c | Ludacris, JID |
| 2022 | John Woo Flick | John Woo Flick | Langston Sessoms | Benny the Butcher, Westside Gunn |
| 2022 | John Woo Flick | Stressed | n/c | Wallo267 |
| 2022 | John Woo Flick | Chanel Pearls | David X. Pena Chad Tennies | Jill Scott |
| 2023 | Won't He Do It | Quarters | Brucifix | n/c | Westside Gunn |
| 2024 | Slant Face Killah | Give & Give | n/c | Cool & Dre |
| 2024 | Slant Face Killah | Vertino | Gerard Victor | Joey Bada$$ |
| 2025 | You Can't Kill God with Bullets | Se7enteen5ive | n/c | |

== Guest appearances ==
| Year | Title | Album | Other performer(s) |
|---|---|---|---|
| 2008 | Trapping | Cocaine Cowboys | Benny the Butcher & 38 Spesh |
| 2015 | Hall & Nash | Hitler Wears Hermes 2 | Westside Gunn |
| 2015 | Bad News / John Starks | Hitler Wears Hermes 3 | Westside Gunn |
| 2016 | Hall & Nash 2 | Roses Are Red.. So Is Blood | Westside Gunn & The Purist |
| 2016 | Dunks | FLYGOD | Westside Gunn |
| 2016 | Free Chapo | FLYGOD | Westside Gunn |
| 2016 | Omar's Coming | FLYGOD | Westside Gunn, Roc Marciano |
| 2016 | Banjo | Tabernacle: Trust The Shooter | Royce da 5'9'', Westside Gunn, Styles P |
| 2016 | Loco | There's God and There's Flygod, Praise Both | Westside Gunn, Inkcredible Nes |
| 2016 | Midnite Xpress | HBO (Haitian Body Odor) | Mach-Hommy |
| 2016 | Basquiat on the Draw | The Easy Truth | Skyzoo, Apollo Brown, Westside Gunn |
| 2016 | Tom Ford Socks | My First Brick | Benny the Butcher, Westside Gunn |
| 2016 | Dirty Needles | My First Brick | Benny the Butcher |
| 2016 | 3 Missiles | My First Brick | Benny the Butcher, 38 Spech |
| 2016 | The Cow | Hitler Wears Hermes 4 | Westside Gunn |
| 2016 | Mr. Fuji | Hitler Wears Hermes 4 | Westside Gunn, Smoke DZA |
| 2016 | Nitro | Hitler Wears Hermes 4 | Westside Gunn, Benny the Butcher |
| 2016 | Machine, Man & Monster | A Fistful of Peril | CZARFACE |
| 2016 | The Curve | More Politics | Termanology |
| 2017 | 100,000 Machine Gunz | Hitler On Steroids | Westside Gunn, Royce da 5'9" |
| 2017 | Rex Ryan | Hitler On Steroids | Westside Gunn, Roc Marciano |
| 2017 | Miss You | Fantasy Island | The Alchemist, LNDN DRGS, Jay Worthy |
| 2017 | Rest in Piece | Return of the Don | Kool G Rap, Westside Gunn |
| 2017 | A Thousand Birds | The Good Book, Vol. 2 | The Alchemist, Budgie, Westside Gunn |
| 2017 | Came a Long Way | Anti-Hero | Termanology, Slaine |
| 2017 | Hashashin | Gems From The Equinox | Meyhem Lauren, DJ Muggs |
| 2017 | RIP Bobby | Hitler Wears Hermes 5 | Westside Gunn |
| 2017 | Satriale's | Butcher on Steroids | Benny the Butcher, DJ Green Lantern, Elcamino |
| 2017 | No. 8 | 8 | Statik Selektah, Westside Gunn, Termanology |
| 2017 | Bandit | Craven N | Nicholas Craven |
| 2018 | Loose Lips | The Big Pescado | Berner, Pusha T, Fresh |
| 2018 | Venetian Loafers | Glass | Harry Fraud, Meyhem Lauren |
| 2018 | Judas | Lunch Meat | The Alchemist, Westside Gunn |
| 2018 | Brutus | Supreme Blientele | Westside Gunn, Benny the Butcher |
| 2018 | Lucky Luciano | Springfield | Nuch |
| 2018 | All 70 | Tana Talk 3 | Benny the Butcher |
| 2018 | Ray Mysterio | Bread | The Alchemist, Westside Gunn |
| Mac 10 Wounds | The Alchemist | Bread | |
| 2019 | Nine on My Lap | Don't Eat the Fruit | Elcamino |
| 2019 | Eyes | Confessions Of A Crum Lord | Leaf Dog, Datkid |
| 2019 | Where You Know Me From | Gorilla Monsoon | NEMS |
| 2019 | To Whom It May Concern | El Capo | Jim Jones, Cam'ron, Guordan Banks, Benny the Butcher |
| 2019 | Dirty Harry | The Plugs I Met | Benny the Butcher, RJ Payne |
| 2019 | Thousand Shot Mac | Flygod Is An Awesome God | Westside Gunn, Hologram, Meyhem Lauren |
| 2019 | Pete Sake | Flygod Is An Awesome God | Westside Gunn, Benny the Butcher |
| 2019 | Acetone Wash | Medallo | DJ Muggs, CRIMEAPPLE |
| 2019 | Eastside | Yacht Rock 2 | The Alchemist, Westside Gunn |
| 2019 | Eastern Conference All-Stars | Retropolitan | Skyzoo, Pete Rock, Benny the Butcher, Elzhi, Westside Gunn |
| 2019 | Bullets | Statue of Limitations | Smoke DZA, Benny the Butcher |
| 2019 | Undertaker vs. Goldberg | Hitler Wears Hermes 7 | Westside Gunn |
| 2019 | Kool G | Hitler Wears Hermes 7 | Westside Gunn, Benny the Butcher |
| 2019 | The Rivington | Free Nationals | Free Nationals, Westside Gunn, Joyce Wrice |
| 2020 | Burn Clean | Flyest Nigga In Charge, Vol. 1 | Westside Gunn |
| 2020 | Russian Roulette | Funeral (Deluxe) | Lil Wayne, Benny the Butcher |
| 2020 | Made Men | Lucky 13 | Flee Lord |
| 2020 | Steppers | Prey for the Evil | Flee Lord, Mephux |
| 2020 | Doors Locked | No More Humble Fashion | Flee Lord |
| 2020 | Riviera Beach | The OutRunners | Currensy, Harry Fraud |
| 2020 | FUBU | The Allegory | Royce da 5'9" |
| 2020 | Pray | Oracle | Grafh |
| 2020 | 1/2 Ticket | The L.I.B.R.A. | T.I., London Jae |
| 2020 | Play Around | The Balancing Act | Statik Selektah, Killer Mike, 2 Chainz, Allan Kingdom |
| 2020 | CITY WE FROM | RUDEBWOY | CJ Fly |
| 2020 | George Bondo | Pray for Paris | Westside Gunn, Benny the Butcher |
| 2020 | Allah Sent Me | Pray for Paris | Westside Gunn, Benny the Butcher |
| 2020 | Babies & Fools | Alfredo | Freddie Gibbs, The Alchemist |
| 2020 | The Butcher & the Blade | WHO MADE THE SUNSHINE | Westside Gunn, Benny the Butcher |
| 2020 | 98 Sabres | WHO MADE THE SUNSHINE | Westside Gunn, Benny the Butcher, Armani Caesar |
| 2020 | War Paint | Burden of Proof | Benny the Butcher, Westside Gunn |
| 2020 | Get Money | Sell Sole II | DeJ Loaf, Benny the Butcher, Boldy James |
| 2020 | New Amerika | Noon Yung | A$AP Twelvyy |
| 2020 | Riviera Beach (Extended Clip) | Bonus Footage | Curren$y, Harry Fraud, Boldy James |
| 2020 | KILLA | THE HUSTLE CONTINUES | Juicy J |
| 2020 | Gucci Casket | THE LIZ | Armani Caesar |
| 2020 | All for the Goat | In The Name Of Prodigy | Flee Lord |
| 2021 | The People | The Fraud Department | Harry Fraud, Jim Jones, Marc Scibilla |
| 2021 | Outta Line | n\a | N.O.R.E., Method Man |
| 2021 | Hood Blues | Exodus | DMX, Westside Gunn, Benny the Butcher |
| 2021 | Shouts to the Mobb/Medusa | Delgado | Flee Lord & Roc Marciano |
| 2021 | Hundred Plus | Man with a Movie Camera | Josh Augustin, Benny the Butcher |
| 2021 | King Kong Riddim | The Harder They Fall OST | Jay-Z, Jadakiss, Backroad Gee |
| 2021 | The Ritual | Doe or Die II | AZ, Lil Wayne |
| 2021 | Spoonz | Hitler Wears Hermes 8: Sincerely Adolf | Westside Gunn |
| 2021 | Claires Back | Hitler Wears Hermes 8: Sincerely Adolf | Westside Gunn, Benny the Butcher, DJ Clue |
| 2021 | Distance | Chomp II | Russ, Ghostface Killah |
| 2021 | Pyrex Picasso | Pyrex Picasso | Benny the Butcher, Rick Hyde |
| 2021 | Fly With Me | Pyrex Picasso | Benny the Butcher |
| 2021 | Moving on Up | Unlearning, Vol. 1 | Evidence |
| 2021 | Hell on Earth, Pt. 2 | Hitler Wears Hermes 8: Side B | Westside Gunn, Benny the Butcher |
| 2021 | Pound For Pound | Gotti | Berner, Benny the Butcher, John Gotti, Mozzy, Styles P |
| 2021 | Keep My Spirit Alive | Donda | Kanye West, Westside Gunn |
| 2022 | Torch (Remix) | Diggin’ In The Tuff Kong Crates | Buckwild |
| 2022 | Olathe | Blame Kansas | Roc Marciano, Mephux, T.F |
| 2022 | Tyson vs. Ali | Tana Talk 4 | Benny the Butcher |
| 2022 | Triple Post Offense | Authenticity Check | Big Ghost Ltd, Jae Skeese, 7xvethegenius, D-Styles |
| 2022 | Tongpo | Cocodrillo Turbo | Action Bronson |
| 2022 | Menace | The Course of the Inevitable 2 | Lloyd Banks |
| 2022 | Helicopter Homicide | You Take the Credit, We’ll Take the Check | Jay Worthy, Harry Fraud, Big Body Bes |
| 2022 | Saltwater | Cheat Codes | Black Thought, Danger Mouse |
| 2022 | Red Pesto | Black Vladmir | Meyhem Lauren, Daringer |
| 2022 | Pandemic Flow | Long Live DJ Shay | Black Soprano Family, Rick Hyde, Cory Gunz |
| 2022 | Ghetto Prophets | U Wasn’t There | Cam'ron, A-Trak |
| 2022 | Soulja Boy | KISS THE RING | Rome Streetz |
| 2022 | El Puro | THE LIZ 2 | Armani Caesar |
| 2022 | Red Death | 10 | Westside Gunn, Benny the Butcher, Stove God Cooks, Rome Streetz, Armani Caesar, Jay Worthy, Robby Takac |
| 2022 | Slap | The Fuse Is Lit | Busta Rhymes, Big Daddy Kane |
| 2022 | Two 23's | Beyond Belief | 38 Spesh, Harry Fraud |
| 2023 | Suicide | Wasn't Built In a Day | Rome Streetz, Big Ghost Ltd, Lukey Cage |
| 2023 | Symmetry | Abolished Uncertainties | Jae Skeese |
| 2023 | Rain Fall | Art of Words | Grafh, 38 Spesh |
| 2023 | See How This Thing Goes | I Thought It'd Be Different | Rory, Hablot Brown |
| 2023 | Brainstorming | The Genius Tape | 7xvethegenius, DJ Green Lantern |
| 2023 | Ain't Too Much to It | Round Trip | Statik Selektah, Bun B, Ab-Soul |
| 2023 | Knock | BLISS | Tech N9ne, X-Raided, Joyner Lucas |
| 2023 | Painted Houses | Flying Objects | Smoke DZA, Flying Lotus |
| 2023 | Mamas PrimeTime | And Then You Pray For Me | Westside Gunn, JID, Cartier Williams |
| 2023 | Kostas | And Then You Pray For Me | Westside Gunn, Benny the Butcher |
| 2023 | Phil Drummond | Flying High, Part 2 | The Alchemist |
| 2024 | Griselda Express | Everybody Can't Go | Benny the Butcher, Westside Gunn, Rick Hyde |
| 2024 | Free Shots | Still Praying | Westside Gunn |
| 2024 | Still Praying | Still Praying | Westside Gunn, Stove God Cooks, Benny the Butcher, Boldy James |
| 2024 | Sticks & Stones | Not Now I'm Busy | Joyner Lucas |
| 2024 | Time | Stimulus Package 2 | Freeway, Jake One |
| 2024 | Diego Maradona | The Genuine Articulate | The Alchemist |
| 2024 | Switch (i) | Bravado + Intimo | IDK |
| 2024 | MiNt cHoCoLaTe | hella (˃̣̣̥╭╮˂̣̣̥) ✧ ♡ ‧º·˚ | 1999 WRITE THE FUTURE, BADBADNOTGOOD, Westside Gunn |
| 2024 | Funema | Sedicinoni | Jack The Smoker, Big Joe |
| 2024 | WHERE I'M FROM | By Any Mean$ | SAINT JAME$, Rome Streetz |
| 2024 | Pro Tro | Hatton Garden Holdup | Rome Streetz, Daringer |
| 2024 | Hidden in Plain Sight | Hidden in Plain Sight | Boldy James, whothehelliscarlo, Styles P |
| 2025 | The Same Day | The Same Day | V Don, Benny the Butcher |
| 2025 | Just Stay | Infinity | Smif-n-Wessun |
| 2025 | Impossible | The Outcome | Black Soprano Family, Jae Skeese, Rome Streetz |
| 2025 | Pick a Side | The Outcome | Black Soprano Family |
| 2025 | Curtis May | Supreme Clientele 2 | Ghostface Killah, Styles P |
| 2025 | Wild Corsicans | The Emperor's New Clothes | Raekwon, Westside Gunn, Benny the Butcher |
| 2025 | Money Magnet | Never Catch Us | Currensy, Harry Fraud |
| 2025 | Fear of God | Conversational Pieces | Boldy James, Real Bad Man |
| 2025 | Camel Eyes | PIFF | Lord Sko |
| 2025 | Walking on Business | At The Church Steps | Jim Jones, Keen Streetz |
| 2025 | Bellagio | Once Upon a Time | Jay Worthy |
| 2025 | Mick & Cooley | Goldfish | Hit-Boy, The Alchemist |
| 2025 | BLOODYMARY | FUNNY GAMES | Noyz Narcos, Sine, Jake La Furia |
| 2025 | God Mode | Dynamic Duos | Erick Sermon, The Game |
| 2026 | Brick by Brick | Gangsta Grillz: E.M.N.T - The Credits | The Game, DJ Drama, Mike & Keys, Benny the Butcher & JasonMartin |
| 2026 | Accelerant | The Good Part, Vol. 1 | Jae Skeese, ILL Tone Beats, Stove God Cooks |
| | "DON PISTOLA" | Heelmatic | Westside Gunn, Benny the Butcher |
| | "THE BASTARD PAC" | Heelmatic | Westside Gunn |
