= Daringer production discography =

The following list is a discography of production by Daringer, an American hip hop record producer and recording artist from Buffalo, New York. It includes a list of songs produced and co-produced by year, artist, album and title.

== 2012 ==
=== Westside Gunn – Hitler Wears Hermes ===
- 5. "Messhall Talk"

== 2015 ==
=== Conway the Machine – The Devil's Reject ===
- 1. "Coke on the Mirror" (featuring Westside Gunn)
- 2. "State Greens"
- 11. "Grind"

=== Westside Gunn – Hitler Wears Hermes II ===
- 2. "Hall & Nash" (featuring Conway the Machine)
- 3. "Eggz"
- 4. "Vera Boys" (featuring Keisha Plum)
- 6. "Medusa Plate"
- 7. "Eric B"
- 8. "Never Coming Homme" (featuring High Fashion P and Tiona D)

=== Westside Gunn – Hitler Wears Hermes III ===
- 2. "Flyy" (featuring Keisha Plum)
- 15. "John Starks" (featuring Conway the Machine)

=== Conway the Machine – Reject 2 ===
- All tracks

== 2016 ==
=== Westside Gunn – Flygod ===
- 1. "Dunks" (featuring Conway the Machine)
- 2. "Gustavo"
- 3. "Shower Shoe Lords (featuring Benny the Butcher)
- 6. "Free Chapo" (featuring Conway the Machine)
- 7. "Over Gold" (featuring Meyhem Lauren)
- 8. "Bodies on Fairfax" (featuring Danny Brown)
- 9. "Chine Gun"
- 11. "Omar's Coming" (featuring Conway the Machine and Roc Marciano)
- 15. "55 & a Half"
- 16. "Albright Knox" (featuring Chase)

=== Griselda – Don't Get Scared Now ===
- 1. "Chyna"
- 2. "Stovetops"
- 3. "Visionware"
- 4. "Bodies on Bodies (Interlude)"
- 6. "Benz Window" (featuring Prodigy)

=== Westside Gunn – There's God and There's Flygod, Praise Both ===
- All tracks

=== Mach-Hommy – HBO (Haitian Body Odor) ===
- 14. "Band Anna"
- 18. "Bloody Penthouse"

=== Westside Gunn and Conway the Machine – Hall & Nash ===
- 7. "Anybody"
- 8. "Pat La Fontaine"
- 9. "Hall & Nash"

=== Conway the Machine and Prodigy – Hell Still on Earth ===
- 1. "Rodney Little"
- 2. "Broken Safety"

=== Benny the Butcher – My First Brick ===
- 6. ".762"
- 9. "3 Missiles" (featuring Conway the Machine and 38 Spesh)

=== Westside Gunn – Hitler Wears Hermes 4 ===
- All tracks

== 2017 ==
=== Conway the Machine – Reject on Steroids ===
- 4. "Rick Boxes"
- 5. "Spurs" (featuring Benny the Butcher)
- 8. "Cooked in Hells Kitchen"
- 9. "Priest"
- 11. "Through It All"

=== Action Bronson – Blue Chips 7000 ===
- 11. "The Choreographer"
- 12. "Chop Chop Chop"

=== Westside Gunn – Hitler Wears Hermes V ===
- 1. "Hebru" (featuring Keisha Plum)
- 2. "Mac 15s"
- 4. "OG MA"
- 5. "Mickey Sunday"
- 6. "Down State" (featuring Benny the Butcher)
- 8. "RIP Bobby" (featuring Conway the Machine) _{(produced with The Alchemist)}
- 9. "Outro"

=== Westside Gunn and MF Doom – WESTSIDEDOOM ===
- 1. "Gorilla Monsoon"

=== Benny the Butcher – Butcher on Steroids ===
- 2. "Rivi"
- 5. "Satriale's" (featuring Conway the Machine and Elcamino)
- 9. "Change"

=== Hus Kingpin – Waves R Us ===
- 5. "Victims of Vogue" (featuring Westside Gunn)

=== Conway the Machine – G.O.A.T ===
- 1. "G.O.A.T"
- 3. "Th3rd F" (featuring Raekwon)
- 4. "Die on Xmas" (featuring Benny the Butcher)
- 5. "Rodney Little" (featuring Prodigy)
- 6. "Xxxtras"
- 7. "Bishop Shot Steel"
- 8. "Mandatory" (featuring Royce da 5'9")
- 9. "Arabian Sam's" (featuring Styles P)
- 10. "Bullet Klub" (featuring Benny the Butcher and Lloyd Banks)

== 2018 ==
=== 38 Spesh and Benny the Butcher – Stabbed & Shot ===
- 5. "2 Weapons"

=== Conway the Machine – Blakk Tape ===
- 1. "Night Drive"
- 2. "Puzo"
- 4. "Alpaca"
- 5. "Fish Fry"
- 6. "Rare Form"
- 9. "Pavement"
- 10. "God's Work"

=== Westside Gunn – Supreme Blientele ===
- 2. "Gods Don't Bleed" (featuring Jadakiss and Benny the Butcher)
- 3. "Dean Malenko"
- 5. "Amherst Station"
- 6 "RVD" (featuring Keisha Plum)

=== Kool G Rap and 38 Spesh – Son of G Rap ===
- 5. "G Heist"

=== Termanology – Bad Decisions ===
- 5. "Terminator & The Machine" (featuring Conway the Machine)
- 9. "Kaleidoscope" (featuring Smif-n-Wessun)

=== Conway the Machine – Everybody Is F.O.O.D. ===
- 1. "Bullet Holez in My Neck"
- 2. "Slapbox"
- 5. "ODB"
- 6. "Land o' Lakes" (featuring Busta Rhymes)
- 8. "Fat Freddy"
- 10. "212" (featuring Elzhi)
- 11. "Sigel in State Prop"

=== Westside Gunn – Hitler Wears Hermes 6 ===
- 3. "Versace Will Never Be the Same Again"
- 10. "Amherst Station 2"

=== Action Bronson – White Bronco ===
- 3. "Mt. Etna"
- 5. "White Bronco"

=== Benny the Butcher – Tana Talk 3 ===
- 1. "Intro: Babs" (featuring Keisha Plum)
- 2. "Goodnight"
- 3. "Scarface vs. Sosa, Pt. 2"
- 5. "Fast Eddie"
- 7. "Echo Long" (featuring Westside Gunn and Meyhem Lauren)
- 8. "'97 Hov"
- 9. "Joe Pesci 38"
- 10. "Who Are You?"
- 12. "Rick"
- 13. "Langfield"
- 14. "All 70" (featuring Conway the Machine)

== 2019 ==
=== Your Old Droog – It Wasn't Even Close ===
- 4. "Bubble Hill"

=== Flee Lord – Later Is Now ===
- 1. "Pops Skit"
- 10. "Later Is Now Outro"

=== Benny the Butcher – The Plugs I Met ===
- 3. "Sunday School" (featuring 38 Spesh and Jadakiss)
- 4. "Dirty Harry" (featuring RJ Payne and Conway the Machine)

=== Westside Gunn – Flygod Is an Awesome God ===
- 1. "Jul 27th" (featuring Raekwon)
- 6. "Thousand Shot Mac" (featuring Conway the Machine, Hologram, and Meyhem Lauren)

=== RJ Payne – Square Root of a Kilo ===
- 6. "Purge Night"

=== Conway the Machine – Look What I Became ===
- 4. "Tito's Back" (featuring Westside Gunn and Benny the Butcher)

=== Westside Gunn – Hitler Wears Hermes 7 ===
- 3. "Size 42"

=== Griselda – WWCD ===
- All tracks _{(produced with Beat Butcha)}

== 2020 ==
=== Westside Gunn – Pray for Paris ===
- 3. "George Bondo" (featuring Conway the Machine and Benny the Butcher)
- 7. "Allah Sent Me" (featuring Conway the Machine and Benny the Butcher)

=== Eto – The Beauty of It ===
- 5. "Guilty Interlude"

=== Flee Lord – Alter Ego Fleeigo Delgado ===
- 7. "It Ain't Gone Last"

=== Westside Gunn – Flygod Is an Awesome God 2 ===
- 1. "Praise God Intro" (featuring A.A. Rashid)
- 8. "Buffs vs. Wires" (featuring Benny the Butcher and Boldy James)

=== Conway the Machine – From King to a God ===
- 1. "From King"
- 3. "Lemon" (featuring Method Man) _{(produced with Beat Butcha)}
- 4. "Dough & Damani" _{(produced with The Alchemist)}

=== Action Bronson – Only for Dolphins ===
- 9. "Shredder"
- 11. "Marcus Aurelius"

=== Westside Gunn – Who Made the Sunshine ===
_{(All tracks produced with Beat Butcha)}

- 1. "Sunshine Intro" (featuring A.A. Rashid)
- 2. "The Butcher and the Blade" (featuring Conway the Machine and Benny the Butcher)
- 3. "Ishkabibble's" (featuring Black Thought)
- 5. "Big Basha's"
- 7. "Ocean Prime" (featuring Slick Rick and Busta Rhymes)
- 8. "Lessie" (featuring Keisha Plum)
- 10. "Goodnight" (featuring Slick Rick)

== 2021 ==
=== Griselda and BSF – Conflicted soundtrack ===
- 4. "Ain't Hit Nobody" (featuring Flee Lord, Eto, and Westside Gunn)
- 8. "3:30 in Houston" (featuring Benny the Butcher) (produced with Beat Butcha)

=== Tek – Pricele$$ ===
- 10. "The Machine and TEK" (featuring Conway the Machine)

=== Benny the Butcher and Harry Fraud – The Plugs I Met 2 ===
- 6. "No Instructions" _{(produced with Harry Fraud)}

=== Conway the Machine – La Maquina ===
- 11. "S.E. Gang" (featuring Westside Gunn and Benny the Butcher)

=== Evidence – Unlearning Vol. 1 ===
- 7. "Moving on Up" (featuring Conway the Machine)

=== Rick Hyde – Plates II ===
- 2. "Nova" (featuring Westside Gunn)

=== Westside Gunn – Hitler Wears Hermes 8: Side B ===
- 8. "Best Dressed Demons" (featuring Mach-Hommy)
- 12. "TV Boy"

== 2022 ==
=== Conway the Machine – God Don't Make Mistakes ===
- 1. "Lock Load" (featuring Beanie Sigel) _{(produced with Beat Butcha)}
- 4. "Drumwork" (featuring 7xvethegenius and Jae Skeese)
- 7. "John Woo Flick" (featuring Westside Gunn and Benny the Butcher) _{(produced with Kill)}
- 8. "Stressed" (featuring Wallo267) _{(produced with Beat Butcha)}
- 11. "Babas" (featuring Keisha Plum) _{(produced with Beat Butcha)}

=== Benny the Butcher – Tana Talk 4 ===
- 2. "Back 2x" (featuring Stove God Cooks) _{(produced with Beat Butcha)}
- 5. "10 More Commandments" (featuring Diddy) _{(produced with Beat Butcha)}
- 6. "Tyson vs. Ali" (featuring Conway the Machine)
- 7. "Uncle Bun" (featuring 38 Spesh)
- 10. "Guerrero" (featuring Westside Gunn) _{(produced with Beat Butcha)}

=== Action Bronson – Cocodrillo Turbo ===
- 1. "Hound Dog"
- 6. "Turkish" (featuring Meyhem Lauren)
- 10. "Storm of the Century" _{(produced with Yung Mehico)}

=== Rick Hyde – Stima ===
- 3. "Arrivederci"

=== Westside Gunn, Stove God Cooks, and Estee Nack – Peace "Fly" God ===
- 10. "Flip V Phil"

=== al.divino – Guns&Butter ===
- 12. "Whitechalk"

=== Meyhem Lauren and Daringer – Black Vladimir ===
- All tracks

=== Rome Streetz – Kiss the Ring ===
- 5. "Tyson Beckford"

=== Armani Caesar – The Liz 2 ===
- 5. "Mel Gibson"

== 2023 ==
=== Conway the Machine – Won't He Do It ===
- 02. "Brucifix" (featuring Westside Gunn)
- 03. "Monogram"
- 05. "Flesh of My Flesh"
- 09. "Kill Judas"
- 10. "Brick Fare"
- 11. "Brooklyn Chop House" (featuring Fabolous & Benny the Butcher)

=== Westside Gunn - And Then You Pray for Me ===
- 16. "Jalen Rose" (featuring Boldy James)

== 2024 ==
=== Conway the Machine - Slant Face Killah ===
- 08. "Meth's Back" (featuring Method Man, Flee Lord & SK da King)

=== Action Bronson - Johann Sebastian Bachlava the Doctor ===
- 01. "Splash (Provocativ)" (featuring Julian Love and Yung Mehico)
- 03. "Nourish a Thug"
- 04. "Hideo Nomo" (featuring Julian Love)
- 08. "Kompressor" (featuring Larry June)
- 11. "Doctor"

=== Rome Streetz and Daringer – Hatton Garden Holdup ===
- All tracks

=== 7xvethegenius - Death of Deuce ===
- 10. "The Genius" (featuring Keisha Plum)

=== Benny the Butcher & 38 Spesh - Stabbed & Shot 2 ===
- 12. "Internal Affairs" (featuring OT the Real)

=== Westside Gunn & DJ Drama - Still Praying ===
- 07. "Speedy 40"

== 2025 ==
=== Westside Gunn - 12 ===
- 04. "VEERT" (featuring Estee Nack & Stove God Cooks)
- 07. "Gumbo Yaya" (featuring Brother Tom Sos)

=== Benny The Butcher - Excelsior ===
- 04. "Money & Power" (featuring Skylar Blatt)

=== Benny The Butcher - Summertime Butch 2 ===
- 02. "Jasmine's" (featuring Westside Gunn)
- 03. "Hood On Fire" (featuring Bruiser Wolf)

=== Westside Gunn - Heels Have Eyes 3 ===
- 03. "Mankind" (featuring Stove God Cooks)
- 07. "R Truth"

=== Conway the Machine - You Can't Kill God With Bullets ===
- 07. "The Painter"

== 2026 ==
=== Action Bronson - Planet Frog ===
- 02. "Lebron Hennessy"
- 05. "Triceratops" (featuring Lil Yachty & Paul Wall)
- 06. "Peppers" (featuring Roc Marciano)
- 07. "Condor"
- 13. "Simone" (featuring Clovis Ochin)

=== Smoke DZA - Roadtrip to Amsterdam ===
- 06. "Irish Goodbye" (featuring Styles P)

=== Benny the Butcher - The Plugs I Met 2.5 ===
- 04. "Once Upon a Time"
