= Palermo (album) =

Studio album by Conway the Machine and Wun Two
- Released: December 22, 2023
- Genre: Hip-hop
- Length: 22:28
- Label: Vinyl Digital
- Producer: Wun Two

Conway the Machine chronology
Speshal Machinery (2023)	Palermo (2023)	Slant Face Killah (2024)

Wun Two chronology
Cashmere Dreams (2023)	Palermo (2023)	Hawaii & Snow (2024)

Palermo is a collaborative studio album by American rapper Conway the Machine and German record producer Wun Two. It features guest appearances from Kndrx and Goosebytheway. The album was released on December 22, 2023, through Vinyl Digital, peaking at number 19 on the German Albums Chart.

== Background ==
Demond Price, better known as Conway the Machine, is an American rapper from Buffalo, New York. He is a co-founder of the record label Griselda Records. Previously, he released From King to a God (2020), God Don't Make Mistakes (2022), and Won't He Do It (2023).

Palermo is his collaborative album with German record producer Wun Two. It consists of 10 tracks. It features guest appearances from Kndrx (on "Mind Tricks") and Goosebytheway (on "Cold Dish", "Montagna", and "Gaspare"). The album's title derives from Wun Two's Italian heritage.

The album was released on December 22, 2023, through Vinyl Digital.

== Critical reception ==
Professional ratings
Review scores
Source	Rating
Pitchfork	6.6/10
Spectrum Culture	60%
Sputnikmusic	3.0/5

A.D. Amorosi of Flood Magazine described the album as "a darkly clouded, overstuffed release that eats like a huge holiday meal after a maudlin family funeral." Dash Lewis of Bandcamp Daily wrote, "It's some of the weirdest, most beguiling production Conway's ever rapped on, and he responds by exploring the boundaries of form and arrangement." He added, "If anything, it's one of Conway's most exciting projects, proving that he's not keen to rest on his laurels, showcasing his appetite to push himself, and paving the way from good rapper to legacy artist."

Meanwhile, Thomas Stremfel of Spectrum Culture noted that "It's an obvious highlight for Wun Two if only for working with someone with the star power of Conway, but for the rapper, this scant batch of tracks essentially treads zero new lyrical ground." He added, "For most of Palermo, Conway sounds so at ease over Wun Two's beats that he never bothers to step outside that comfort."

== Track listing ==
Palermo track listing
No.	Title	Length
1.	"Interlude"	0:45
2.	"Carduni"	3:42
3.	"Mind Tricks" (featuring Kndrx)	1:53
4.	"Brick by Brick"	2:01
5.	"Cold Dish" (featuring Goosebytheway)	2:44
6.	"Cosca"	1:56
7.	"Zisa" (skit)	0:54
8.	"Montagna" (featuring Goosebytheway)	2:54
9.	"Bianca"	1:56
10.	"Gaspare" (featuring Goosebytheway)	3:38
Total length:		22:28

== Personnel ==
Credits adapted from liner notes.

- Wun Two – production
- Digitalluc – mastering
- Letizia Battaglia – front cover photography (Il gatto e il topo sazi della spazzatura)
- Giuseppe Licata – back cover photography
- Lukas Ratius – layout

== Charts ==
Chart performance for Palermo
Chart (2024)	Peak position
German Albums (Offizielle Top 100)	19
