= Bang (Conway the Machine song) =

Single by Conway the Machine and Eminem

from the album God Don't Make Mistakes (intended)
- Released: July 19, 2019
- Genre: Hip hop
- Length: 3:49
- Label: Shady
- Songwriters: Demond Price; Marshall Mathers; Eliot Dubock; Thomas Paladino; Luis Resto
- Producers: Beat Butcha; Daringer; Eminem; Luis Resto

Conway the Machine singles chronology
"Where You Know Me From" (2019)	"Bang" (2019)	"Dopebars" (2019)

Eminem singles chronology
"Remember the Name" (2019)	"Bang" (2019)	"The Adventures of Moon Man & Slim Shady" (2020)

"Bang" is a song by American rappers Conway the Machine and Eminem. It was released on July 19, 2019 through Shady Records as a non-album single despite being originally made for Conway's second studio album God Don't Make Mistakes. Production was handled by Beat Butcha and Daringer with Eminem and Luis Resto serving as additional producers. Its remix featuring Benny the Butcher and Westside Gunn appeared on Griselda's WWCD album.

== Track listing ==
No.	Title	Writer(s)	Producer(s)	Length
1.	"Bang"	Demond Price; Marshall Mathers; Eliot Dubock; Thomas Paladino; Luis Resto	Beat Butcha; Daringer; Eminem (add.); Luis Resto (add.)	3:49
Total length:				3:49

== Critical reception ==
Billboard called the collaboration between Eminem and Conway "explosive". HotNewHipHop said "The union between Shady Records and Griselda has manifested in apocalyptic fashion". XXL mentioned the song multiple times, saying the same thing all times: "it offers a plethora of bars" and its "a song that lives up to its own name".

== Commercial performance ==
The song only charted on one chart, despite the positive reviews. It reached number 16 on the Rap Digital Song Sales chart on August 3, 2019.
