= Sorry I'm Late (John Regan album) =

John Regan: Sorry I'm Late

Studio album by Culture VI
- Released: November 16, 2010 (U.S.)
- Recorded: 2008–2010
- Genre: Hip hop
- Length: 55:57
- Label: Culture VI Records
- Producers: Needlz, Nottz, 88-Keys, YZ, Dub B & The JYG

Professional ratings
Review scores
| Source | Rating |
|---|---|
| Hip Hop DX | 3.5/5 stars |
| Okayplayer | 7.5/10 stars |
| RapReviews | 8/10 stars |
| Couch Sessions | 3.5/5 stars |
| NQM Blog | 7.5/10 stars |
| Ill Vibes DMV | not rated |
| The Sermon's Domain | not rated |
| A Baltimore Love Thing | not rated |

John Regan: Sorry I'm Late is the debut album by American rapper John Regan. It was released by Culture VI Records on November 16, 2010 and distributed by Fat Beats Distribution. The album features collaborations with 6 Grammy Award winning and 10 multi-platinum selling musicians, having received over 880,000 paid song streams and purchases, to date.

The album was produced by YZ, Needlz, Nottz, 88-Keys and Dub B and features guest appearances by Marsha Ambrosius, Joell Ortiz, Skyzoo, Sha Stimuli, Naledge, Ill Bill, Wayna, Nottz, PackFM, James Gene Roston, Drew Hudson, Meylin, Nicholas Howard, and Juganot.

Wil Loesel and Yuri "YZ" Zwadiuk served as Executive Producers for the album, while Tony Dawsey of Masterdisk was the audio mastering engineer.

== Background ==
In November, 2010 when the album released it peaked at number #3 on Amazon's "Best Sellers - East Coast" charts, and #35 overall in Hip-Hop/Rap new releases. It is currently available on all major digital formats.

== Track listing ==
| # | Title | Producer(s) | Time |
|---|---|---|---|
| 1 | "Sorry I'm Late" | YZ | 3:52 |
| 2 | "Breath of Fresh Air" | YZ | 4:13 |
| 3 | "Yesterday" (featuring Joell Ortiz & Meylin) | YZ | 4:00 |
| 4 | "She Loves Me...Not" (featuring Drew Hudson) | Dub B & The JYG | 4:34 |
| 5 | "Nobody's Somebody" (featuring Nottz) | 88-Keys & Nottz | 3:30 |
| 6 | "All I Got to Give" (featuring Marsha Ambrosius) | YZ | 4:46 |
| 7 | "Paint the World" (feat. PackFM) | YZ | 3:41 |
| 8 | "She & H.E.R." | Needlz | 3:59 |
| 9 | "9:57 Interlude" | YZ | 3:44 |
| 10 | "Suicide Edicius" | Needlz | 3:14 |
| 11 | "One Day in Heaven" (featuring Skyzoo & Jaiden) | YZ | 3:35 |
| 12 | "Stars" (featuring Nicholas Howard) | Needlz & YZ | 5:13 |
| 13 | "Devil's Eye" (bonus) (featuring Ill Bill & Juganot) | YZ | 3:25 |
| 14 | "Up There with You" (bonus) (featuring Sha Stimuli, Naledge & Wayna) | YZ | 4:03 |
