= You Can't Kill God with Bullets =

Studio album by Conway the Machine
- Released: December 12, 2025
- Genre: East Coast hip-hop
- Length: 60:47
- Label: Drumwork
- Producer: Apollo Brown; AraabMuzik; Beat Butcha; Conductor Williams; Daringer; J.U.S.T.I.C.E. League; The Alchemist; Timbaland; Bonjour; Chri$$ianity; E. Jones; Elijah Hooks; JR Swiftz; Moo Latte; napes; Rhythm Paints; Sndtrak; Verzus

Conway the Machine studio album chronology
Slant Face Killah (2024)	You Can't Kill God with Bullets (2025)

Conway the Machine full chronology
Reject 3 (2025)	You Can't Kill God with Bullets (2025)

Singles from You Can't Kill God with Bullets
- 1. "Se7enteen5ive" Released: August 1, 2025; 2. "Diamonds" Released: November 21, 2025; 3. "BMG" Released: December 12, 2025

Professional ratings
Review scores
Source	Rating
RapReviews	8/10
Stereoboard	4/5 stars

You Can't Kill God With Bullets is the fifth studio album by American rapper Conway the Machine. It was released through Drumwork on December 12, 2025. The album features DJ Whoo Kid, G Herbo, Kndrx, Lady London, Roc Marciano, Tony Yayo and Heather Victoria. Production was handled by various producers including Apollo Brown, AraabMuzik, Daringer, J.U.S.T.I.C.E. League, The Alchemist and Timbaland.

== Background ==
On August 1, 2025, Conway the Machine released the lead single of the album, "Se7enteen5ive". He announced the album's title of the album alongside the release of its second single, "Diamonds", on November 21, 2025. On December 12, 2025, he released "BMG", the album's third single of the album.

== Track listing ==
You Can't Kill God with Bullets track listing
No.	Title	Writer(s)	Producer(s)	Length
1.	"Gun Powder"	Demond Price; Elijah Hooks	Elijah Hooks	1:57
2.	"The Lightning Above The Adriatic Sea"	D. Price; Erik Ortiz; Kevin Crowe	J.U.S.T.I.C.E. League	3:51
3.	"BMG"	D. Price; Chri$$ianity; Sndtrak	Chri$$ianity; Sndtrak	3:06
4.	"Diamonds" (featuring Roc Marciano)	D. Price; Rahkeim Calief Meyer; Denzel Williams; Zackery Wurdrow	Conductor Williams; DiZ	3:14
5.	"Hell Let Loose" (featuring Tony Yayo and DJ Whoo Kid)	D. Price; Marvin Bernard; Yves Mondesire; Williams; Brian Massaka Victorsson	Conductor Williams; Moo Latte	3:59
6.	"Crazy Avery"	D. Price; Timothy Zachery Mosley	Timbaland	1:47
7.	"The Painter"	D. Price; Thomas Paladino	Daringer	4:47
8.	"The Undying"	D. Price; Elijah Hooks	Elijah Hooks	1:52
9.	"Nu Devils" (featuring G Herbo)	D. Price; Herbert Randall Wright III; Abraham Orellana; Eliot Dubock	AraabMuzik; Beat Butcha	5:21
10.	"Otis Driftwood"	D. Price; Jayquawn Page; Rhythm Paints	JR Swiftz; Rhythm Paints	3:50
11.	"Mahogany Walls"	D. Price; Williams; napes; Bonjour	Conductor Williams; napes; Bonjour	3:44
12.	"Parisian Nights" (featuring KNDRX)	D. Price; Cory Andrew Kennedy; Eric Jones	E. Jones	3:50
13.	"Se7enteen5ive"	D. Price; Williams	Conductor Williams	3:02
14.	"Attached" (featuring KNDRX and Lady London)	D. Price; Cory Andrew Kennedy; Zaire Miylaun Stewart; Eric Jones	E. Jones	3:45
15.	"I Never Sleep"	D. Price; Erik Stephens	Apollo Brown	3:13
16.	"Hold Back Tears"	D. Price; Eliot Dubock	Beat Butcha	3:21
17.	"Organized Mess" (featuring KNDRX)	D. Price; Cory Andrew Kennedy; Alan Daniel Maman	The Alchemist	2:38
Total length:				57:13

Bonus track
No.	Title	Writer(s)	Producer(s)	Length
18.	"Don’t Even Feel Real (Dreams)" (featuring Heather Victoria)	D. Price; Heather Victoria; Sndtrak; Verzus	Sndtrak; Verzus	3:34
Total length:				1:00:47
