= Won't He Do It =

Won't He Do It may refer to:

- Won't He Do It (album), 2023 album by Conway the Machine
- "Won't He Do It", single by Koryn Hawthorne
