= So Help Me God! =

Studio album by 2 Chainz
- Released: November 13, 2020
- Genre: Hip hop · trap
- Length: 49:53
- Labels: Gamebread; T.R.U.; Def Jam
- Producers: 2 Chainz; Beatsbyjblack; Big Papito; Chief Keef; Cool & Dre; David Banner; Dem Jointz; Hendrix Smoke; Jay the Great; Joshua Ard; LilJuMadeDaBeat; Mike Dean; Mike Will Made It; Mondo; Playa Pizzle; RafMadeIt; Sean Solymar; StreetRunner; TM88; Yung Lan

2 Chainz chronology
No Face No Case (2020)	So Help Me God! (2020)	Dope Don't Sell Itself (2022)

Singles from So Help Me God!
- 1. "Money Maker" Released: August 7, 2020; 2. "Quarantine Thick" Released: November 6, 2020

Professional ratings
Aggregate scores
Source	Rating
Metacritic	68/100
Review scores
Source	Rating
AllMusic	3.5/5 stars
Beats Per Minute	75%
Clash	6/10
NME	3/5 stars

So Help Me God! is the sixth studio album by American rapper 2 Chainz. It was released on November 13, 2020, through Gamebread, T.R.U., and Def Jam Recordings. It features guest appearances from Brent Faiyaz, Chief Keef, Kanye West, Kevin Gates, Lil Duval, Lil Uzi Vert, Lil Wayne, Latto, Rick Ross, Skooly, Ty Dolla Sign and YoungBoy Never Broke Again.

== Background ==
In August 2020, following his Verzuz battle with Rick Ross, 2 Chainz announced that his upcoming sixth album would be titled So Help Me God. The album was originally set to be released on September 25, 2020, but it was delayed due to sample clearance issues.

The lead single, "Money Maker", featuring American rapper Lil Wayne, was released on August 7, 2020. The second single, "Quarantine Thick", featuring American rapper Latto, was released on November 6, 2020.

== Track listing ==
Credits adapted from Tidal.

No.	Title	Writer(s)	Producer(s)	Length
1.	"Lambo Wrist"	Tauheed Epps; Julian Mason; Tim Gomringer; Kevin Gomringer; Nicholas Warwar	LilJuMadeDaBeat; Cubeatz^{[b]}; StreetRunner^{[b]}	2:51
2.	"Grey Area"	Epps; Jay Williams	Jay the Great	2:51
3.	"Save Me" (featuring YoungBoy Never Broke Again)	Epps; Kentrell Gaulden; Michael Williams II; Samuel Gloade; Pierre Slaughter; Hasan Matthews	2 Chainz; Mike Will Made It; 30 Roc^{[b]}; P-Nasty^{[b]}	3:23
4.	"Money Maker" (featuring Lil Wayne)	Epps; Dwayne Carter, Jr.; Elvin Presley; Edward Riley; Aaron Hall; Timothy Gatling; Gene Griffin	Playa Pizzle	2:58
5.	"Can't Go for That" (featuring Ty Dolla Sign and Lil Duval)	Epps; Tyrone Griffin, Jr.; Roland Powell; Jimmy Stanford; Daryl Hall; John Oates; Sara Allen; Larry Blackmon; Tomi Jenkins; Kevin Kendrick; Nathan Leftenant	Beatsbyjblack	2:59
6.	"Feel a Way" (featuring Kanye West and Brent Faiyaz)	Epps; Kanye West; Christopher Wood; Michael Dean; Sean Solymar; Matthew Samuels	Mike Dean; Sean Solymar	3:33
7.	"Quarantine Thick" (featuring Latto)	Epps; Alyssa Stephens; Milan Modi	Yung Lan	3:10
8.	"Ziploc" (featuring Kevin Gates)	Epps; Kevin Gilyard; Derrick Miller; Armond Kendrick; Addison Rineer	Hendrix Smoke; Mondo; RafMadeIt	3:25
9.	"Free Lighter" (featuring Lil Uzi Vert and Chief Keef)	Epps; Symere Woods; Keith Cozart	Chief Keef	2:53
10.	"Toni"	Epps; Bryan Simmons; Lavell Crump; Wesley Weston; Chad Butler; Bernard Freeman; Barry White	TM88	2:58
11.	"Southside Hov"	Epps; Warwar; Shawn Carter; David Willis	StreetRunner	2:39
12.	"Vampire"	Epps; Marcello Valenzano; Andre Lyon; Joshua Ard	Cool & Dre; Joshua Ard	3:57
13.	"YRB" (featuring Rick Ross and Skooly)	Epps; William Roberts II; Kazarion Fowler; Papa Abdou Fall	Big Papito	4:03
14.	"Wait for You to Die"	Epps; Crump; Steven Thornton; Alan Lomax	David Banner; Swiff D^{[a]}	4:27
15.	"55 Times"	Epps; Dwayne Abernathy Jr.	Dem Jointz	3:39
Total length:				49:46

Notes

- ^{^[a]} signifies a co-producer
- ^{^[b]} signifies an additional producer
- Latto is credited as "Mulatto" on streaming versions of "Quarantine Thick" as a featured artist
- "Save Me" features additional vocals from BJ the Chicago Kid
- "Ziploc" features additional vocals from Desi Banks
- "Southside Hov" features background vocals from Sevyn Streeter
- "Vampire" features additional vocals from James Riley
- "YRB" features additional vocals from Big Rube

Sample Credits

- "Save Me" contains uncredited samples of "I Love You", as performed by Problem featuring BJ the Chicago Kid.
- "Money Maker" contains samples of "Human Jukebox", courtesy of Southern University and A&M College; and a sample from "Piece of My Love", written by Edward Riley, Aaron Hall, Timothy Gatling and Gene Griffin, as performed by Guy.
- "Can't Go for That" contains samples of "I Can't Go for That (No Can Do)", written by Sara Allen, Daryl Hall and John Oates, as performed by Hall & Oates.
- "Toni" contains interpolations of "Like a Pimp", written by Lavell Crump, Wesley Weston, Chad Butler, Bernard Freeman and Barry White, as performed by Lil' Flip featuring David Banner, which itself interpolates "Take It Off", written by Butler and Freeman, as performed by UGK.
- "Southside Hov" contains interpolations from "Feelin' It, written by Shawn Carter and David Willis, as performed by Jay-Z featuring Mecca.
- "Wait for You to Die" contains samples of "Early in the Mornin'", written and performed by Alan Lomax.
- "55 Times" contains uncredited dialogue from The Great Dictator, spoken by Charlie Chaplin, courtesy of United Artists.

== Charts ==
Chart performance for So Help Me God!
Chart (2020)	Peak position
Canadian Albums (Billboard)	77
US Billboard 200	15
US Top R&B/Hip-Hop Albums (Billboard)	8
