= Dope Don't Sell Itself =

Studio album by 2 Chainz
- Released: February 4, 2022
- Genre: Hip hop · trap
- Length: 32:32
- Label: Gamebread; T.R.U.; Def Jam
- Producer: BeatKing; Big Papito; Buddah Bless; C-Gutta; Caston Grigsby; Corbett; Corey Swimmer; FKi 1st; G. Ry; Hit-Boy; Kitwan McCoy; Krispy Hendrixx; LilJuMadeDaBeat; London Jae; LordQuest; Luke Crowder; Mannie Fresh; Mondo; Presley; Smash David; TurnMeUpJosh; WomaticTracks

2 Chainz chronology
So Help Me God! (2020)	Dope Don't Sell Itself (2022)	Welcome 2 Collegrove (2023)

Singles from Dope Don't Sell Itself
- 1. "Million Dollars Worth of Game" Released: January 7, 2022; 2. "Pop Music" Released: January 21, 2022

Dope Don't Sell Itself is the seventh studio album by American rapper 2 Chainz. It was released through Gamebread, T.R.U., and Def Jam Recordings on February 4, 2022. The album features guest appearances from Moneybagg Yo, BeatKing, Lil Baby, Roddy Ricch, 42 Dugg, YoungBoy Never Broke Again, Lil Durk, Sleepy Rose, Swae Lee, Stove God Cooks, Symba, Major Myjah, and Jacquees.

== Background and promotion ==
On July 17, 2021, 2 Chainz took to social media to announce that his next project would serve as his last trap album. He revealed the release date on January 21, 2022. He then revealed the cover art through social media on January 25, 2022. The tracklist was revealed through the CD pre-order on his website two days later, on January 27, 2022. 2 Chainz explained that the cover art of the album refers to his "first bank account".

== Singles ==
The album's lead single, "Million Dollars Worth of Game", which features American rapper 42 Dugg, was released on January 7, 2022. The second single, "Pop Music", which features American rappers Moneybagg Yo and BeatKing, was released on January 21, 2022.

== Critical reception ==
Professional ratings
Aggregate scores
Source	Rating
Metacritic	58/100
Review scores
Source	Rating
Allmusic	2.5/5 stars
Clash	6/10
Exclaim!	7/10
HipHopDX	2.6/5
Pitchfork	6.4/10
Rolling Stone	3/5 stars

Dope Don't Sell Itself received mixed reviews from critics. Writing for Clash, Robin Murray felt that "seven albums deep, 2 Chainz has long perfected his brand" and "'Dope Don't Sell Itself' is, he says, his 'last trap album' and while it's a punchy farewell to that style, it's often slight, and occasionally shallow". Antoine-Samuel Mauffette Alavo of Exclaim! wrote that, with the album, "he proves that his relevance remains undeniable" and "his signature voice and raunchy style, matched with his expert-level beat selection, allow for his versatility to shine through, while his legend status nets him refreshing featured guests who never overshadow Chainz", adding, "loosely narrated with scripted hustler talk, the album's 12 tracks are held together by 2 Chainz's aura and voice more so than by melodic progression" and "while Dope Don't Sell Itself does not inspire immediate playback like Chainz's last outing, So Help Me God!, and doesn't contain the breakout hits of 2017's acclaimed Pretty Girls Like Trap Music, it is a testament to the rapper's longevity and his vital role in ATL's shifting scene as a gravitational figure for all to aspire to become."

HipHopDX's Armon Sandler wrote that the album "finds the Drenchgod at an identity-bound impasse" as "he mostly abandons his message-driven endeavor and tries desperately to revert back to why he's beloved: booming production, humorous bars galore and an affinity for connecting with younger stars no matter how much the sound of rap has changed", adding that "in attempting to recreate his peak, he offers some familiar flows but mostly unimpressive lyrics that lean more toward grown-up nursery rhymes than his catchy, skillful couplets of days past", "but this album probably won't get a re-evaluation like his past work; his attempt to dial it back displays the colorful and zany bars that once captured ears are long gone".

Writing for Pitchfork, Jackson Howard felt that Dope Don't Sell Itself is 2 Chainz's first album that "feels predictable" and as "a brisk 12 songs, it plays more like a mixtape of throwaways, a collection of forgettable, though occasionally great, bangers with of-the-moment features and total disregard for cohesion or risk", adding that "the songs here are serviceable, thanks to 2 Chainz's ear and charisma. But they're more like templates than novel creations, far from his days of sampling Hall & Oates or trading verses with Kendrick Lamar over a Pharrell beat seemingly constructed from cutlery and trash cans". Jayson Buford of Rolling Stone opined that the album is "actually an attempt at a return to form" rather than being declared as 2 Chainz's last trap album and "this record isn't the return to form that it aims to be, but Chainz is back in his element here".

== Track listing ==
Dope Don't Sell Itself track listing
No.	Title	Writer(s)	Producer(s)	Length
1.	"Bet It Back"	Tauheed Epps; Corey Swimmer; Lamar Womack	Swimmer; WomaticTracks	2:57
2.	"Pop Music" (featuring Moneybagg Yo and BeatKing)	Epps; Demario White, Jr.; Justin Riley; Johnny McGowan; Nathaniel Orange	BeatKing	2:06
3.	"Kingpen Ghostwriter" (featuring Lil Baby)	Epps; Dominique Jones; Tyron Douglas, Jr.	Buddah Bless	2:22
4.	"Outstanding" (featuring Roddy Ricch)	Epps; Rodrick Moore, Jr.; Chauncey Hollis, Jr.; Dustin Corbett; Ryan Martinez	Hit-Boy; Corbett; G. Ry	2:55
5.	"Neighbors Know My Name"	Epps; Trocon Roberts, Jr.; Nolan Presley; Michael Johnson; Larry Johnson; Broderick Smith; Richard Sims; Dennis Butler; Adrian Parks; Cory Way; Lefabian Williams	FKi 1st; Presley	1:44
6.	"Million Dollars Worth of Game" (featuring 42 Dugg)	Epps; Dion Hayes; Majrooh Sultanpuri; Onkar Nayyar; Julian Mason	LilJuMadeDaBeat	2:40
7.	"Free B.G."	Epps; Byron Thomas; Armond Kendrick	Mannie Fresh; Mondo	1:44
8.	"10 Bracelets" (featuring YoungBoy Never Broke Again)	Epps; Kentrell Gaulden; Douglas	Buddah Bless	3:09
9.	"Lost Kings" (featuring Lil Durk and Sleepy Rose)	Epps; Durk Banks; Daniel Stodghill; Samuel Jimenez; Joshua Samuel; Jaucquez Lowe	Smash David; TurnMeUpJosh; London Jae	2:37
10.	"Caymans" (featuring Swae Lee)	Epps; Khalif Brown; Papa Fall; Michael Hepburn	Big Papito; Krispy Hendrixx	3:13
11.	"Vlad TV" (featuring Stove God Cooks, Symba, and Major Myjah)	Epps; Aaron Scott; Demario Driver; Myjah Veira; Jeffrey Nuamah; Caston Grigsby; Douglas Ingle; Donald Meadows; Curtis Washington II; Avery Earls	LordQuest; Grigsby	4:27
12.	"If You Want Me To" (featuring Jacquees)	Epps; Rodriquez Broadnax; Darwin Quinn; Luke Crowder; Kitwan McCoy	C-Gutta; Crowder; McCoy	2:38
Total length:				32:32

== Charts ==
Chart performance for Dope Don't Sell Itself
Chart (2022)	Peak position
Canadian Albums (Billboard)	88
US Billboard 200	23
US Top R&B/Hip-Hop Albums (Billboard)	13
