= No Face No Case =

Studio album by 2 Chainz and T.R.U.
- Released: February 7, 2020
- Genre: Hip-hop
- Length: 42:35
- Label: T.R.U.; Atlantic
- Producer: AJ Costly; Beat Butcha; Big Papito; Bizzy Genius; ChopHouze; Cubeatz; Forever Feddy; Fuse; Hitmaka; Hood Famous for the Winners Circle; June the Genius; Lamar "WomaticTracks" Womack; Mondo; Narquise; Smuggs; Tay Keith; Zale

2 Chainz chronology
Rap or Go to the League (2019)	No Face No Case (2020)	So Help Me God! (2020)

Professional ratings
Review scores
Source	Rating
Allmusic	3.5/5 stars
HipHopDX	3.1/5

No Face No Case is a collaborative studio album by American rapper 2 Chainz and T.R.U. (The Real University, which comprises Sleepy Rose, Worl, Skooly and Hott LockedN). It was released on February 7, 2020 via T.R.U. and Atlantic Records. Production was handled by several record producers, including Cubeatz, Hitmaka, June the Genius and Tay Keith. It features guest appearances from Bear1boss, NLE Choppa, NoCap, Quando Rondo and Quavo. The album debuted at number 182 on the Billboard 200 in the United States.

== Track listing ==
Although the album is co-credited to 2 Chainz and T.R.U, most tracks are performed by individual members (except for "Jefe Shit").

No Face No Case track listing
No.	Title	Writer(s)	Producer(s)	Length
1.	"Shoot It Out" (2 Chainz, Sleepy Rose, Worl and Hott LockedN)	Tauheed Epps; Daniel Stodghill; Little Randolph Barber, Jr.; Tradaerious Brinkley; Brytavious Chambers; Christian Ward	Hitmaka; Tay Keith	3:19
2.	"Virgil Discount" (2 Chainz and Skooly)	Epps; Kazarion Fowler; Anthony Costly; June James; Kevin Gomringer; Tim Gomringer	AJ Costly; Cubeatz; June the Genius	2:18
3.	"Pop Off" (Skooly)	Fowler; Jahmon Pauling; Jonathon Joyner	ChopHouze	2:22
4.	"Woo" (Sleepy Rose)	Stodghill; Papa Abdou Fall	Big Papito	2:40
5.	"Rock Out" (Hott LockedN featuring NLE Choppa)	Barber, Jr.; Bryson Potts; Kenneth Dezurn	Smuggs	2:55
6.	"Brick on My Face" (2 Chainz and Worl)	Epps; Brinkley; Eduardo Earle	Fuse	2:34
7.	"G-Wagon" (Hott LockedN)	Barber, Jr.; Eliot Peter Phillip Dubock; Zale Epstein	Beat Butcha; Zale	2:30
8.	"Georgia" (2 Chainz and Sleepy Rose)	Epps; Stodghill; Lamar Womack; Andres Santiago Aguirre; Loius Elveus; Chris Jasper; Ernie Isley; O'Kelly Isley Jr.; Marvin Isley; Ronald Isley; Rudolph Isley	Bizzy Genius; Lamar "WomaticTracks" Womack	3:48
9.	"New Levels New Devils" (Worl)	Brinkley; Bruce Billingy; Nicodemo Lalli	Hood Famous for the Winners Circle	2:39
10.	"What's Going On" (2 Chainz and Worl)	Epps; Brinkley; Fall	Big Papito	2:40
11.	"Reliable" (2 Chainz and Skooly featuring Quavo)	Epps; Fowler; Quavious Marshall; Armond Dewayne Kendrick	Mondo	2:47
12.	"How I Feel" (remix) (Skooly featuring NoCap and Quando Rondo)	Fowler; Kobe Vidal Crawford; Tyquain Terrel Bowman; Benjamin Lasnier; John Addison	Forever Feddy	4:08
13.	"Fake Beef" (2 Chainz and Hott LockedN)	Epps; Barber, Jr.; Isaiah Syncere Jackson	Narquise	2:48
14.	"Jefe Shit"	Epps; Barber, Jr.; Brinkley; Fowler; Stodghill; Fall	Big Papito	2:48
15.	"Vote" (Skooly and Worl featuring Bear1boss)	Brinkley; Fowler; Daniel Pointer; Fall	Big Papito	2:14
Total length:				42:35

== Charts ==
Chart performance for No Face No Case
Chart (2020)	Peak position
US Billboard 200	182
