= My Soul to Keep (album) =

Studio album by Sha Stimuli
- Released: October 27, 2009
- Recorded: 2008–09
- Genre: Rap
- Length: 1:08:54
- Labels: Chambermusik Records; E1 Music
- Producers: Just Blaze; Lord Digga; Jaisu; Mike Chops; J. Cardim; Victorious DeCosta; G-Clef da Mad Komposa; Focus; Beat Butcha; WMS Sultan; M Dot; Ian Heyward; Jaywann; Cookin Soul; M-Phazes; BellRinger

Sha Stimuli chronology
The Break-Up (2008)	My Soul to Keep (2009)	Overtime: My Soul To Keep (2010)

Professional ratings
Review scores
Source	Rating
XXL	3/5 stars
HipHopDX	4/5 stars

My Soul To Keep is the debut studio album from Brooklyn rapper Sha Stimuli. It was released on October 27, 2009. The first single was "Move Back" produced by Just Blaze and featured Freeway and Young Chris.

== Track listing ==
No.	Title	Producer(s)	Length
1.	"Duction"	Victorious DeCosta	1:00
2.	"Hang On" (featuring The Astronomical Kid)	Lord Digga	4:24
3.	"My Soul"	Jaisu	3:30
4.	"Blasphemy"	Ian Heyward	3:29
5.	"Do It for the Doe"	WMS Sultan	4:31
6.	"Move Back/The Reason" (featuring Freeway and Young Chris)	Just Blaze; M Dot	5:41
7.	"I Wish I Was You" (featuring Bellringer)	Bellringer	5:03
8.	"The Smelly Cat Song"	Mike Chops	3:56
9.	"What's Wrong with That? (Wake Up the World)" (featuring Torae)	Beat Butcha	4:37
10.	"Good Day/Change"	J. Cardim; Jaymann	5:32
11.	"I Believe" (featuring Lydia Caesar and Khaliq)	Focus...	4:13
12.	"Have You Seen Him?"	Cookin Soul	4:09
13.	"My Girl" (featuring Khaliq)	M-Phazes	3:55
14.	"Last Time/Bucket List"	Victorious DeCosta; Focus..	5:24
15.	"Sometimes" (featuring Lydia Caesar)	J. Cardim	5:25
16.	"Follow the Leader"	G-Clef da Mad Komposa	4:05
Total length:			1:08:04
