= Sha Stimuli =

American rapper (born 1978)

- Also known as: The Present, S.T.I., Stimuli
- Born: Sherod Khaalis
- Origin: Brooklyn, New York City, U.S.
- Genres: East Coast hip hop
- Occupation: Rapper
- Years active: 2003–present
- Label: 10 Minutes Late Records

Sha Stimuli (born Sherod Khaalis on August 9, 1978) is an American rapper from Brooklyn, New York City. He is known for his mixtape releases, beginning with Let Me Show You the Way in 2002, which earned him a spot in Source Magazine's "Unsigned Hype" section. Sha Stimuli is the cousin of Dre Knight and is the younger brother of producer and rapper Lord Digga, through whom he was introduced to Brooklyn rappers such as Notorious B.I.G. and Masta Ace.

== Background ==
As a kid, Sha Stimuli often followed in the footsteps of his older brother, Lord Digga, learning about the music business. As a producer on the Notorious B.I.G.'s album Ready to Die, Digga often took his little brother to recording sessions at the studio, which later influenced him to become a rapper. At only 14 years old, Stimuli, as Kid Dynamite, appeared on Masta Ace's album SlaughtaHouse. Before continuing with music, Stimuli focused on his other love, basketball, playing at Brooklyn Technical High School, and heading to Iowa to play NCAA Division 1. In 1997, he studied at Delaware State University while interning at Roc-A-Fella Records, bringing him closer to his passion of music.

== Musical career ==
In college, Stimuli gained recognition by being active in freestyle ciphers. Beginning his mixtape career in 2002, Stimuli released his first tape, Let Me Show You the Way, gaining him recognition in various print and online publications. Some years later, Stimuli was signed to Virgin Records and was set to release his debut album, Thee Emotion Picture, in the third quarter of 2007. Recording at Baseline Studios, Stimuli had producers Just Blaze and Nottz working on production for the album, but the process soon came to a halt due to problems that arose at Virgin Records. In early 2008, legal issues between Virgin Records and Def Jam left Sha Stimuli without a management team or label.

In early 2008, together with childhood friend DJ Victorious, Stimuli took on an endeavour to release one mixtape per month for the next 12 months. Each mixtape had a theme and concept, ranging from politics (March On Washington) to relationships (Love Jones, The Breakup), and gained him a significant amount of attention. In October 2008 Sha was also featured on the track "Destined to Shine" from Statik Selektah's album Stick 2 the Script.

=== Debut album ===
Sha Stimuli released his debut album, My Soul to Keep, on October 27, 2009, with Chambermusik Records / El Distribution. The first single, "Move Back," features rappers Freeway and Young Chris and was produced by Just Blaze. The album was released to critical success.

=== 2012 ===
On January 23, 2012, Sha Stimuli released The Calling, the first EP from his 2012 "The Rent Tape" series of twelve EPs. This series is similar to his 2008 series, in which he released 12 mixtapes in 12 months.

=== 2016 ===
On September 27, 2016, Sha Stimuli returned from a four-year hiatus from the music industry to release a new song titled "Sticks and Stones". Stimuli also announced his signing to 10 Minutes Late Records who will release his new album, "Lazarus", in 2017.

On December 11, 2016, Sha Stimuli continued his return to music and released a new song titled "New Jordans/A Poem for Mike" produced by Just Blaze and Needlz respectively. This song was met with positive reception.

=== Discography ===
==== Studio albums ====
- 2009: My Soul To Keep
- 2011: Unsung Vol. 1: The Garden of Eden
- 2017: Lazarus

==== Mixtapes ====
- 2003: Switch Sides
- 2007: The Present & the Future
- 2007: The Best of Me
- 2007: The Rehab
- 2008: The Wire
- 2008: Love Jones
- 2008: March on Washington
- 2008: The Secret
- 2008: While You Were Sleeping
- 2008: Hotter Than July (A Tribute to Stevie Wonder)
- 2008: Verses the World
- 2008: March On Washington (Election Edition)
- 2008: The Funeral
- 2008: Never or Now EP
- 2008: Please Download My Demo
- 2008: The Break-Up
- 2010: Overtime: My Soul to Keep
- 2011: The Break-Up Pt. 2: The Proposal

== Guest appearances ==
List of non-single guest appearances, with other performing artists, showing year released and album name
Title	Year	Other performer(s)	Album
"125 Part 3 (Connections)"	2007	Joell Ortiz, Ras Kass, Grafh, Gab Gacha	The Brick: Bodega Chronicles
"Cops & Go"	2007	Skyzoo, Maino	Hip-Hop Docktrine 2 (The Saga Continues)
"The N Word Song"	2007	—N/a	Hip-Hop Docktrine 2 (The Saga Continues)
"Save the Day"	2008	Torae, Kel Spencer	Daily Conversation
"Destined to Shine"	2008	Statik Selektah, Torae, Jon Hope	Stick 2 the Script
"Where I Come From" (Remix)	2009	Killah Priest, Willy Northpole, Stat Quo, DoItAll, Big Lou, Hussein Fatal, Mr. Probz	I Killed the Devil Last Night
"Different Day, Same Shit"	2009	Statik Selektah, JFK, Skyzoo	The Pre-Game EP
"Punish the Beat"	2010	Charlie Clips, Fred the Godson	Legendary
"Up There with You"	2010	John Regan, Naledge, Wayna	Sorry I'm Late
"The World"	2011	The White Shadow, Awkword, Viro the Virus	Savage
"County of Kings"	2011	PH, Pumpkinhead, Skyzoo, Ruste Juxx, LR Blitzkrieg	Know The Ledge
".45 Caliber Freedom"	2011	Stess The Emcee, Joe Scudda	Original Gangster The EP
"Unfukwitable"	2012	Red Eye, Ruste Juxx, Reks, Reef the Lost Cauze, Shabaam Sahdeeq, Nutso, M-Dot, Midaz the Beast	St. Fatrick's Day
"God's Plan" (Remix)	2012	I-20	Endless Pursuit
"Architecture"	2013	Natti, Substantial	Still Motion
"The World is Yours"	2014	Awkword, Viro the Virus, Dominant1	World View
"Voodoo Priest"	2014	t.h.e. MisFit Crazy8	Re-State Of Emergency
"Triangle Offense"	2014	Skyzoo, Torae	Barrel Brothers
"Delirium"	2014	Willie the Kid, Bronze Nazareth, Sean Price	The Living Daylights
"F*ck You"	2016	Mike Beatz, Adonis, Lucian	Boom Bap
"Alive"	2017	Stess The Emcee, C-Red, Mela Machinko	Stess the Emcee Must Live

=== EPs ===
- 2012: The Calling
- 2012: The Chills
- 2012: The March
- 2012: The TrueMan Show
- 2012: The Emcee
- 2012: The Old Me: How I Met Your Baby Mother
- 2012: The New Me: Sherod Khaalis
- 2012: The Savior
- 2012: The 9.2.5
- 2012: The Upper Room
- 2012: The Motion Soundtrack
- 2012: The Present
