= Only for Dolphins =

2020 studio album by Action Bronson

Only For Dolphins

Studio album by Action Bronson
- Released: September 25, 2020
- Genres: East Coast hip-hop; jazz rap
- Length: 35:54
- Labels: Loma Vista; Concord
- Producers: Action Bronson (also exec.); The Alchemist; Antman Wonder; Budgie; Daringer; DJ Muggs; Harry Fraud; Samiyam; Tommy Mas; Yung Mehico

Action Bronson chronology
Lamb Over Rice (2019)	Only For Dolphins (2020)	Cocodrillo Turbo (2022)

Singles from Only for Dolphins
- 1. "Latin Grammys" Released: July 30, 2020; 2. "Golden Eye" Released: September 9, 2020; 3. "Mongolia" Released: September 16, 2020

Only for Dolphins is the fifth studio album by American rapper Action Bronson. It was released on September 25, 2020, through Loma Vista Recordings and Concord Records. An East Coast hip-hop album, Only for Dolphins continues Bronson's humorous and luxurious themes while being more eclectic and relaxed compared to his past work. Sonically, the album contains a wide range of music sampled, particularly soul, funk, and jazz. Production was handled by multiple producers, including Bronson himself, the Alchemist, DJ Muggs, Harry Fraud and Daringer. Guest features include saxophonist Yung Mehico and rappers Meyhem Lauren and Hologram.

The album was first teased on a lyric from a track on Bronson's previous studio album White Bronco (2018). In between both albums, he went through a weight loss transformation and began his acting career. On the inspiration of Only for Dolphins, Bronson chose the titular creatures as the main theme of the album due to their intelligence. He also painted the album's cover artwork. Lyrically, Only for Dolphins revolves around dolphins, wealth, food, and absurdity.

To promote the album, Bronson released three singles, headlined the streaming event the Virtual Roo-Ality festival, released an ice cream cake, a personal ice cream flavor, a signature fragrance, stuffed dolphins, and olive oil. Only for Dolphins received mixed-to-positive reviews from music critics, who praised Bronson's performance and personal maturity on the album. However, some saw the album as too similar to his previous work and felt that it was constrained artistically.

== Background ==
In 2018, Action Bronson released his fourth solo studio album White Bronco, which also served as his first independently-released album after departing from Vice Records. On the album's track "Mt. Enta", he stated that his following album would be considered "only for dolphins." The following year, he collaborated with the Alchemist on the EP Lamb Over Rice (2019). Around this time, Bronson began his acting career, appearing in The Irishmen (2019) and The King of Staten Island (2020).

In May 2020, Bronson shared to TMZ that he began losing weight during the COVID-19 pandemic, having lost fifty pounds. He stated that began taking his health seriously after becoming a father, with his peak weight being 363 pounds. Bronson began adapting a regular workout routine and a healthier diet, and also added that he planned to release a new album in July. By the end of the year, Bronson revealed to have lost 127 pounds, weighting down to about 236 pounds.

Bronson explained the inspiration for Only for Dolphins, stating that he used dolphins as its theme due to their intelligence. He also joked that he made the title because "it's so complex that only dolphins can understand it." Bronson painted the album artwork for Only for Dolphins, having took up the hobby in 2017. The album artwork details dolphins, the Grim Reaper, RoboCop, and coins, which Bronson considered to be inspired by video games.

== Music and lyrics ==
=== Overview ===
Only for Dolphins is an East Coast hip-hop album. It consists of twelve songs in a running time of nearly thirty-six minutes. The album still shares some similarities from Bronson's past work, including his sense of humor, pleasures in life, highly-detailed descriptions of food, and non-sequiturs. However, compared to his past work, the album leans more into Bronson's growing eccentric style and features a "laid-back vibe".

Lyrically, Only for Dolphins revolves around dolphins, wealth, food, and absurdity. In addition, the album occasionally features sounds of dolphins, seagulls, and crashing waves. Saxophonist Yung Mehico and rappers Meyhem Lauren and Hologram make guest appearances on the album.

Away from Bronson's traditional boom bap style, the album samples from a wide range of music, particularly soul, funk, and soul-jazz, as well as music sourced from countries including France, Jamaica, and Turkey. Various styles of music sampled on the album include Turkish psych, reggae, French film scores, lovers rock, Russian funk, 1960s Brazilian pop, and lounge rock.

Bronson further explained the album's musical style on an interview with Clash, revealing that he often finds obscure and "weird" music, having learned the hobby from the Alchemist. His interest in various countries from the world also helped influence its sound. Only for Dolphins features production from the Alchemist, Budgie, Daringer, DJ Muggs, Harry Fraud, Tommy Mas, and Samiyam.

=== Tracks ===
A self-produced track, "Capoeira" opens the album with a saxophone solo by Yung Mehico. Lyrically, Bronson about various scenarios in exquisite detail, such as sniffing cocaine off mirrors, hopping in a Jacuzzi with "12 freaks", and driving around a "beamer" while listening to Gerald Levert. "C12H16N2" shows Bronson grappling on his aging, in which he realized "there was no heroes." A latin jazz-style track, "Latin Grammys" features non-sequitur punchlines and humorous braggadocio, where Bronson references Dolph Lundgren, baklava, Tom Cruise, and sports events from the 1990s. He also raps about his exercise routine, stating that he could touch his toes and do "two hours of stretching a day."

Relying on a funk riff and a sample from The Wire, "Mongolia" features verses from rappers Meyhem Lauren and Hologram. On the track, Bronson references the New York Mets, yogurt chain 16 Handles, and actor David Caruso. Lauren brags about his medallions while Hologram raps about eating African mushrooms "while rappin' on tubes." "Vega" features "booming drums" and jazz-style piano. "Sergio" is lyrically based on Bronson's personal luxuries.

"Shredder", again featuring reggae influences, sonically builds itself on "somber saxophone lines, a prominent bassline, and shimmering keys." Lyrically, Bronson portrays himself as a villain in a noir-like environment. "Cliff Hanger" highlights Bronson's fondness for sports by mentioning athletes Gary Sheffield, Earl Monroe, Bo Jackson, and James Worthy. He also touched on his interest in film, referencing Vampire in Brooklyn (1995), The Matrix (1999), Face/Off (1997). and the titular Cliffhanger (1993). "Hard Target" closes the album with Bronson reflecting on his past, taking pride on his achievements, and rapping about "the diminishing effects of weed on his brain."

== Promotion and release ==
On July 30, 2020, Bronson released "Latin Grammys", which serves as the lead single from Only for Dolphins. It also came with an accompanying music video, which contains footage of Bronson's face digitally inserted into Magnús Ver Magnússon, a bodybuilder who won the 1995 World's Strongest Man competition. On September 7, Bronson and Morgenstern's Finest Ice Cream announced frozen desserts that were later released for a limited time. It is a "cornmeal chiffon cake base and encased in charred guava meringue." The kit also came with additional desserts.

On September 9, Bronson officially announced that the album was going to be titled Only for Dolphins, stating that it was set to release on September 25 by Loma Vista Recordings and Concord Records. On the same day, he released its second single, "Golden Eye". On September 16, Bronson released the album's third and final single, "Mongolia", featuring rappers Meyhem Lauren and Hologram. On the same day, he was announced to be a headlining artist alongside Charli XCX and Denzel Curry on the Virtual Roo-Ality festival, a streaming event that took place from September 24 to 26.

On September 25, Only for Dolphins was released to digital streaming providers by Loma Vista Recordings and Concord Records. Its release was accompanied by Bronson's signature fragrance titled Splash, stuffed dolphins, and personalized ice cream flavor and cake announced earlier. Commercially, the album debuted and peaked at number 53 on the US Top Album Sales chart on the week of November 14, 2020. On December 8, Bronson announced the release of a limited edition "extra virgin olive oil" for the holiday season, which was sold on the store Grove and Vine. It also featured label and stamp art designed by Bronson.

== Critical reception ==
Professional ratings
Review scores
Source	Rating
AllMusic	3.5/5 stars
Laut.de	3/5 stars
The Line of Best Fit	7.5/10
Loud and Quiet	6/10
Pitchfork	6.7/10

Only for Dolphins received mixed-to-positive reviews from music critics. Andy Kellman of AllMusic complimented the album's eclectic style, in which he considered Bronson's concept on Only for Dolphins to be "vivid as ever" and making up "for the decreasing variation in his microphone approach." The Line of Best Fit reviewer Liam Iscoe-Jones also gave a positive review of the album, describing Bronson's style as "colorful, deeply entertaining and stubbornly unchanging."

Gabe Sherman of the Arts Fuse questioned how Bronson's larger-than-life persona reflects his true identity. Beneath the humor and lifestyle imagery, Sherman noted that Only for Dolphins highlights his personal growth and maturity, and believed that it would have been more meaningful if Bronson revealed more of himself. Dean Van Nguyen of Pitchfork still saw Bronson as a "captivating personality" and imaginative compared to other rappers, but sees his distinctive humor, use of pop culture references, and descriptions of food as no longer impressive as they were. Nguyen also noticed that he usually raps less intensely on Only for Dolphins, even in comparison to White Bronco

While Alex Francis of Loud and Quiet considered Bronson's performance to remain "entertaining, funny and skilled" as before, he considered Only for Dolphins to sound highly similar to his previous releases. He stated that it doesn't feel "meaningfully different" from White Bronco and the EP Lamb Over Rice. Similarly, Micro Leier of Laut.de saw it as an enjoyable album, but criticized it for leaning into a comfortable template rather than pushing boundaries, seeing it as a reflection that music became more of a hobby for Bronson compared to his momentum in 2013. Qobuz writer Brice Miclet wrote that his rapping can be "annoying, but he always manages to win us over with music that makes us feel good."

== Track listing ==
Credits adapted from liner notes and Tidal.

No.	Title	Writer(s)	Producer(s)	Length
1.	"Capoeira" (featuring Yung Mehico)	Ariyan Arslani; Lee Holloway; Matt Carrillo	Action Bronson	3:21
2.	"C12H16N2"	Arslani; Jean Claudric; Rory Quigley	Harry Fraud	2:39
3.	"Latin Grammys"	Arslani; Marilyn Kane; Robert Bianco; Tommy Kotler	Tommy Mas	2:50
4.	"Golden Eye"	Arslani; Ben Scholefield; Kevin Kendricks; Leon Leiffer	Budgie	2:48
5.	"Mongolia" (featuring Hologram and Meyhem Lauren)	Arslani; James Rencher; Jason Rencher; Yimaz Kayral	Action Bronson	2:52
6.	"Vega"	Arslani; Anthony Markeith; Lawrence Muggerud	DJ Muggs; AntMan Wonder	2:46
7.	"Splash"	Arslani; Sam Baker	Samiyam	1:59
8.	"Sergio"	Alan Maman; Arslani; Jeff Perry; Zachary Perry	The Alchemist	3:10
9.	"Shredder"	Arslani; Thomas Paladino; Nikolay Simakov	Daringer	2:00
10.	"Cliff Hanger"	Arslani; Scholefield; Sarah McIntosh	Budgie	2:21
11.	"Marcus Aurelius"	Arslani; Thomas Paladino; Clarence Reid	Daringer	4:05
12.	"Hard Target"	Arslani; Carrillo; Quigley	Harry Fraud; Yung Mehico	5:03
Total length:				35:54

=== Notes ===
- "Capoeira" samples "Into New Dimensions" by I.N.E..
- "Latin Grammys" samples "Idle Hands" by Harlem River Drive.
- "Golden Eye" samples "Best Love" by the Blackstones.
- "Sergio" samples "Go Away" by Jackie Wilson.

== Charts ==
Chart performance for Only for Dolphins
Chart (2020)	Peak position
US Top Album Sales (Billboard)	53
