= Slant Face Killah =

2024 album by Conway the Machine

Studio album by Conway the Machine
- Released: May 10, 2024
- Genre: East Coast hip-hop
- Length: 60:05
- Labels: Drumwork; Empire
- Producers: The Alchemist; Avenue Beatz; Beat Butcha; Beats Anonymous; Camoflauge Monk; Don Cannon; Cardo; Rayshon Cobbs Jr.; Cool & Dre; Sean Corey; Cubeatz; Daringer; Kasseem Dean; David Emmanuel; Elijah Hooks; Jesse Miller; Musicman Ty; Nape; Dan Ross; Sadhugold; Conductor Williams

Conway the Machine chronology
Won't He Do It (2023)	Slant Face Killah (2024)	You Can't Kill God with Bullets (2025)

Singles from Slant Face Killah
- 1. "Give & Give" Released: January 19, 2024; 2. "Mutty" Released: January 19, 2024; 3. "Vertino" Released: February 16, 2024; 4. "Ten/Rya Interlude" Released: May 3, 2024

Slant Face Killah (SFK) is the fourth studio album by American rapper Conway the Machine. It was released on May 10, 2024, through Drumwork Music Group and Empire Distribution. Originally announced as a B-side record to follow 2023's Won't He Do It, the name was later changed to its current name partly due to label speculation. The album features guest appearances from Stove God Cooks, Larry June, Flee Lord, Method Man, SK Da King, Joey Badass, Key Glock, Rya Maxwell, Tech N9ne, 2 Eleven, Ab-Soul, Jay Worthy, T.F. and Raekwon.

== Promotion and release ==
On January 19, 2024, the album's first and lead single "Give & Give" with Cool & Dre was released. The music video was released that same day, which also featured the track "Mutty" with Stove God Cooks.

On February 16, the third single "Vertino" with Joey Badass was released, together with an accompanying music video.

On April 24, Conway revealed the album title, cover art and release date.

"Ten/Rya Interlude" featuring Key Glock was released on May 3, 2024, serving as the album's fourth single.

== Reception ==
Slant Face Killah received a mixed review from Gabriel Bras Nevares, stating "For the most part, Slant Face Killah is still a very worthy album in Conway's catalog; it's just in some small but important Griselda details that it falters. When there's so much quality to go through, it makes these crevices look like caverns".

== Track listing ==
Slant Face Killah track listing
No.	Title	Writer(s)	Producer(s)	Length
1.	"Despertar"	Demond Price	Elijah Hooks; Jesse Miller	1:08
2.	"Mutty" (featuring Stove God Cooks)	Price; Aaron Scott	Conductor Williams; David Emmanuel; Nape	5:28
3.	"Give & Give" (with Cool & Dre)	Price; Myra Summers	Cool & Dre; Rayshon Cobbs Jr.	2:39
4.	"Milano Nights, Pt. 1"	Price	Camoflauge Monk; Hooks; Sean Corey	4:46
5.	"Kin Xpress" (featuring Larry June)	Price; Larry Hendricks III	Conductor Williams	5:38
6.	"Meth Back!" (featuring Method Man, SK Da King, and Flee Lord)	Price	Daringer	5:08
7.	"Ninja Man" (featuring Swizz Beatz)	Price	Avenue Beatz; Kasseem Dean; Musicman Ty	4:24
8.	"Vertino" (with Joey Badass)	Price; Jo-Vaughn Virginie Scott	Camoflauge Monk; Dan Ross; Sadhugold; Corey	5:33
9.	"Ten / Rya Interlude" (featuring Key Glock and Rya Maxwell)	Price; Markeyvius Cathey	Cubeatz; Don Cannon	6:00
10.	"Dasani"	Price	Beats Anonymous	2:50
11.	"Raw!" (featuring Tech N9ne)	Price; Aaron Yates	Cardo	4:55
12.	"Surf & Turf" (with Jay Worthy featuring 2 Eleven, Ab-Soul, and T.F.)	Price; 2 Eleven; Herbert Stevens IV; T.F.; Jeffrey James	Conductor Williams	6:26
13.	"Karimi"	Price	Beat Butcha; Camoflauge Monk; Corey	3:50
14.	"The Red Moon in Osaka" (featuring Raekwon)	Price; Corey Woods	The Alchemist	6:56
Total length:				60:05

== Personnel ==
- Conway the Machine – vocals
- Mark B. Christensen – mastering
- Rook Flair – mixing (all tracks), recording (track 9)
- Nick Cavalieri – engineering
- Jesse Miller – vocals (track 1)
- Sandra – vocals (track 1)
- Chad Kemp – recording (tracks 2, 3, 5)
- Elijah Hooks – recording (tracks 4, 6), arrangement (4, 14)
- Don Taylor – recording (tracks 4, 13, 14)
- Rod Bonner – arrangement (tracks 4, 14)
- Toney Boi – recording (tracks 5, 11, 12)
- Todd Copper – recording (track 5)
- Carl Urban – recording (track 6)
- Cris Douglas – recording (track 6)
- Sloan Welsch – recording (track 6)
- Jodie Grayson Williams – recording (tracks 7, 11, 12)
- Demond Price Jr. – recording (track 9)
- Spencer Vega – recording (tracks 11, 13)
- Ben Cybusky – recording (track 11)
- Brian Zarazua – recording (track 12)
- Python – recording (track 12)
- Rondy Gibson – recording (track 12)

== Charts ==
Chart performance for SFK
Chart (2024)	Peak position
UK Album Downloads (Official Charts)	86
