= Cory Kendrix =

American rapper

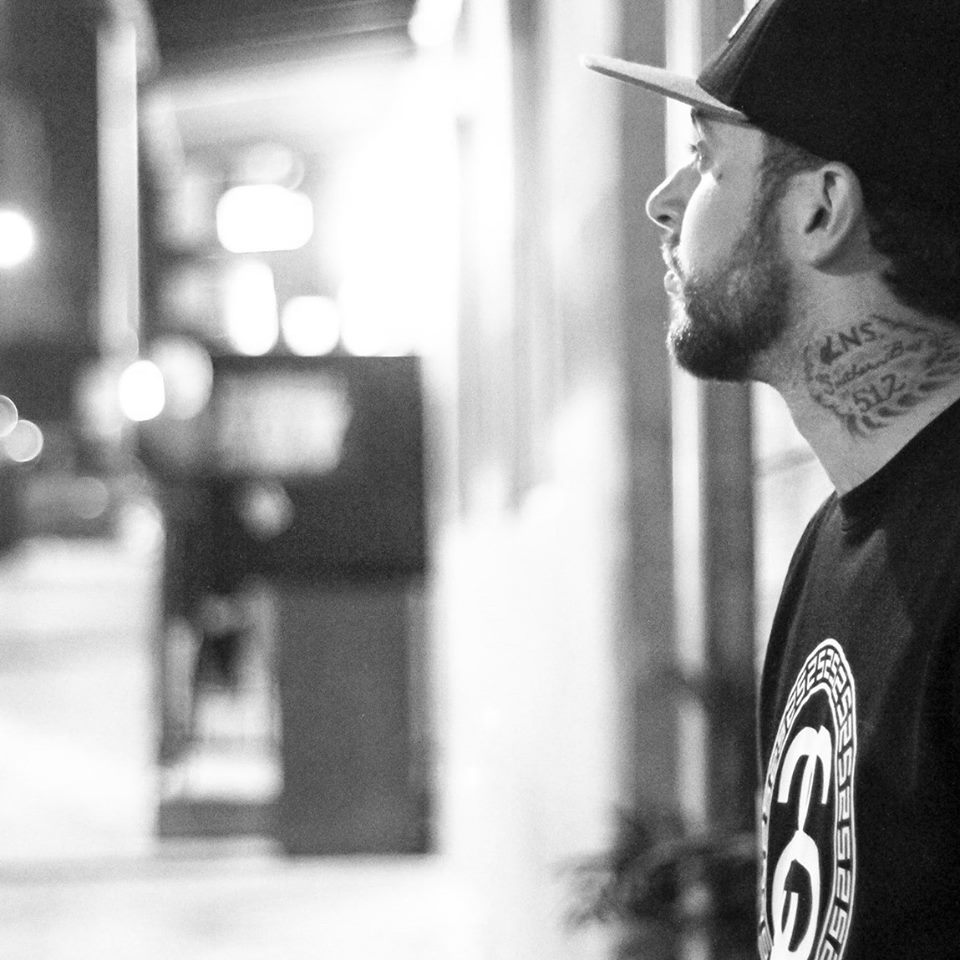

Background information
- Also known as: KNDRX
- Born: Cory Andrew Kennedy; July 24, 1988 (age 37); Port Orford, Oregon, U.S.
- Origin: Salem, Oregon, U.S.
- Genres: Hip hop; R&B
- Occupations: Rapper; singer; record producer
- Years active: 2013–present
- Labels: LNS Crew, Davies Entertainment
- Website: www.lnscrew.com

Cory Kendrix (born Cory Andrew Kennedy; July 24, 1988) is an American independent rapper, emcee, singer, music producer and hip hop artist based out of Denver, Colorado. In 2014, he released the IGNORANCE LP as well as the Worth Something EP with Red Bull Music Academy 2013 graduate Anna Love. During 2015, Cory performed at Pop Montreal and the Denver Westword Music Showcase. Changing his artist name to KNDRX, he released his debut R&B solo EP in 2017 entitled Me Right Now under the LNS Crew imprint and then released GUMBO under Davies Entertainment in 2021. In 2023, KNDRX performed at SXSW and was featured on two of New York rapper Conway The Machine's projects, Drumwork The Album and Palermo.

== Discography ==
- IGNORANCE (2014)
- Worth Something EP (2014)
- Me Right Now EP (2017)
- GUMBO (2021)
