= La Maquina (mixtape) =

2021 mixtape by Conway the Machine

Mixtape by Conway the Machine
- Released: April 16, 2021
- Genre: Hip-hop
- Length: 40:59
- Labels: Griselda; Drumwork; Empire

Conway the Machine chronology
If It Bleeds It Can Be Killed (2021)	La Maquina (2021)	The Missing Bricks (2021)

La Maquina is the eighth commercial mixtape by American rapper Conway the Machine. Released April 16, 2021, through Griselda, Drumwork and distributed by Empire, it features 2 Chainz, 7xvethegenius, Benny the Butcher, El Camino, Jae Skeese, JID, Ludacris, Shots, and Westside Gunn. It was produced by the Alchemist, Bangladesh, Cardiak, Cozmo, Cubeatz, Daringer, Don Cannon, Jean Bleu JR Swiftz, Motif Alumni, Murda Beatz, and Sean Momberger.

== Background and promotion ==
On April 14, 2021, Conway released "Scatter Brain", featuring JID and Ludacris. He announced an April 16 release date.

== Critical reception ==
Professional ratings
Review scores
Source	Rating
Clash	7/10
Exclaim!	7/10
Pitchfork	7.5/10

La Maquina received positive reviews from critics. Dylan Green rated the album a 7.5/10, saying "La Maquina is Conway's best project since 2015's Reject 2, with an eclectic mix of beats and bars that tie everything together like twine around a turkey". Edward Bowser of Soul in Stereo rated it 4/5 stars, saying "La Maquina is a clear standout and among the best projects of 2021 already". Nick Sligh of The Stanford Daily said "there is an entertaining mix of old and new, and overall, La Maquina is a quality effort". Editors of Hip Hop Golden Age rated it a 7/10, saying "overall, while this isn’t the best Griselda project, there’s enough to enjoy on La Maquina".

=== Accolades ===
Year-end lists for La Maquina
Publication	List	Rank	Ref.
Complex	The Best Albums of 2021	29	

== Track listing ==
All tracks are written by Conway the Machine.

La Maquina track listing
No.	Title	Music	Length
1.	"Bruiser Brody"	JR Swiftz; Jean Bleu	3:20
2.	"6:30 Tip-Off"	Bangladesh	3:03
3.	"Blood Roses" (featuring Jae Skeese)	Cardiak	3:07
4.	"Clarity"	Don Cannon; Sean Momberger	2:04
5.	"KD"	Murda Beatz	3:40
6.	"200 Pies" (featuring 2 Chainz)	The Alchemist	4:25
7.	"Sister Abigail" (featuring Jae Skeese and 7xvethegenius)	JR Swiftz; Motif Alumni	4:18
8.	"Grace" (featuring Jae Skeese)	Cozmo	3:19
9.	"Scatter Brain" (featuring JID and Ludacris)	Don Cannon; Cubeatz	3:29
10.	"Had to Hustle" (featuring El Camino and Shots)	Cozmo	5:02
11.	"S. E. Gang" (featuring Benny the Butcher and Westside Gunn)	Daringer	5:01
Total length:			40:59

== Charts ==
Chart performance for La Maquina
Chart (2021)	Peak position
UK Album Downloads (Official Charts)	86
US Independent Albums (Billboard)	40
US Top Current Album Sales (Billboard)	58
