= WWCD (album) =

2019 studio album by Griselda

Studio album by Griselda, Benny the Butcher, Conway the Machine and Westside Gunn
- Released: November 29, 2019
- Genre: Hip hop
- Length: 46:27
- Labels: Griselda; Shady; Interscope
- Producers: Beat Butcha; Daringer

Griselda, Benny the Butcher, Conway the Machine and Westside Gunn chronology
Don't Get Scared Now (2016)	WWCD (2019)

Singles from WWCD
- 1. "Dr. Bird's" Released: October 18, 2019; 2. "Chef Dreds" Released: November 8, 2019

WWCD (an acronym for What Would ChineGun Do) is the debut studio album by American hip-hop group Griselda, composed of Benny the Butcher, Conway the Machine, and Westside Gunn. It was released on November 29, 2019, through Griselda, Shady, and Interscope. It features guest appearances from 50 Cent, Eminem, and Raekwon, among others, and production is handled by Daringer and Beat Butcha.

== Background ==
WWCD is an acronym for What Would ChineGun Do. It is a reference to Chine Gun Black, Benny the Butcher's late brother.

WWCD's lead single was "Dr. Bird's", released on October 18, 2019. On January 8 of the following year, a music video was released, directed by Hype Williams. On January 23, Griselda performed the song on The Tonight Show Starring Jimmy Fallon, the debut on the show for all members. In a 2023 retrospective, Thomas Hobbs of Okayplayer named the song as the breakout song for its producer, Daringer.

The second single, "Chef Dreds", released on November 8, 2019.

In an interview on October 20, 2023, Westside Gunn said a sequel to WWCD was in the making.

=== Cover ===
The cover of the album shows Clara "Claire" Gomez, a homeless woman who lived in Buffalo, New York. The Buffalo News reported she was killed on the night of May 23, 2023, aged 58, after being hit by a car. On May 25, Westside Gunn donated $10,000 to a GoFundMe set up by her family to cover the costs of her funeral.

== Contents ==
Writing for Pitchfork, Evan Rytlewski compares WWCD's production to hip-hop from the 1990s broadly. The album was produced by Griselda in-house producers Daringer and Beat Butcha, who did not use samples for the album.

The lyrics of WWCD cover criminal stories from each Griselda member, primarily cocaine dealing. On the song "Kennedy", an interlude, Westside Gunn repats the lyric "blow your fucking face off" while ad-libbing gun sounds. The opening song, "Marchello Intro", features spoken word from Raekwon.

== Reception ==
Professional ratings
Review scores
Source	Rating
Earmilk	5/5 stars
HipHopDX	4.5/5
Pitchfork	7.7/10

WWCD received positive reviews from critics. Evan Rytlewski of Pitchfork rated it a 7.7/10, complimenting the group's synergy, while criticizing the repetitive production. Hip Hop Golden Age rated it 79/10, calling it a "great but a just slightly (frustratingly and unnecessary [sic]) flawed project". Writing for Earmilk, Margaritë "Magi" Camaj rated it 5/5 stars, calling it "an impeccable album". Riley Wallace of HipHopDX rated it 4.5/5.

== Track listing ==
All music is composed by Daringer and Beat Butcha, except track 13 co-produced with Eminem.

No.	Title	Writer(s)	Length
1.	"Marchello Intro" (featuring Raekwon)	Jeremie Pennick; Demond Price; Alvin Worthy; Corey Woods; Eliot Dubock; Thomas Paldino	2:11
2.	"Chef Dreds"	Pennick; Worthy; Price; Dubock; Paldino	2:48
3.	"Moselle"	Pennick; Worthy; Price; Dubock; Paldino	3:59
4.	"Cruiser Weight Coke"	Pennick; Worthy; Price; Dubock; Paldino	3:52
5.	"Freddie HotSpot"	Pennick; Worthy; Price; Dubock; Paldino	3:52
6.	"Dr. Bird's"	Pennick; Price; Worthy; Dubock; Paldino	4:52
7.	"The Old Groove" (featuring Novel)	Pennick; Price; Worthy; Alonzo Stevenson; Dubock; Paldino	6:56
8.	"Scotties"	Pennick; Price; Worthy; Dubock; Paldino	2:31
9.	"Kennedy" (featuring Tiona Deniece)	Pennick; Price; Worthy; Tiona Deniece; Dubock; Paldino	0:42
10.	"City on the Map" (featuring 50 Cent)	Pennick; Price; Worthy; Curtis Jackson; Dubock; Paldino	3:12
11.	"May Store" (featuring Keisha Plum)	Pennick; Price; Worthy; Keisha Plum; Dubock; Paldino	4:46
12.	"Lowery (AA Outro)" (featuring AA Rashid)	Pennick; Price; Worthy; AA Rashid; Dubock; Paldino	1:57
13.	"Bang (Remix)" (featuring Eminem)	Pennick; Price; Worthy; Marshall Mathers; Dubock; Paldino; Luis Resto	5:08
Total length:			46:27

== Accolades ==
Publication	List	Rank	Ref.
Ambrosia For Heads	Top 15 Hip-Hop Albums Of 2019 List	—N/a	
Complex	Best Albums of 2019	22	
HipHopDX	The Best Rap & Hip Hop Albums Of 2019	4	

== Charts ==
Chart (2019)	Peak position
US Top Rap Albums (Billboard)	8
US Top R&B/Hip-Hop Albums (Billboard)	9

== See also ==
- 2019 in hip hop music
