= Wayna =

American singer

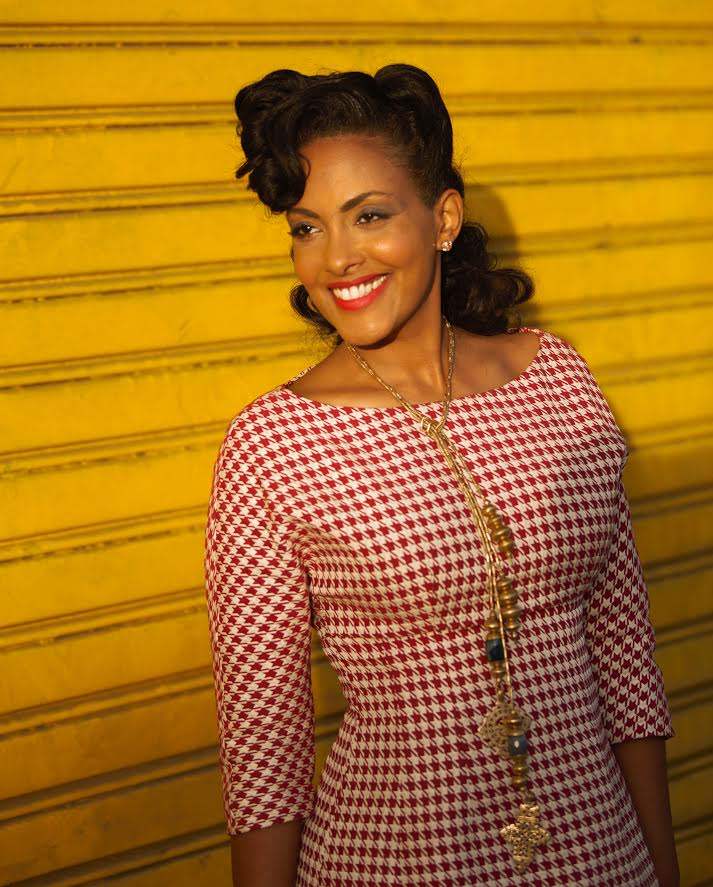
Wayna Wondwossen

Wayna (real name Woyneab Miraf Wondwossen) is an R&B/soul singer and songwriter who was born in Ethiopia and raised in the suburbs of Washington, D.C. She worked as a writer for the Clinton White House before releasing three solo albums, garnering three Billboard-charting singles and a Grammy nomination. She currently tours as a vocalist with musical icon Stevie Wonder.

== Early life and education ==
Wayna was born in Addis Ababa, Ethiopia, and immigrated to the United States with her mother at the age of three. She was raised in the suburbs of Washington, D.C., and began singing and acting as a child, performing in theater productions like "Annie" and "Damn Yankees," and touring with the children's musical review company, "Song Inc." As a young adult, Wayna began absorbing the works of artists who would later become her musical influences: Minnie Riperton, Billie Holiday, Sting, Stevie Wonder and Donny Hathaway among them.

While in college, Wayna was crowned Miss Black Unity of the University of Maryland, earning a one-year tuition scholarship at the 17th annual pageant. She also studied and performed as a soloist with the University of Maryland Gospel Choir under the direction of Valeria Foster. But it was after being invited to perform at her University's annual "Tribute to African Women, that Wayna ended up writing her first original piece performed to an audience. "It was a watershed moment for the artist" that inspired her to continue songwriting.

== Early career ==
After earning a bachelor's degree with a double major in English and Speech Communication, Wayna began working as a Writer in the Clinton White House, where she served for three years, writing Presidential proclamations and messages on women's issues, race relations, and international policy. She later worked with leaders of the Ethiopian business community, including Noah Samara (founder of World Space) and Dosho Shifferaw (creator of the Bowflex) as the executive director of the Ethiopian American Constituency—a political action committee serving the Ethiopian-American community.

== Music career ==
Wayna's debut album, Moments of Clarity, Book 1 was released in November, 2004 under her own production company, Quiet Power Productions and C-Side Entertainment. The album featured production from celebrated Ethiopian producers and arrangers, Abegaz Shiota and Thomas Gobena, as well as DC-based hip hop and R&B producers, James McKinney, Kev Brown, DJ RoddyRod, and Grammy nominated producer, Kokayi. The project was widely celebrated by altnernative soul listeners and tastemakers. "It is a groundbreaking release." Nu Flav Magazine "Lauryn Hill is a close comparison. Every track is a pleasure to listen to." Music Monthly. "She's a refreshing alternative to an ever-so diluted music industry." Digital DJs.com. "Moments of Clarity" could easily be re-dubbed 'Moments of Greatness,' and there are plenty of those moments on this project." musemuse.com. Mainstream media outlets also took notice. Essence Magazine said "Wayna is one to watch" and Billboard Magazine called her "a standout on the indie front." Also taking note, were acclaimed artists like Stevie Wonder, who after seeing her perform at the Temple Bar in California said "Her voice reminds me of Syreeta's. She's incredible."

Track listing

1. So Long Heartache featuring Wes Felton

2. This Ol Grudge

3. Mama's Sacrifice

4. Doubting Destiny

5. Straight Up featuring K'Alyn

6. Rose-Colored Glasses

7. Exposed featuring Cy Young

8. Slums of Paradise

9. Secret Identity

10. Desperation Days featuring Teddy Tadesse

11. Past Future Eternal

12. Redemption Song

Wayna collaborated with Bob Marley's drum and bass duo Sly and Robbie on the track "Perspective" for their album, Version Born released by Palm Pictures. She also served as a featured vocalist and writer on a number of independent projects for artists, including W. Ellington Felton, Kenn Starr, Kev Brown, Cy Young, RoddyRod, Muhsina, Kenny Chesney, E. Bland, the Kaffa Beanz, and Tamara Wellons.

Higher Ground

Building on the underground buzz of Moments of Clarity, Book 1, Wayna's sophomore effort, "Higher Ground" debuted with the single "Moonlight Rendezvous," which charted the Billboards for seven consecutive weeks, peaking at No. 3 on the Hot R&B Singles chart and No. 12 on the Hot 100. The follow-up single, "My Love" an impassioned plea to the loved ones of abused women, spent six consecutive weeks on Billboard, peaking at No. 2 on the Hot R&B Singles chart and No. 12 on the Hot 100. Wayna closed out the year by garnering a coveted Grammy nomination in the Best Urban/Alternative Performance Category for her remake "Lovin You (Music)" featuring Kokayi, which USA Today called "a refreshing take on the soul classic." The song, which she also co-produced is a fitting representation of her musical style. "She invokes Jill's coyness, Lauryn's consciousness, and Erykah's poetic silliness in one hum." okayplayer.com

Track Listing

1. Moonlight Rendezvous

2. A New Scenery

3. Billiclub f. Muhsinah

4. Lovin' You (Music) f. Kokayi

5. Close To You f. Kenn Starr

6. Daydream

7. Mr. Duracell

8. Interlude

9. Office Politics

10. My Love

11. Not Gonna Go

12. Home

13. The Stalking Horse

The Expats

Wayna's third LP, "The Expats" was released in November 2014, and The Washington Post called it "brilliant." Distributed by Yebo Music and mixed by multi-Grammy award-winning engineer Russell Elevado (D'Angelo, Alicia Keys, Erykah Badu), "the Expats" draws on diverse musical and cultural influences to create a blend of African d Reggae-inspired soul, fused with classic and alternative rock—Sade meets the Police. The project's sound, both progressive and retro, appeals to world, classic rock, reggae, and soul enthusiasts.

Track listing

1. Yo Yo

2. A Time Will Come featuring Emperor Haile Selassi

3. Echo

4. Amazing

5. I Don't Wanna Wait

7. Freak Show Intro featuring Chris Rouse

7. Freak Show

8. Send it Away featuring Frederic Yonnet

9 Long as You Know featuring Seteyn

10. Holy Heathen featuring Naz Tana

In 2015, Wayna joined the iconic, Stevie Wonder as a vocalist in his live band, performing with the Songs in the Key of Life Tour and in various spot dates through the US, Canada, and the UK.

== Personal life ==
Wayna is married to Kyle Stephen, who she met as a college student and is of Trinidadian descent. Their wedding aired as an episode of the Discovery Channel's hit series, "The Wedding Story." On May 12, 2010, Wayna gave birth to their first daughter Beza Edna Stephen, and their second daughter Zema Yeshi Stephen was born on March 27, 2014. They currently live in Bowie, MD.

Her single "My Love" reached the Billboard R&B charts in 2008, peaking at Number 99. Wayna was nominated for Best Urban/Alternative Performance for the song "Lovin You (Music)" at the 2009 Grammy Awards.

She was arrested on March 26, 2009, and charged with possession of a prohibited weapon at Bush Intercontinental Airport when she attempted to board a flight with a 24-inch collapsible police baton that she uses in her performances. A judge dismissed the charges the next day.

== Discography ==
- Moments of Clarity, Book 1 (Quiet Power, 2004)
- Higher Ground (Quiet Power, 2008)
- The Expats (Quiet Power, 2013)
