= God Don't Make Mistakes =

2022 studio album by Conway the Machine

Studio album by Conway the Machine
- Released: February 25, 2022
- Genre: Hip-hop
- Length: 48:04
- Label: Drumwork; Shady; Griselda; Interscope
- Producer: The Alchemist; the Beat Brothers; Beat Butcha; Bink; Cozmo; Daniel Cruz; Daringer; Dylan Graham; G Koop; Hit-Boy; J.U.S.T.I.C.E. League; Kill; Vidal Garcia

Conway the Machine studio album chronology
From King to a God (2020)	God Don't Make Mistakes (2022)	Won't He Do It (2023)

Conway the Machine full chronology
Greetings Earthlings (2022)	God Don't Make Mistakes (2022)	Organized Crime 2 (2022)

Singles from God Don't Make Mistakes
- 1. "Piano Love" Released: October 8, 2021; 2. "John Woo Flick" Released: February 4, 2022

God Don't Make Mistakes is the second studio album by American rapper Conway the Machine. It was released through Drumwork, Griselda, Shady, and Interscope on February 25, 2022. The album was preceded by two singles, "Piano Love" and "John Woo Flick". It features guest appearances from Beanie Sigel, Rick Ross, Lil Wayne, 7xvethegenius, Jae Skeese, T.I., Novel, Benny the Butcher, Westside Gunn, Wallo267, Jill Scott, and Keisha Plum.

== Background ==
Initially intended to be Conway's debut album, God Don't Make Mistakes was delayed several times throughout its development. Fellow Griselda member Westside Gunn stated in a 2018 interview that the album was "90 percent complete"; Conway himself stated in 2020 that he planned to release God Don't Make Mistakes shortly after his "album before the album", From King to a God.

== Critical reception ==
Professional ratings
Aggregate scores
Source	Rating
Metacritic	81/100
Review scores
Source	Rating
AllMusic	4.5/5 stars
Beats Per Minute	84%
Clash	9/10
Exclaim!	8/10
HipHopDX	4/5 stars
Pitchfork	7.5/10
RapReviews	8.5/10

At Metacritic, which assigns a weighted average score out of 100 to reviews from mainstream critics, God Don't Make Mistakes received an average score of 81 based on 8 reviews, indicating "universal acclaim".

God Don't Make Mistakes was praised for the candor and introspection of its lyrical content: a Pitchfork review describes the album as providing "an inner-glimpse at [Conway's] inspiring come-up, plagued with twists and pitfalls," and a HipHopDX review states that it "uncorks a lot of the themes and realities the Buffalo native has been keeping bottled up" in his previous work. The production on the album has been described as "a collage of boom-bap that is as haunting as it is ornate", although it has also been criticized as feeling "comfortable [rather than] remarkable". In the review for Exclaim!, Luke Fox compared the album to other releases from Eminem's label, declaring that it "avoids the mistakes some of Slim Shady's other find-and-signs have fallen victim to. That's due to an ear for dope beats in his wheelhouse and a willingness to, occasionally, get thug emo."

Concluding the review for AllMusic, Paul Simpson stated it to be "Easily Conway's most impressive work to date" and that it "is a culmination of everything he's experienced and achieved so far, and a bridge to the next phase of his life." Similarly, Beats Per Minute reviewer Marc Griffen wrote that the album "serves as the triumphant moment – the grimy underdog has become the seasoned vet" and claimed that it was "Conway's best to date, and one of the best rap albums to come out in 2022". Writing the review for Clash, Robin Murray proclaimed it "a career high" and that the album was a "stunning, multi-faceted achievement."

== Track listing ==
No.	Title	Writer(s)	Producer(s)	Length
1.	"Lock Load" (with Beanie Sigel)	Demond Price; Dwight Grant; Eliot Dubock; Thomas Paladino	Beat Butcha; Daringer	4:19
2.	"Tear Gas" (with Rick Ross and Lil Wayne)	D. Price; William Roberts II; Dwayne Carter; Cozmo Hickox; Nick Ashford; Valerie Simpson; Vidal Garcia	Cozmo; G Koop; Garcia	4:13
3.	"Piano Love"	D. Price; Daniel Alan Maman	The Alchemist	4:00
4.	"Drumwork" (with 7xvethegenius and Jae Skeese)	D. Price; Felicia Perry; Jarrett C. Jackson; Paladino	Daringer	4:34
5.	"Wild Chapters" (with T.I. and Novel)	D. Price; Clifford Harris; Alonzo Stevenson; Chauncey Hollis	Hit-Boy	4:01
6.	"Guilty"	D. Price; Roosevelt Harrell	The Beat Brothers; Bink	2:26
7.	"John Woo Flick" (with Benny the Butcher and Westside Gunn)	D. Price; Jeremie Pennick; Alvin Worthy; Paladino; Ricki Lamar Thomas	Kill; Daringer	4:46
8.	"Stressed" (with Wallo267)	D. Price; Wallace Peeples; Dubock; Paladino	Beat Butcha; Daringer	5:20
9.	"So Much More"	D. Price; Erik Ortiz; Kevin Crowe; Jimmy Hotz	J.U.S.T.I.C.E. League	3:24
10.	"Chanel Pearls" (with Jill Scott)	D. Price; Jill Scott; Hickox; Daniel Cruz; Dylan Graham	Cozmo; Cruz^{[c]}; Graham^{[c]}	3:18
11.	"Babas" (with Keisha Plum)	D. Price; Maman; Dubock	Beat Butcha; Daringer	3:29
12.	"God Don't Make Mistakes" (with Annette Price)	D. Price; Maman; Annette Price	The Alchemist	4:14
Total length:				48:04

Note

- ^{^[c]} indicates a co-producer

== Personnel ==
=== Performance ===
- Conway the Machine – rap vocals
- Beanie Sigel – rap vocals (1)
- Lil Wayne – rap vocals (2)
- Rick Ross – rap vocals (2)
- Viveca Hawkins – additional vocals (2)
- 7xvethegenius – rap vocals (4)
- Jae Skeese – rap vocals (4)
- T.I. – rap vocals (5)
- Novel – vocals (5)
- Kelli Price – background vocals (6)
- Brian Reid – organ, piano (6)
- Benny the Butcher – rap vocals (7)
- Westside Gunn – rap vocals (7)
- Wallo267 – rap vocals (8)
- Joshua Everett – keyboards (9)
- Jill Scott – vocals (10)
- Keisha Plum – vocals (11)
- Swarvy – organ, piano (12)
- Annette Price – vocals (12)

=== Technical ===
- Mark B. Christensen – mastering
- Eddie Sancho – mixing (1–5, 7, 9–12), additional mixing (8)
- Amond Jackson – mixing (6)
- Bink – mixing (6)
- Kuldeep Chudasama – mixing (8)
- Justin "DJ M80" Byrd – recording (1)
- Lloyd "Lucky Sven" Brown Jr – recording (1, 5, 7, 8, 12)
- Chad Kemp – recording (2, 4, 6, 9–11)
- The Alchemist – recording (3)
- Sonny Carson – recording (4)
- DJ Shay – recording (7)
- Jeremy Hunter – recording (10)

== Charts ==
Chart performance for God Don't Make Mistakes
Chart (2022)	Peak position
UK R&B Albums (OCC)	30
US Billboard 200	175
