= From King to a God =

- GIF digital cover

Studio album by Conway the Machine
- Released: September 11, 2020
- Genres: East Coast hip-hop; boom bap; mafioso rap; hardcore hip-hop
- Length: 49:39
- Label: Griselda
- Producers: Alchemist; Beat Butcha; Daringer; DJ Premier; Erick Sermon; Havoc; Hit-Boy; Khrysis; Murda Beatz; Rockwilder; Signalflow Music

Conway the Machine chronology
No One Mourns the Wicked (2020)	From King to a God (2020)	If It Bleeds It Can Be Killed (2021)

Singles from From King to a GOD
- 1. "Lemon" Released: July 10, 2020

From King to a God (stylized as From King to a GOD) is the debut solo studio album by American rapper Conway the Machine. It was released on September 11, 2020, by Griselda Records, Drumwork and Empire Distribution. Production was handled by eleven record producers: Beat Butcha, Daringer, Alchemist, DJ Premier, Erick Sermon, Havoc, Hit-Boy, Khrysis, Murda Beatz, Rockwilder and Signalflow Music. It features guest appearances from Armani Caesar, Benny the Butcher, Dej Loaf, El Camino, Flee Lord, Freddie Gibbs, Havoc, Lloyd Banks, Method Man and Westside Gunn. A deluxe version was released on December 18, 2020.

== Critical reception ==
Professional ratings
Aggregate scores
Source	Rating
Metacritic	82/100
Review scores
Source	Rating
AllMusic	4/5 stars
Clash	8/10
Consequence of Sound	B+
Exclaim!	8/10
HipHopDX	4.3/5
Pitchfork	6.9/10
RapReviews	8.5/10
Slant Magazine	3.5/5 stars

From King to a God was met with universal acclaim from music critics. At Metacritic, which assigns a normalized rating out of 100 to reviews from mainstream publications, the album received an average score of 82, based on eight reviews. The aggregator Album of the Year has the critical consensus of the album at an 80 out of 100, based on 8 reviews.

Andy Kellman of AllMusic rated the album 4/5 stars, saying "a consistently striking and highly collaborative full-length that, despite its hospitable quality, is the Griselda member's most exemplary solo release yet". An editor of Clash rated it an 8/10, saying "forceful and atmospheric, From A King To A God punches through the glass ceiling, its purposeful swagger leering out of the speakers". Rashad Grove of Consequence rated it a B+, saying "From King to a GOD is arguably one of the best Griselda projects thus far and a viable contender for year-end lists". Kyle Mullin of Exclaim! rated the album an 8/10, saying "listening to [From King to a God] is hearing the sound of an underground king ascend to the status of the esteemed guest artists he attracts". Riley Wallace HipHopDX rated it a 4.3/5, saying "if his discography to this point was the regular season, From King To A GOD could be a sign that play-off Maquina is going to be a problem". Matthew Ismael Ruiz of Pitchfork rated it a 6.9/10—the lowest score it received—saying "From King to a God would be considered a solid effort from most MCs, but it's clear Conway has his aim set higher". Sy Shackleford of RapReviews rated it an 8.5/10, saying "with [From King to a God], I think he can reach that plateau with the title serving as a symbol of his newly-appointed station". Sophia Ordaz of Slant Magazine rated it 3.5/5 stars, saying "From King to God’s biggest boast is his vulnerability".

== Track listing ==
Sourced by Tidal.

Standard edition
No.	Title	Writer(s)	Producer(s)	Length
1.	"From King"	Demond Price; Thomas Paladino; Kevin Nash	Daringer	3:41
2.	"Fear of God" (featuring DeJ Loaf)	Price; Deja Trimble; Chauncey Hollis	Hit-Boy	2:58
3.	"Lemon" (featuring Method Man)	Price; Clifford Smith; Eliot Dubock; Paladino	Beat Butcha; Daringer	3:13
4.	"Dough & Damani"	Price; Daniel Alan Maman; Paladino	Alchemist; Daringer	5:02
5.	"Juvenile Hell" (featuring Flee Lord, Havoc and Lloyd Banks)	Price; David Paul Cordova; Kejuan Muchita; Christopher Lloyd	Havoc	3:36
6.	"Words From Shay" (Interlude)	Demetrius Robinson		1:21
7.	"Front Lines"	Price; Dubock; Ethan Mates	Beat Butcha; Signalflow Music	3:55
8.	"Anza" (featuring Armani Caesar)	Price; Joclyn Clyburn; Shane Lee Lindstrom	Murda Beatz	3:34
9.	"Seen Everything but Jesus" (featuring Freddie Gibbs)	Price; Fredrick Tipton; Dubock	Beat Butcha	4:22
10.	"Words From Shay" (Interlude 2)	Robinson		0:29
11.	"Spurs 3" (featuring Benny the Butcher and Westside Gunn)	Price; Jeremie Pennick; Alvin Worthy; Dubock	Beat Butcha	4:27
12.	"Forever Droppin Tears" (featuring El Camino)	Price; Demetrius Jackson; Erick Sermon; Dana Stinson; Robinson	Erick Sermon; Rockwilder	7:56
13.	"Jesus Khrysis"	Price; Christopher Tyson	Khrysis	2:17
14.	"Nothin Less"	Price; Christopher E. Martin	DJ Premier	2:48
Total length:				49:39

Deluxe edition
No.	Title	Writer(s)	Producer(s)	Length
15.	"Raw Oysters"	Demond Price; Paladino	Daringer	3:45
16.	"Ameenah's Van"	Price; Carl McCormick; Christian Ward	Cardiak; Hitmaka	2:54
17.	"Crack in the Nineties" (featuring Jae Skeese & 7xvethegenius)	Price; Rahkeim Meyer	Roc Marciano	5:39
18.	"Serena vs. Venus"	Price; Patrick Douthit	9th Wonder	3:23
19.	"Stefon Diggs" (featuring Jae Skeese)	Price; Paladino	Daringer	2:55
Total length:				68:15

== Charts ==
Chart performance for From King to a God
Chart (2020)	Peak position
US Billboard 200	126
US Independent Albums (Billboard)	25
US Heatseekers Albums (Billboard)	1
