= Won't He Do It (album) =

Studio album by Conway the Machine
- Released: May 5, 2023
- Genre: East Coast hip-hop
- Length: 49:19
- Labels: Drumwork; EMPIRE
- Producers: Alessandro Colombini; Cozmo; Crazy Mike; Daniel Cruz; Daringer; E. Jones; G Koop; Graymatter; Håkon Graf; J.U.S.T.I.C.E. League; Jason Wool; JR Swiftz; Juicy J; Khrysis; Mario Luciano

Conway the Machine studio album chronology
| God Don't Make Mistakes (2022) | Won't He Do It (2023) | Slant Face Killah (2024) |

Conway the Machine full chronology
| Pain Provided Profit (2023) | Won't He Do It (2023) | Speshal Machinery (2023) |

Singles from Won't He Do It
- 1. "Super Bowl" Released: February 24, 2023; 2. "Brucifix" Released: April 7, 2023; 3. "Quarters" Released: April 7, 2023; 4. "The Chosen" Released: April 28, 2023

Professional ratings
Review scores
| Source | Rating |
|---|---|
| Clash | 8/10 |
| HipHopDX | 4.3/5 stars |

Won't He Do It is the third studio album by American rapper Conway the Machine. It was released through Drumwork Music Group and Empire Distribution on May 5, 2023. The album was preceded by four singles, "Super Bowl", "Brucifix", "Quarters" and "The Chosen". It features notable guest appearances by Benny the Butcher, Dave East, Fabolous, Jozzy, Juicy J and Sauce Walka. It is his first studio album since his official departure from Shady Records and Griselda Records. Critics have characterized Won't He Do It as a highlight in Conway's catalog.

== Background ==
On February 21, 2022, Conway the Machine announced his departure from Shady Records and Griselda Records four days before the release of his second studio album, God Don't Make Mistakes, by the two labels. Shortly after that album's release, Conway revealed Won't He Do It as the planned title for his next album. Conway has described the album title as an acknowledgement of "all that God has blessed [him] with" during his career.

Throughout much of 2022, Conway prioritized the expansion of his Drumwork Music Group label over working on music, stating that rap was becoming "boring" to him due to the proliferation of Griselda-influenced musicians. However, after witnessing the development of the artists on his label, Conway found himself inspired once more. Conway traveled to Denver to record the album; he spent several months there, recording prolifically, and developed Won't He Do It by narrowing down that body of material.

In February 2023, Conway released the album's debut single, "Super Bowl", and announced a release date of March 31, 2023. However, the release date was subsequently delayed to May 5, 2023. Throughout April 2023, Conway released three additional singles: "Quarters", "Brucifix", and "The Chosen".

The album cover features a direct view of Conway's face, something he had not shown on any of his previous albums or mixtapes.

== Content ==
Conway has described the mood of Won't He Do It as more triumphant than his previous work, contrasting it in particular to his prior studio album, God Don't Make Mistakes:

With Won't He Do It I wanted it to be the total opposite [of God Don't Make Mistakes]. I didn't wanna get too deep into the pain of the songs. I didn't want the sad story. We went from all that to a life of luxury! We're thankful, we're blessed, and it's all a positive mindset now.

Sonically, the album centers features like "opulent horns and soaring orchestral compositions", but has been described as refining his traditional boom bap production rather than changing it dramatically. Lyrically, the project features Conway continuing to provide his characteristic "grimy" rapping while also "embrac[ing] his status as a boss".

At various points in the album, Conway recalls interactions he has had with artists he looks up to; he discusses conversations with Kanye West on "Kanye" and with Jay-Z on "Monogram".

== Track listing ==
Won't He Do It track listing
| No. | Title | Writer(s) | Producer(s) | Length |
|---|---|---|---|---|
| 1. | "Quarters" | Demond Price; Christopher Frederick Tyson | Khrysis | 2:28 |
| 2. | "Brucifix" (with Westside Gunn) | Price; Alvin Lamar Worthy; Thomas Paladino; Mario Mellier | Daringer; Alessandro Colombini | 3:10 |
| 3. | "Monogram" | Price; Paladino | Daringer | 2:25 |
| 4. | "Stab Out" (with Ransom) | Price; Randy Nichols; Jayquawn Page | JR Swiftz | 3:07 |
| 5. | "Flesh of My Flesh" | Price; Paladino; Håkon Graf; Jon Eberson | Daringer; Håkon Graf | 3:07 |
| 6. | "Kanye" (with GooseByTheWay & Drea D’Nur) | Price; Erik Ortiz; Kevin Crowe; Rod Bonner; Anthony Goodwin; Drea D’Nur; Elijah Hooks | J.U.S.T.I.C.E. League | 3:03 |
| 7. | "The Chosen" (with Jae Skeese) | Price; Ortiz; Crowe; Jae Skeese; Jimmy Hotz | J.U.S.T.I.C.E. League | 2:55 |
| 8. | "Water to Wine" (with GooseByTheWay, Jozzy & Dave East) | Price; Goodwin; Jocelyn Adriene Donald; David Lawrence Brewster, Jr. | E. Jones | 5:08 |
| 9. | "Kill Judas" | Price; Paladino | Daringer | 0:58 |
| 10. | "Brick Fare" | Price; Paladino | Daringer; Mario Luciano; Jason Wool | 4:39 |
| 11. | "Brooklyn Chop House" (with Fabolous & Benny the Butcher) | Price; John David Jackson; Jeremie Damon Pennick; Paladino | Daringer | 4:53 |
| 12. | "Tween Cross Tween" (with GooseByTheWay) | Price; Goodwin | Graymatter | 4:02 |
| 13. | "Won't He Do It" (with 7xvethegenius) | Price; Robert Mandell; Cosmo Hickox; Daniel Cruz | G Koop; Cozmo; Daniel Cruz | 5:30 |
| 14. | "Super Bowl" (with Sauce Walka featuring Juicy J) | Price; Albert Walker Mondane; Jordan Michael Houston III; Michael Anthony Foster; Abdul Kareem Fakir; Lawrence Albert Payton; Lewis Ronald McNeir | Juicy J; Crazy Mike | 3:54 |
| Total length: | | | | 49:19 |

== Charts ==
Chart performance for Won't He Do It
| Chart (2020) | Peak position |
|---|---|
| US Heatseekers Albums (Billboard) | 7 |
