= Conway the Machine =

American rapper (born 1982)

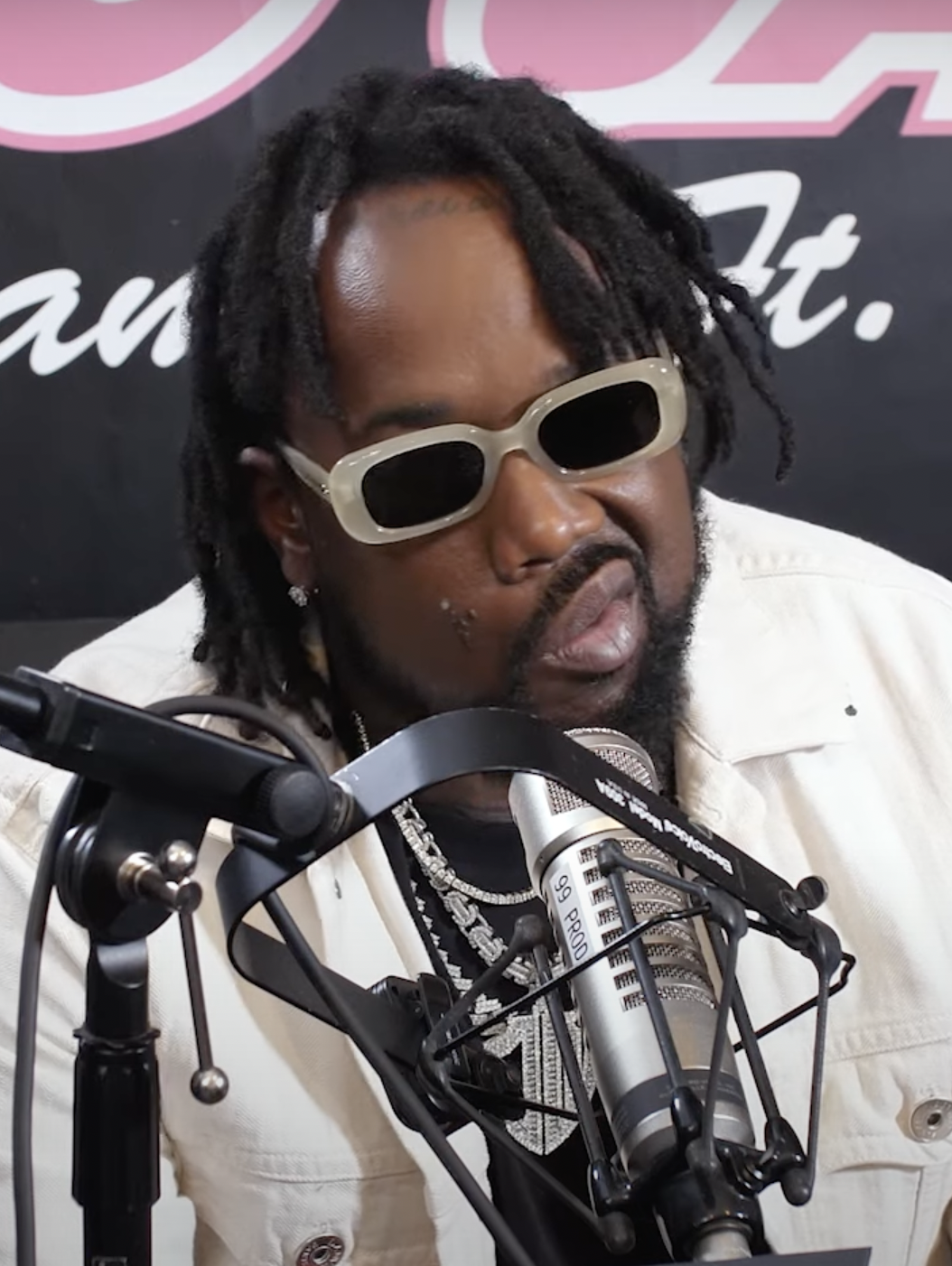
- Conway the Machine in 2022

Background information
- Also known as: Conway; Nash; Kannon
- Born: Demond Price; February 16, 1982 (age 44); Buffalo, New York, U.S.
- Genre: East Coast hip-hop
- Occupations: Rapper; songwriter; record producer
- Years active: 2005–present
- Labels: Daupe!; Griselda; Shady; Drumwork; Vinyl Digital

Demond Price (born February 16, 1982), known professionally as Conway the Machine, or simply Conway, is an American rapper and co-founder of the hip hop label Griselda Records, alongside his paternal half-brother Westside Gunn. Acclaimed for his 1990s inspired, dark and gritty lyricism, he rose to prominence following his mixtape Reject 2 (2015) and debut studio album From King to a God (2020). His second album, God Don't Make Mistakes (2022), was released by Shady Records, and met with universal acclaim.

Conway announced his departure from Shady and Griselda Records in February 2022, and has since founded his own label, Drumwork. He has since continued his collaborations with Gunn, as well as their cousin Benny the Butcher.

== Career ==
=== 2012–2019: early mixtapes and Shady Records deal ===
Throughout his 20s, Conway was in and out of jail. During this time, he reflected on what he wanted out of life and began to concentrate on music.

In 2012, Conway was shot in the head, neck, and shoulder. Originally, doctors believed that he would be paralyzed from the neck down, however, today the only permanent injury is his face being partially paralyzed, giving him his signature slur.

In 2014, Westside Gunn founded Griselda Records, through which Conway and Westside Gunn would self-release their own projects and the works of artists such as Benny the Butcher and Mach-Hommy. In 2015, Conway released his first two official mixtape projects through Griselda Records, The Devil's Reject and Reject 2. Conway and Westside Gunn also released two collaborative EPs through London-based record label Daupe!, the first of which was 2015's Hall & Nash, followed by 2016's Griselda Ghost. In April 2016, during Mobb Deep and Smif-N-Wessun's "Hell On Earth" tour, Conway was introduced to Prodigy of Mobb Deep, who would become one of his earliest notable collaborators and supporters.

On March 3, 2017, Griselda Records signed a deal with Eminem's Shady Records. On October 10, 2017, Conway contributed an a cappella rap verse to the 2017 BET Hip Hop Awards Shady cypher. The same year, Complex included Westside Gunn and Conway in their list of "15 Best Unofficial Rap Duos in the Game", as well as two of the "17 Artists to Watch in 2017".

Following Griselda's deal with Shady Records, Conway's first official release was G.O.A.T. on December 21, 2017, which included production from Griselda's in-house producer Daringer and The Alchemist, and featured Royce Da 5'9", Raekwon, Prodigy, Styles P and Lloyd Banks. Earlier in 2017, he released a collaborative mixtape with DJ Green Lantern titled More Steroids.

=== 2019–present: studio albums ===
On May 16, 2019, Conway, Benny The Butcher and Westside Gunn released their first single with DJ Premier titled "Headlines".

Conway released "Bang", at the time expected to be the first single from his album God Don't Make Mistakes, alongside Eminem, on July 19, 2019. God Don't Make Mistakes had been intended to be Conway's debut studio album, and Westside Gunn had stated it was "90 percent complete" in 2018; however, Conway's first studio album would instead be the project From King to a God, which he released on September 11, 2020. He released the mixtape La Maquina in April 2021.

God Don't Make Mistakes was ultimately released on February 25, 2022, as Conway's second studio album. It was followed by his third studio album, Won't He Do It, released on May 5, 2023, being Conway's first studio album not released with Griselda. He also released Palermo (2023), a collaborative album with German record producer Wun Two, through Vinyl Digital.

Conway released Slant Face Killah on May 10, 2024. His fifth solo studio album, You Can't Kill God with Bullets, was released on December 12, 2025.

== Discography ==
Solo studio albums

- From King to a God (2020)
- God Don't Make Mistakes (2022)
- Won't He Do It (2023)
- Slant Face Killah (2024)
- You Can't Kill God with Bullets (2025)
- OTIS (2026)
