= Beat Butcha =

British record producer

- Born: Eliot Peter Phillip Dubock; June 23, 1982 (age 43); London, England
- Genres: Hip hop; boom bap; R&B; soul
- Occupations: Record producer; disc jockey; songwriter

Eliot Dubock, best known as Beat Butcha, is an English record producer, disc jockey and songwriter best known for his production work for SZA, The Carters, Brent Faiyaz, Dreamville, Banks, $uicideboy$, Tyler, the Creator, and various members of the New York-based Griselda Records hip-hop collective, among others.

== Beginnings ==
Dubock began producing as a disc jockey at the age of 16 in Southeast London, which led to him crafting remixes for several hometown acts, including Jehst, Terra Firma, and more, as well as early production credits on rapper Braintax's 2006 album Panorama. Dubock next had a chance encounter with Brooklyn-based MC Pumpkinhead, who allowed Dubock to send several beats he had created, one of which became "Battering Bars" featuring rapper Sean Price. Price would contact Dubock directly a week later for additional productions, which were subsequently placed on Price's acclaimed project Mic Tyson.

== Awards and nominations ==
Year	Ceremony	Award	Result	Ref
2019	61st Annual Grammy Awards	Grammy Award for Best Urban Contemporary Album (Everything Is Love) ^{A}	Won	
2022	64th Annual Grammy Awards	Grammy Award for Best Rap Album (Call Me If You Get Lost) ^{B}	Won	

=== Notes ===
A. ^{A} Winning producers in this category with less than a 50% album contribution are awarded with a Winner's Certificate.
B. ^{B} Winning producers in this category with less than a 50% album contribution are awarded with a Winner's Certificate.
