= Trippie Redd discography =

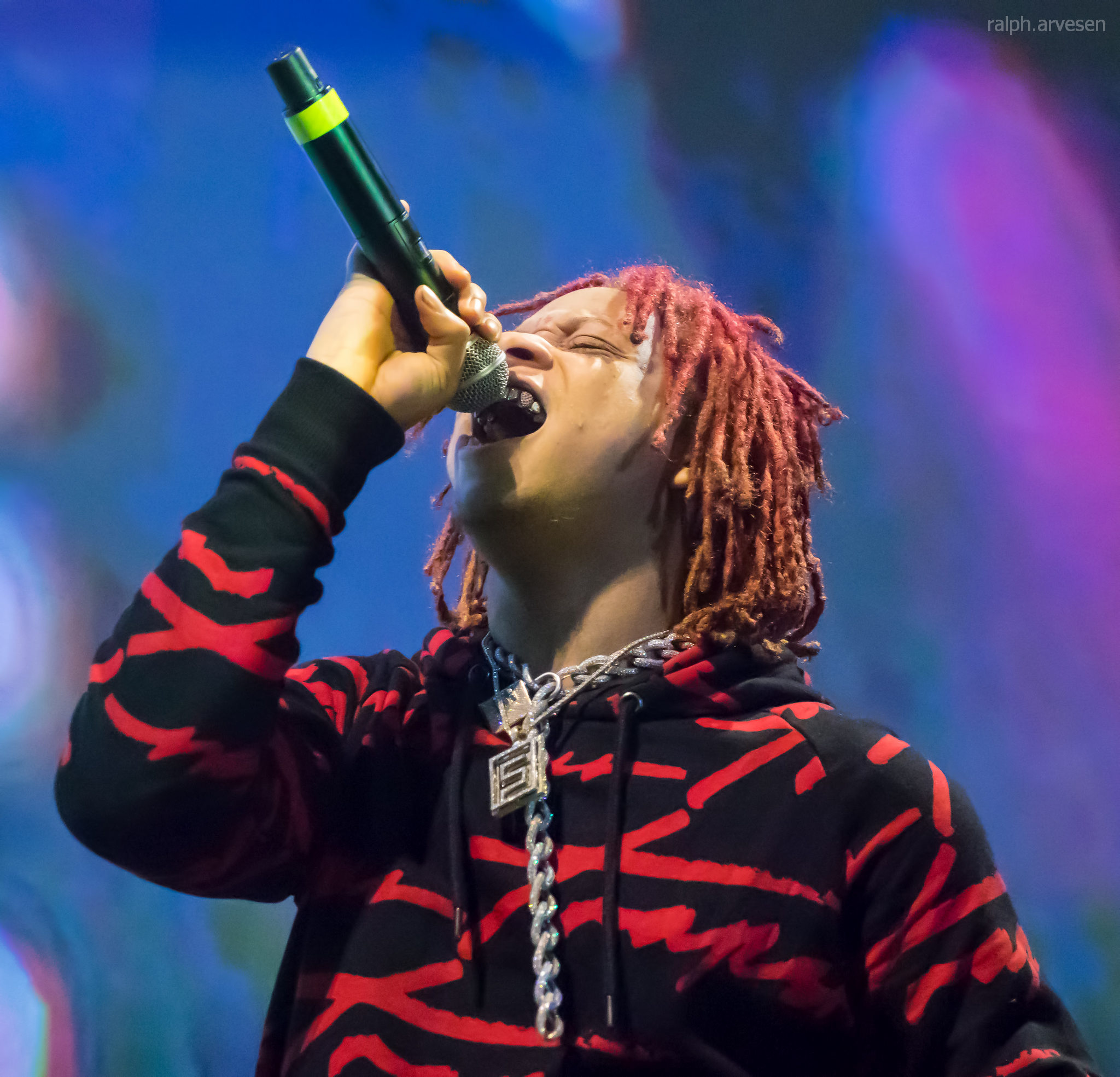
- Redd performing in 2018
- Studio albums: 7
- EPs: 9
- Singles: 38
- Mixtapes: 6

The discography of American rapper Trippie Redd consists of seven studio albums, two deluxe albums, six mixtapes, eight extended plays and 31 singles (including 15 as a featured artist).

Redd's first release was the EP Awakening My InnerBeast, released on August 25, 2016. He released several more EPs throughout 2016 and early 2017 before he issued his first mixtape, A Love Letter to You, on May 21, 2017, which became his first release to chart on a major chart, peaking on the US Billboard 200 at number 69. He subsequently issued the singles "Love Scars" and "Poles 1469" from the mixtape, both of which appeared on the Bubbling Under Hot 100 chart. Redd followed the mixtape with its sequel, A Love Letter to You 2, which peaked at number 34 on the Billboard 200 in October 2017.

Later in 2017, he was feature on the certified Diamond Record "Fuck Love", and would drop "Dark Knight Dummo", featuring fellow American rapper and singer Travis Scott, became Redd's first song to chart on the US Billboard Hot 100, peaking at number 72. The song was the lead single from his debut album Life's a Trip, which was released on August 10, 2018. The album appeared in the top 20 of various charts around the world, including the UK and Australia. Redd later issued the single "Taking a Walk", which appeared on the Billboard Hot 100 at number 46. Also in 2018, he issued the single "Topanga" from his third mixtape A Love Letter to You 3. The mixtape became his highest entry on the Billboard 200, debuting at number three, while "Topanga" moved to number 52 on the Billboard Hot 100 in the same week.

== Albums ==
=== Studio albums ===
List of studio albums, with selected chart positions and certifications
| Title | Album details | Peak chart positions | | | | | | | | | | Certifications |
| Title | Album details | US | AUS | CAN | FIN | GER | NOR | NZ | SWE | SWI | UK | Certifications |
|---|---|---|---|---|---|---|---|---|---|---|---|---|
| Life's a Trip | Released: August 10, 2018; Label: 10K, 1400; Format: CD, LP, digital download, streaming | 4 | 14 | 5 | 29 | 98 | 10 | 11 | 22 | 39 | 19 | RIAA: Platinum; BPI: Silver; MC: Platinum |
| ! | Released: August 9, 2019; Label: 10K, 1400; Format: CD, LP, digital download, streaming | 3 | 24 | 10 | 37 | 79 | 8 | 10 | 51 | 32 | 19 | |
| Pegasus | Released: October 30, 2020; Label: 10K, 1400; Format: CD, LP, digital download, streaming | 2 | 60 | 6 | — | — | 14 | 32 | — | 56 | 79 | RIAA: Gold |
| Trip at Knight | Released: August 20, 2021; Label: 10K, 1400; Format: CD, LP, digital download, streaming | 2 | 9 | 4 | 42 | 47 | 5 | 5 | 31 | 6 | 15 | RIAA: Gold; MC: Gold |
| Mansion Musik | Released: January 20, 2023; Label: 10K, 1400; Format: Digital download, streaming | 3 | 73 | 9 | — | 51 | 29 | 40 | — | 19 | 79 | |
| NDA | Released: August 14, 2026; Label: 10K, 1400; Format: Digital download, streaming | 50 | — | — | — | — | — | — | — | — | — | |

=== Deluxe albums ===
| Title | Album details |
|---|---|
| Neon Shark vs Pegasus | Released: February 19, 2021; Label: 10K, 1400; Format: CD, LP, digital download, streaming |
| Saint Michael V2 | Released: November 24, 2023; Label: 10K, 1400; Format: Digital download, streaming |
| #NDA | Released: August 28, 2026; Label: 10K, 1400; Formats: Digital download, streaming |

== Mixtapes ==
List of mixtapes, with selected chart positions and certifications
| Title | Mixtape details | Peak chart positions | | | | | | | | | Certifications |
| Title | Mixtape details | US | US R&B /HH | AUS | CAN | NOR | NZ | SWE | SWI | UK | Certifications |
|---|---|---|---|---|---|---|---|---|---|---|---|
| A Love Letter to You | Released: May 12, 2017; Label: 10K; Format: LP, digital download, streaming | 64 | 32 | — | — | — | — | — | — | — | RIAA: Platinum; MC: Gold |
| A Love Letter to You 2 | Released: October 6, 2017; Label: 10K; Format: LP, digital download, streaming | 34 | 19 | — | — | — | — | — | — | — | |
| A Love Letter to You 3 | Released: November 9, 2018; Label: 10K; Format: CD, LP, digital download, streaming | 3 | 1 | 36 | 10 | 14 | 20 | 30 | 62 | 31 | RIAA: Platinum; MC: Gold |
| A Love Letter to You 4 | Released: November 22, 2019; Label: 10K; Format: CD, LP, digital download, streaming | 1 | 1 | 47 | 6 | 12 | 17 | — | 43 | 32 | RIAA: Platinum; BPI: Silver; MC: Platinum |
| Hate Is Dead | Released: December 20, 2021; Label: 10K, 1400; Format: Streaming | — | — | — | — | — | — | — | — | — | |
| A Love Letter to You 5 | Released: August 11, 2023; Label: 10K, 1400; Format: CD, LP, digital download, streaming | 13 | 3 | — | 78 | — | 32 | — | — | — | |

== Extended plays ==
List of extended plays, with selected chart positions
| Title | EP details | Peak chart positions | |
| Title | EP details | US | CAN |
|---|---|---|---|
| Awakening My InnerBeast | Released: August 27, 2016; Label: 10K; Format: Digital download | — | — |
| Beast Mode ++++ (with Pi'erre Bourne) | Released: October 19, 2016; Label: 10K; Format: Digital download | — | — |
| Rock the World, Trippie | Released: November 13, 2016; Label: 10K; Format: Digital download | — | — |
| White Room Project | Released: January 19, 2017; Label: 10K; Format: Digital download | — | — |
| A Love Letter You'll Never Get | Released: August 30, 2017; Label: 10K; Format: Digital download | — | — |
| Angels & Demons (with Lil Wop) | Released: October 31, 2017; Label: 10K; Format: Digital download | — | — |
| TR666+!$ 1400/800 | Released: July 25, 2018; Label: 10K; Format: Digital download | — | — |
| Spooky Sounds | Released: October 23, 2020; Label: 10K; Format: Digital download | — | — |
| First Draft | Released: September 30, 2022; Label: 10K; Format: Digital download | — | — |
| Saint Michael | Released: November 10, 2023; Label: 10K; Format: Digital download | 161 | — |
| Genre: Sadboy (with MGK) | Released: March 29, 2024; Label: Interscope; Format: CD, LP, digital download, streaming | 30 | 98 |

== Singles ==
=== As lead artist ===
| Title | Year | Peak chart positions | | | | | | | Certifications | Album |
| Title | Year | US | US R&B/HH | AUS | CAN | NZ Hot | UK | WW | Certifications | Album |
|---|---|---|---|---|---|---|---|---|---|---|
| "Love Scars" | 2016 | — (Note: "Love Scars" did not enter the Billboard Hot 100, but peaked at number 15 on the Bubbling Under Hot 100 chart.) | — (Note: "Love Scars" did not enter the Billboard Hot R&B/Hip-Hop Songs chart, but peaked at number one on the Bubbling Under R&B/Hip-Hop Singles chart.) | — | — | — | — | — | RIAA: 2× Platinum; BPI: Silver; MC: 2× Platinum; RMNZ: Gold | A Love Letter to You |
| "Poles 1469" (featuring 6ix9ine) | 2017 | — (Note: "Poles1469" did not enter the Billboard Hot 100, but peaked at number eight on the Bubbling Under Hot 100 chart.) | 44 | — | — | — | — | — | RIAA: Platinum; MC: Platinum; RMNZ: Gold | A Love Letter to You |
| "It Takes Time" | 2017 | — | — | — | — | — | — | — | | A Love Letter to You |
| "Chair Falling" | 2017 | — | — | — | — | — | — | — | | Non-album single |
| "Bust Down" | 2017 | — | — | — | — | — | — | — | RIAA: Platinum; MC: Gold | A Love Letter to You 2 |
| "Dark Knight Dummo" (featuring Travis Scott) | 2017 | 72 | 29 | — | 93 | — (Note: "Dark Knight Dummo" did not enter the NZ Top 40 Singles Chart, but peaked at number nine on the NZ Heatseeker Singles Chart.) | — | — | RIAA: 3× Platinum; BPI: Silver; MC: 3× Platinum; RMNZ: Platinum | Life's a Trip |
| "18" (with Kris Wu, Rich Brian, Joji and Baauer) | 2018 | — | — | — | — | — | — | — | | Non-album single |
| "How You Feel" | 2018 | — | — | — | — | — | — | — | | Life's a Trip |
| "Me Likey" | 2018 | — | — | — | — | — | — | — | | Non-album single |
| "Taking a Walk" | 2018 | 46 | 22 | — | 49 | 4 | 80 | — | RIAA: 3× Platinum; BPI: Silver; MC: 3× Platinum; RMNZ: Platinum | Life's a Trip |
| "Topanga" | 2018 | 52 | 23 | — | 68 | 14 | 88 | — | RIAA: 2× Platinum; BPI: Silver; MC: 2× Platinum; RMNZ: Platinum | A Love Letter to You 3 |
| "Under Enemy Arms" | 2019 | 94 | 39 | — | — | 11 | — | — | RIAA: Gold | ! |
| "Mac 10" (featuring Lil Baby and Lil Duke) | 2019 | 64 | 24 | — | 93 | 30 | — | — | RIAA: Platinum | ! |
| "Love Me More" | 2019 | 79 | 37 | — | 100 | 17 | — | — | RIAA: Platinum; MC: Gold | A Love Letter to You 4 |
| "Death" (featuring DaBaby) | 2019 | 59 | 26 | — | 58 | — | — | — | RIAA: Platinum; MC: Gold | A Love Letter to You 4 |
| "Who Needs Love" | 2019 | 58 | 26 | — | 75 | 21 | — | — | RIAA: Platinum; MC: Gold; RMNZ: Gold | A Love Letter to You 4 |
| "Yell Oh" (featuring Young Thug) | 2020 | — | — | — | — | 25 | — | — | | A Love Letter to You 4 |
| "The Way" (featuring Russ) | 2020 | — | — | — | — | 25 | — | — | | A Love Letter to You 4 |
| "Excitement" (with PartyNextDoor) | 2020 | — (Note: "Excitement" did not enter the Billboard Hot 100, but peaked at number two on the Bubbling Under Hot 100 chart.) | 39 | — | — | 14 | — | — | RIAA: Platinum; BPI: Silver; MC: Platinum; RMNZ: Platinum | Pegasus |
| "Tell Me U Luv Me" (with Juice Wrld) | 2020 | 38 | 15 | — | 40 | 2 | 56 | — | RIAA: Platinum; BPI: Silver | Legends Never Die |
| "Dreamer" | 2020 | — | — | — | — | 34 | — | — | | Neon Shark vs Pegasus |
| "Cash Only" (with Blac Chyna) | 2020 | — | — | — | — | — | — | — | | TBA |
| "I Got You" (with Busta Rhymes) | 2020 | — | — | — | — | 15 | — | — | | Pegasus |
| "Sleepy Hollow" | 2020 | — (Note: "Sleepy Hollow" did not enter the Billboard Hot 100, but peaked at number six on the Bubbling Under Hot 100 chart.) | 46 | — | — | 14 | — | — | | Pegasus |
| "Miss the Rage" (with Playboi Carti) | 2021 | 11 | 6 | 31 | 15 | 2 | 32 | 13 | RIAA: 2× Platinum; BPI: Silver; MC: 2× Platinum; RMNZ: Platinum | Trip at Knight |
| "Holy Smokes" (featuring Lil Uzi Vert) | 2021 | 50 | 17 | — | 65 | 9 | — | 72 | RIAA: Gold | Trip at Knight |
| "The Mob" (with YNW Melly & YNW BSlime featuring YNW Bortlen) | 2022 | — | — | — | — | — | — | — | | Non-album singles |
| "American Psycho" (with Marshmello and Mae Muller) | 2022 | — | — | — | — | 34 | — | — | | Non-album singles |
| "Big 14" (with Offset featuring Moneybagg Yo) | 2022 | 96 | 37 | — | 95 | 13 | — | — | | Non-album singles |
| "Ain't Safe" (featuring Don Toliver) | 2022 | 92 | 25 | — | — | 10 | — | — | | Non-album singles |
| "Krzy Train" (with Travis Scott) | 2023 | 90 | 35 | — | — | 19 | — | — | | Mansion Musik |
| "Took My Breath Away" (with Skye Morales) | 2023 | — | — | — | — | 26 | — | — | | A Love Letter to You 5 |
| "Hurts Me" (with Tory Lanez) | 2023 | — (Note: "Hurts Me" did not enter the Billboard Hot 100, but peaked at number five on the Bubbling Under Hot 100 chart.) | — | — | 85 | 9 | 90 | — | BPI: Silver; RMNZ: Gold | A Love Letter to You 5 |
| "Last Days" | 2023 | — | — | — | — | 30 | — | — | | A Love Letter to You 5 |
| "Left 4 Dead" | 2023 | — | — | — | — | — | — | — | | A Love Letter to You 5 |
| "LWRW" | 2024 | — | — | — | — | 37 | — | — | | Non-album singles |
| "Bando Kid" | 2024 | — | — | — | — | — | — | — | | Non-album singles |
| "LGLG" | 2024 | — | — | — | — | — | — | — | | Non-album singles |
| "Woke Up" | 2025 | — | — | — | — | — | — | — | | Non-album singles |
| "The Face" | 2025 | — | — | — | — | — | — | — | | Non-album singles |
| "World Boss" | 2025 | — | — | — | — | — | — | — | | Non-album singles |
| "Sketchy" | 2025 | — | — | — | — | — | — | — | | Non-album singles |
| "Checklist" | 2025 | — | — | — | — | — | — | — | | Non-album singles |
| "Stay the Same" | 2025 | — | — | — | — | — | — | — | | Non-album singles |
| "Can't Count Me Out" | 2025 | — | — | — | — | — | — | — | | Non-album singles |
| "Paperbag Boy" (with Young Thug) | 2026 | — | — | — | — | — | — | — | | Non-album singles |

=== As featured artist ===
List of singles as a featured artist, with selected chart positions, showing year released and album name
| Title | Year | Peak chart positions | | | | | | | | | | Certifications | Album |
| Title | Year | US | US R&B/HH | AUS | CAN | HUN | IRE | ITA | SWE | SWI | UK | Certifications | Album |
|---|---|---|---|---|---|---|---|---|---|---|---|---|---|
| "Like That" (Evvv featuring Trippie Redd, BooCa$h & Lil Jeffo) | 2015 | — | — | — | — | — | — | — | — | — | — | | Non-album singles |
| "Anything for the Dolla" (Chaz Homi featuring Trippie Redd) | 2016 | — | — | — | — | — | — | — | — | — | — | | Non-album singles |
| "Sauce" (Gway featuring Trippie Redd) | 2017 | — | — | — | — | — | — | — | — | — | — | | The G Way |
| "Trap" (Segaanotha1 featuring Trippie Redd and LilWop17) | 2017 | — | — | — | — | — | — | — | — | — | — | | Non-album singles |
| "Hang Wit" (AyeYoQue featuring Trippie Redd) | 2017 | — | — | — | — | — | — | — | — | — | — | | Non-album singles |
| "Ill Nana" (DRAM featuring Trippie Redd) | 2017 | — | — | — | — | — | — | — | — | — | — | | Big Baby D.R.A.M. |
| "Fuck Love" (XXXTentacion featuring Trippie Redd) | 2017 | 28 | 18 | — | 31 | — | 51 | 63 | — | 88 | 89 | RIAA: 11× Platinum; BPI: Silver; RMNZ: 3× Platinum | 17 |
| "High" (Alison Wonderland featuring Trippie Redd) | 2018 | — | — | — | — | — | — | — | — | — | — | | Awake |
| "Bool" (Chris King featuring Trippie Redd, Mozzy and YG) | 2018 | — | — | — | — | — | — | — | — | — | — | | Non-album single |
| "Wish" (Diplo featuring Trippie Redd) | 2018 | 79 | 17 | — | 90 | — (Note: "Wish" did not enter the NZ Top 40 Singles Chart or Hot Singles Chart, but peaked at number eight on the NZ Heatseeker Singles Chart.) | — | — | — | — | — | RIAA: Platinum; BPI: Gold; RMNZ: Platinum | California and Life's a Trip (Note: "Wish" is credited as a "Trippie Mix" on Life's a Trip.) |
| "Man Down" (Sunny 2point0 featuring Trippie Redd) | 2018 | — | — | — | — | — | — | — | — | — | — | | Non-album single |
| "Fires & Desires" (Lil Twist featuring Lil Wayne and Trippie Redd) | 2018 | — | — | — | — | — | — | — | — | — | — | | Young Carter 2 |
| "Paris Shadows" (Paris Shadows featuring Trippie Redd) | 2018 | — | — | — | — | — | — | — | — | — | — | | One Night in Paris |
| "Jump" (Julia Michaels featuring Trippie Redd) | 2018 | — | — | — | — | — | — | — | — (Note: "Jump" did not enter the Swedish Singellista Chart, but peaked at number 17 on the Swedish Heatseeker Chart.) | — | — | ARIA: Gold; MC: Gold | Non-album single |
| "Love & Drugz II" (Kodie Shane featuring Trippie Redd) | 2018 | — | — | — | — | — | — | — | — | — | — | | Young HeartThrob |
| "Swimming" (Baby Goth featuring Trippie Redd and Lil Xan) | 2018 | — | — | — | — | — | — | — | — | — | — | | Baby Goth |
| "Ferris Wheel" (Tory Lanez featuring Trippie Redd) | 2019 | — (Note: "Ferris Wheel" did not enter the Billboard Hot 100, but peaked at number five on the Bubbling Under Hot 100 chart.) | 49 | — | — | — | — | — | — | — | — | RIAA: Gold | Love Me Now? |
| "Alright" (Wiz Khalifa featuring Trippie Redd and Preme) | 2019 | — | — | — | — | — | — | — | — | — | — | | Non-album singles |
| "Built for It" (OG Maco featuring Trippie Redd and UnotheActivist) | 2019 | — | — | — | — | — | — | — | — | — | — | | Non-album singles |
| "Gone Girl" (Iann Dior featuring Trippie Redd) | 2019 | — | — | — | — | — | — | — | — | — | — | RIAA: Platinum; ARIA: Gold; RMNZ: Gold | Industry Plant |
| "Bad Vibes Forever" (XXXTentacion featuring PnB Rock and Trippie Redd) | 2019 | 85 | 39 | — | 85 | — | 82 | — | — | — | — | BPI: Silver; RMNZ: Gold | Bad Vibes Forever |
| "No Rap Kap" (Kodie Shane featuring Trippie Redd) | 2020 | — | — | — | — | — | — | — | — | — | — | | Non-album single |
| "No Service in the Hills" (Cheat Codes featuring Trippie Redd, Blackbear and Prince$$ Rosie) | 2020 | — | — | — | — | — | — | — | — | — | — | | Hellraisers, Pt. 2 |
| "Wake Up Call" (KSI featuring Trippie Redd) | 2020 | — | — | 92 | 85 | 26 | 23 | — | — | — | 11 | BPI: Silver | Dissimulation |
| "Swimming" (IV4 featuring Trippie Redd) | 2020 | — | — | — | — | — | — | — | — | — | — | | Non-album singles |
| "I Dont Want Another Sorry" (Dax featuring Trippie Redd) | 2020 | — | — | — | — | — | — | — | — | — | — | | Non-album singles |
| "Head$hot!" (Kashdami featuring Trippie Redd) | 2021 | — | — | — | — | — | — | — | — | — | — | | HYPERNOVA |
| "Missiles" (Lil Gnar featuring Trippie Redd) | 2021 | — | — | — | — | — | — | — | — | — | — | | Die Bout It |
| "ESCAPE YOUR LOVE (Remix)" (SSGKobe featuring Trippie Redd) | 2022 | — | — | — | — | — | — | — | — | — | — | | Non-album single |
| "All Night" (S-X featuring Trippie Redd) | 2022 | — | — | — | — | — | — | — | — | — | — | | Things Change |
| "Thick of It" (KSI featuring Trippie Redd) | 2024 | 64 | 21 | 29 | 31 | — | 14 | — | 48 | — | 6 | ARIA: Platinum; BPI: Gold | TBA |
| "Radio" (Steve Aoki featuring Trippie Redd, Jessica Baio and Kabu) | 2025 | — | — | — | — | — | — | — | — | — | — | | Non-album single |
"—" denotes a recording that did not chart or was not released in that territory.

== Other charted and certified songs ==
| Title | Year | Peak chart positions | | | | | | | Certifications | Album |
| Title | Year | US | US R&B/ HH | US Rock | CAN | NZ Hot | UK | WW | Certifications | Album |
|---|---|---|---|---|---|---|---|---|---|---|
| "Love Scars Pt. 2/Rack City" (featuring Antionia and Chris King) | 2017 | — | — | — | — | — | — | — | RIAA: Gold | A Love Letter to You |
| "Romeo & Juliet" | 2017 | — | — | — | — | — | — | — | RIAA: Platinum | A Love Letter to You |
| "It Takes Time" | 2017 | — | — | — | — | — | — | — | RIAA: Platinum | A Love Letter to You |
| "In Too Deep" | 2017 | — | — | — | — | — | — | — | RIAA: Gold | A Love Letter to You 2 |
| "66" (Lil Yachty featuring Trippie Redd) | 2018 | 73 | 36 | — | 74 | — (Note: "66" did not enter the NZ Top 40 Singles Chart or Hot Singles Chart, but peaked at number three on the NZ Heatseeker Singles Chart.) | — | — | RIAA: Platinum | Lil Boat 2 |
| "Early Morning Trappin" (Rich the Kid featuring Trippie Redd) | 2018 | — (Note: "Early Morning Trappin" did not enter the Billboard Hot 100, but peaked at number 15 on the Bubbling Under Hot 100 chart.) | — (Note: "Early Morning Trappin" did not enter the Billboard Hot R&B/Hip-Hop Songs chart, but peaked at number five on the Bubbling Under R&B/Hip-Hop Singles chart.) | — | — | — | — | — | RIAA: Gold | The World Is Yours |
| "Missing My Idols" | 2018 | — (Note: "Missing My Idols" did not enter the Billboard Hot 100, but peaked at number two on the Bubbling Under Hot 100 chart.) | — (Note: "Missing My Idols" did not enter the Billboard Hot R&B/Hip-Hop Songs chart, but peaked at number one on the Bubbling Under R&B/Hip-Hop Singles chart.) | — | — | — | — | — | RIAA: Gold | Life's a Trip |
| "Forever Ever" (featuring Young Thug and Reese Laflare) | 2018 | — (Note: "Forever Ever" did not enter the Billboard Hot 100, but peaked at number 13 on the Bubbling Under Hot 100 chart.) | — | — | — | — | — | — | BPI: Silver; RIAA: Gold | Life's a Trip |
| "Bang!" | 2018 | — (Note: "Bang!" did not enter the Billboard Hot 100, but peaked at number 18 on the Bubbling Under Hot 100 chart.) | — | — | — | — | — | — | RIAA: Platinum | Life's a Trip |
| "Shake It Up" | 2018 | — (Note: "Shake It Up" did not enter the Billboard Hot 100, but peaked at number 17 on the Bubbling Under Hot 100 chart.) | — | — | — | — | — | — | RIAA: Platinum; MC: Gold | Life's a Trip |
| "Murda" (YoungBoy Never Broke Again featuring Trippie Redd) | 2018 | — | — | — | — | — | — | — | RIAA: Gold | Decided |
| "RIP" (Joji featuring Trippie Redd) | 2018 | — | — | — | — | 25 | — | — | | Ballads 1 |
| "Fire Starter" (featuring Emani22) | 2018 | — (Note: "Fire Starter" did not enter the Billboard Hot 100, but peaked at number 24 on the Bubbling Under Hot 100 chart.) | — | — | — | — | — | — | | A Love Letter to You 3 |
| "Toxic Waste" | 2018 | 98 | 48 | — | — | — | — | — | RIAA: Gold | A Love Letter to You 3 |
| "Negative Energy" (featuring Kodie Shane) | 2018 | 89 | 45 | — | — | — | — | — | RIAA: Gold | A Love Letter to You 3 |
| "Can't Love" | 2018 | — (Note: "Can't Love" did not enter the Billboard Hot 100, but peaked at number three on the Bubbling Under Hot 100 chart.) | 50 | — | — | 19 | — | — | RIAA: Gold | A Love Letter to You 3 |
| "Love Scars 3" | 2018 | 73 | 37 | — | — | 12 | — | — | RIAA: Platinum | A Love Letter to You 3 |
| "A.L.L.T.Y. 3" (featuring Baby Goth) | 2018 | — (Note: "A.L.L.T.Y. 3" did not enter the Billboard Hot 100, but peaked at number 20 on the Bubbling Under Hot 100 chart.) | — | — | — | — | — | — | | A Love Letter to You 3 |
| "Elevate & Motivate" (featuring YoungBoy Never Broke Again and Nel-Denarro) | 2018 | — (Note: "Elevate & Motivate" did not enter the Billboard Hot 100, but peaked at number 23 on the Bubbling Under Hot 100 chart.) | — | — | — | — | — | — | | A Love Letter to You 3 |
| "I Tried Loving" | 2018 | — (Note: "I Tried Loving" did not enter the Billboard Hot 100, but peaked at number ten on the Bubbling Under Hot 100 chart.) | — (Note: "I Tried Loving" did not enter the Billboard Hot R&B/Hip-Hop Songs chart, but peaked at number two on the Bubbling Under R&B/Hip-Hop Singles chart.) | — | — | — | — | — | RIAA: Gold | A Love Letter to You 3 |
| "Loyalty Before Royalty" | 2018 | — (Note: "Loyalty Before Royalty" did not enter the Billboard Hot 100, but peaked at number 19 on the Bubbling Under Hot 100 chart.) | — (Note: "Loyalty Before Royalty" did not enter the Billboard Hot R&B/Hip-Hop Songs chart, but peaked at number five on the Bubbling Under R&B/Hip-Hop Singles chart.) | — | — | — | — | — | RIAA: Gold | A Love Letter to You 3 |
| "1400 / 999 Freestyle" (featuring Juice Wrld) | 2018 | 55 | 24 | — | 76 | 7 | — | — | RIAA: 3× Platinum; BPI: Silver; MC: 3× Platinum; RMNZ: Platinum | A Love Letter to You 3 |
| "Candy" (Machine Gun Kelly featuring Trippie Redd) | 2019 | — (Note: "Candy" did not enter the Billboard Hot 100, but peaked at number eight on the Bubbling Under Hot 100 chart.) | 49 | — | 81 | 21 | — | — | RIAA: Platinum; BPI: Silver; RMNZ: Gold | Hotel Diablo |
| "!" | 2019 | — (Note: "!" did not enter the Billboard Hot 100, but peaked at number 12 on the Bubbling Under Hot 100 chart.) | — (Note: "!" did not enter the Billboard Hot R&B/Hip-Hop Songs chart, but peaked at number two on the Bubbling Under R&B/Hip-Hop Singles chart.) | — | — | 11 | — | — | | ! |
| "Snake Skin" | 2019 | 87 | 34 | — | — | 12 | — | — | | ! |
| "They Afraid of You" (featuring Playboi Carti) | 2019 | — (Note: "They Afraid of You" did not enter the Billboard Hot 100, but peaked at number 21 on the Bubbling Under Hot 100 chart.) | — | — | — | 17 | — | — | | ! |
| "Immortal" (featuring The Game) | 2019 | — | — | — | — | 23 | — | — | | ! |
| "Leray" | 2019 | — (Note: "Leray" did not enter the Billboard Hot 100, but peaked at number 25 on the Bubbling Under Hot 100 chart.) | — | — | — | 33 | — | — | RIAA: Gold | A Love Letter to You 4 |
| "Love Sick" | 2019 | — (Note: "Love Sick" did not enter the Billboard Hot 100, but peaked at number nine on the Bubbling Under Hot 100 chart.) | — (Note: "Love Sick" did not enter the Billboard Hot R&B/Hip-Hop Songs chart, but peaked at number three on the Bubbling Under R&B/Hip-Hop Singles chart.) | — | — | 29 | — | — | RIAA: Gold | A Love Letter to You 4 |
| "6 Kiss" (featuring Juice Wrld and YNW Melly) | 2019 | 60 | 28 | — | 64 | 15 | — | — | RIAA: Platinum; MC: Gold | A Love Letter to You 4 |
| "Hate Me" (featuring YoungBoy Never Broke Again) | 2019 | 84 | 38 | — | — | — | — | — | RIAA: Platinum | A Love Letter to You 4 |
| "The Grinch" | 2019 | — | — | — | — | — | — | — | RIAA: Platinum; RMNZ: Gold | A Love Letter to You 4 |
| "Blastoff" (Internet Money featuring Juice Wrld and Trippie Redd) | 2020 | 79 | 26 | — | 63 | 5 | 90 | 155 | MC: Platinum; RMNZ: Gold | B4 the Storm |
| "All I Know" (Machine Gun Kelly featuring Trippie Redd) | 2020 | — (Note: "Rockstar Knights" did not enter the Billboard Hot 100, but peaked at number three on the Bubbling Under Hot 100 chart.) | — | 11 | — | — | — | 152 | | Tickets to My Downfall |
| "Weeeeee" | 2020 | 80 | 25 | — | — | 27 | — | 152 | RIAA: Gold | Pegasus |
| "Never Change" (featuring Future) | 2020 | — (Note: "Never Change" did not enter the Billboard Hot 100, but peaked at number five on the Bubbling Under Hot 100 chart.) | 41 | — | — | 36 | — | — | | Pegasus |
| "Rockstar Knights" (with Kid Cudi) | 2020 | — (Note: "Rockstar Knights" did not enter the Billboard Hot 100, but peaked at number two on the Bubbling Under Hot 100 chart.) | 35 | — | 97 | — | — | 185 | | Man on the Moon III: The Chosen |
| "Pill Breaker" (with Travis Barker featuring Machine Gun Kelly and Blackbear) | 2021 | — | — | 13 | — | 24 | — | — | | Neon Shark vs Pegasus |
| "Without You" (with Travis Barker) | 2021 | — | — | 29 | — | — | — | — | | Neon Shark vs Pegasus |
| "Geronimo" (with Travis Barker featuring Chino Moreno) | 2021 | — | — | 39 | — | — | — | — | | Neon Shark vs Pegasus |
| "Red Sky" (with Travis Barker featuring Machine Gun Kelly) | 2021 | — | — | 32 | — | — | — | — | | Neon Shark vs Pegasus |
| "Dead Desert" (with Travis Barker featuring Scarlxrd and ZillaKami) | 2021 | — | — | — (Note: "Dead Desert" did not enter the Hot Rock & Alternative Songs chart, but peaked at number 12 on the Hot Hard Rock Songs chart.) | — | — | — | — | | Neon Shark vs Pegasus |
| "Shots in the Dark" (with Iann Dior) | 2021 | — | — | — | 81 | 8 | — | — | | Still Here |
| "Molly Hearts" | 2021 | — (Note: "Molly Hearts" did not enter the Billboard Hot 100, but peaked at number three on the Bubbling Under Hot 100 chart.) | 44 | — | — | — | — | — | | Trip at Knight |
| "MP5" (with SoFaygo) | 2021 | 86 | 31 | — | — | 19 | — | 155 | | Trip at Knight |
| "Betrayal" (featuring Drake) | 2021 | 67 | 23 | — | 45 | 17 | — | 90 | | Trip at Knight |
| "Finish Line" | 2021 | — (Note: "Finish Line" did not enter the Billboard Hot 100, but peaked at number nine on the Bubbling Under Hot 100 chart.) | — | — | — | — | — | — | | Trip at Knight |
| "Super Cell" | 2021 | — (Note: "Super Cell" did not enter the Billboard Hot 100, but peaked at number one on the Bubbling Under Hot 100 chart.) | 39 | — | — | — | — | — | | Trip at Knight |
| "Supernatural" | 2021 | — (Note: "Supernatural" did not enter the Billboard Hot 100, but peaked at number 19 on the Bubbling Under Hot 100 chart.) | — | — | — | — | — | — | | Trip at Knight |
| "Demon Time" (with Ski Mask the Slump God) | 2021 | 94 | 36 | — | — | — | — | — | | Trip at Knight |
| "Matt Hardy 999" (with Juice Wrld) | 2021 | 49 | 14 | — | 54 | 12 | 82 | 60 | RIAA: Gold | Trip at Knight |
| "Danny Phantom" (featuring XXXTentacion) | 2021 | 92 | 34 | — | — | — | — | 195 | | Trip at Knight |
| "Rich MF" (with Polo G featuring Lil Durk) | 2021 | 56 | 17 | — | 57 | 14 | — | 67 | RIAA: Gold | Trip at Knight |
| "Feline" (with Juice Wrld and Polo G) | 2021 | 56 | 13 | — | 54 | 4 | — | 65 | | Fighting Demons |
| "Save Me, Please" | 2022 | — | — | — | — | 23 | — | — | | First Draft |
| "1st Degree Murder" | 2022 | — | — | — | — | 26 | — | — | | First Draft |
| "Mansion Musik" | 2023 | — (Note: "Mansion Musik" did not enter the Billboard Hot 100, but peaked at number 21 on the Bubbling Under Hot 100 chart.) | 46 | — | — | 32 | — | — | | Mansion Musik |
| "Fully Loaded" (with Future and Lil Baby) | 2023 | 86 | 33 | — | — | 22 | — | — | | Mansion Musik |
| "Knight Crawler" (with Juice Wrld) | 2023 | 52 | 19 | — | 61 | 8 | — | 108 | | Mansion Musik |
| "Dark Brotherhood" (with Lil Baby) | 2023 | — (Note: "Dark Brotherhood" did not enter the Billboard Hot 100, but peaked at number five on the Bubbling Under Hot 100 chart.) | 46 | — | — | 32 | — | — | | Mansion Musik |
| "Take Me Away" (with Corbin) | 2023 | — | — | — | — | 40 | — | — | | A Love Letter to You 5 |
| "Closed Doors" (with Roddy Ricch) | 2023 | — | — | — | — | 22 | — | — | | A Love Letter to You 5 |
| "Wind" (with the Kid Laroi) | 2023 | — | — | — | — | 25 | — | — | | A Love Letter to You 5 |
| "Say What" (with PartyNextDoor) | 2026 | — (Note: "Say What" did not enter the Billboard Hot 100, but peaked at number 10 on the Bubbling Under Hot 100 chart.) | 27 | — | — | — | — | — | | NDA |
"—" denotes a recording that did not chart or was not released in that territory.

== Guest appearances ==
List of non-single guest appearances, with other performing artists, showing year released and album name
| Title | Year | Other performer(s) | Album |
|---|---|---|---|
| "Yoppa" | 2017 | Chris Brown | Heartbreak on a Full Moon |
| "Capeesh" | 2018 | Maxo Kream | Punken |
| "66" | 2018 | Lil Yachty | Lil Boat 2 |
| "Early Morning Trappin" | 2018 | Rich the Kid | The World Is Yours |
| "Ghostbusters" | 2018 | XXXTentacion, Ski Mask the Slump God, Quavo | Non-album single |
| "Murda" | 2018 | YoungBoy Never Broke Again | Decided |
| "Forever World" | 2018 | Lil Yachty | Nuthin' 2 Prove |
| "RIP" | 2018 | Joji | Ballads 1 |
| "Red Hot" | 2018 | Lil Keed | Keed Talk to 'Em |
| "Big Dawgs" | 2019 | Coi Leray | EC2 |
| "Red Butterflies" | 2019 | Quavo | Non-album single |
| "Icky Vicky" | 2019 | Rich the Kid | Non-album single |
| "Never Scared" | 2019 | Lil Mosey | Certified Hitmaker |
| "Che Cazzo Ridi" | 2019 | Fedez | Paranoia Airlines |
| "Candy" | 2019 | Machine Gun Kelly | Hotel Diablo |
| "All for Me" | 2019 | Smokepurpp | A Love Letter to You 4 and Deadstar 2 |
| "Blastoff" | 2020 | Internet Money, Juice Wrld | B4 the Storm |
| "Set" | 2020 | Berner, Jmo Let Em Know | Russ Bufalino: The Quiet Don |
| "Solar System" | 2020 | Famous Dex | Diana |
| "Loser" | 2020 | Rico Nasty | Nightmare Vacation |
| "Rockstar Knights" | 2020 | Kid Cudi | Man on the Moon III: The Chosen |
| "All I Know" | 2020 | Machine Gun Kelly | Tickets to My Downfall |
| "Ice Water" | 2021 | Lil Skies | Unbothered (Deluxe) |
| "Hit Em Hard" | 2021 | Offset, Lil Durk, Kevin Gates, King Von | F9 |
| "Choppa Shoot the Loudest" | 2021 | Lil Tecca, Chief Keef | We Love You Tecca 2 |
| "IDC" | 2021 | D. Savage | BPL |
| "Head$hot!" | 2021 | KA$HDAMI | HYPERNOVA. |
| "Story of My Life" | 2021 | Illenium, Sueco | Non-album single |
| "Feline" | 2021 | Juice Wrld, Polo G | Fighting Demons |
| "Alone" | 2022 | $NOT | Ethereal |
| "Lifted" | 2022 | Robb Bank$ | Falconia |
| "Push Up" | 2022 | Ne-Yo | Self Explanatory |
| "All Night" | 2022 | S-X | Things Change |
| "Who You Are" | 2022 | Doodie Lo | Loyal Bros 2 |
| "No Love" | 2022 | K Suave | Hit Me When You Land |
| "Iluminado" | 2023 | Orochi | Vida Cara |
| "City of God" | 2023 | Orochi | Vida Cara |
| "I Love You Hoe" | 2023 | Odetari, 9lives | Non-album single |
