= Neon Shark vs Pegasus =

Studio album (reissue) (Note: Released as part of the deluxe reissue of Trippie Redd's third studio album Pegasus) by Trippie Redd
- Released: February 19, 2021
- Genre: Rock; pop punk; rap rock
- Length: 113:42
- Label: TenThousand Projects; Caroline; 1400 Entertainment
- Producer: OZ; Nik D; Oscar Zulu; LVNDVN; Hammad Beats; Quintin Gulledge; Frano; Burnley AKL; Stoopid Lou; Deats; Goose the Guru; LASTNGHT; Dinuzzo; Loaded; ChaseTheMoney; Heavy Mellow; Starboy; RIP; Psymun; Distance Decay; ATL Jacob; J.U.S.T.I.C.E. League; Mally Mall; 1993; Eesean Bolden; Lateef Garrett; ChopSquad DJ; RMG Nu; FaatKiid; Xeryus; Wheezy; Rance; Khyrie Taylor; Sean Momberger; LNK; Mario Petersen; Nick Mira; Outtatown; CBMix; Cardiak; Scott Storch; Avedon; Angel Lopez; Travis Barker; Yeezo; Nick Long; John Feldmann; Federico Vindver; Pearl Lion; Trippie Redd

Trippie Redd chronology
Pegasus (2020)	Neon Shark vs Pegasus (2021)	Trip at Knight (2021)

Singles from Neon Shark vs Pegasus
- 1. "Dreamer" Released: June 18, 2020

Neon Shark vs Pegasus, also stylized as NEON SHARK vs Pegasus (Deluxe: Presented by Travis Barker), is a reissued album by American rapper and singer Trippie Redd in collaboration with fellow American musician Travis Barker. It was released on February 19, 2021, as the deluxe edition of Redd's third studio album, Pegasus. The album features guest appearances from Machine Gun Kelly, Blackbear, Chino Moreno, Scarlxrd, and ZillaKami. The original version of the album – which is included – was released on October 30, 2020, and retains features from Myiah Lynnae, Yung LB, PartyNextDoor, Chris Brown, Rich the Kid, Young Thug, Future, Lil Mosey, Quavo, Busta Rhymes, Sean Kingston, Doe Boy, Lil Wayne, HoodyBaby, and Swae Lee.

Neon Shark vs Pegasus sees Trippie Redd explore rock music. One critic wrote that "[p]roduced by Blink-182 drummer Travis Barker, it establishes a totally new distorted rock sound, louder and crunchier than Redd's previous genre collages." The album was supported by one single: "Dreamer", released on June 18, 2020. The record project received critical acclaim, with praise directed especially to its successful experimentation. Many critics stated that the album was a rewarding foray into rap rock, where others such as Lil Wayne (Rebirth) had failed.

== Background ==
Trippie Redd released the album's lead and only single, "Dreamer", on his 21st birthday, June 18, 2020. Including this song, the album features fourteen new songs. However, before the deluxe version was released, it leaked in its entirety on Tidal on January 29, 2021. It was then taken down swiftly. The album was officially announced by Redd on February 18, 2021, and was released the following day. It serves as the artist's first rock project, while also marking his first project that does not contain hip hop and rap in it. Travis Barker said: "I don't think there's a whole lot of rappers that can make an actual rock album… I think they can make rock-inspired songs, but Trippie is so good with melody and can sing so well. It was really easy for him to do this."

== Release and promotion ==
Trippie Redd had stated that the deluxe edition of Pegasus would be a full rock album and would be titled Neon Shark. Travis Barker said: "It's a real rock album. It's not just guitar over trap beats, we went all the way in".

When asked about the meaning behind the title Neon Shark, Redd stated: "I feel like as a person I'm outgoing so, colorful. And then people look at me like I'm a shark, maybe scared, so they keep their distance." He chose an animal to symbolise the album in the model of Deftones' White Pony (2000). Barker added: "From the first day, … He was sending me little gifs of sharks and stuff." Redd chose to formulate the title as Neon Shark vs Pegasus to encourage listeners to think about whether Pegasus or the Neon Shark deluxe was better.

== Critical reception ==
Professional ratings
Review scores
Source	Rating
The Daily Reveille	5/5 stars
HotNewHipHop	'VERY HOTTTTT'

Emma Jackimowicz of The Daily Reveille praised Trippie Redd's experimentation, calling the project "a refreshing, emo-punk album". She highlighted "Without You", "Geronimo" and "Frozen Ocean" as some of the best songs on the album. Lucas Fagen of Hyperallergic praised the project as a "pop-punk gem". Maisy Sullivan of The Tower was also complementary towards the album, writing: "Neon Shark is very experimental. Trippie Redd uses rock as the sort of umbrella genre, yet tries out different branches of the artistic category. He features screamo, pop-punk, trap, and traditional alternative styles to combine into the entirety of the work." She concluded: "His discography is messy, his aesthetic is chaotic, and his music tests all styles. Trippie Redd is controversial; however, he does not look to impress. He looks to be himself unapologetically. Neon Shark is a pure reflection of his happy-go-lucky personality. It fits into his emo-style rap genre, and it is easy to discern that he put work into its production." The song "Geronimo" was included on Loudwire's list of the Best Rock Songs of 2021 (So Far) in October 2021.

=== Year-end lists ===
Select year-end rankings for Trip at Knight
Publication	List	Rank	Ref.
The Daily Reveille	The Best Albums of 2021 (so far)	2	

== Track listing ==
Credits adapted from Tidal for both editions.

Pegasus: Neon Shark vs Pegasus Presented By Travis Barker (Deluxe)
No.	Title	Writer(s)	Producer(s)	Length
1.	"Pill Breaker" (with Travis Barker featuring Machine Gun Kelly and Blackbear)	Michael White IV; Travis Barker; Colson Baker; Matthew Musto; Andrew Goldstein; Matt Malpass	Barker	2:57
2.	"Without You" (with Travis Barker)	White; Barker; Nick Long	Barker; Long	3:09
3.	"Swimming" (with Travis Barker)	White; Barker; Will Swan	Barker	2:15
4.	"Female Shark" (with Travis Barker)	White; Barker	Barker	2:43
5.	"Geronimo" (with Travis Barker featuring Chino Moreno)	White; Barker; Camilo Moreno; Long	Barker; Long	2:59
6.	"Sea World" (with Travis Barker)	White; Barker; Malpass	Barker	2:36
7.	"Red Sky" (with Travis Barker featuring Machine Gun Kelly)	White; Barker; Baker; John Feldmann	Barker; Feldmann	2:32
8.	"Megladon" (with Travis Barker)	White; Barker; Malpass	Barker	3:14
9.	"Save Yourself" (with Travis Barker)	White; Barker; Feldmann	Barker; Feldmann	2:40
10.	"Dreamer"	White; Francis Palladino	Yeezo	2:50
11.	"It's Coming" (with Travis Barker)	White; Barker; Malpass	Barker	2:34
12.	"Leaders" (with Travis Barker)	White; Barker; Federico Vindver; Jared Scharff; Jose Velazquez	Barker; Federico Vindver; Pearl Lion; Angel Lopez	2:40
13.	"Frozen Ocean" (with Travis Barker)	White; Barker; Malpass	Barker	3:24
14.	"Dead Desert" (with Travis Barker featuring Scarlxrd and ZillaKami)	White; Barker; Marius Listhrop; Junius Rogers; Malpass	Barker	2:41

Pegasus – Standard edition
No.	Title	Writer(s)	Producer(s)	Length
15.	"Let It Out" (featuring Myiah Lynnae)	White; Myiah Lynnae; Ozan Yildrim; Oliver Carnival; Nicholas Frascona	OZ; Nik D^{[a]}; Oscar Zulu^{[a]}; LVNDVN^{[a]}	2:56
16.	"Moonlight"	White; Adrian Rupke; Quintin Gulledge; Joe Talamo	Hammad Beats; Quintin Gulledge; Oscar Zulu^{[a]}	2:41
17.	"Love Scars 4"	White; Rupke; Talamo	Hammad Beats; Oscar Zulu^{[a]}	2:36
18.	"The Nether"	White; Yildrim; Frano Huett; Jordan Lusitini	OZ; Frano; Burnley AKL^{[a]}	2:37
19.	"So Stressed" (featuring Yung LB)	White; Fetaiaki Teaupa; Rupke	Hammad Beats; Stoopid Lou^{[a]}; Oscar Zulu^{[a]}	3:24
20.	"Excitement" (with PartyNextDoor)	White; Jahron Brathwaite; Yildrim; Nik Frascona; Dominik Patrzek	OZ; Nik D; Deats	4:43
21.	"Mood" (featuring Chris Brown)	White; Christopher Brown; Nickalas Turner; Kyle Edwards; Darien Overton	Goose the Guru; LASTNGHT; Dinuzzo	2:23
22.	"Pegasus"	White; Rupke	Hammad Beats; Oscar Zulu^{[a]}	2:17
23.	"Weeeeee"	White; Kamil Budek	Loaded	2:32
24.	"Personal Favorite" (featuring Rich the Kid)	White; Dimitri Roger; Chase Rose; Everett Romano	ChaseTheMoney; Heavy Mellow	2:35
25.	"V-12"	White; Anton Mendo	Starboy; RIP; Psymun; Distance Decay	2:06
26.	"Spaceships" (featuring Young Thug)	White; Jeffery Williams; Jacob Canady	ATL Jacob	2:54
27.	"Never Change" (featuring Future)	White; Nayvadius Wilburn; Jamal Rashid; Larrance Dopson; Khirye Tyler	Mally Mall; J.U.S.T.I.C.E. League; Dinuzzo; 1993; Eesean Bolden; LASTNGHT; Lateef Garrett; Rance1500; Khirye Tyler	2:53
28.	"Good Morning"	White; Darrell Jackson	ChopSquad DJ	3:21
29.	"No Honorable Mentions" (with Lil Mosey featuring Quavo)	White; Lathan Echols; Quavious Marshall; Jackson	ChopSquad DJ; RMG Nu^{[a]}; FaatKiid^{[a]}; Xeryus^{[a]}	4:18
30.	"I Got You" (with Busta Rhymes)	White; Trevor Smith, Jr.; Wesley Glass; Roger McNair; Rashia Fisher; William Lewis; Leroy Jones	Wheezy; Rance^{[a]}; Khyrie Taylor^{[a]}	3:05
31.	"Too Fly"	White; Rupke	Hammad Beats; LNK^{[a]}; Mario Petersen^{[a]}	3:04
32.	"Red Beam" (featuring Sean Kingston)	White; Kisean Anderson; Yildrim	OZ; Deats^{[a]}; Nik D^{[a]}	2:07
33.	"Oomps Revenge, Pt. 2"	White; Rupke	Hammad Beats; Oscar Zulu^{[a]}	1:57
34.	"Take One"	White; Nicholas Mira	Nick Mira	2:01
35.	"Sleepy Hollow"	White; Tobias Dekker	Outtatown	1:41
36.	"Kid That Didd" (featuring Future and Doe Boy)	White; Wilburn; Isam Mostafa; Jackson; Christopher Barnett	ChopSquad DJ; CBMix	3:37
37.	"Don"	White; Jackson	ChopSquad DJ	2:24
38.	"Hell Rain" (featuring Lil Wayne and Hoodybaby)	White	Cardiak	3:47
39.	"TR666" (featuring Swae Lee)	White; Khalif Brown; Scott Storch	Scott Storch; Avedon	3:00
40.	"Sun God (Above You)" (featuring Myiah Lynnae)	White; Lynnae; Jose Velazquez	Angel Lopez	3:12
Total length:				74:11

Notes

- ^{^[a]} signifies an uncredited additional producer
- "TR666" was initially released on December 26, 2017.
- All songs on the deluxe stylized in all caps.

Sample credits

- "TR666" contains samples of "A Garden of Peace" by Lonnie Liston Smith.
- "Female Shark" contains samples of "True Love" by nothing,nowhere. and Travis Barker.
- "I Got You" interpolates "I Know What You Want", performed by Busta Rhymes and Mariah Carey.
