= Forever Ever =

Forever Ever may refer to:

- "Forever Ever", a song by Trippie Redd from the 2018 album Life's a Trip
- "Forever Ever", a song by Miami Horror from the 2015 album All Possible Futures
