= Wish (Diplo song) =

2018 single by Diplo featuring Trippie Redd

Single by Diplo featuring Trippie Redd

from the album California and Life's a Trip
- Released: March 23, 2018
- Recorded: 2017
- Genre: Emo rap; Psychedelic rap
- Length: 2:55
- Label: Mad Decent
- Songwriters: Michael White; Thomas Pentz; Boaz de Jong; Wyatt Sanders; Robin P. Francesco
- Producers: Diplo; Boaz van de Beatz; Sanders; Yoda Francesco (co.)

Diplo singles chronology
"Suicidal" (2018)	"Wish" (2018)	"Miss You (Major Lazer & Alvaro Remix)" (2018)

Trippie Redd singles chronology
"Bool" (2018)	"Wish" (2018)	"Man Down" (2018)

Music video
- "Wish" on YouTube

"Wish" is a song by American DJ Diplo featuring American rapper Trippie Redd. It was released on March 23, 2018, as a single from Diplo's EP California (2018) and Redd's debut studio album Life's a Trip (2018). After going viral on the video-sharing app TikTok in 2025, the song entered the Billboard Hot 100 for the first time, debuting at number 88.

== Composition ==
Trevor Smith of HotNewHipHop described the style of the song as almost "bright and fast enough" to be pop radio-friendly, even though it has a dark subject matter. The song also features a "dreamy melody" from Diplo.

== Music video ==
The official music video was released on April 25, 2018. It opens with Diplo and Trippie Redd posing on the balcony of a lavish mansion, before Redd goes inside and plays with a group of baby goats. He wanders inside the mansion, as he experiences psychedelic effects. Eventually, Redd swings from a chandelier surrounded by fireworks, as an escape from the goats.

An alternate music video was released in February 2020. This visual takes place in a warehouse and starts off with Trippie Redd seemingly killing clones of himself, through the use of visual effects, until a stand-in actor kills him by mistake. The video crew panics and attempts to call an ambulance, but the director suggests to "keep rolling", instead wrapping Redd's body with a trash bag and throwing it over a bridge.

== Charts ==
Chart (2018)	Peak position
New Zealand Heatseekers (RMNZ)	8
US Bubbling Under Hot 100 (Billboard)	4
US Bubbling Under R&B/Hip-Hop Singles (Billboard)	2

Chart (2025)	Peak position
Canada Hot 100 (Billboard)	90
US Billboard Hot 100	79
US Hot R&B/Hip-Hop Songs (Billboard)	17

== Certifications ==
Region	Certification	Certified units/sales
New Zealand (RMNZ)	2× Platinum	60,000^{‡}
United Kingdom (BPI)	Gold	400,000^{‡}
United States (RIAA)	2× Platinum	2,000,000^{‡}
^{‡} Sales+streaming figures based on certification alone.
