= How You Feel (song) =

Single by Trippie Redd

from the album Life's a Trip
- Released: June 21, 2018
- Genre: Alternative rock; emo
- Length: 4:34
- Label: TenThousand Projects
- Composers: Michael Lamar White IV; Austin Schindler; Andrew Franklin; Raynford Humphrey; James Lyon; Eddie Money

"How You Feel" is a song by American rapper Trippie Redd. It was released as a single from his debut studio album, Life's a Trip.

== Background ==
"How You Feel" is a guitar-driven track that showcases Trippie Redd's interest in rock music as well as his utilization of clean singing, rather than his usual vocal style of rapping.

The single contains an interpolation of the guitar in Eddie Money's "Baby Hold On".
