= NDA (album) =

Studio album by Trippie Redd
- Released: August 14, 2026
- Genres: Hip-hop; trap; pop rap; rage; emo rap; alternative R&B
- Length: 68:07
- Labels: 10K Projects; 1400 Entertainment
- Producers: ATL Jacob; Clams Casino; Hitmaka; Imogen Heap; +NRGY; 5EBAS; 5kjordn; 808sintez; Batmanonthebeatz; Bosley; Carson Hackney; Daydream Made It; Dr. Zeuz; elijahgeeked; Gfelds; HighRoller; Homixide J Bone; Igor Mamet; Jonnywood; Kobi; Luc1us; madd maks; Marchello Bates; Mike Wavvs; m1leyboyonix; MM; Money Musik; MTD; Noa Nalu; OTM; Prep Bijan; prodbyiwmm; Red YoungBoy; Rosen Beatz; rprpxrprp; Simo Fre; skreer; southboy; Tal Tamari; Theevoni; thr6x; Tom Gemma; trisstt; Tristan Robertson; UK24; VenoTheBuilder; Who Is Alvi?; Wolf

Trippie Redd chronology
Genre: Sadboy (2024)	NDA (2026)	#NDA (2026)

Singles from NDA
- 1. "Paperbag Boy" Released: April 1, 2026; 2. "Swagger" Released: July 31, 2026; 3. "Meet the Redds" Released: August 11, 2026

NDA is the sixth studio album by American rapper and singer Trippie Redd, succeeding Mansion Musik (2023). It was released through 10K Projects and 1400 Entertainment on August 14, 2026. Guest appearances include Young Thug, Sexyy Red, Rema, YNW Melly, PartyNextDoor, BigXthaPlug, Tory Lanez, Nine Vicious, Lil Wayne, Rob49, Ski Mask the Slump God, Quavo, NoCap, and Kodak Black.

The first release in a two-album project, its successor, #NDA, released on 28 August 2026, exactly two weeks after the first album.

== Background and promotion ==
A sequel to Life's a Trip (2018) was originally teased in December 2023. Trippie wrote on Instagram: "Life's a Trip 2 ... Every last song will be recorded on a yacht[.] [sic] Taking trips for this ! gotta see the world and work". In late 2024, Trippie shifted the sonic direction of the album, revealing the title Live Love Laugh Die on September 22. After several songs for the album were leaked, Redd took to Twitter to write: "If i don’t get another song with Bieber, y'all fault wtf ... Leaking old songs too…….. get a life." On December 30, Trippie Redd released the track "H@e", produced by Bosley. One critic described the song as "one of his most explosive tracks in a while", whilst XXL included it in a list of the best hip-hop songs released that week.

On January 13, 2025, Redd released the track "Outta Here"; Zachary Horvath of HotNewHipHop called it "equally braggadocious" as "H@E". On January 20, Redd released the song "Strike Out". On January 27, Redd released the song "Scream" in response to allegations that he had cheated on his partner Coi Leray. Contemporaneously, Redd changed the name of the album to Judge Me Now, and then simply NDA. On June 6, Redd released "Outta Here" onto streaming platforms in collaboration with French Montana. On July 9, Redd and Kanye West hinted that West would be on the album, despite a recent dispute between them concerning the foundation of rage. On July 18, Redd released the two-song EP Woke Up / The Face and an accompanying music video, with the latter song featuring vocals by DJ Drama. Horvath (HotNewHipHop) said that the EP was "a bit of a return to form for Trippie Redd and it shows just how ready he is to get back in the game."

On September 5, Redd released the single "World Boss", whose instrumental flips Ashanti's "Rock wit U (Awww Baby)" into a "cinematic trap" song. On October 2, Redd released the song "Sketchy"; "Checklist" followed on October 7. Redd then released "Stay The Same" on October 14; Alexander Cole of HotNewHipHop noted Redd's "melodic" character, and added that "we get atmospheric yet oddly uplifting instrumentation." On November 28, he released "Can't Count Me Out", produced by ATL Jacob. On April 1, 2026, after re-establishing relations with Young Thug, Redd released a collaboration with him entitled "Paperbag Boy". Cole (HotNewHipHop) wrote: "Trippie gives us some melodies here, while also offering up a catchy hook that is hard to deny." On July 29, Redd announced that he would release NDA on August 14. Lenox Washington of The Source wrote that the "announcement came with a surreal official trailer inspired by the eerie "Backrooms" aesthetic, featuring empty, dreamlike interiors, moody car sequences, and mirror shots that create a cinematic atmosphere without giving much away." On July 31, just two days after, Redd would release "Swagger" (stylized in all caps), which would serve as the second promotional single for the project. On August 11, 2026, he released the third and final promotional single titled "Meet The Redds" with Sexyy Red. On August 12, Redd would go on to reveal the official track list for the album, comprising 25 tracks and 14 features.

== Commercial performance ==
The album sold 16,000 album-equivalent units in its first week and debuted at number 50, marking his lowest-charting album since A Love Letter to You 2 in 2017.

== Track listing ==
NDA track listing
No.	Title	Writer(s)	Producer(s)	Length
1.	"Merch It"	Michael Lamar White II; Jason Rosenberg; Igor Mamet	Rosen Beatz	2:05
2.	"Yopstar"	White II; Rosenberg; Daniel Soto; Mamet	Rosen Beatz; Wolf	2:22
3.	"Paperbag Boy" (with Young Thug)	White II; Jeffery Lamar Williams II	Homixide JBone; rprpxrprp; southboy; trisstt	3:11
4.	"V-12"	White II; Markos Muñiz; Matt Bosley; Mamet	madd maks; skreer; Bosley; prodbyiwmm	2:21
5.	"Chanely"	White II; Mamet; Joel Hailey; Randy Waldman; Roy C. Bennett	Igor Mamet	2:27
6.	"Swagger"	White II	+NRGY; Homixide JBone; southboy; trisstt	2:34
7.	"Pourin 4s"	White II; Jordan Church; Devin Morrison; Tyler-Justin A. Sharpe; Mamet	5kjordn; MTD; thr6x	2:33
8.	"Uncle Phil" (with Young Thug)	White II; Williams II; Lucius Lowe; Mohkom Singh Bhangal; Mamet	Luc1us; Money Musik	3:22
9.	"For Her" (with Rema)	White II; Divine Joshua Ikubor; Mamet; Benjamin Franklin Peay	Igor Mamet	2:10
10.	"Free Melly" (with YNW Melly)	White II; Jamell Maurice Demons; Joshua Junhee Park; Mamet; Tom Gemma	Daydream Made It; Igor Mamet; Tom Gemma	3:50
11.	"Say What" (with PartyNextDoor)	White II; Jahron Anthony Brathwaite; Sebas Lopez; Terrel Dawes; Michael Frederick Fialkow; David Hughes; Alvi Garcia; Mamet; Marchello Bates	5ebas; Batmanonthebeatz; MM; Prep Bijan; Who Is Alvi?	4:16
12.	"Good Chance" (with BigXthaPlug)	White II; Xavier Landum; Mamet; Michael Washington, Jr.; Evans J. Clark; Hermon Weems; James Jay Barnes; Charlton Kenneth Jeffrey Howard	Igor Mamet; Mike Wavvs	2:04
13.	"Can't Believe It"	White II; Simone Di Franco; Sharpe; Skye Morales	Red YoungBoy; Simo Fre; thr6x	2:13
14.	"How Much X" (with Tory Lanez)	White II; Daystar Shemuel Shua Peterson; Bates; Tal Tamari; Lee Yoon-gu; Mamet	Marchello Bates; Tal Tamari; Theevoni	3:36
15.	"Meet the Redds" (with Sexyy Red)	White II; Janae Nierah Wherry; Jacob Denzal Canady; Elijah Borders; Evan Kobe Hoods; Mamet	ATL Jacob; elijahgeeked; Kobi	2:10
16.	"Kidding Me" (with Nine Vicious)	White II; Trevon Deronta O'Ryan Echols; Bosley; Muñiz; Bryson Tiller; Mamet	808sintez; HighRoller; Bosley; madd maks	2:19
17.	"I Got Everything"	White II; Canady; Mamet	ATL Jacob	3:29
18.	"Fine Shit" (with Lil Wayne)	White II; Dwayne Michael Carter Jr.; Mamet; Sil van Bebber; Phalon Anton Alexander; Mary Jane Blige; Terius Gesteelde-Diamant; Christopher Alan Stewart	Igor Mamet; UK24	2:04
19.	"No Way"	White II; Bosley; Grant Feldman; Muñiz; Mamet	Bosley; Gfelds; madd maks; prodbyiwmm	1:55
20.	"MTV" (with Rob49)	White II; Robert Coleman Thomas; Noa Nalu Shelfow	Noa Nalu	2:49
21.	"Break It In" (with Ski Mask the Slump God)	White II; Stokeley Clevon Goulbourne; Rocco Did It Again!	Rocco Did It Again!	3:23
22.	"Slime Too"	White II; Morrison; Michael Thomas Volpe; Imogen Jennifer Jane Heap	MTD; Clams Casino; Igor Mamet; Imogen Heap	1:41
23.	"Pink Toes" (with Quavo)	White II; Quavious Keyate Marshall; Carson Hackney; Christian Ward; Bates; Jonathan Johannes Birkner	Carson Hackney; Hitmaka; Marchello Bates; Jonnywood	3:28
24.	"Switches & Fentanyl" (with NoCap)	White II; Kobe Vidal Crawford Jr.; Tavian Carter	VenoTheBuilder	3:01
25.	"I'm Sorry Baby" (with Kodak Black)	White II; Bill Kahan Kapri; Jesus Bobe; Tristan Robertson	Dr. Zeuz; OTM; Tristan Robertson	2:44
Total length:				68:07

== Charts ==
Chart performance for NDA
Chart (2026)	Peak position
US Billboard 200	50
US Top R&B/Hip-Hop Albums (Billboard)	12
