= Avedon (music producer) =

Dutch record producer

- Born: Vincent van den Ende; 1992 (age 33–34); Amsterdam, Netherlands
- Genres: Hip-hop; R&B
- Occupation: Record producer
- Label: Warner Music Benelux

Vincent van den Ende (Dutch pronunciation: [ˈvɪnsɛnt fɑn dən ˈɛndə, - də ˈʔɛndə]; born 1992), known professionally as Avedon, is a Dutch record producer. He is best known for his work with American hip hop and R&B musicians such as Chris Brown, Megan Thee Stallion, Trippie Redd, Chloe x Halle, 6ix9ine, Roddy Ricch, Russ, Shy Glizzy and Thutmose. He is also closely associated with American record producer Scott Storch whom he shares a studio with and works with.

== Biography ==
Vincent van den Ende was born in Amsterdam to theatrical producer Joop van den Ende and is currently based in Los Angeles. In 2020, he signed a record deal with Warner Music Benelux.

== Selected production discography ==
Credits taken from Tidal.

| Year | Artist | Song | Album | Produced with |
|---|---|---|---|---|
| 2017 | Bone Thugs | "Coming Home" | New Waves | Clifford Golio, Damizza |
| 2017 | Bone Thugs | "If Heaven Had a Cellphone" | New Waves | Damizza |
| 2017 | Bone Thugs | "Good Person" | New Waves | Sole producer |
| 2017 | Bone Thugs | "Fantasy" | New Waves | Sole producer |
| 2017 | Bone Thugs | "That Girl" | New Waves | Sole producer |
| 2017 | Bone Thugs | "Let It All Out" | New Waves | Sole producer |
| 2017 | Bone Thugs | "Waves" | New Waves | Scott Storch |
| 2017 | Bone Thugs | "Cocaine Love" | New Waves | Sole producer |
| 2017 | Bone Thugs | "Bad Dream" | New Waves | Sole producer |
| 2017 | Bone Thugs | "Gravity" | New Waves | Far East Movement |
| 2017 | Bone Thugs | "Bottle Service" | New Waves | Damizza |
| 2017 | Bone Thugs | "Change The Story" | New Waves | Sole producer |
| 2017 | Bone Thugs | "Ruthless" | New Waves | Sole producer |
| 2018 | 6ix9ine | "Kika" | Dummy Boy | Scott Storch |
| 2018 | 6ix9ine | "Waka" | Dummy Boy | Scott Storch |
| 2018 | 6ix9ine | "Wondo" | Dummy Boy | Scott Storch |
| 2018 | Trippie Redd | "Taking a Walk" | Life's a Trip | Scott Storch |
| 2018 | Roddy Ricch | "Down Below" | Feed Tha Streets II | Scott Storch |
| 2018 | Roddy Ricch | "Day One (Outro)" | Feed Tha Streets II | Sole producer |
| 2018 | Thutmose | "Memories" | Spider-Man: Into the Spider-Verse | Sole producer |
| 2018 | Russ | "The Flute Song" | Zoo | Scott Storch, Russell Vitale |
| 2019 | Chris Brown | "Undecided" | Indigo | Scott Storch |
| 2019 | Chris Brown | "Early Y2K" | Indigo | Scott Storch |
| 2020 | Russ | "3am" | Shake the Snow Globe (Deluxe) | Scott Storch |
| 2020 | Tee Grizzley | "Rap a Lot" | The Smartest | VYNK |
| 2020 | Tee Grizzley | "No Witness" | The Smartest | VYNK |
| 2020 | Tee Grizzley | "Winning" | The Smartest | VYNK |
| 2020 | Tee Grizzley | "Covid" | The Smartest | Sole producer |
| 2020 | Shy Glizzy | "Shooting Star" | Young Jefe 3 | Sole producer |
| 2020 | Shy Glizzy | "Too Hood 4 Hollywood" | Young Jefe 3 | Sole producer |
| 2020 | Chloe x Halle | "Do It" | Ungodly Hour | Scott Storch, Asoteric |
| 2020 | Chloe x Halle | "Lonely" | Ungodly Hour | Scott Storch, Chloe Bailey, Halle Bailey, Wallis Lane, Ferraro |
| 2020 | Rico Nasty | "Own It" | Nightmare Vacation | Camden, Alter Ego |
| 2020 | Megan Thee Stallion | "What's New" | Good News | Cody Tarpley |
| 2020 | Megan Thee Stallion | "Don't Rock Me to Sleep" | Good News | VYNK |
| 2022 | Krewella | "Drive Away" | The Body Never Lies | Jahan Yousaf, Yasmine Yousaf, Sam Lassner |

== Awards and nominations ==
| Year | Award | Category | Work | Result | Ref. |
|---|---|---|---|---|---|
| 2020 | Grammy Awards | Best R&B Song | "Do It" | Nominated | |
| 2020 | Soul Train Music Awards | The Ashford & Simpson Songwriter's Award | "Do It" | Nominated | |
