= Gassed Up =

Single by Nebu Kiniza

Single by Nebu Kiniza
- Released: August 26, 2016
- Recorded: 2015
- Genre: Hip hop
- Length: 3:13
- Label: OSHS; RCA
- Songwriter(s): Cory Reid; Cameron Pitts
- Producer(s): MexikoDro

Nebu Kiniza singles chronology
| "Hop Out" (2016) | "Gassed Up" (2016) | "Fuck It Up" (2016) |

Music video
- "Gassed Up" on YouTube

"Gassed Up" is a single by American rapper Nebu Kiniza, first released on October 25, 2015. A sleeper hit, it gained recognition in 2016, becoming his breakout song. The song was produced by MexikoDro.

== Background ==
In an interview on the ProducerGrind podcast, Nebu Kiniza stated that he found the instrumental of the song on YouTube as a "Young Scooter (and possibly Future) type beat". He recorded the song in 15 minutes with only a microphone. The track received widespread attention in the summer of 2016, and released through streaming services on August 26, garnering over 20 million listens on SoundCloud, over seven million views on YouTube and over seven million plays on Spotify.

== Composition and lyrics ==
The song is about a high school party that Kiniza attended, featuring the lyrics "Gassed up shawty / Said I need 'bout 40 / Pull up to the party / Yeah yeah yeah". According to him, "It was a double analogy or however you want to take it. Either you're feeling yourself or big headed or you like smoking weed. It's kind of like how Lloyd said 'She's 5'2' or 'She's Fine Too.' It's either or. It's just music."

== Music video ==
The official music video premiered on September 26, 2016. It sees Nebu Kiniza cruising in the sunny streets of Los Angeles, on a vintage gas pump. Along the way, a group of kids follow him down the street. In another scene, he magically disappears and reappears through puffs of smoke.

== Charts ==
| Chart (2017) | Peak position |
|---|---|
| US Bubbling Under Hot 100 Singles (Billboard) | 3 |
| US Hot R&B/Hip-Hop Songs (Billboard) | 45 |

== Certifications ==
| Region | Certification | Certified units/sales |
|---|---|---|
| United States (RIAA) | 2× Platinum | 2,000,000^{‡} |
^{‡} Sales+streaming figures based on certification alone.
