= Taking a Walk =

2018 single by Trippie Redd

Single by Trippie Redd

from the album Life's a Trip
- Released: August 6, 2018
- Length: 2:01
- Label: TenThousand Projects
- Songwriters: Michael White; Scott Storch; Vincent van den Ende
- Producers: Avedon; Storch

Trippie Redd singles chronology
"Me Likey" (2018)	"Taking a Walk" (2018)	"Topanga" (2018)

"Taking a Walk" is a song by American rapper Trippie Redd, released as the third single from his debut studio album Life's a Trip on August 6, 2018. Produced by co-songwriters Scott Storch and Avedon, it is Redd's second highest-charting song to date.

== Background ==
Trippie Redd first teased the song in December 2017, but the snippet was removed and re-uploaded in early March 2018. On April 4, 2018, he posted a second snippet on his Instagram story, which showed him in a studio with rapper Nebu Kiniza. Although this raised speculation of a guest appearance in the song, the collaboration did not happen.

The song was released on August 6, 2018. That same day, Redd also revealed the tracklist for his album Life's A Trip, which was released four days later.

== Charts ==
Chart (2018)	Peak position
Canada (Canadian Hot 100)	49
New Zealand Hot Singles (RMNZ)	4
Portugal (AFP)	90
Sweden Heatseeker (Sverigetopplistan)	3
UK Singles (OCC)	80
US Billboard Hot 100	46
US Hot R&B/Hip-Hop Songs (Billboard)	22
US Hot Rap Songs (Billboard)	20

== Certifications ==
Region	Certification	Certified units/sales
Brazil (Pro-Música Brasil)	Gold	20,000^{‡}
Canada (Music Canada)	3× Platinum	240,000^{‡}
New Zealand (RMNZ)	Platinum	30,000^{‡}
Portugal (AFP)	Gold	5,000^{‡}
United Kingdom (BPI)	Silver	200,000^{‡}
United States (RIAA)	3× Platinum	3,000,000^{‡}
^{‡} Sales+streaming figures based on certification alone.
