= Life's a Trip =

Studio album by Trippie Redd
- Released: August 10, 2018
- Recorded: 2017–2018
- Genres: Emo rap; pop-punk
- Length: 46:39
- Labels: TenThousand Projects; Caroline
- Producers: Austin Powerz; Avedon; BeatPusher; Boaz van de Beatz; Diplo; G Koop; Honorable C.N.O.T.E.; Jacob Reske; Murda Beatz; Nik D; OZ; Preme; Pro Logic; Scott Storch; Wallis Lane; Wheezy; Wyatt Sanders; Yoda Francesco; We Are The Stars

Trippie Redd chronology
Angels & Demons (2017)	Life's a Trip (2018)	A Love Letter to You 3 (2018)

Singles from Life's a Trip
- 1. "Dark Knight Dummo" Released: December 6, 2017; 2. "Uka Uka" Released: February 20, 2018; 3. "Wish" Released: March 23, 2018; 4. "How You Feel" Released: June 21, 2018; 5. "Taking a Walk" Released: August 6, 2018

Life's a Trip (stylized in all capitals) is the debut studio album by American rapper Trippie Redd. It was released on August 10, 2018, by TenThousand Projects and Caroline Distribution. The album features guest appearances from Diplo, Young Thug, Reese Laflare, and Travis Scott. Production was handled by OZ, Murda Beatz, BeatPusher, Honorable C.N.O.T.E., Avedon, Diplo, Scott Storch, Wheezy, Boaz van de Beatz and We Are The Stars, among others.

Life's a Trip sees Trippie Redd explore emo rap; one critic wrote that the project had "a compelling outcome", and that "Trippie Redd is teaching us ... that emo rap is an aesthetic, not a conversation topic". The album was supported by five singles: "Dark Knight Dummo", "Uka Uka", "Wish", "How You Feel" and "Taking a Walk". In January 2019, Redd embarked upon his 'Life's a Trip' tour. The record project was a commercial success, debuting at number four on the US Billboard 200 chart. It was also well-received by critics and is regarded as a pioneering emo rap album. On June 20, 2019, Life's a Trip was certified Gold by the Recording Industry Association of America (RIAA). On November 9, 2022, the album's certification was updated to platinum.

== Background ==
In May 2018 on Instagram Live, Trippie Redd stated: "It's going to drop around July and I've made over 35 songs for that shit ... I don't know if it's going to be all 35 songs on the album, but I'm going to tell you how it's going to be: There's two parts of the album. There is a more artsy, lyrical part of the album. That's where like, 'Taking a Walk', 'Oomps Revenge', 'Can You Rap Like Me 2', 'How You Feel (song)', all the rock songs, the R&B songs, the very artsy rap songs, and shit are going to be on that side." Redd also said that Erykah Badu and Lil Wayne would appear on the project. Interviewing with XXL on June 28, 2018, Redd stated: "You can expect more rock influences [on the album]. You can expect more R&B. More cultural bangers ... You know, shit like that really. More of everything." The release date and cover art were unveiled on July 31, 2018. The album was then released on August 10.

== Songs ==
=== Overview ===
Speaking via Spotify’s RapCaviar documentary series, Trippie Redd stated: "The general message of Life's a Trip is life is like a hallucination. We have our ups, we have our downs, it’s all over the place, but somehow it all comes together."

=== Tracks 1–3 ===
The album opens with the song "Together", which sees Redd singing about striving to “keep it together” and fighting his inner demons over a rock instrumental. Redd released snippets of the song, then variously titled "Bigger Than Satan" or "A Love Letter Backwards", on April 18 and May 9, 2018. On July 29, the song was released as "Together / Bigger Than Satan", along with an accompanying music video through an unofficial YouTube channel called "TR666Plus". Preston Hooker of The Charger wrote that the song set "the tone of the album", and Eric Skelton of Complex said: "Over stripped-down production anchored by mellow guitars, Trippie's vocals take center stage as he delivers a dark, paranoid set of lyrics." In the album's second track, and fifth single, "Taking a Walk" (released August 6, 2018), Redd sings over a "minimal trap beat". Lyrically, he "asks a nameless other on the Scott Storch-and-Avedon-produced [song] ... whether 'they think I wanna die.'" He also references suicide doors. Redd initially posted a snippet of the song in December 2017, posting a second on April 4, 2018. The latter video depicted him in the studio with Nebu Kiniza. Several publications listed the song as a standout from the album.

Charles Holmes of XXL wrote that the album's third song, "Wish" (Diplo featuring Trippie Redd), completes the opening "trilogy of morbidity". The song was first previewed in October 2017, but underwent substantial changes by the time of its release as part of Diplo's extended play California, released on March 23, 2018. Listeners noticed that Redd's vocals were quieter, with the background vocals removed. On the same day of California's release, Redd posted to Instagram: "Just cried about wish being changed 💔 hurts my soul to have my song rearranged and tampered with when I had it perfectly how I wanted sorry I have failed u guys and I’ll try my best to fix it back [sic]." The original mix of the song then appeared on Life's a Trip in August, labelled "Trippie Mix". Lyrically, Redd discusses suicide and love, referencing Kurt Cobain. A music video for the song, depicting Diplo and Redd in a mansion, was released on April 25, 2018. An alternate music video was released in February 2020, portraying Redd killing clones of himself, before a stand-in actor kills him by mistake, forcing the video crew to dispose of his body. James d'Apice of The Music said: "'Wish' is a contradiction, at once chilled and urgently pulsing." Trevor Smith of HotNewHipHop described the style of the song as almost "bright and fast enough" to be pop radio-friendly, though it has a dark subject matter. Joe Biglin of In Review Online remarked on Redd's shrieking vocals. "Wish" enjoyed a period of renewed consumption after 2025, when the song went viral and entered the Billboard Hot 100 for the first time, debuting at number 88. On February 18, 2026, the song achieved double Platinum certification.

=== Tracks 4–5 ===
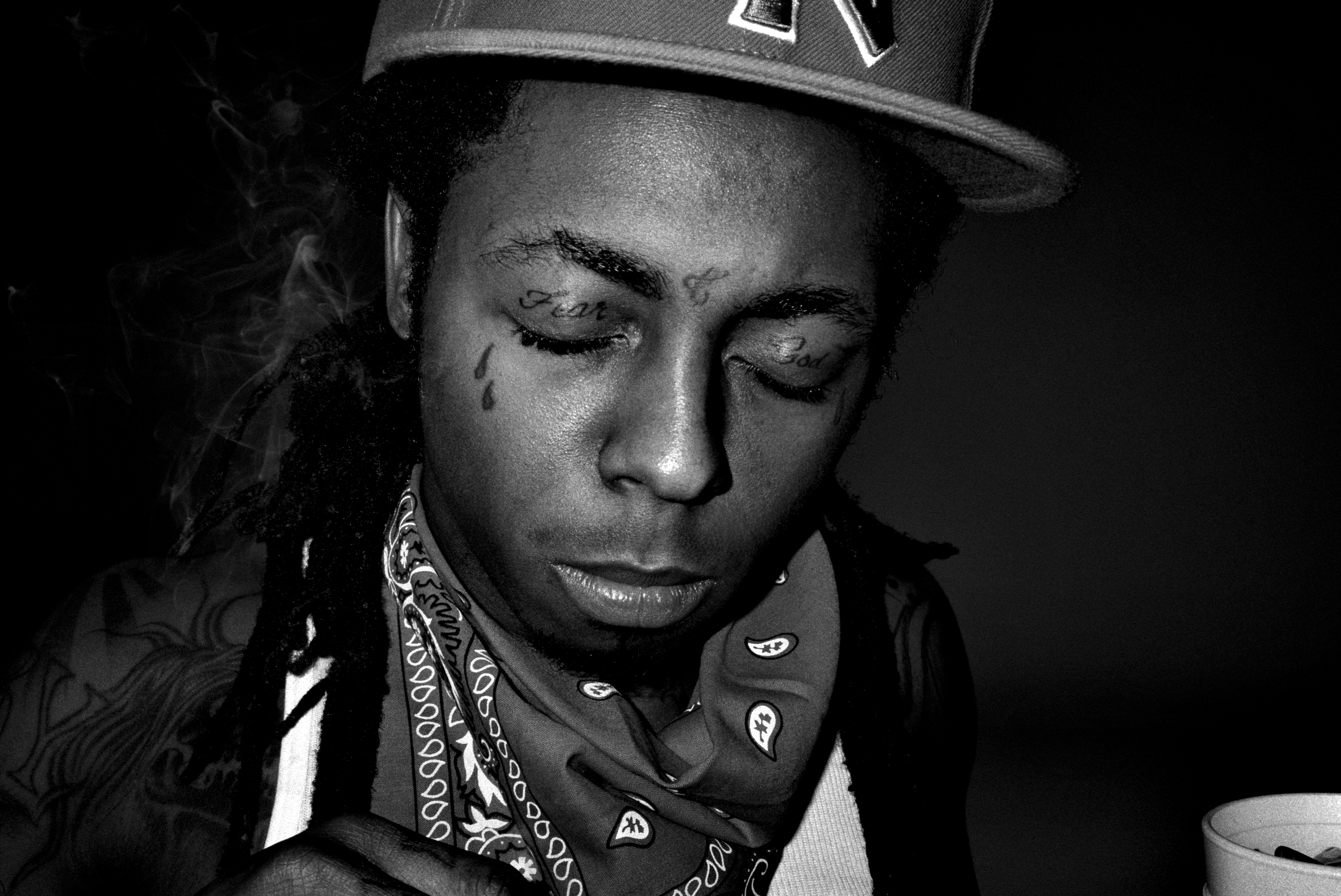
On "Missing My Idols", Trippie Redd details how he likes to "sit back and listen to old Wayne songs", referring to Lil Wayne (pictured in 2006)

The fourth song, "Missing My Idols", sees the album break form into one of its "punchy, energetic raps". The song was originally titled "Can You Rap Like Me 2", and was intended as a sequel to "Can You Rap Like Me" (A Love Letter to You, 2017). It was first previewed on Redd’s Instagram on May 2, 2018. Trey Alston of Revolt further contextualised the song, writing that "'Missing My Idols' is the full version of the fiery snippet that he released a couple of months ago, featuring a plethora of bars that trick you into submission." In the song, Redd pays homage to Lil Wayne and raps several "punchlines". On May 8, 2018, Redd stated that a music video for the song would be released. Subsequently, on 28 June, Redd performed the song as part of his 2018 XXL Freshman freestyle. Kyle Atkinson, writing for K-UTE, named the track amongst the best on the album.

The fifth song, "Forever Ever", produced by Murda Beatz, features Young Thug on the chorus and Reese Laflare. The song was originally titled "Hakuna Matata" before release. Holmes (XXL) opined that the two-song run of "Missing My Idols" and "Forever Ever" constituted "The album’s peak", and "back-to-back perfection". He added that "On 'Forever Ever', Trippie Redd does something that even the most talented rappers have problems accomplishing: He creatively matches Young Thug’s wildest melodic impulses, with both artists delivering their best performances in recent memory." Holmes concluded: "It speaks volumes that Thug’s otherworldly hook is almost outdone by the first four bars of Trippie’s melodic verse, which could’ve easily served as the song’s hook itself." Likewise, Patrick Lyons of HotNewHipHop wrote that the song "shows that Trippie can hang with Young Thug in both departments [melodic and lyrical qualities], which only a handful of other artists can claim." Alphonse Pierre of Pitchfork wrote that "Young Thug rolls through on "Forever Ever" to briefly steal the show and pass the polarizing songbird baton to Trippie."

=== Tracks 6–8 ===
"Bird Shit" – produced by Wheezy – is the sixth song on Life's a Trip. The song was teased by Redd on an Instagram Live on May 20, 2018. Lyrically, Trippie raps about his doubters, dismissing their words as meaningless to him. Lyons wrote that the song was "a rare chance to hear Trippie kick back and relax, which allows him to explore more creative vocal patterns." Contemplating the song's effect, Joe Biglin (In Review Online) wrote that "words mean less for their potential to provoke representational ideas and more as a means of conjuring emotionally-charged imagery. First, the image of 'shit'; second, comparing haters to said shit ('shitty n*ggas is some turds'); and, most importantly, a nonsense title like 'Bird Shit' gives Trippie an excuse to squawk like a bird as loudly as possible in the ad-lib." The next song, "Bang!" (stylized in all capitals), was previewed by Redd in full on Instagram on June 22, 2018. The song "starts unassuming enough with XXXTentacion-reminiscent guitar arpeggios and plodding, yet delicate, sing-song delivery", and the introduction of "tinny high-hat[s]" serves as the beat drop. Biglin added that "nothing can prepare listeners for the moment when Trippie rips through a rockstar wail of “BAAAAAAANG / BAAAAAANG!” And halt the clickbait presses — Trippie is kind of a rockstar." In its extended outro, "Bang!" samples gun sounds from Inuyashiki, an anime television series adaptation. Lyons commended the song, writing that it "manages to pose as a guitar ballad and a turn-up joint at the same time, and might be the best distillation of Trippie's unique skillset to date." Biglin similarly praised the song as a standout, labelling it "perhaps the zenith of Life’s a Trip".

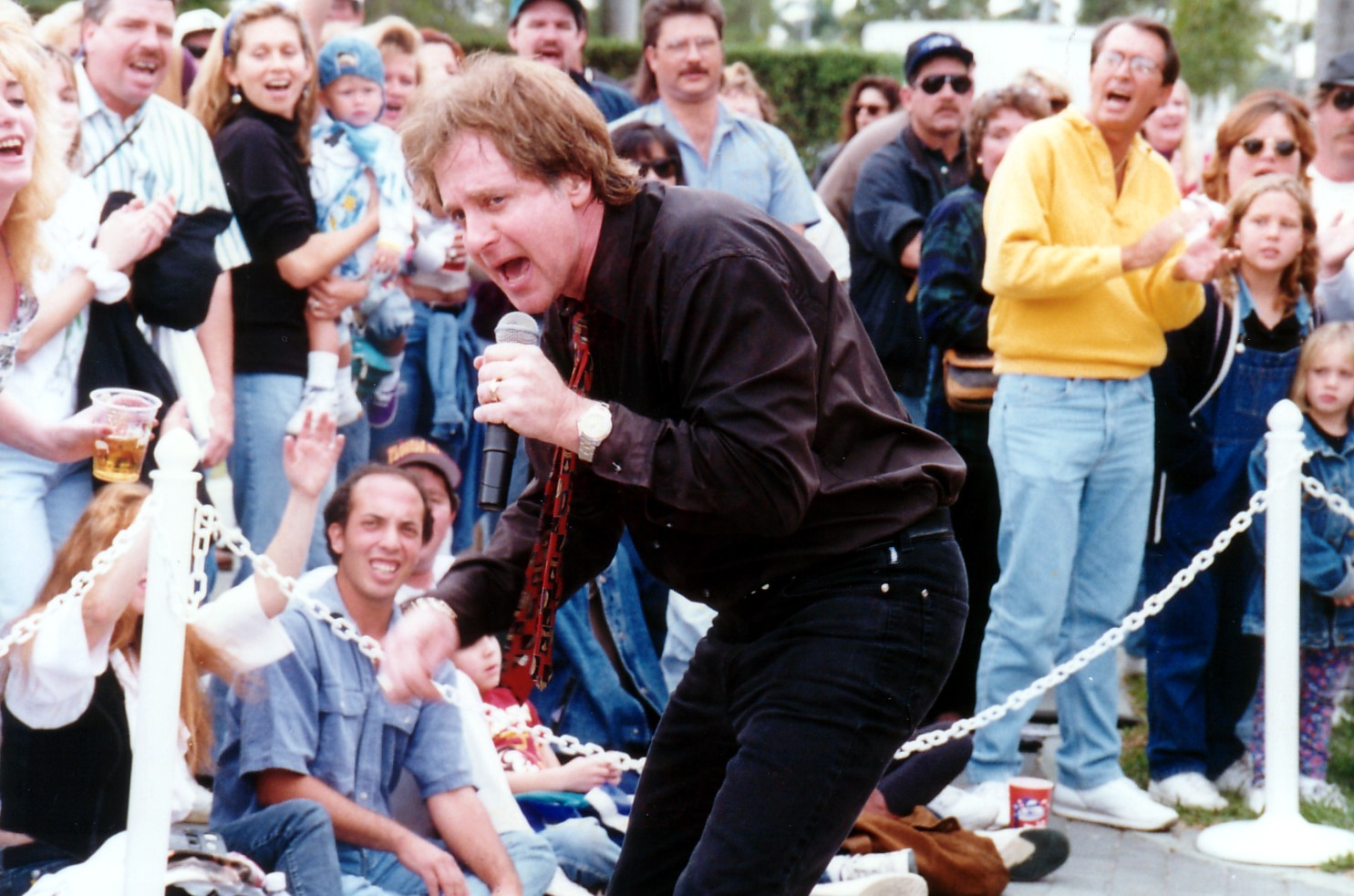
"How You Feel" interpolates "Baby Hold On" by Eddie Money, pictured performing in Florida

"How You Feel" serves as the song's fourth single and eighth track. It was teased on April 9 2018 via Instagram and contains an interpolation of the guitar in Eddie Money's "Baby Hold On". During the song, Redd compares his love for a significant other to that of a Girl Scout for her cookies. Holmes (XXL) opined that Redd was singing to his deceased elder brother, citing the lyric 'If you were here, be so proud' and noting that "his voice sounds heartbroken and raw." Alston (Revolt) wrote that the song constituted one of "the rare glimpses of hope that pokes through the despondent surface". Atkinson (K-UTE) listed the song as a project standout, whilst Lyons (HotNewHipHop) called it the best song from the three drumless tracks on the album ("Together", "How You Feel", and "Underwater FlyZone").

=== Tracks 9–11 ===
"Dark Knight Dummo" (featuring Travis Scott), the album's ninth song, is also its lead single. Producer Honorable C.N.O.T.E. later revealed that he made the beat whilst on Instagram Live, and was inspired to make a dark instrumental by the prospect of war between North Korea and the United States, and that of World War III. He also related that Mike Dean was involved in mixing the vocals, and that the beat was originally intended for rapper Fooly Faime. Trippie Redd originally teased the song via Instagram Live on November 19, 2017, saying: "Can you guess who’s featured on this? He loves cactuses", before singing the hook of Scott’s "90210". On November 20, Scott tweeted the lyrics of the song’s hook. On November 29, Redd uploaded another video to Instagram, teasing Scott's verse in the song. After some leaks, the song was released on December 6, 2017. During the track, Scott declares that "Astroworld's my planet, my home", hinting at his then-upcoming album Astroworld (August 3, 2018). Redd and Scott variously reference Voldo, the Dallas Mavericks, Mister Fantastic, David Blaine and Bloody Mary in the song. An accompanying music video was released on February 20, 2018, depicting Redd and Scott battling a horde of zombies on a farm. The video was directed by White Trash Tyler. Lyons (HotNewHipHop) described it as "clamorous", whilst d'Apice of The Music called it "a schlocky epic, hosting the melodrama of spooky chords overlaid with buzzy paranoia." Hooker (The Charger) stated that the track "stands out as an electric song that is perfect for a mosh pit." Commenting on the musical relationship between Redd and Scott, Alston (Revolt) wrote that "Travis Scott’s excessive use of Auto-Tune juxtaposes with Trippie’s wonderfully stripped voice, making for the latter’s vocals to stand pristine on 'Dark Knight Dummo'." The track became his Redd's first song as a lead artist to chart on the Billboard Hot 100.

The tenth song, "Uka Uka" (stylized in all capitals), was also released as the project's second single. Redd named the song after a Crash Bandicoot character. Lyrically, Redd addresses his haters, saying: "I don't want no more pressure". "Uka Uka" contains a sample of "I Want You" by Marvin Gaye. Pierre (Pitchfork) linked the song to "Bang!", writing that "Producer OZ sets Trippie up with hard-hitters on both "Bang[!]" and "Uka Uka", two songs that pace his vocal explosions perfectly." The next track, "Shake It Up", was first teased during an Instagram Live. It is an explicit song about Redd and his experiences with women performing sexual dances for him, and it makes reference to pumpkin pie, the Twerk Team, the Red Nose pit bull, Uno, Cujo and Bruno Mars. Hamza Riaz of Mic Cheque wrote that "Shake It Up" and "Bang!" made up "The best of the collection", and that the former "thrives off its amusing arrangement, providing a necessary lift to the spirits of the album" despite it being its shortest song.

=== Tracks 12–14 ===
"Oomps Revenge" is the twelfth track on the project, and it serves as a tribute to Redd's late brother, nicknamed Oomp. The song contains a sample of "In Just a Matter of Time" by The Gene Dunlap Band. Alston (Revolt) compared the song to "Missing My Idols", noting Redd's renewed "serious attention to lyrical detail." Atkinson (K-UTE) named the track an album standout, whilst d'Apice (The Music) called it the best song and wrote: "clocking in at an economical two minutes flat, Oomps Revenge is a mission statement masquerading as an interlude." Holmes (XXL) likened the song to "How You Feel", arguing that between the two songs "the ghosts of Redd’s past finally take form." Holmes continued: "On both songs, Trippie honors the memory his fallen brother, offering a rare glimpse of vulnerability that goes deeper than the traditional emo surface of general longing and loss."

The album's thirteenth song, "Gore", is the last of five songs produced by OZ, and was first teased via Instagram on April 20, 2018. In the lyrics, Redd says that if somebody disrespects him, gore would ensue. Alston (Revolt) opined that the song was "reminiscent of Lil Peep’s growl" on "The Brightside" (Come Over When You're Sober, Pt. 1, 2017). The fourteenth and final song, "Underwater FlyZone", uses a rock instrumental, produced by identical twin duo We Are The Stars. It was first teased on Instagram on April 21, 2018.

== Packaging and promotion ==
The lead single, "Dark Knight Dummo", featuring Travis Scott, was released on December 6, 2017. In 2018, this was followed by "Uka Uka" (February 20), "Wish" (March 23), "How You Feel" (June 21), and "Taking a Walk" (August 6).

Life's a Trip's album cover was designed by artist Stephen Gibb, from Windsor, Canada. Gibb stated that he "followed Trippie’s suggestions of making the cover something so visually dynamic that the viewer didn’t know where to look next." He added that "The artwork harkens back to the golden days of album rock and the psychedelic designs of the late 60s and early 70s with an updated sense of pure fun." Mitch Findlay of HotNewHipHop praised the artwork, likening it to J. Cole's KOD (April 2018) and judging that it promised "a hell of a journey." The Windsor Star noted that the placement had "given Gibb his biggest audience yet."

=== Tour ===
Having left Travis Scott's Astroworld – Wish You Were Here Tour in December 2018, reportedly because he was unhappy with short set times, Trippie Redd announced his 'Life's a Trip' tour, captioning the official flyer on Instagram with: "See you fuckn beautiful creatures on TOUR." He was supported by fellow rapper Coi Leray. The tour consisted of 24 shows, beginning at Pop’s (Sauget, Illinois) on January 26, 2019 and ending at the Showbox 5000 (Seattle, Washington) on February 28.

== Critical reception ==
Professional ratings
Review scores
Source	Rating
XXL	XL
HipHopDX	3.8/5
HotNewHipHop	'VERY HOTTTTT'
The Music	4/5 stars
K-UTE	7.6/10
Pitchfork	6.2/10

Aside from a mixed review from Alphonse Pierre of Pitchfork, Life's a Trip received highly favorable reviews. Charles Holmes of XXL described the album as "indulgent, polished and deeply personal", adding that "Vocally, his balance between restrained and bombastic delivery is unmatched." Holmes concluded: "Life's a Trip is a triumph, because it paints Trippie’s painful past as something visceral and real to listeners." Scott Glaysher of HipHopDX praised the album's experimentation and genre-blending, writing: "His young artistry shines through as he paints life pictures across all genres – not just with hi-hats and thundering 808s." Trey Alston of Revolt wrote that "His singing skills may have gained him the recognition of new-age emo rap culture, but he’s proven himself to be one of the best flowing rappers in his age group." Alston thus termed Redd "more musically diverse than his peers"; Patrick Lyons of HotNewHipHop also praised his talent. Sniffers magazine called the release Redd's "biggest individual achievement to date", whilst Preston Hooker of The Charger wrote that it was "an enjoyable listen from start to finish".

In Review Online's Joe Biglin wrote appreciatively that "The rapper revels in the smear of sonic ugliness he creates, with his inexhaustible, constantly morphing vocalizations." Will Kumar of FHHS Today labelled the album an "interesting work that showed multiple sides of himself [Redd]" and that "featured his signature chill, laid back vibe, in addition to a heavier punk-rap feel in a few of the songs as well." Kumar concluded that "Overall, Trippie’s album was very successful and very entertaining to listen to". Similarly, James d'Apice of The Music judged that the project was "well worth your time", adding: "What Redd has managed to achieve in an incredibly short time (he turned 19 this year) is to take his place in the evolution of the form, challenging what we once thought music was all about. Bravo." Kyle Atkinson, writing for K-UTE, complimented the album's beats, vocals and diversity of the project, judging: "This album deserves the attention of hip hop fans everywhere. It may not be for everyone, but it is absolutely a quality album that I think will age well."

However, in a mixed review, Alphonse Pierre of Pitchfork opined that there was monotony in the production and a lack of identity: "Life's a Trip is stuffed with forced production choices that impair Trippie's over-the-top voice from hitting all of its quirks. It's clear Trippie needs more time to develop his sound and iron out a direction that doesn't feel like a detour. A great Trippie Redd album is possible, but first he needs to destroy all of the guitars in his vicinity, block Diplo's cell, and use his voice and Soundcloud rooted style that got him here in the first place." Likewise, Lyons of HotNewHipHop wrote that Trippie Redd "proves his versatility, but often strays away from his strengths", straying away from a "promising formula" established on his previous releases.

=== Year-end lists ===
Select year-end rankings for Life's A Trip
Publication	List	Rank	Ref.
Stereo Vision	The Top 50 Hip-Hop Projects of 2018	48	

== Legacy and influence ==
Life's a Trip is credited with helping to define the emo rap microgenre of hip-hop. In 2018, Joe Biglin of In Review Online wrote that "Trippie’s confident debut is one of the best by a SoundCloud-cultivated artist to date." The same year, K-UTE's Kyle Atkinson wrote that "it ranks among the best projects released from that generation for sure."

== Commercial performance ==
Life's a Trip debuted at number four on the US Billboard 200 with 72,000 album-equivalent units, including 15,000 pure album sales in its first week. From the record project, "Taking a Walk" (46), "Dark Knight Dummo" (72) and "Wish" (79) all charted within the Billboard Hot 100. "Missing My Idols" (2), "Forever Ever" (13), "Bang!" (17) and "Shake It Up" (18) all charted within the Bubbling Under Hot 100.

On October 8, 2020, "Missing My Idols" achieved Gold certification from the Recording Industry Association of America (RIAA). "Forever Ever" achieved the same certification on July 21, 2021. On October 8, 2020, "Shake It Up" achieved Platinum certification from the Recording Industry Association of America (RIAA), whilst "Bang!" went platinum on July 21, 2021. On February 18, 2026, "Wish" achieved double Platinum certification. On November 9, 2022, "Taking a Walk" achieved triple Platinum certification, and "Dark Knight Dummo" achieved triple Platinum certification on November 30, 2022.

On June 20, 2019, the album was certified gold by the Recording Industry Association of America (RIAA) for combined sales and album-equivalent units of over 500,000 units in the United States. On November 9, 2022, the album's certification was updated to platinum, denoting over 1,000,000 units.

== Track listing ==
Credits adapted from Tidal and Qobuz

No.	Title	Writer(s)	Producer(s)	Length
1.	"Together"	Michael White IV; Austin Leech; Conner Leech	We Are the Stars	2:44
2.	"Taking a Walk"	White; Scott Storch; Vincent van den Ende	Storch; Avedon	2:01
3.	"Wish (Trippie Mix)" (Diplo featuring Trippie Redd)	White; Thomas Pentz; Boaz de Jong; Wyatt Sanders; Robin P. Francesco	Diplo; Boaz van de Beatz; Sanders; Yoda Francesco^{[b]}	2:56
4.	"Missing My Idols"	White; Ozan Yildirim; Nik Frascona	OZ; Nik D^{[a]}	2:26
5.	"Forever Ever" (featuring Young Thug and Reese Laflare)	White; Jeffery Williams; Maurice Williams; Shane Lindstrom; Robert Mandell	Murda Beatz; G Koop^{[a]}	3:57
6.	"Bird Shit"	White; Wesley Glass; A. Leech; C. Leech	Wheezy; We Are the Stars	3:48
7.	"Bang!"	White; Yildirim	OZ	4:43
8.	"How You Feel"	White; Austin Schindler; Andrew Franklin; Raynford Humphrey	Austin Powerz; Pro Logic; Preme^{[a]}	4:34
9.	"Dark Knight Dummo" (featuring Travis Scott)	White; Jacques Webster II; Carlton Mays, Jr.	Honorable C.N.O.T.E.	4:16
10.	"Uka Uka"	White; Yildirim; Leon Ware; Arthur Ross	OZ	2:44
11.	"Shake It Up"	White; Yildirim; Nima Jahanbin; Paimon Jahanbin; Angelo Arce; Laraya Robinson	OZ; Wallis Lane^{[a]}	1:56
12.	"Oomps Revenge"	White; Gene Dunlap; Kathy Kosins; Rosamond Bryant	BeatPusher	2:00
13.	"Gore"	White; Yildirim; Jacob Reske	OZ; Reske^{[a]}	2:42
14.	"Underwater FlyZone"	White; A. Leech; C. Leech	We Are the Stars	5:48
Total length:				46:43

Notes

- ^{^[a]} signifies a co-producer
- ^{^[b]} signifies an uncredited additional producer
- "Bang!" and “Uka Uka” are stylized in capital letters.
- "How You Feel" contains an interpolation of "Baby Hold On" by Eddie Money
- "Uka Uka" contains a sample of "I Want You" by Marvin Gaye
- "Oomps Revenge" contains a sample of "In Just a Matter of Time" by The Gene Dunlap Band

== Charts ==
=== Weekly charts ===
Chart (2018)	Peak position
Australian Albums (ARIA)	14
Belgian Albums (Ultratop Flanders)	31
Belgian Albums (Ultratop Wallonia)	45
Canadian Albums (Billboard)	5
Danish Albums (Hitlisten)	23
Dutch Albums (Album Top 100)	14
Estonian Albums (IFPI)	16
Finnish Albums (Suomen virallinen lista)	29
German Albums (Offizielle Top 100)	98
Irish Albums (IRMA)	16
Italian Albums (FIMI)	91
New Zealand Albums (RMNZ)	11
Norwegian Albums (VG-lista)	10
Swedish Albums (Sverigetopplistan)	22
Swiss Albums (Schweizer Hitparade)	39
UK Albums (Official Charts)	19
US Billboard 200	4
US Independent Albums (Billboard)	1
US Top R&B/Hip-Hop Albums (Billboard)	4

=== Year-end charts ===
Chart (2018)	Position
US Billboard 200	134
US Top R&B/Hip-Hop Albums (Billboard)	49

Chart (2019)	Position
US Billboard 200	178

== Certifications ==
Region	Certification	Certified units/sales
Canada (Music Canada)	Platinum	80,000^{‡}
Denmark (IFPI Danmark)	Gold	10,000^{‡}
United Kingdom (BPI)	Silver	60,000^{‡}
United States (RIAA)	Platinum	1,000,000^{‡}
^{‡} Sales+streaming figures based on certification alone.
