= Europa (EP) =

EP by Diplo
- Released: February 22, 2019
- Genre: Dance, electronic
- Length: 16:38
- Label: Mad Decent
- Producer: Diplo

Diplo chronology
| California (2018) | Europa (2019) | LSD (2019) |

Europa is an extended play (EP) by American DJ and record producer Diplo, released in February 2019. The EP highlights European artists. The first single, "Boom Bye Bye", features Niska.

== Reception ==
Pitchfork rated the EP 4.2 out of 10.

== Track listing ==
1. "New Shapes" (featuring Octavian) – 2:45
2. "Boom Bye Bye" (featuring Niska) – 3:46
3. "Dip Raar" (featuring Bizzey and Ramiks) – 2:09
4. "Baui Coupé" (featuring Bausa) – 2:42
5. "Oh Maria" (featuring Soolking) – 2:48
6. "Mira Mira" (featuring IAMDDB) – 2:28

Track listing adapted from the iTunes Store
