= Genre: Sadboy =

2024 collaborative extended play by MGK and Trippie Redd

EP by MGK and Trippie Redd
- Released: March 29, 2024
- Genre: Emo rap
- Length: 27:16
- Labels: EST 19XX; 10K; Interscope
- Producers: SlimXX; Charlie Handsome; BazeXX; Igor "LiveTouch" Mamet; Hunter Roberts; Bloom.; Jeff Bhasker; Hoskins; 80 Root; Ronny J; Cxdy; Fizzle; RRAREBEAR

MGK chronology
Mainstream Sellout (2022)	Genre: Sadboy (2024)	Lost Americana (2025)

Trippie Redd chronology
Saint Michael V2 (2023)	Genre: Sadboy (2024)	NDA (2026)

Singles from Genre: Sadboy
- 1. "Lost Boys" Released: March 26, 2024; 2. "Beauty" Released: April 2, 2024

Genre: Sadboy (stylized as genre : sadboy) is a collaborative extended play by American rappers MGK and Trippie Redd. It was released on March 29, 2024.

== Background ==
MGK and Trippie Redd are both Ohio natives and collaborated on several tracks prior to the release of Genre: Sadboy. They first collaborated in 2019, when Redd was featured on the track "Candy" on MGK's fourth studio album, Hotel Diablo. Redd was featured again on "All I Know", a track off of MGK's 2020 album, Tickets to My Downfall. A majority of the album was recorded at Record Plant Recording Studios in Los Angeles, California.

== Release ==
The duo announced the album in a March 23, 2024, Instagram post featuring a snippet of the song "Lost Boys". On March 25, 2024, in response to a post about the album's release, a producer named Kaixan wrote on X, "the way I just learned I have a beat placement in this this morning and I know it's bout to be the worst song I've ever heard." Following his tweet, Trippie Redd responded and said he was removing Kaixan from the album. On March 26, 2024, they released their first track, "Lost Boys", as a single with an accompanying music video. Genre: Sadboy was released on March 29, 2024. A mini-documentary, directed by Sam Cahill, was released alongside the album, giving fans a look at the rappers' creative process in the studio, as well as behind-the-scenes music video footage.

To promote the album, the duo announced two free concerts, scheduled for April 2, 2024, at Irving Plaza in New York City, and April 4 at the Bluestone in Columbus, Ohio.

== Critical reception ==
Professional ratings
Review scores
Source	Rating
HotNewHipHop	'HOTTTTT'
AllMusic	1.5/5 stars

Genre: Sadboy received generally negative reviews from critics. According to HotNewHipHop, the EP "didn't get the best reviews". Fred Thomas of AllMusic felt that "none of it feels authentic" and concluded that the project "wallows painfully somewhere between unfinished and unlistenable". Sheldon Pearce of NPR felt that "While the surface-level signifiers of emo rap are all here, so are its worst impulses—the genre's meagerness, its latent callowness and underlying futility—and it can never quite blend its two markers into anything transformative."

== Track listing ==
All tracks are written by Colson Baker and Michael Lamar White IV with others noted.

Genre: Sadboy track listing
No.	Title	Writer(s)	Producer(s)	Length
1.	"Lost Boys"	Brandon Allen; Charlie Handsome; Jonathan Joseph Hoskins; Stephen Basil	Charlie Handsome; SlimXX; Hoskins; BazeXX	2:41
2.	"Beauty"	Allen; Charlie Handsome; Lil Aaron; Basil	Charlie Handsome; SlimXX; BazeXX	3:16
3.	"Time Travel"	Gianluca Berluti; Igor "LiveTouch" Mamet	Igor; 80 Root	3:01
4.	"Struggles"	Hunter Roberts; Mamet; Lewin Riddell	Mamet; Bloom.; Roberts	3:17
5.	"Suddenly"	Allen; Charlie Handsome; Jeff Bhasker; Basil	Charlie Handsome; SlimXX; BazeXX; Bhasker^{[c]}	1:47
6.	"Half Dead"	Allen	SlimXX	2:57
7.	"Hiding in the Hills"	Allen; Lil Aaron; Ronny J; Basil	Ronny J; SlimXX; BazeXX	2:31
8.	"No More"	CXDY; Mamet; Josh David Goldenberg	Mamet; Cxdy; Fizzle	2:25
9.	"Who Do I Call"	Alexander Walter Bak; Allen; Charlie Handsome; Destin Route; Robert Richardson; Basil	Charlie Handsome; SlimXX; BazeXX; Bak Beats^{[c]}; Bobby Raps^{[c]}	2:54
10.	"Summer's Gone"	Allen; Charlie Handsome; Roberts; Mamet; Mark J Lombardo; Basil	Roberts; Igor; Rrarebear; BazeXX^{[c]}; SlimXX^{[c]}	2:24
Total length:				27:16

Note

- ^{^[c]} signifies a co-producer.

== Personnel ==
- Colin Leonard – mastering
- Fabian Marasciullo – mixing
- Matthew Testa – mixing
- Shaan Singh – engineering
- Conner Harris McFarland – engineering assistance (tracks 2, 8)
- Sam Zelaya – background vocals (track 3)

== Charts ==
Chart performance for Genre: Sadboy
Chart (2024)	Peak position
Australian Hip Hop/R&B Albums (ARIA)	31
Austrian Albums (Ö3 Austria)	42
Belgian Albums (Ultratop Flanders)	100
Canadian Albums (Billboard)	98
Portuguese Albums (AFP)	167
Swiss Albums (Schweizer Hitparade)	70
UK Album Downloads (Official Charts)	14
US Billboard 200	30
US Top R&B/Hip-Hop Albums (Billboard)	9
