= Eesean Bolden =

American music executive

- Born: Eesean Pare e’ dae Bolden; July 27, 1985 (age 39); Sun Valley, CA, United States
- Occupation(s): Music executive, Entrepreneur
- Years active: 2005–present
- Organization: Culture Jam (Founder & CEO)
- Known for: Saweetie, Lil Pump, Culture Jam

Eesean Bolden (born July 27, 1985) is an American music executive and entrepreneur. He has been the senior Vice President of A&R at Warner Bros since 2016. Bolden also had Epic Records, the division of Sony Entertainment, Inc., and Capitol Records, a division of Universal Music Group. He signed artists such as rapper Silento and songwriter/singer Mary Lambert.

== Early life ==
Bolden grew up in Sacramento, California. His parents, the independent R&B duo EEon LL’GB, wrote, recorded, produced and distributed their album It Taste Too Good, which led to Bolden's decision to pursue a career in music. At age 18, he left college at Sacramento State University to join Interscope Records as an unpaid intern in the A&R department.

== Career ==
He became an executive for Capitol Records in 2011, signing two-time Grammy nominee Mary Lambert. He was involved with rapper Silento’s breakout single “Watch me (Whip/Nae Nae)”, and PTAF of “Bone ass Bitch”. In 2016, Bolden was appointed senior Vice President of artists and repertoire at Warner Bros, and worked there for almost five years. He signed YFN Lucci, Lil Pump, and Saweetie.

In 2021, he released the album Culture Jam which features hip hop artists and athletes. A second Culture Jam album was announced in 2022.

He was one of the recipients of the 7th Annual Toast to Urban Music Executives in 2014.
