= California (Diplo EP) =

EP by Diplo
- Released: March 23, 2018
- Genres: Hip-hop; electronic
- Length: 19:10
- Label: Mad Decent
- Producer: Diplo

Diplo chronology
Skrillex and Diplo Present Jack Ü (2015)	California (2018)	Europa (2019)

California is an extended play (EP) by American DJ and record producer Diplo, released on March 23, 2018, through Mad Decent. The EP features guest appearances from Lil Yachty, Santigold, Desiigner, DRAM, Trippie Redd, Lil Xan, MØ, and GoldLink. It peaked at number 62 on the US Billboard 200.

== Background ==
Diplo announced the EP's track listing on March 15, 2018, with a release date of March 23. Three of its six tracks, featuring Lil Xan, Desiigner, and Trippie Redd, were previously unreleased, while the others were collaborations that Diplo had already released as singles.

== Critical reception ==
Professional ratings
Review scores
Source	Rating
Pitchfork	7.4/10
Salute	2.5/5 stars

California received mixed reviews from critics. Reviewing the EP for Pitchfork, the critic wrote that its understated downtempo production and star-studded guest list recalled the sadness at the heart of Diplo's 2004 debut album Florida, with Diplo asking his typically energetic collaborators to adopt a more subdued approach. The review singled out "Worry No More" as a standout, saying Lil Yachty's plaintive hook gave the song an emotional weight rarely found on Diplo's records, and cited DRAM's performance on "Look Back" and Desiigner's genuinely despondent delivery on "Suicidal" as similar successes. It was more critical of "Wish" and "Color Blind", arguing that their imitation of SoundCloud rap exposed Diplo's calculated pursuit of emo's popularity, and described the latter as "an overproduced mainstream ripoff" that was a poor fit for Lil Xan's delivery. Noting that Diplo had told Annie Mac he envied the freedom of his younger collaborators, the critic suggested the EP might reflect genuine reflection on his part, and concluded that the closing track, "Get It Right", was likely to leave listeners emotionally moved.

Daniel Offner of Salute rated the EP 2.5 out of 5, writing that it revealed a more hip-hop-centric side of Diplo. Offner highlighted the guest appearances from young artists, including Desiigner on "Suicidal", Trippie Redd on "Wish", which he said addresses past relationships and heartache, and Lil Xan on the emo rap track "Color Blind". He also described "Look Back" as a blend of R&B and indie rock influences. Offner concluded that the EP has "just as many highs as it does lows" and, at times, seemed to try too hard to appeal to younger audiences rather than collaborating with artists such as Dave East or Nipsey Hussle.

== Track listing ==
All tracks are produced by Diplo.

California track listing
No.	Title	Length
1.	"Worry No More" (featuring Lil Yachty and Santigold)	3:22
2.	"Suicidal" (featuring Desiigner)	3:26
3.	"Look Back" (featuring DRAM)	3:39
4.	"Wish" (featuring Trippie Redd)	2:55
5.	"Color Blind" (featuring Lil Xan)	2:56
6.	"Get It Right" (featuring MØ and GoldLink; remix)	2:52
Total length:		19:10

== Charts ==
Chart performance for California
Chart (2018)	Peak position
Australian Albums (ARIA)	58
Canadian Albums (Billboard)	39
French Albums (SNEP)	160
Irish Albums (IRMA)	65
New Zealand Albums (RMNZ)	27
US Billboard 200	62
US Independent Albums (Billboard)	48
US Top R&B/Hip-Hop Albums (Billboard)	31
