= Dark Knight Dummo =

2017 single by Trippie Redd featuring Travis Scott

Single by Trippie Redd featuring Travis Scott

from the album Life's a Trip
- Released: December 6, 2017
- Recorded: 2017
- Genre: Trap; cloud rap
- Length: 4:16
- Label: Elliot Grainge Entertainment, LLC
- Songwriters: Michael White II; Jacques Webster II; Carlton Mays, Jr.
- Producer: Da Honorable C.N.O.T.E.

Trippie Redd singles chronology
"Ill Nana" (2017)	"Dark Knight Dummo" (2017)	"18" (2018)

Travis Scott singles chronology
"Deserve" (2017)	"Dark Knight Dummo" (2017)	"Krippy Kush (Travis Scott Remix)" (2017)

Music video
- "Dark Knight Dummo" on YouTube

"Dark Knight Dummo" is a song by American rapper Trippie Redd featuring fellow American rapper Travis Scott. It was released on December 6, 2017 as the lead single from Redd's debut studio album, Life's a Trip. It is his first single as a lead artist to chart on the Billboard Hot 100, and is certified 2× Platinum by the RIAA.

== Music video ==
The music video was released on February 20, 2018, and features Trippie Redd and Travis Scott battling a horde of zombies on a farm. The video is directed by White Trash Tyler and was released to Redd's official YouTube channel. As of 2026, the video has over 200 million views.

== Charts ==
Chart (2017–2018)	Peak position
Canada Hot 100 (Billboard)	93
New Zealand Heatseekers (Recorded Music NZ)	9
US Billboard Hot 100	72
US Hot R&B/Hip-Hop Songs (Billboard)	29

== Certifications ==
Region	Certification	Certified units/sales
Canada (Music Canada)	3× Platinum	240,000^{‡}
New Zealand (RMNZ)	Platinum	30,000^{‡}
Portugal (AFP)	Gold	5,000^{‡}
United Kingdom (BPI)	Silver	200,000^{‡}
United States (RIAA)	3× Platinum	3,000,000^{‡}
^{‡} Sales+streaming figures based on certification alone.
