= Topanga (song) =

2018 single by Trippie Redd

Single by Trippie Redd

from the album A Love Letter to You 3
- Released: October 22, 2018
- Length: 3:35
- Label: TenThousand
- Songwriters: Michael White; Darrel Jackson; Anthony Brown
- Producer: Chopsquad DJ

Trippie Redd singles chronology
"Taking a Walk" (2018)	"Topanga" (2018)	"Alright" (2019)

Music video
- "Topanga" on YouTube

"Topanga" is a song by American rapper Trippie Redd. It was released on October 22, 2018, as the lead single from his third mixtape A Love Letter to You 3 by TenThousand Projects. The title of the song references the city of Topanga, California.

== Background ==
In September 2018, Trippie Redd posted a snippet of the song as well as the single's cover, which was inspired by one of his personal muses, Gorillaz. He appears in religious attire while levitating in the artwork. Redd premiered the song through Zane Lowe's Beats 1 on October 22, 2018. He described the song as "Singing real shit that people all over the world can relate to — timeless."

== Composition ==
The song has been described as "mellow" and samples "It Ain't Over" by Maurette Brown Clark. It begins with melodic piano riff and moves into an uptempo instrumental.

== Charts ==
Chart (2018)	Peak position
Canada Hot 100 (Billboard)	68
New Zealand Hot Singles (RMNZ)	14
UK Singles (OCC)	88
US Billboard Hot 100	52
US Hot R&B/Hip-Hop Songs (Billboard)	23
US Rhythmic Airplay (Billboard)	29

== Certifications ==
Region	Certification	Certified units/sales
Canada (Music Canada)	2× Platinum	160,000^{‡}
New Zealand (RMNZ)	Platinum	30,000^{‡}
United Kingdom (BPI)	Silver	200,000^{‡}
United States (RIAA)	2× Platinum	2,000,000^{‡}
^{‡} Sales+streaming figures based on certification alone.
