= K-UTE =

Coordinates: 40°46′03″N 111°50′16″W

K-UTE Radio
- Salt Lake City, Utah; United States
- Broadcast area: University of Utah

Programming
- Format: College radio

Ownership
- Owner: University of Utah

History
- First air date: 1988

Links
- Webcast: Listen Live
- Website: Official Website

K-UTE Radio is a college radio station broadcasting via the internet to the campus of the University of Utah and around the world. The station primarily plays music from independent artists and several student produced shows, which range from talk to different types of music sets. The station can be heard on Channel 99 cable on campus, via an iPhone app, as well as online at its website. The station receives most of its music from the College Music Journal and from students themselves. As of 2009, the station is operating normally.

== History ==
K-UTE has been broadcasting to the University of Utah since 1988. The station lost its "over the air" broadcast in 2005 when the nearby dormitories were taken down. In late 2007 and early 2008, a new antenna was constructed and in February 2008, the station was once again broadcasting on its AM frequency. Ever since its sign on, the station has experienced financial trouble and has almost been shut down several times. The student government on campus (known as ASUU) cut the station's funding in 2007, and had to operate financially on the station's reserve funding.

In early 2007, a controversy over a sex hotline and vandalism of the studio led to the firing of two DJs hosting a popular show known as "Behind The Blue Door."

Despite the on-air behavior, the University of Utah's student government, ASUU, reinstated funding for the station in 2008.

From 2009 to 2011, Jamis Johnson, Bob Kubichek, and Sean Halls sequentially led the station under the guidance of Peter Rugh, graduate fellow. Jamis was responsible for organizing a group of students and the financial resources to pay back fines to the RIAA. This fine was retroactive and was over $10,000 to bring the station back in compliance, allowing K-UTE to broadcast again.

Noting the unreliable cyclical funding of ASUU throughout the history of the station, Halls and Rugh worked with The Daily Utah Chronicle's leadership team to instead derive consistent funding for campus media, including the radio station, through an evergreen student fee. This largely solved the cash flow problems created when ASUU had a governing body who would insist on an audit of K-UTE and then withdraw funding. Being an AM station the majority of its existence, the station would routinely fail this audit as it could not reliably prove listenership.

In 2016, the station considered adding an FM signal but abandoned that proposition due to a lack of funding.

== Methods of listening ==
K-UTE can be heard via two methods.

- U-TV, the cable network of the University of Utah carries the station on channel 99, with Powerpoint advertisements for the station and some of its shows.
- Webcast - available via the station's website. The webcast was shut down in 2007 because of fees imposed by the Recording Industry Association of America (RIAA). Those fees have since been paid and the station is back online. In spite of past arguments between the station and ASUU they passed a special measure for the funding necessary to cover the RIAA costs.
