= Hashtag NDA =

#NDA

Studio album by Trippie Redd
- Released: August 28, 2026
- Genre: Hip-hop
- Length: 51:05
- Labels: 10K Projects; 1400 Entertainment
- Producers: ATL Jacob; RushDee; 1hirosix; 808-H; Acog; andrzxz; Bosley; Byesheldon; CLOUD 48; destiiinyvv; HighRoller; Igor Mamet; Keegan; Kuji; Kyuro; madd maks; Maisonarchive; Mikey Mikey; Miloo; nadroj501; Prod. Comet; plenty; ProdByApollo; Rosen Beatz; rprpxrprp; Sammy Haig; skreer; Sohi; southboy; tainiykick; Theevoni; thr6x; tjriverss; tooeazy; trisstt; typhelicia; VAbits; whysobored; Wolf; wysa; Zerum

Trippie Redd chronology
NDA (2026)	#NDA (2026)

Professional ratings
Review scores
Source	Rating
Ratings Game Music	B-

#NDA is the seventh studio album by American rapper Trippie Redd, serving as a "part two" to his album NDA, which was released exactly two weeks prior. It was released by 10K Projects and 1400 Entertainment on August 28, 2026. It features guest appearances by Gigi Holland, K Suave and Tezzus.

== Background ==
On August 12, 2026, Trippie Redd took to social media to clarify that he would be dropping two albums in the same month, with NDA serving as the first and #NDA serving as the second.

On August 19, 2026, he shared two potential artworks for the album on social media, and allowed fans to vote on which cover to use. The following day, he announced that the album would be released on August 28.

The album's track listing was revealed on August 25, 2026.

It failed to reach any known chart.

== Track listing ==
#NDA track listing
No.	Title	Writer(s)	Producer(s)	Length
1.	"DontWaitForMe"	Michael Lamar White II; Lee Dong Reoyl	Prod. Comet; Theevoni; Zerum	3:14
2.	"Wanna Fly Away"	White II; Maxwell Josef Madejczyk; Jason Rosenberg; Tyler-Justin A. Sharpe; Abilov Vladislav Vadimovich	destiiinyvv; Kyuro; Rosen Beatz; thr6x; whysobored	2:52
3.	"Trillionaire Club"	White II; Matt Bosley; Sammy Haig; Markos Muñiz; Daniel Greene	Bosley; Sammy Haig; madd maks; Sohi	2:29
4.	"KingofTheWorld"	White II; Harold Sullivan	808-H; tooeazy	3:00
5.	"Kiss the Ring"	White II; Sullivan	ProdByApollo; tooeazy; CLOUD 48; 808-H; plenty	2:36
6.	"Tuck Your Chain"	White II; Sullivan	808-H; andrzxz; VAbits	2:07
7.	"Wanna Be a Trillionaire"	White II; Sharpe; Vadimovich	thr6x; whysobored; wysa	2:18
8.	"SVM3"	White II; Sharpe; Vadimovich	thr6x; typhelicia; whysobored	4:14
9.	"No Rewards"	White II; Bosley	plenty; Bosley; 1hirosix; Keegan	1:58
10.	"Keep Flying"	White II; Sharpe; Vadimovich	thr6x; whysobored	2:29
11.	"Being Myself" (with Tezzus)	White II; T'Corrian Walton; Sharpe; Vadimovich; Rosenberg; Igor Mamet; Daniel Soto	thr6x; whysobored; tainiykick; Igor Mamet; Rosen Beatz; Wolf	3:23
12.	"Plead the 5th"	White II; Kai French	Acog; Byesheldon; Mikey Mikey	2:50
13.	"Med Kit" (with K Suave)	White II; Kevin Gainer	rprpxrprp; southboy; trisstt	3:51
14.	"Different Colors"	White II; Bosley; Muñiz; Damir Minyaev	Bosley; HighRoller; madd maks; Miloo	1:42
15.	"Rock the Bed" (with Gigi Holland)	White II; Bosley; T.J. Rivers; Shauntrell Watts, Jr.; Aubrey Drake Graham; Carl Eugene Lilly Jr.; Jarvis Antonio Mills; Dwayne Michael Carter Jr.; Onika Tanya Maraj-Petty; Stephen Ellis Garrett Jr.; Micheal Ray Stevenson; Daniel Andrew Johnson; Timothy Zachery Mosley	Bosley; tjriverss	3:28
16.	"Emo Pop"	White II; Jacob Denzal Canady; Ofer Shaul Ishai; RushDee McCoy Williams	ATL Jacob; Kuji; nadroj501; RushDee	3:03
17.	"YouDontReallyLove"	White II; Reoyl	Prod. Comet; Theevoni; Zerum	2:54
18.	"Miss My Dogs"	White II; Sullivan	808-H; Maisonarchive; skreer; VAbits	2:30
Total length:				51:05
