= Nebu Kiniza =

American rapper (born 1994)

- Born: Cory Orville Reid; March 30, 1994 (age 32); Queens, New York
- Genres: Hip hop; trap
- Years active: 2010–present
- Labels: OSHS; RCA
- Website: nebukiniza.com

Cory Orville Reid (born March 30, 1994), better known by his stage name Nebu Kiniza, is an American rapper from Queens, New York. He is best known for his single "Gassed Up", which was released on October 25, 2015 and certified platinum in the United States in May 2018. He is signed to OSHS (On Some Hippy S**t) and RCA Records.

== Early life ==
Nebu Kiniza's family moved from Queens to Pawling, NY and then to Conyers, a suburb of Atlanta, GA, when he was 10. He learned the ropes of the music business from his mother, a singer. Attending Rockdale County High School, he began freestyling at 15 and discovered his talent.

== Career ==
He released his first track, "IDGAF," in 2011, and his first mixtape, 2 Peace Signs, in 2012.

In 2013, he released his second mixtape, The Honor Roller, with music videos for the tracks "The Grind" and "Steez." The "Steez" video, shot in Atlanta's Little Five Points neighborhood, received over 300,000 views on YouTube.

His third mixtape, Hypnosis, which featured production from American record producer Sonny Digital, was released in 2014. The track "Myself" became his first major hit and was remixed by ILoveMakonnen & Key!.

Along the way Nebu created his own label, On Some Hippy Sh*t, for himself and his crew of producers.

His biggest hit to date, "Gassed Up," produced by MexikoDro – a track that he has said took all of 15 minutes to create – received over 52 million listens on SoundCloud, 34 million views on YouTube and 80 million plays on Spotify. Kiniza reached #10 on the Next Big Sound chart (24 December 2016), and "Gassed Up" hit #15 on the Spotify Velocity chart and #18 on BigChampagne's Emerging Artist chart on 2 March 2017.

With respect to his moniker, he explained that his aunt jokingly suggested naming him after King Nebuchadnezzar when he was born. He thus felt identified with the name for his whole life, and adapted it for real when it was time to adopt a stage name. "Nebu stands for the golden one. Kiniza stands for being originally creative and artistic. So I put two-and-two together."

== Stage name ==
His stage name references the biblical King Nebuchadnezzar II.

== Discography ==
=== Mixtapes ===
List of mixtapes, with date released
Title	Album details
2 Peace Signs	Released: February 26, 2012; Labels: Self-released; Format: Digital download
The Honor Roller	Released: January 28, 2013; Labels: Self-released; Format: Digital download
Hypnosis	Released: June 29, 2014; Labels: Self-released; Format: Digital download

=== Singles ===
==== As lead artist ====
List of singles as lead artist, with selected chart positions
Title	Year	Peak chart positions		Certifications
Title	Year	US Bub.	US R&B/HH	
"Myself"	2015	—	—	
"All Good"	2015	—	—	
"Call It What You Want"	2015	—	—	
"Hop Out"	2016	—	—	
"Gassed Up"	2016	3	45	RIAA: 2× Platinum
"Fuck It Up"	2017	—	—	
"Lit"	2017	—	—	
"—" denotes a recording that did not chart or was not released in that territory.

==== As featured artist ====
List of singles as featured artist, with showing year released
Title	Year
"In the Sky" (Ryan Hemsworth featuring Nebu Kiniza)	2016
