= Trippie Redd =

American rapper (born 1999)

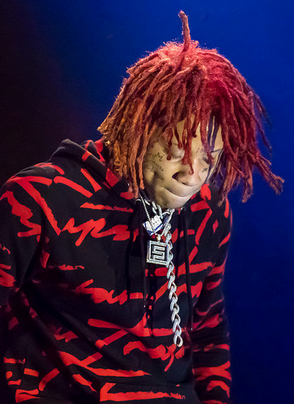
- White in 2018

Background information
- Also known as: 1400; Big 14; Trippie Hippie; Cherry Bomb; Cherry Blossom
- Born: Michael Lamar White II; June 18, 1999 (age 27); Canton, Ohio, U.S.
- Genres: Experimental hip-hop; trap; R&B; cloud rap; rage; alternative rock; rap rock; pop-punk; emo rap
- Occupations: Rapper; singer; songwriter
- Works: Trippie Redd discography
- Years active: 2012–present
- Labels: 10K Projects; ADA; 1400; Virgin; Atlantic
- Partners: Emani 22 (2018); Coi Leray (2019, 2024–2025); Skye Morales (2021–2023)
- Children: 1
- Website: www.trippieredd.com

Michael Lamar White II (born June 18, 1999), known professionally as Trippie Redd, is an American rapper, singer, and songwriter. Born and raised in Canton, Ohio, he has contributed to the progression of emo rap and rage, a subgenre of trap music.

His debut mixtape, A Love Letter to You (2017) was released by Elliot Grainge's 10K Projects and entered the Billboard 200, while its lead single, "Love Scars" received double platinum certification by the Recording Industry Association of America (RIAA). A Love Letter to You 2 followed shortly after. In 2018, he released his debut studio album Life's a Trip and A Love Letter to You 3; their singles, "Dark Knight Dummo" (featuring Travis Scott), "Taking a Walk", and "Topanga" each entered the Billboard Hot 100. The album and its follow-up, ! (2019) both reached the top five of the Billboard 200, while his fourth mixtape, A Love Letter to You 4 (2019), topped the chart.

Redd's third and fourth albums Pegasus (2020) and Trip at Knight (2021), both peaked at number two on the Billboard 200. The latter's lead single, "Miss the Rage" (with Playboi Carti), peaked at number 11 on the Billboard Hot 100 and remains his highest-charting song. Redd's fifth album, Mansion Musik (2023), peaked at number three on the Billboard 200, while his sixth mixtape, A Love Letter to You 5 (2023), peaked at number 13. His sixth and seventh albums, NDA and #NDA, released within two weeks of each other in 2026 and were met with declining commercial performance.

Redd has released the album Neon Shark vs Pegasus (2021) – a deluxe reissue of Pegasus – in collaboration with American punk rock drummer Travis Barker. He has also released the collaborative extended play (EP), Genre: Sadboy (2024), with fellow Ohio-based rapper MGK.

== Early life ==
Redd was born and raised in Canton, Ohio, and grew up on 14th Street. He joined the Bloods at a young age and formed a group called "1400/800", based on the street he grew up on. Redd has a younger brother, and had an older brother who made music under the name "Dirty Redd" who was killed in a car accident in 2014. Redd grew up in Canton, though he moved to Columbus, Ohio, several times. His interest in music began when his mother played Ashanti, Beyoncé, Tupac Shakur, and Nas while Redd was growing up. He later listened to artists such as T-Pain, Kiss, Nirvana, Gucci Mane, Fountains of Wayne, the Ataris, Green Day, the Offspring, Cute Is What We Aim For, Simple Plan, the Summer Set, Hit the Lights, Marilyn Manson and Lil Wayne.

Redd began rapping after being inspired by Taevion Williams, another rapper who went by the stage name Lil Tae. Redd began taking his music career seriously and began recording music, releasing "Sub-Zero" and "New Ferrari" in 2014 but soon deleting those songs. Following his high school graduation, Redd moved to Atlanta, where he met rapper Lil Wop and was eventually offered a deal with a record label.

== Career ==
=== 2016–2018: Career beginnings and Life's a Trip ===
Lil Wop helped Redd get started with a professional recording studio. They began working with Kodie Shane and recorded three projects: Awakening My Inner Beast, Beast Mode and Rock the World Trippie. Redd eventually signed to the label Strainge Entertainment (now known as Elliot Grainge Entertainment) and relocated to Los Angeles.

On May 26, 2017, Redd released his debut mixtape, A Love Letter to You, with the lead single "Love Scars". The mixtape peaked at number 64 on Billboard 200 over 4 months after its release, staying on the chart for 45 weeks.

Redd was the sole feature on XXXTentacion's album 17, the song "Fuck Love" which peaked at number 28 on the Billboard Hot 100. In 2023, the song was certified Diamond by the RIAA for moving over 10 million units, becoming Redd's first song to achieve this.

On October 6, 2017, Redd released his second mixtape, A Love Letter to You 2. The album debuted at number 34 on the Billboard 200. Later that month, Redd released a collaboration EP with Lil Wop, Angels & Demons.

On December 6, 2017, Redd released the single "Dark Knight Dummo", featuring Travis Scott. The song peaked at 72 on the Billboard Hot 100, making it Redd's first entry on the chart as a lead artist. On December 25, 2017, Redd released the song "TR666" on his SoundCloud account, which features Swae Lee and was produced by Scott Storch. The track was previewed on November 30. Redd released "18" alongside Baauer, Kris Wu, Joji and Rich Brian.

In an interview with Billboard in March 2018, Redd said his debut studio album would feature collaborations with Lil Wayne and Erykah Badu. In July 2018, soon after the passing of his close friend XXXTentacion, Redd announced that the album would be titled Life's a Trip and be 26 tracks long; he later trimmed it to 16 tracks. Redd released the singles "Me Likey" and "How You Feel" on June 22, 2018, and "Taking a Walk" on August 6, 2018. Life's a Trip was released August 10, 2018, and debuted at number four on the Billboard 200 album chart, with the single "Taking a Walk" debuting at number 46 on the Billboard Hot 100 chart. Later in 2018, Redd released A Love Letter to You 3, which reached number three on the Billboard 200.

=== 2019–2020: !, A Love Letter to You 4, and Pegasus ===
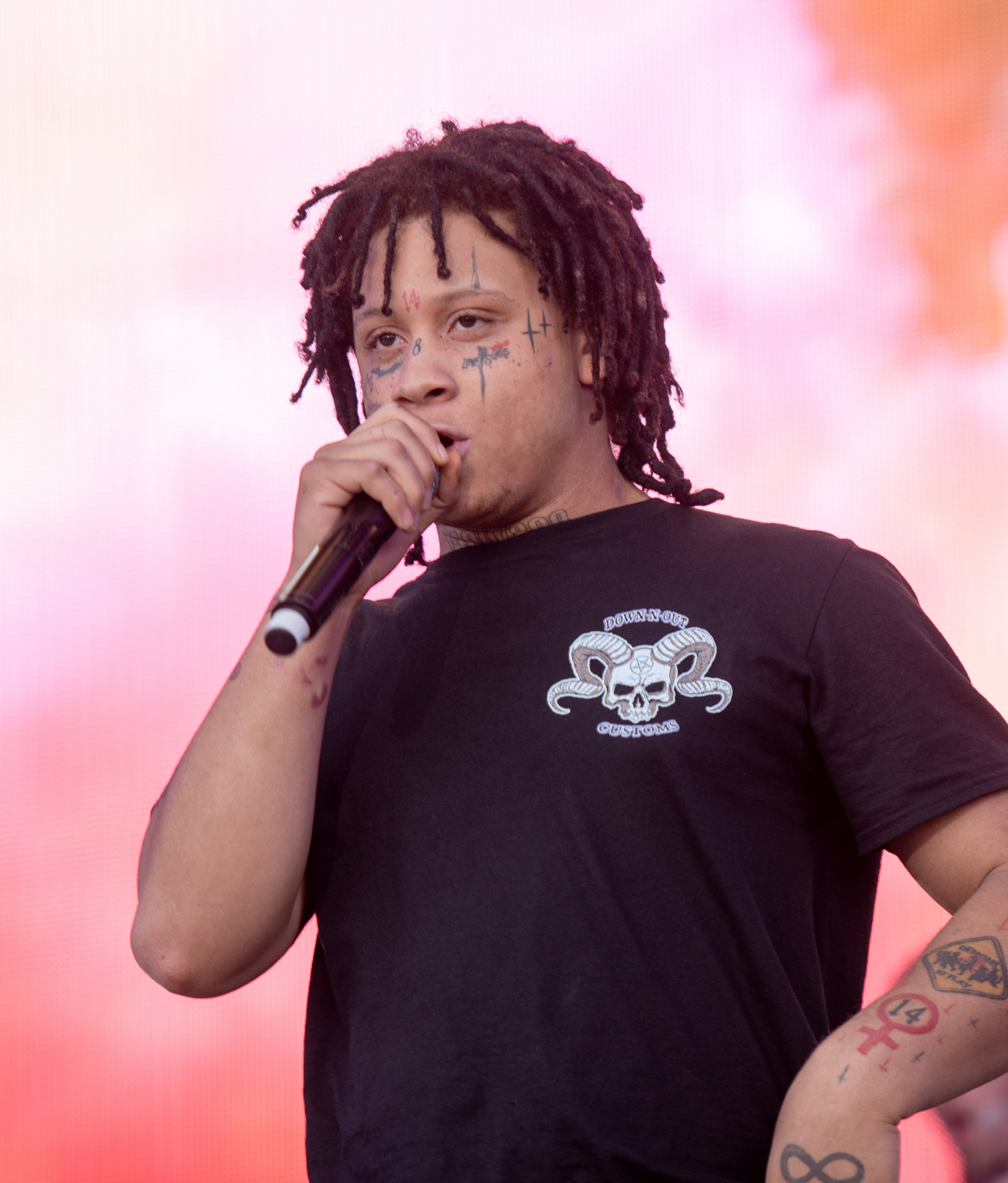
Redd performing in 2019

On May 29, 2019, Redd released "Under Enemy Arms", the lead single to his second studio album !. On July 24, 2019, Redd released the second single for the album, "Mac 10", featuring Lil Baby and Lil Duke. The album was released on August 9, 2019, and debuted at number three on the US Billboard 200 with 51,000 album-equivalent units. The album received lukewarm receives and, amid criticism, Redd removed the song "They Afraid Of You", featuring Playboi Carti, from the album. Redd went on to release A Love Letter to You 4 that November. The mixtape debuted at number one on the Billboard 200, becoming his first chart-topping album.

Following this, Redd was featured on many songs in the first half of 2020. He appeared on English YouTuber, media personality, and rapper KSI's single "Wake Up Call", which was released on January 31, 2020. The song serves as the second single to the latter's debut studio album, Dissimulation. The song reached number 11 on the UK Singles Chart. He also released a collaboration with Juice Wrld titled "Tell Me U Luv Me", which reached the top 40 on the Billboard Hot 100. On May 15, 2020, Redd released the single "Excitement" with PartyNextDoor, as the lead single for his third studio album, Pegasus. On June 18, which was his 21st birthday, he released another single titled "Dreamer", a single for Neon Shark, the deluxe edition of Pegasus, which would be his "rock album". On August 18, the entire album leaked after Redd had stated that he would delay the album even further if more of his music continued to leak online. On September 11, he released the single "I Got You", featuring Busta Rhymes, as the second single from Pegasus. On October 7, he released the third and final single, "Sleepy Hollow", from the album. The album was released on October 30, 2020, and debuted at number two on the Billboard 200.

=== 2021–2022: Trip at Knight and Neon Shark vs Pegasus ===
Redd began the year by releasing the deluxe edition of Pegasus, a rock reissue titled Neon Shark vs Pegasus. He later announced his fourth studio album Trip at Knight, which was expected to release later in the year. In the lead-up to the album's release, Redd released two high-profile collaborations. The first, "Miss the Rage" with Playboi Carti, debuted at number 11 on the Billboard Hot 100, becoming the highest-charting single of Redd's career. The second lead single was "Holy Smokes" featuring Lil Uzi Vert, which peaked at number 50 on the Hot 100. On August 11, Redd announced the album's tracklist, as well as a tour set to begin on August 25. Trip at Knight released on August 20, 2021, with the song "Betrayal" featuring Drake added to the album's track listing a day late on August 21.

On September 9, 2021, someone had opened fire on Redd's tour bus, striking the driver.

=== 2023–present: Mansion Musik, A Love Letter to You 5, Genre: Sadboy, and NDA ===
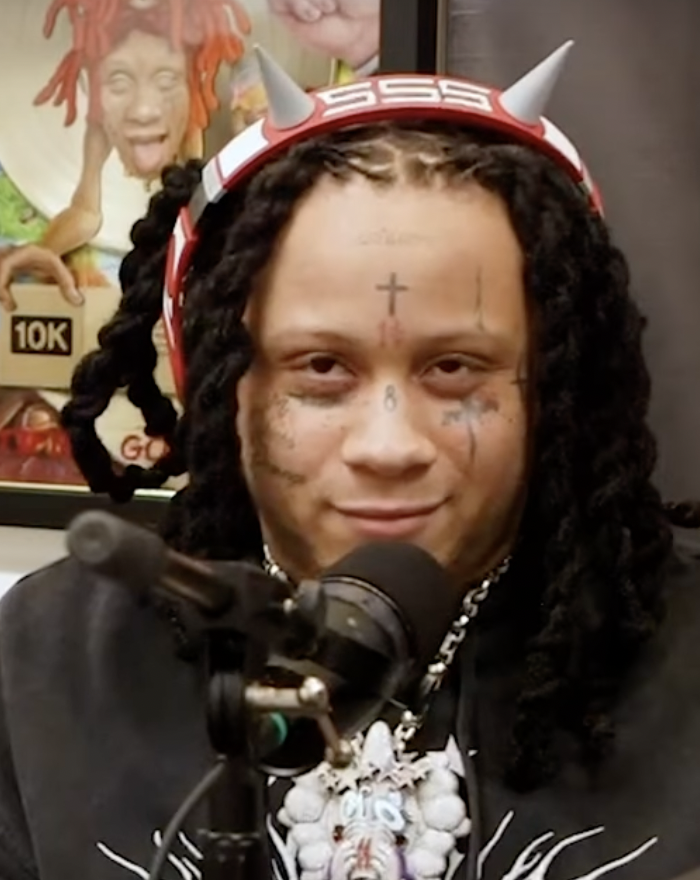
Trippie Redd in 2023

Redd released his fifth studio album, Mansion Musik on January 20, 2023. The album peaked at number 3 on the Billboard 200 and saw mixed reviews. Redd's fifth commercial mixtape A Love Letter to You 5 released on August 11, 2023.

In late 2023, Redd released his 7-track EP, Saint Michael. Subsequently, Saint Michael V2, an expanded edition of the project, would release in November 2023.

In March 2024, Redd announced a collaborative extended play with American musician MGK, titled Genre: Sadboy. It was released on March 29, 2024, to negative reviews.

In early October 2024, KSI and Redd released the single "Thick of It".

Redd's sixth album, NDA, was released through 10K Projects and 1400 Entertainment on August 14, 2026; he released the singles "Woke Up" and "The Face" in July 2025. On August 28, 2026; he released the “part two” for NDA, #NDA.

== Artistry ==
Redd's influence upon the progression of emo rap and rage is widely acknowledged.

== Feuds ==
=== 6ix9ine ===
On April 13, 2017, 6ix9ine featured on Redd's song "Poles 1469" and in July 2017, he was also featured on Redd's song "Owee". Following a post from a Twitter account claiming 6ix9ine was a pedophile, Redd denounced 6ix9ine. On November 11, 2017, Redd was attacked in a New York hotel and claimed that a member of 6ix9ine's team ambushed him. 6ix9ine later insinuated his involvement. In February 2018, 6ix9ine was assaulted by several men outside of a Los Angeles airport shortly after arguing with Redd on Instagram. 6ix9ine and Redd continued to trade insults over social media in February 2018 and March 2018.

In May 2018, 6ix9ine started a feud with rapper Tadoe and Chief Keef over allegations that Tadoe had abused artist Cuban Doll for talking to 6ix9ine. Redd supported Tadoe in the feud and went on to release a diss track toward 6ix9ine, "I Kill People", featuring Tadoe and Chief Keef. 6ix9ine also accused Redd of having sexual relations with fellow rapper Danielle Bregoli, also known as Bhad Bhabie, who was a minor at the time. Redd and Bregoli denied the accusation, but the latter admitted that the two had kissed in the past: "We kissed but it wasn't that serious and he was 17 at the time." On September 17, 2019, 6ix9ine has stated in a testimony that Redd has been involved with the Five Nine Brims gang.

=== XXXTentacion ===
In October 2017, a preview of Drake's song "God's Plan" was shown on social media. The song originally featured Redd singing the hook and giving an additional verse. Florida rapper Jahseh Onfroy, known by his stage name XXXTentacion, who had prior issues with Drake, began to associate with 6ix9ine, to Redd's chagrin. In March 2018, Onfroy "banned" Redd from Florida, promising to assault him if he attempted to enter the state. Onfroy apologized to Redd during a performance later that month and the two reconciled after Redd accepted his apology. Redd and Onfroy went on to collaborate on multiple occasions.

Following XXXTentacion's death on June 18, 2018, which was also Redd's 19th birthday, Redd dyed his hair in memory of the artist and released "Ghost Busters", a collaboration with Quavo, XXXTentacion, and Ski Mask the Slump God in memoriam. In a 2021 interview, Redd said that he still thought about XXXTentacion every day. On Redd's 2021 album Trip at Knight, a posthumous reworked version of "Ghost Busters" with Redd and XXXTentacion entitled "Danny Phantom" was released.

== Personal life ==
Redd said in March 2018 that he was worth $7 million and purchased his mother a $300,000 house. In 2022, Redd signed a $30 million record deal with 10K Projects. After signing the deal, he purchased a $7.5 million Florida mansion.

He was previously linked to rapper Aylek$. In 2021, he confirmed his relationship with singer Skye Morales, which ended in 2023 after Redd issued a public apology admitting infidelity in an Instagram post.

Redd briefly dated rapper Coi Leray in 2019. They rekindled their relationship in August 2024. On January 1, 2025, it was announced that they were expecting their first child. On June 17, 2025, their daughter Miyoco was born.

== Legal issues ==
Redd was arrested in Cobb County, Georgia, following an assault on rapper FDM Grady in late May 2018. According to Grady, Redd and rapper Lil Wop insulted Grady's girlfriend, leading Grady to draw a firearm briefly before engaging in a fist fight with Redd. At that point, Grady was attacked by four men including Redd and Wop. Redd was arrested on charges of affray (public fighting), criminal trespass and simple battery. A few weeks later in early June, Redd was again arrested in Georgia on an assault charge for allegedly pistol-whipping a woman.

On Thursday, August 29, 2023, Redd and another young male were pulled over in Florida for driving with illegally tinted windows. During questioning, police learned that neither Redd or the other man in the vehicle had a valid drivers' license. Redd received a citation, while the man accompanying Redd was arrested for cannabis possession.

On July 4, 2025, Redd was arrested at Miami International Airport while attempting to board a flight to France. He was arrested due to an active warrant related to driving without a license.

== Discography ==
=== Studio albums ===
- Life's a Trip (2018)
- ! (2019)
- Pegasus (2020)
- Trip at Knight (2021)
- Mansion Musik (2023)
- NDA (2026)
- #NDA (2026)

== Filmography ==
Year	Title	Role	Notes
2020	Dave	Himself	Season 1: episodes 4 and 7; credited as Trippie Redd
2020	The Eric Andre Show	Himself	Season 5: episode 7
2021	Downfalls High	Himself	
2022	Good Mourning	Pool guest	
2022	Saints Row	Himself	

=== As director ===
==== Music videos ====
Year	Title	Release date	Artist(s)
2024	Both Ways	October 14, 2024	Juice Wrld
