= Russ discography =

The discography of Russ, who is an American rapper and record producer.

== Studio albums ==
List of albums, with selected chart positions and certifications
Title	Album details	Peak chart positions						Certifications
Title	Album details	US	US R&B/HH	US Rap	AUS	CAN	NZ	Certifications
Velvet	Released: December 9, 2011; Label: Diemon; Format: Digital download	—	—	—	—	—	—	
Apollo 13	Released: January 24, 2012; Label: Diemon; Format: Digital download	—	—	—	—	—	—	
5280	Released: July 23, 2012; Label: Diemon; Format: Digital download	—	—	—	—	—	—	
Vacation	Released: September 24, 2012; Label: Diemon; Format: Digital download	—	—	—	—	—	—	
Straight From Limbo	Released: January 1, 2013; Label: Diemon; Format: Digital download	—	—	—	—	—	—	
The Edge	Released: June 12, 2013; Label: Diemon; Format: Digital download	—	—	—	—	—	—	
Color Blind	Released: September 2, 2013; Label: Diemon; Format: Digital download	—	—	—	—	—	—	
Pink Elephant	Released: January 23, 2014; Label: Diemon; Format: Digital download	—	—	—	—	—	—	
Brain Dead	Released: March 24, 2014; Label: Diemon; Format: Digital download	—	—	—	—	—	—	
Silence	Released: June 11, 2014; Label: Diemon; Format: Digital download	—	—	—	—	—	—	
How to Rob	Released: August 18, 2014; Label: Diemon; Format: Digital download	—	—	—	—	—	—	
There's Really a Wolf	Released: May 5, 2017; Label: Diemon, Columbia; Format: CD, digital download	7	4	4	54	9	29	RIAA: 2× Platinum; MC: Platinum
Zoo	Released: September 7, 2018; Label: Diemon, Columbia; Format: CD, digital download	4	2	2	43	12	35	RIAA: Gold
Shake the Snow Globe	Released: January 31, 2020; Label: Diemon, Columbia; Format: CD, digital download	4	4	4	44	21	29	RIAA: Gold
Chomp 2	Released: December 8, 2021; Label: Russ My Way; Format: Digital download, streaming	—	—	—	—	—	—	
Santiago	Released: August 18, 2023; Label: Diemon; Format: CD, LP, Digital download, streaming	12	3	3	58	24	24	
W!ld	Released: June 27, 2025; Label: Diemon; Format: Digital download, streaming	10	3	2	—	—	—	

== Extended plays ==
List of extended plays with selected details
Title	Details
Just in Case	Released: December 23, 2018; Label: Russ My Way; Format: Digital download, streaming
Chomp	Released: November 17, 2020; Label: Russ My Way; Format: Digital download, streaming
If Not Now, When?	Released: April 26, 2022; Label: Diemon; Format: Digital download, streaming

== Singles ==
=== As lead artist ===
List of singles as lead artist, with selected chart positions
Title	Year	Peak chart positions										Certifications	Album
Title	Year	US	US R&B/HH	US Rap	US R&B	US Rhy.	BEL (Fl) Tip	BEL (FL) Urban	CAN	NZ	NZ Hot	Certifications	Album
"Goodbye"	2014	—	—	—	—	—	—	—	—	—	—	RIAA: Gold; MC: Gold; RMNZ: Gold	Pink Elephant
"Psycho"	2014	—	—	—	—	—	—	—	—	—	—		Pink Elephant
"Willy Wonka" (featuring Paulina and Jafé)	2015	—	—	—	—	—	—	—	—	—	—		Non-album singles
"Too Many"	2015	—	—	—	—	—	—	—	—	—	—	RIAA: Gold	Non-album singles
"Pull the Trigger"	2015	—	—	—	—	—	—	—	—	—	—	RIAA: Platinum; MC: Platinum; RMNZ: Platinum	There's Really a Wolf
"What They Want"	2015	83	33	21	—	12	—	50	70	—	—	RIAA: 5× Platinum; ARIA: Platinum; BPI: Silver; MC: 3× Platinum; RMNZ: 3× Platinum	There's Really a Wolf
"Someone to Drink With"	2015	—	—	—	—	—	—	—	—	—	—		Non-album single
"Losin Control"	2015	62	28	—	7	8	—	—	—	—	—	RIAA: 8× Platinum; ARIA: Platinum; BPI: Silver; MC: 2× Platinum; RMNZ: 2× Platinum	There's Really a Wolf
"Do It Myself"	2015	—	—	—	—	—	—	—	—	—	—	RIAA: Platinum; MC: Gold; RMNZ: Gold	There's Really a Wolf
"Inbetween"	2016	—	—	—	—	—	—	—	—	—	—		Non-album singles
"Yung God"	2016	—	—	—	—	—	—	43	—	—	—	RIAA: Gold; RMNZ: Gold	Non-album singles
"Waste My Time"	2016	—	—	—	—	—	—	—	—	—	—		Non-album singles
"Exposed"	2016	—	—	—	—	—	—	—	—	—	—		Non-album singles
"We Just Haven't Met Yet"	2016	—	—	—	—	—	—	—	—	—	—		Non-album singles
"Gone"	2016	—	—	—	—	—	—	—	—	—	—		Non-album singles
"Look"	2016	—	—	—	—	—	—	—	—	—	—		Non-album singles
"Overdue"	2016	—	—	—	—	—	—	—	—	—	—		Non-album singles
"For the Stunt"	2016	—	—	—	—	—	—	—	—	—	—		Non-album singles
"Psycho, Pt. 2"	2016	—	—	—	—	—	—	—	—	—	—	RIAA: Platinum; RMNZ: Platinum	Non-album singles
"Fallin' Too"	2016	—	—	—	—	—	—	—	—	—	—		Non-album singles
"Ain't Nobody Takin My Baby"	2016	—	—	—	—	—	—	—	—	—	—	RIAA: Platinum; RMNZ: Platinum	Non-album singles
"Sideline Number"	2017	—	—	—	—	—	—	—	—	—	—		Non-album singles
"The Journey"	2017	—	—	—	—	—	—	—	—	—	—		Non-album singles
"Me You"	2017	—	—	—	—	30	16	20	—	—	—	RIAA: Platinum; MC: Platinum; RMNZ: Gold	There's Really a Wolf
"Wife You Up"	2017	—	—	—	16	16	—	—	—	—	—	RIAA: Gold	Non-album singles
"Maybe"	2017	—	—	—	—	—	—	—	—	—	—		Non-album singles
"Flip"	2018	—	—	—	—	—	—	—	—	—	—		Non-album singles
"Some Time"	2018	—	—	—	12	—	—	—	—	—	—	RIAA: Gold; MC: Gold	Non-album singles
"Basement" (featuring Jessie Reyez)	2018	—	—	—	23	—	—	—	—	—	—		Non-album singles
"Back to Life"	2018	—	—	—	—	30	—	39	—	—	—		Non-album singles
"The Flute Song"	2018	— (Note: "The Flute Song" did not enter the Billboard Hot 100, but peaked at number 15 on the Bubbling Under Hot 100 chart.)	— (Note: "The Flute Song" did not enter the Billboard Hot R&B/Hip-Hop Songs chart, but peaked at number five on the Bubbling Under R&B/Hip-Hop Singles chart.)	—	—	30	47	31	90	—	—	RIAA: Gold; MC: Gold	Zoo
"Missin You Crazy"	2018	— (Note: "Missin You Crazy" did not enter the Billboard Hot 100, but peaked at number 22 on the Bubbling Under Hot 100 chart.)	— (Note: "Missin You Crazy" did not enter the Billboard Hot R&B/Hip-Hop Songs chart, but peaked at number six on the Bubbling Under R&B/Hip-Hop Singles chart.)	—	—	16	—	—	—	—	21	RIAA: 2× Platinum; MC: Platinum; RMNZ: Platinum	Zoo
"Nobody Knows"	2018	—	—	—	—	—	—	—	—	—	35		Just In Case
"Aint Goin Back"	2019	—	—	—	—	—	—	—	—	—	24		Non-album singles
"All I Want" (featuring DaVido)	2019	—	—	—	—	—	—	—	—	—	—		Non-album singles
"Civil War"	2019	—	—	—	—	33	—	—	92	—	12	RIAA: Platinum; MC: Platinum; RMNZ: Platinum	Shake the Snow Globe
"Paranoid"	2019	—	—	—	—	—	—	—	—	—	32		Shake the Snow Globe
"Summer at 7"	2019	—	—	—	—	—	—	—	—	—	—		Shake the Snow Globe
"Rent Free"	2019	—	—	—	—	—	—	—	—	—	24		Non-album single
"Best on Earth" (featuring Bia)	2019	46	22	14	—	1	—	—	—	—	4	RIAA: 3× Platinum; MC: Gold; RMNZ: Platinum	Shake the Snow Globe
"Give Up"	2020	—	—	—	—	—	—	—	—	—	—		Non-album singles
"Throne Talks"	2020	—	—	—	—	—	—	—	—	—	29		Non-album singles
"Take You Back" (with Kehlani)	2020	—	—	—	8	38	—	—	—	—	10		Non-album singles
"Paid Off"	2020	—	—	—	—	—	—	—	—	—	25		Non-album singles
"Sorry"	2020	—	—	—	—	—	—	—	—	—	—		Non-album singles
"I Love Me"	2020	—	—	—	—	—	—	—	—	—	—		Non-album singles
"Ugly" (featuring Lil Baby)	2021	— (Note: "Ugly" did not enter the Billboard Hot 100, but peaked at number 18 on the Bubbling Under Hot 100 chart.)	49	—	—	—	—	—	—	—	24		Non-album singles
"Misunderstood"	2021	—	—	—	—	—	—	—	—	—	40		Non-album singles
"Bankrupt"	2021	—	—	—	—	—	—	—	—	—	36		Non-album singles
"Small Talk"	2021	—	—	—	—	—	—	—	—	—	16		Non-album singles
"Status"	2021	—	—	—	—	—	—	—	—	—	28		Non-album singles
"3:15 (Breathe)"	2021	—	—	—	—	—	—	—	—	—	11	RIAA: Platinum; RMNZ: 2× Platinum	Non-album singles
"Private" (featuring Rexx Life Raj)	2021	—	—	—	—	—	—	—	—	—	21		Non-album singles
"Money on Me"	2021	—	—	—	—	—	—	—	—	—	30		Non-album singles
"Rather Be Myself"	2021	—	—	—	—	—	—	—	—	—	29		Non-album singles
"Satisfy"	2021	—	—	—	—	—	—	—	—	—	27		Non-album singles
"On the Way"	2021	—	—	—	—	—	—	—	—	—	26		Non-album singles
"Nothin I Won't Do"	2021	—	—	—	—	—	—	—	—	—	25		Non-album singles
"Fate"	2021	—	—	—	—	—	—	—	—	—	33		Non-album singles
"When I'm with You"	2021	—	—	—	—	—	—	—	—	—	37		Non-album singles
"Can't Let Go"	2021	—	—	—	—	—	—	—	—	—	20		Non-album singles
"When This Was All New"	2021	—	—	—	—	—	—	—	—	—	40		Non-album singles
"Seduce" (featuring Capella Grey)	2021	— (Note: "Seduce" did not enter the Billboard Hot 100, but peaked at number 20 on the Bubbling Under Hot 100 chart.)	—	—	10	—	—	—	79	18	2	RIAA: Gold; RMNZ: Platinum	Non-album singles
"Losin Control, Pt. 2"	2021	—	—	—	—	—	—	—	—	—	29		Non-album singles
"Remember" (solo or featuring Hailey Knox)	2022	—	—	—	—	—	—	—	—	—	25 (Note: The original version of "Remember" reached number 25 on the NZ Hot Singles Chart. The remix featuring Hailey Knox also reached number 34 separately.)		Non-album singles
"Handsomer" (solo or featuring Ktlyn)	2022	40	14	—	—	39	—	—	20	30	3 (Note: The remix of "Handsomer" featuring Ktlyn reached number 3 on the NZ Hot Singles Chart. The original version also reached number 9 separately, and the extended remix reached number 13.)	RIAA: Platinum; RMNZ: Gold	Non-album singles
"Real"	2022	—	—	—	—	—	—	—	—	—	15		Non-album singles
"Are You Entertained" (with Ed Sheeran)	2022	97	26	25	—	33	—	—	41	20	2		Non-album singles
"Last Night"	2022	—	—	—	—	—	—	—	—	—	25		Non-album singles
"Too Much"	2022	—	—	—	—	—	—	—	—	—	30		Non-album singles
"Home"	2022	—	—	—	—	—	—	—	—	—	20		Non-album singles
"Put You on Game"	2023	—	—	—	—	—	—	—	—	—	10		Non-album singles
"Can't Get This Right"	2023	—	—	—	—	—	—	—	—	—	15		Non-album singles
"Nasty"	2023	75	22	14	—	38	—	—	54	39	5	RIAA: Gold; RMNZ: Gold	Non-album singles
"Fire"	2023	—	—	—	—	—	—	—	—	—	36		Non-album singles
"Said It Freestyle"	2023	—	—	—	—	—	—	—	—	—	21		Non-album singles
"In the Dirt"	2024	—	—	—	—	—	—	—	—	—	18		Non-album singles
"Work This Out" (with DJ Premier)	2024	—	—	—	—	—	—	—	—	—	38		Non-album singles
"I Got You"	2024	—	—	—	—	—	—	—	—	—	31		Non-album singles
"That's My Girl"	2024	— (Note: "That's My Girl" did not enter the Billboard Hot 100, but peaked at number eight on the Bubbling Under Hot 100 chart.)	37	—	—	—	—	—	—	—	11		Non-album singles
"Workin on Me" (with 6lack)	2024	—	—	—	—	—	—	—	—	—	8		Non-album singles
"Win"	2024	—	—	—	—	—	—	—	—	—	23		Non-album singles
"Break!"	2024	—	—	—	—	—	—	—	—	—	27		Non-album singles
"If This Is It"	2024	—	—	—	—	—	—	—	—	—	20		Non-album singles
"Get Up and Get It"	2024	—	—	—	—	—	—	—	—	—	28		Non-album singles
"April 7"	2025	—	—	—	—	—	—	—	—	—	27		W!ld
"Pent Up in a Penthouse"	2025	—	—	—	—	—	—	—	—	—	35		W!ld
"Crazy"	2025	—	—	—	—	—	—	—	—	—	36		W!ld
"Recognize" (with Jessy Blakemore)	2025	—	—	—	—	—	—	—	—	—	9		Non-album singles
"Clue"	2025	—	—	—	—	—	—	—	—	—	35		Non-album singles
"Hell"	2026	—	—	—	—	—	—	—	—	—	37		Non-album singles
"Coulda Shoulda Woulda"	2026	—	—	—	—	—	—	—	—	—	24		Non-album singles
"Come Back to Me"	2026	—	—	—	—	34	—	—	—	—	12		Non-album singles
"—" denotes a recording that did not chart.

=== As featured artist ===
List of singles as featured artist
Title	Year	Peak chart positions	Album
Title	Year	NZ Hot	Album
"Perico" (Dakota featuring Russ)	2016	—	Non-album single
"Issues" (PnB Rock featuring Russ)	2017	—	Catch These Vibes
"Lil Arrogant" (IDK featuring Joey Bada$$ and Russ)	2018	—	Non-album singles
"Bank" (Collie Buddz featuring B Young and Russ)	2019	—	Non-album singles
"The Way" (Trippie Redd featuring Russ)	2020	25	A Love Letter to You 4
"Without You" (Queen Naija featuring Russ)	2020	—	Misunderstood
"Own My Masters" (jackboy featuring Russ)	2020		Non-album single
"Fck Boys" (Blxst featuring Russ)	2021	12	Just for Clarity
"Because" (Black Thought, Danger Mouse, Joey Badass, Dylan Cartridge)	2022		Cheat Codes
"Therapy Music" (Logic featuring Russ)	2022	20	Vinyl Days
"Bornfire" (Gunehgar featuring Russ)	2022		Divine
"Work of Art" (Will Smith featuring Russ)	2024		TBD
"Hello Habibi" (Olamide featuring Russ)	2024		TBD
"—" denotes a recording that did not chart.

=== Promotional singles ===
List of promotional singles
Title	Year	Peak chart positions		Certifications	Album
Title	Year	US R&B	NZ Hot	Certifications	Album
"KiKi"	2014	—	—		Non-album singles
"The King"	2014	—	—		Non-album singles
"Boomerang"	2014	—	—		Non-album singles
"No Matter What"	2014	—	—		Non-album singles
"February"	2015	—	—		Non-album singles
"Got It Good"	2015	—	—		Non-album singles
"Hoe Love"	2015	—	—		Non-album singles
"My Baby"	2015	—	—		Non-album singles
"Out of Tune"	2015	—	—		Non-album singles
"Lonely In Time Square"	2015	—	—		Non-album singles
"Shootin Up" (featuring Bugus)	2015	—	—		Non-album singles
"Brand New"	2015	—	—		Non-album singles
"99" (featuring Paulina and TOTEM)	2015	—	—		Non-album singles
"If I Died"	2015	—	—		Non-album singles
"Reminder"	2015	—	—		Non-album singles
"Single Parent Anthem"	2015	—	—		Non-album singles
"Brooklyn Freestyle"	2015	—	—		Non-album singles
"Your Favorite Rapper"	2015	—	—		Non-album singles
"Piranha Freestyle"	2015	—	—		Non-album singles
"Bugatti Stranger"	2015	—	—		Non-album singles
"Lapped"	2015	—	—		Non-album singles
"Dr. Seuss"	2015	—	—		Non-album singles
"Keep It Moving" (featuring John Anthony)	2015	—	—		Non-album singles
"Like That"	2015	—	—		Non-album singles
"Straight from Saudi"	2015	—	—		Non-album singles
"Juice & Sauce"	2015	—	—		Non-album singles
"First One"	2015	—	—		Non-album singles
"Here I Am"	2015	—	—		Non-album singles
"Always Knew"	2015	—	—		Non-album singles
"Titanic"	2015	—	—		Non-album singles
"The Formula"	2015	—	—		Non-album singles
"Down for You"	2015	—	—		Non-album singles
"Try It"	2016	—	—		Non-album singles
"Moonlight in Atlanta"	2016	—	—		Non-album singles
"The Otherside"	2016	—	—		Non-album singles
"Confidence"	2016	—	—		Non-album singles
"Lost"	2016	—	—		Non-album singles
"Manifest"	2016	—	—		Non-album singles
"Tsunami"	2016	—	—		Non-album singles
"Let Me In"	2016	—	—		Non-album singles
"T'd Up"	2016	—	—		Non-album singles
"DiMaggio"	2016	—	—		Non-album singles
"Unavailable"	2016	—	—		Non-album singles
"Whenever"	2016	—	—		Non-album singles
"Off the Strength"	2016	—	—		Non-album singles
"Exposed"	2016	—	—		Non-album singles
"10 Year Freestyle"	2016	—	—		Non-album singles
"Gone"	2016	—	—		Non-album singles
"Look"	2016	—	—		Non-album singles
"Overdue"	2016	—	—		Non-album singles
"For the Stunt"	2016	—	—		Non-album singles
"Fallin' Too"	2016	—	—		Non-album singles
"Sideline Number"	2017	—	—		Non-album singles
"The Best Party"	2017	—	—		Non-album singles
"Used to You"	2017	—	—		Non-album singles
"Take It All in" (featuring Rexx Life Raj)	2017	—	—		Non-album singles
"Keep on Goin" (featuring Bas)	2017	—	—		Non-album singles
"Cherry Hill"	2017	19	—	RIAA: 2× Platinum; MC: Gold; RMNZ: Gold	There's Really a Wolf
"The Game"	2017	—	—		Non-album singles
"Think Twice"	2017	—	—		Non-album singles
"Prosper"	2017	—	—		Non-album singles
"Lean On You"	2017	—	—		Non-album singles
"Alone"	2018	—	—		Non-album singles
"Since I Was Broke"	2018	—	—		Non-album singles
"Sore Losers"	2018	—	—		Non-album singles
"Dangerous"	2018	—	—		Non-album singles
"Don't Fall For It"	2018	—	—		Non-album singles
"September 16"	2018	—	—	RIAA: Gold	Non-album singles
"Tell Me Why"	2018	—	—		Non-album singles
"Serious"	2018	—	—		Zoo
"Crown"	2019	—	—		Non-album singles
"ON 10" (featuring Rexx Life Raj)	2019	—	—		Non-album singles
"Old Days"	2019	—	—		Non-album singles
"Grammy Bag Freestyle"	2019	—	—		Non-album singles
"Nighttime (Interlude)"	2019	—	34		Shake the Snow Globe
"Live From The Villa"	2020	—	—		Non-album single
"Can't Be Me"	2020	—	—		Non-album single
"Still"	2020	—	—		Non-album single
"One More Chance" (featuring Fans)	2020	—	—		Non-album single
"Why"	2020	—	—		Non-album single
"Aw Aw"	2020	—	—		Non-album single
"Freed Up"	2020	—	—		Non-album single
"—" denotes a recording that did not chart.

== Other charted and certified songs ==
Title	Year	Peak chart positions		Certifications	Album
Title	Year	US R&B	NZ Hot	Certifications	Album
"Ride Slow"	2017	—	—	RIAA: 2× Platinum; MC: Gold; RMNZ: Gold	There's Really a Wolf
"Need a Minute"	2020	—	29		Shake the Snow Globe
"Guess What" (featuring Rick Ross)	2020	—	16		Shake the Snow Globe
"All to You" (featuring Kiana Ledé)	2020	—	38		Shake the Snow Globe
"3AM" (featuring Ty Dolla $ign)	2020	15	20		Shake the Snow Globe
"Wicked Race"	2023	—	40		Chomp 2.5
"Perfectionist"	2023	—	31		Chomp 2.5
"See You Soon"	2023	—	37		Santiago
"No More"	2023	—	25		Santiago
"I Love You Boy"	2023	41	11		Santiago
"—" denotes a recording that did not chart.

== Guest appearances ==
Album	Song	Year	Artist
Pain 2	Fallin'	2018	Derez de'Shon
Bugus	I Refuse	2019	Bugus
I Wanna Thank Me	Take Me Away	2019	Snoop Dogg, Wiz Khalifa
1UP	Here It Comes	2019	T-Pain
The Golden Child	Mind Games	2019	YK Osiris
Father Figure 3: Somewhere Out There	Falling	2019	Rexx Life Raj
Asin9ne	No See Umz	2021	Tech N9ne, Snow tha Product
Mr Money with the Vibe	Reason	2022	Asake
Pillow Talk	News	2022	Tink
The Blue Hour	Settled	2022	Rexx Life Raj
Les autres c'est nous	Trust Myself	2022	Bigflo & Oli
December	No No	2022	Papoose
Herbert	Go Off	2022	Ab-Soul, Big Sean
Round Trip	Limbo	2023	Statik Selektah
Vibe Till Thy Kingdom Come	Gangsta (Remix)	2023	Seyi Vibez, Jibrille
In Between	Wolves	2023	Lauren Jauregui, Ty $
Beautifully Broken (Pickin' Up the Pieces)	Really Gone	2024	Jelly Roll
