= 2022 BET Hip Hop Awards =

Annual edition of the awards show

- Date: October 4, 2022
- Location: Cobb Energy Performing Arts Centre, Atlanta, Georgia
- Hosted by: Fat Joe
- Most wins: Kendrick Lamar (6)
- Most nominations: Drake (14)

The 2022 BET Hip Hop Awards was a recognition ceremony that was held on October 4, 2022, as the 17th installment of the BET Hip Hop Awards. The nominations were announced on September 12, 2022. The awards were hosted by Fat Joe.

Kendrick Lamar won the most awards at the ceremony, with six. Drake had the most nominations with 14, followed by Kanye West with 10 and Lamar with nine. Trina received the I Am Hip Hop Award.

== Nominees ==
=== Hip Hop Artist of the Year ===
- Kendrick Lamar
  - Cardi B
  - Doja Cat
  - Drake
  - Future
  - Kanye West
  - Megan Thee Stallion

=== Hip Hop Album of the Year ===
- Kendrick Lamar – Mr. Morale & the Big Steppers
- Latto - 777
- Drake – Certified Lover Boy
- Kanye West – Donda
- Future – I Never Liked You
- Pusha T – It's Almost Dry
- Nas – King's Disease II

=== Best Hip Hop Video ===
- Baby Keem & Kendrick Lamar – "Family Ties"
- ASAP Rocky – "D.M.B."
- City Girls featuring Usher – "Good Love"
- Cardi B, Kanye West & Lil Durk – "Hot Shit"
- Bia & J. Cole – "London"
- Future featuring Drake & Tems – "Wait for U"
- Drake featuring Future & Young Thug – "Way 2 Sexy"

=== Best Collaboration ===
- Future featuring Drake & Tems – "Wait for U"
- Baby Keem & Kendrick Lamar – "Family Ties"
- City Girls featuring Usher – "Good Love"
- Cardi B, Kanye West & Lil Durk – "Hot Shit"
- Drake featuring 21 Savage – "Jimmy Cooks"
- Benny the Butcher & J. Cole – "Johnny P's Caddy"
- Drake featuring Future & Young Thug – "Way 2 Sexy"

=== Best Duo/Group ===
- EarthGang
- 42 Dugg & EST Gee
- Big Sean & Hit-Boy
- Birdman & YoungBoy Never Broke Again
- Blxst & Bino Rideaux
- DaBaby & YoungBoy Never Broke Again
- Styles P & Havoc

=== Best Live Performer ===
- Kendrick Lamar
- Cardi B
- Doja Cat
- Drake
- J. Cole
- Kanye West
- Tyler, the Creator

=== Lyricist of the Year ===
- Kendrick Lamar
- Baby Keem
- Benny the Butcher
- Drake
- J. Cole
- Jack Harlow
- Jay-Z

=== Video Director of the Year ===
- Kendrick Lamar & Dave Free
- Benny Boom
- Burna Boy
- Cole Bennett
- Colin Tilley
- Director X
- Teyana Taylor

=== DJ of the Year ===
- DJ Drama
- D-Nice
- DJ Cassidy
- DJ Kay Slay
- DJ Premier
- Kaytranada
- Mustard
- Nyla Symone
- LA Leakers: DJ Sourmilk & Justin Incredible

=== Producer of the Year ===
- Hitmaka
- ATL Jacob
- Baby Keem
- Hit-Boy
- Kanye West
- Metro Boomin
- Pharrell Williams

=== Song of the Year ===
- "Big Energy" – Produced by Dr. Luke & Vaughn Oliver (Latto)
- "F.N.F. (Let's Go)" – Produced by Hitkidd (Hitkidd & GloRilla)
- "First Class" – Produced by Rogét Chahayed, Jack Harlow, Jasper Harris, & Charlie Handsome (Jack Harlow)
- "Hot Shit" – Produced by Tay Keith & BanBwoi (Cardi B, Kanye West & Lil Durk)
- "Super Gremlin" – Produced by ATL Jacob & Jambo (Kodak Black)
- "Wait for U" – Produced by FnZ & ATL Jacob (Future featuring Drake & Tems)
- "Way 2 Sexy" – Produced by TM88 & Too Dope (Drake featuring Future & Young Thug)

=== Best Breakthrough Hip Hop Artist ===
- GloRilla
- Baby Keem
- Blxst
- Doechii
- Fivio Foreign
- Nardo Wick
- Saucy Santana

=== Hustler of the Year ===
- 50 Cent
- Cardi B
- DJ Khaled
- Drake
- Jay-Z
- Kanye West
- Megan Thee Stallion

=== Sweet 16: Best Featured Verse ===
- Drake – "Churchill Downs" (Jack Harlow)
- J. Cole – "Poke It Out" (Wale)
- J. Cole – "London" (Bia)
- Lil Baby – "Girls Want Girls" (Drake)
- Kanye West – "City of Gods" (Fivio Foreign & Alicia Keys)
- Drake – "Wait for U" (Future & Tems)
- Jadakiss – "Black Illuminati" (Freddie Gibbs)

=== Impact Track ===
- Lizzo – "About Damn Time"
- Fivio Foreign, Kanye West & Alicia Keys – "City of Gods"
- Baby Keem & Kendrick Lamar – "Family Ties"
- Nas featuring Lauryn Hill – "Nobody"
- Latto – "Pussy"
- Kendrick Lamar – "The Heart Part 5"
- Doja Cat – "Woman"

=== Best Hip-Hop Platform ===
- Caresha Please
- Drink Champs
- Big Boy's Neighborhood
- The Breakfast Club
- Complex
- HipHopDX
- Million Dollaz Worth of Game
- NPR Tiny Desk
- WorldStarHipHop
- Verzuz

=== Best International Flow ===
- Benjamin Epps (France)
- Black Sherif (Ghana)
- BLXCKIE (South Africa)
- Central Cee (UK)
- Haviah Mighty (Canada)
- Knucks (UK)
- Le Juiice (France)
- Nadia Nakai (South Africa)
- Fazari Big Jue SZN (Liberia)
- DMD BIG BABY ( LIBERIA)
- Tasha & Tracie (Brazil)

=== I Am Hip-Hop Award ===
- Trina

== Performers ==
- Kodak Black
- Armani White
- GloRilla
- Fivio foreign
