= For Certain =

EP by Bia
- Released: December 11, 2020
- Genre: Trap
- Length: 21:00
- Label: Epic
- Producers: AzizTheShake; Lil Rich; CB Mix; London Jae; Tee Romano; BeatGodz

Bia chronology
Nice Girls Finish Last: Cuidado (2018)	For Certain (2020)	Really Her (2023)

Singles from For Certain
- 1. "Free Bia (1st Day Out)" Released: March 27, 2020; 2. "Cover Girl" Released: April 3, 2020; 3. "Same Hands" Released: September 25, 2020; 4. "Skate" Released: November 20, 2020; 5. "Whole Lotta Money" Released: May 18, 2021; 6. "Besito" Released: September 24, 2021

For Certain is the second EP by American rapper Bia, which was released on December 11, 2020, through Epic Records. The EP was supported by the singles; "Free Bia (1st Day Out)", "Cover Girl", "Same Hands" featuring Lil Durk, "Skate", and "Whole Lotta Money", which were released throughout 2020 and 2021 respectively. For Certain also features guest appearances from Lil Jon, Doe Boy and 42 Dugg. A deluxe edition was released on October 22, 2021, and was preceded by the singles "Whole Lotta Money (Remix)" featuring Nicki Minaj and "Besito" featuring G Herbo.

== Background and development ==
In 2014, Bia signed a joint record deal with RCA Records and Pharrell's label I Am Other. During this time she released a mixtape titled, #CholaSeason in 2014, as well as the Nice Girls Finish Last: Cuidado EP in 2018. In 2019, Bia would separate from the labels claiming she was prevented from releasing music. After her first independently released single "One Minute Warning" in August 2019, Bia would be featured on the Russ collaboration, "Best on Earth" in October 2019. The song would peak at number 42 on the Billboard Hot 100 and be certified Platinum by the RIAA.

In early 2020, Bia would sign a new record deal with Epic Records and started releasing single throughout the year in anticipation for the EP. Bia initially announced the project's title to be "Rich Tiers", but the title was later changed in favour of "For Certain", its title taken from the hook of the single "Cover Girl". On December 8, Bia took to her social media accounts to announce the project and revealed the cover art. The following day, Bia revealed the tracklisting.

People ask me why I chose to name this EP For Certain. Without getting too preachy this is the first time in my life I'm certain about everything. I move with surety & that's because everything I'm doing is authentic. There's a power that comes from not seeking validation from anyone other than YOU. That's what I feel. I've had wins and even more losses to know that THE SHOW MUST GO ON! Be true to you and those around you, proceed with love and what's for you is for you.

— Bia discussing the EP title.

== Singles ==
Bia released the lead single, "Free Bia (1st Day Out)" on March 27, 2020. The song discusses Bia's experience with her previous record label and how she was "shelved" for multiple years, as well as celebrating her newfound freedom.

The second single, "Cover Girl", was released on April 3, 2020, alongside a "quarantine" music video. The song was serviced to Urban and Rhythmic radios on April 14.

The third and fourth singles, "Same Hands" featuring Lil Durk and "Skate" were released in September and November that same year. The latter later was chosen as the Stanley Cup playoffs theme song following a reworked version of the song titled the "NHL Mix".

A music video for "Whole Lotta Money" was released on April 8, 2021, and impacted Rhythmic radios on May 18, 2021, as the fifth single from the EP. The song peaked at number three on the Bubbling Under Hot 100 chart. A remix with Nicki Minaj was released on July 9, 2021, and debuted at No. 16 on the Billboard Hot 100 chart, becoming Bia's first and highest-charting song as a lead artist. The remix pushed the mixtape to debut at No. 64 on the Billboard 200, becoming Bia's first entry on the chart.

== Music and lyrics ==
According to AllMusic, Bia "expresses moments of everyday glamor" such as putting on jewelry "just to go to the bodega." She also "projects a calm, cool-headed attitude which counters her hard, aggressive lyrics" throughout the EP.

In "Bia Bia", she "launches into razor sharp verses before Lil Jon crunks up the hook with his instantly recognizable delivery." In "Skate", she delivers "clever" lyrics about making money and leveling up on a "wavy" trap beat. "Same Hands" was inspired by the idea that "no matter how you sin, you can still be close to God." In "Cover Girl", Bia shows her confidence on a "magnetic" beat.

In "Besito", she exposes her accomplishments to inspire girls and women in a "contemporary hip-hop style that reflects how global her music is." "Can't Touch This" is a "surprisingly smooth club anthem" that samples Kelis' "Milkshake" with lyrics inspired by MC Hammer's "Can't Touch This". "Motionless" is an emotional "diary kind of a song."

== Critical reception ==
Professional ratings
Review scores
Source	Rating
AllMusic	3/5 stars

Richardine Bartee of Grungecake wrote that "if there’s anything Bia understands, it is how to pick the right production and write a hook." Quincy of Ratings Game Music wrote that "while I do not think that BIA puts up dynamic performances on the EP, I do think that she shows flashes of solidness rapping-wise."

== Awards and nominations ==
Award	Year	Category	Result	Ref.
Boston Music Awards	2021	Album of the Year (1 million+ streams)	Won	

== Track listing ==
For Certain track listing
No.	Title	Writer(s)	Producer(s)	Length
1.	"Bia Bia" (featuring Lil Jon)	Bianca Landrau; Abdul Aziz Dieng; Jonathan Smith; Enoch Harris III	AzizTheShake; Lil Rich	2:05
2.	"Skate"	Bianca Landrau; Chris Barnett	CB Mix	2:43
3.	"Whole Lotta Money"	Bianca Landrau	London Jae; Tee Romano; BeatGodz	2:36
4.	"Same Hands" (featuring Lil Durk)	Bianca Landrau; Barnett; Durk Banks	CB Mix	3:26
5.	"Automatic" (featuring Doe Boy and 42 Dugg)	Bianca Landrau; Abdul Aziz Dieng; Isam Mostafa; Dion Marquise Hayes	AzizTheShake	3:09
6.	"Plate"	Bianca Landrau; Anthony Moses Davis; Abdul Aziz Dieng	AzizTheShake	2:37
7.	"Cover Girl"	Bianca Landrau; Abdul Aziz Dieng; Enoch Harris III	AzizTheShake; Lil Rich	2:29
8.	"Free Bia (1st Day Out)"	Bianca Landrau; Enoch Harris III	Lil Rich	1:55
Total length:				21:00

For Certain deluxe tracks
No.	Title	Writer(s)	Producer(s)	Length
9.	"Whole Lotta Money (Remix)" (featuring Nicki Minaj)	Bianca Landrau; Onika Maraj; London Jae; Rodrick Doss Jr.; Tee Romano	London Jae; Tee Romano; BeatGodz	3:49
10.	"Besito" (featuring G Herbo)	Bianca Landrau; Herbert Wright III; Feliciano Ponce Ecar; Harissis Tsakmaklis; Terrence Williams; Luzian Gregor Tuetsch; Jorge Miguel Cardoso Augusto	Tee Romano; Bass Charity	2:11
11.	"Can't Touch This"	Bianca Landrau; Broderick Omar Hughey; Chad Hugo; Jauquez Lowe; Pharrell Williams; Roderick Lamar Hughey Jr.	DJ Pharoah; IROCC; London Jae	2:26
12.	"Big Deal" (featuring Sevyn Streeter)	Bianca Landrau; Abdul Aziz Dieng; Enoch Harris III; Travis "ViKO" Blake	AzizTheShake; Lil Rich	2:33
13.	"Freak In The Night"	Bianca Landrau; Enoch Harris III	Lil Rich	2:40
14.	"Motionless"	Bianca Landrau; Abdul Aziz Dieng; Enoch Harris III	AzizTheShake; Lil Rich	2:27

=== Notes ===
- All track titles are stylized in all uppercase

== Charts ==
Chart performance for For Certain
Chart (2021)	Peak position
US Billboard 200	64
US Top R&B/Hip-Hop Albums (Billboard)	39

== Release history ==
Release history for For Certain
Region	Date	Format	Version	Label	Ref.
Various	December 11, 2020	Digital download; streaming	Standard	Epic	
Various	October 22, 2021	CD; digital download; streaming	Deluxe	Epic	
