= What They Want =

What They Want may refer to:

- "What They Want" (Schoolboy Q song), a 2014 song by Schoolboy Q.
- "What They Want" (Russ song), a 2016 song by Russ.
