= The Plugs I Met =

EP by Benny the Butcher
- Released: June 21, 2019
- Genres: Hip-hop; mafioso rap
- Length: 24:28
- Labels: Black Soprano Family; Griselda
- Producers: The Alchemist; Beat Butcha; Daringer; DJ Shay

Benny the Butcher chronology
| Tana Talk 3 (2018) | The Plugs I Met (2019) | Statute of Limitations (2019) |

Singles from The Plugs I Met
- 1. "18 Wheeler" Released: June 13, 2021

The Plugs I Met is the fourth extended play by American rapper Benny the Butcher. It was released on June 21, 2019, by Black Soprano Family and Griselda Records. Produced by The Alchemist, Beat Butcha, Daringer, and DJ Shay, the EP features guest appearances from Black Thought, 38 Spesh, Jadakiss, RJ Payne, Conway the Machine, Pusha T and India (stylized as INDIA). The EP peaked at number 22 on the Independent Albums chart.

A sequel EP with Harry Fraud, The Plugs I Met 2, was released in 2021.

== Background ==
The EP was announced along with the release of its lead single, "18 Wheeler", featuring Pusha T, on June 13, 2019.

The cover art is an edited still taken from the 1983 film Scarface, with censor bars covering the actors' eyes.

== Critical reception ==
Professional ratings
Review scores
| Source | Rating |
|---|---|
| HipHopDX | 4.5/5 |
| The Needle Drop | 6/10 |
| RapReviews | 8.5/10 |
| Underground Hip Hop Blog | 9/10 |

The Plugs I Met was met with highly positive reviews from music critics. Grant Jones of RapReviews praised the EP, calling it "a jolt in the arm to anybody that gave up on mafioso rap." Riley Wallace of HipHopDX wrote: "a concise (at seven-songs), yet meticulously crafted work of art that not only manages to further illustrate what a problem he is with the bars but—for longtime fans—delivers a guest list you’d expect for an artist affiliated with Shady." Andrew Sacher of BrooklynVegan included the EP in his "30 Best Rap and R&B Albums of 2019" list, stating that "Benny's formula never really changes—vicious, dead-eyed raps delivered over eerie, lurching beats (provided on Plugs by Alchemist, in-house Griselda producer Daringer, and DJ Shay)—but his quality level is remarkably consistent and Plugs may be the most convincing case for Benny's vitality yet."

=== Year-end lists ===
Select year-end rankings of The Plugs I Met
| Publication | List | Rank | Ref. |
|---|---|---|---|
| Ambrosia For Heads | Top 15 Hip-Hop Albums of 2019 | —N/a | |
| BrooklynVegan | 30 Best Rap and R&B Albums of 2019 | 15 | |
| Complex | The Best Albums of 2019 | 16 | |
| HipHopDX | The Best Rap & Hip Hop Albums of 2019 | 14 | |
| Throw Up Magazine | Top 25: Best Hip Hop Albums of 2019 | 3 | |
| XXL | 50 of the Best Hip-Hop Projects of 2019 | —N/a | |

== Track listing ==
The Plugs I Met track listing
| No. | Title | Producer(s) | Length |
|---|---|---|---|
| 1. | "Intro Skit" | | 0:26 |
| 2. | "Crowns for Kings" (featuring Black Thought) | DJ Shay | 4:28 |
| 3. | "Sunday School" (featuring 38 Spesh and Jadakiss) | Daringer | 5:54 |
| 4. | "Dirty Harry" (featuring RJ Payne and Conway the Machine) | Beat Butcha; Daringer | 3:47 |
| 5. | "Took the Money to the Plug's House" | The Alchemist | 3:20 |
| 6. | "18 Wheeler" (featuring Pusha T) | DJ Shay | 2:41 |
| 7. | "5 to 50" (featuring India) | The Alchemist | 3:52 |
| Total length: | | | 24:28 |

== Charts ==
Chart performance for The Plugs I Met
| Chart (2019) | Peak position |
|---|---|
| US Heatseekers Albums (Billboard) | 7 |
| US Independent Albums (Billboard) | 22 |
| US Top Album Sales (Billboard) | 100 |
