= Goodbye (Russ song) =

2014 single by Russ

Single by Russ

from the album Pink Elephant
- Released: January 23, 2014
- Length: 4:12
- Label: Diemon
- Songwriter: Russell Vitale
- Producer: Russ

Russ singles chronology
"Goodbye" (2014)	"Psycho" (2014)

Music video
- "Goodbye" on YouTube

"Goodbye" is the debut single by American rapper Russ, released on January 23, 2014, as the lead single from his eighth studio album Pink Elephant (2014). Produced by Russ himself, it contains a sample of Esther Phillips' cover of "I Wish You Love".

== Background ==
In an interview with Forbes in April 2018, Russ spoke about the success of the song:

I remember putting my song "Goodbye" in 2014 and seeing it hit 1,000 plays in a week. To me, at that time, it was a crazy accomplishment. That was a win I celebrated. I remember putting out my first video ever and it getting 7,000 views in a week, which was nuts. When I got those small wins, I genuinely felt very accomplished. That's what the universe rewards — gratitude.

Russ has revealed the woman in question in the song is the same person he talks about in his songs "I Think My Girl Caught a Body" and "Ain't Nobody Takin My Baby".

== Content ==
The song is about a failed romantic relationship in Russ' life, and the bitterness of his heartbreak.

== Critical reception ==
Dharmic X of The Source described the song as one that "showcases Russ's excellent artistry", before adding "Going back and forth between his lyrical flow and stretching his vocals Russ provides music filled with passion and emotion."

== Music video ==
The music video was released in February 2014. It shows Russ in a hotel room, where he is seen pacing and peering out his window at nighttime, as well as periodic scenes of a car following close behind another car as they drive across the city.

== Certifications ==
Region	Certification	Certified units/sales
Canada (Music Canada)	Gold	40,000^{‡}
New Zealand (RMNZ)	Gold	15,000^{‡}
United States (RIAA)	Gold	500,000^{‡}
^{‡} Sales+streaming figures based on certification alone.
