= Tana Talk 3 =

Studio album by Benny the Butcher
- Released: November 23, 2018
- Recorded: 2017–2018
- Genres: Hip-hop; East Coast hip-hop
- Length: 52:09
- Labels: Griselda; Black Soprano Family
- Producers: Daringer; The Alchemist

Benny the Butcher chronology
Stabbed & Shot (2018)	Tana Talk 3 (2018)	The Plugs I Met (2019)

Singles from Tana Talk 3
- 1. "Rick (SoundCloud release)" Released: March 20, 2017; 2. "Joe Pesci 38" Released: November 13, 2018; 3. "Broken Bottles" Released: November 26, 2018

Tana Talk 3 is the debut studio album by American rapper Benny the Butcher. It was released on November 23, 2018 through Griselda Records and Black Soprano Family. The album is exclusively produced by The Alchemist and Daringer. It features guest appearances by labelmates Conway the Machine and Westside Gunn and other appearances by Keisha Plum, Meyhem Lauren, Melanie Rutherford and Royce da 5'9".

== Background ==
The name of the album is a reference to Montana Avenue in Buffalo, New York. The cover is a baby painting of his deceased older brother, Machine Gun Black.

== Singles ==
On March 20, 2017, Benny the Butcher released “Rick” on SoundCloud giving it the lead single title. On November 13, 2018, Benny the Butcher released the official lead single "Joe Pesci 38" ten days before the release of the album. The second single of the album, "Broken Bottles", was released on November 26, 2018.

== Critical reception ==
Professional ratings
Review scores
Source	Rating
HipHopDX	4.4/5
RapReviews	8.5/10

Riley Wallace of HipHopDX gave the album a 4.4 out of 5, saying: "Tana Talk 3 is dark, powerful, and beaming with a certain energy that’s hard to fake. This isn’t a swag rapper looking for clout, a future industry fawn fest, or knockoff Top 40. This is the diary of an MC who marched the frontline and made it out to tell the tale in vivid detail." Sy Shackleford of RapReviews similarly praised the album, calling it "a solid listen."

The album was included on Pitchfork's "Best Rap Albums of 2018" list.

== Track listing ==
Credits adapted from Tidal.

Tana Talk 3 track listing
No.	Title	Writer(s)	Producer(s)	Length
1.	"Intro:Babs" (featuring Keisha Plum)	Jeremie Damon Pennick; Thomas Paldino; Keisha Plum	Daringer	2:28
2.	"Goodnight"	Pennick; Paldino; Trevor Smith Jr.; Roger McNair; Rashad Smith	Daringer	3:21
3.	"Scarface vs Sosa, Pt. 2"	Pennick; Paldino	Daringer	3:46
4.	"Rubber Bands & Weight"	Pennick; Daniel Alan Maman	The Alchemist	3:53
5.	"Fast Eddie"	Pennick; Paldino	Daringer	4:48
6.	"Broken Bottles"	Pennick; Maman	The Alchemist	3:58
7.	"Echo Long" (featuring Meyhem Lauren and Westside Gunn)	Pennick; Paldino; Meyhem Lauren; Alvin Lamar Worthy	Daringer	3:30
8.	"'97 Hov"	Pennick; Maman; Paldino	The Alchemist; Daringer	4:10
9.	"Joe Pesci 38"	Pennick; Paldino	Daringer	3:34
10.	"Who Are You" (featuring Melanie Rutherford and Royce da 5'9")	Pennick; Paldino; Melanie Rutherford; Ryan Daniel Montgomery	Daringer	3:19
11.	"Fifty One" (featuring Westside Gunn)	Pennick; Maman; Worthy	The Alchemist	3:50
12.	"Rick"	Pennick; Paldino	Daringer	3:59
13.	"Langfield"	Pennick; Paldino	Daringer	2:51
14.	"All 70" (featuring Conway the Machine)	Pennick; Paldino; Demond Price	Daringer	4:41
Total length:				52:09
