= Burden of Proof (Benny the Butcher album) =

Studio album by Benny the Butcher
- Released: October 16, 2020
- Recorded: 2019–2020
- Length: 38:17
- Labels: Griselda; Empire
- Producers: Hit-Boy (also exec.); Corbett; G. Ry; Jansport J

Benny the Butcher chronology
The Respected Sopranos (2020)	Burden of Proof (2020)	The Plugs I Met 2 (2021)

Singles from Burden of Proof
- 1. "Timeless" Released: October 9, 2020; 2. "Legend" Released: October 15, 2020

Burden of Proof is the second studio album by American rapper Benny the Butcher. It was released on October 16, 2020, through Griselda/Empire. Produced entirely by Hit-Boy, it features guest appearances from Big Sean, Conway the Machine, Dom Kennedy, Freddie Gibbs, Lil Wayne, Queen Naija, Rick Ross and Westside Gunn. The album was acclaimed by critics and debuted at number 27 on the Billboard 200 with about 19,000 equivalent album units.

== Critical reception ==
Professional ratings
Aggregate scores
Source	Rating
Metacritic	82/100
Review scores
Source	Rating
AllMusic	4/5 stars
Beats per Minute	81%
Clash	8/10
Consequence of Sound	B+
HipHopDX	4.1/5
Pitchfork	7/10

Burden of Proof was met with critical acclaim. At Metacritic, which assigns a normalized rating out of 100 to reviews from mainstream publications, the album received an average score of 82 based on six reviews.

Jayson Buford of Consequence of Sound praised the album, calling it "the biggest Benny album to date, but he doesn't lose what made him great and such a beloved underground rapper. His boasts are as strong as ever, and his flows are cold like the air in the Buffalo streets". Mark Elibert of HipHopDX said, "Benny raps with so much confidence and gratitude here that listeners have to tip their hat to the certified Buffalo legend. For those used to the aggressive, violent music of The Butcher will be happy to hear this fresh, refined take on his sound". Tim Sentz of Beats per Minute stated, "It's a busy record for sure, but it makes for an exhilarating listen front to back. At less than 40 minutes, it's also one of the most compact rap albums of the year, running more like a singer-songwriter level of conciseness and less of an over-zealous rapper".

AllMusic's Fred Thomas compared the album to previous releases, by saying that it "finds Benny the Butcher fully formed after years of development and growth. There's even a marked upgrade in production compared to his 2018 outing Tana Talk 3, which stuck close to the East Coast hip-hop influences that had guided the majority of Benny's work before that point". Robin Murray of Clash said that the album "pushes Benny The Butcher back to the forefront, and offers further evidence that Griselda is one of the most vital labels in North American hip-hop right now". Dylan Green of Pitchfork said, "He has every right to experiment and try on sounds as he sees fit. Hit-Boy attempts to balance this out by heading in the opposite direction so fully that it occasionally overwhelms Benny's personality. ... Burden of Proof is undoubtedly the next step in Benny's evolution, even if the music doesn't always match the vision".

== Track listing ==
Burden of Proof track listing
No.	Title	Writer(s)	Producer(s)	Length
1.	"Burden of Proof"	Jeremie Damon Pennick; Chauncey Alexander Hollis Jr.	Hit-Boy	3:25
2.	"Where Would I Go" (featuring Rick Ross)	Pennick; Hollis Jr.; William Leonard Roberts II	Hit-Boy	2:51
3.	"Sly Green"	Pennick; Hollis Jr.	Hit-Boy	2:47
4.	"One Way Flight" (featuring Freddie Gibbs)	Pennick; Hollis Jr.; Justin Williams; Fredrick Jamel Tipton	Hit-Boy; Jansport J	3:19
5.	"Famous"	Pennick; Hollis Jr.	Hit-Boy	2:44
6.	"Timeless" (featuring Lil Wayne and Big Sean)	Pennick; Hollis Jr.; Dwayne Michael Carter Jr.; Sean Anderson	Hit-Boy	3:50
7.	"New Streets"	Pennick; Hollis Jr.; Williams	Hit-Boy; Jansport J	2:02
8.	"Over the Limit" (featuring Dom Kennedy)	Pennick; Hollis Jr.; Dominic Ross Hunn	Hit-Boy	4:15
9.	"Trade It All"	Pennick; Hollis Jr.; Dustin James Corbett	Hit-Boy; Corbett	2:32
10.	"Thank God I Made It" (featuring Queen Naija)	Pennick; Hollis Jr.; Queen Naija Bulls	Hit-Boy	2:57
11.	"War Paint" (featuring Westside Gunn and Conway the Machine)	Pennick; Hollis Jr.; Alvin Lamar Worthy; Demond Price	Hit-Boy	4:30
12.	"Legend" (with Hit-Boy)	Pennick; Hollis Jr.; Ryan Alexander Martinez	Hit-Boy; G. Ry	3:05
Total length:				38:17

== Charts ==
Chart performance for Burden of Proof
Chart (2020–2021)	Peak position
Belgian Albums (Ultratop Wallonia)	139
Canadian Albums (Billboard)	100
UK R&B Albums (Official Charts)	10
US Billboard 200	27
US Top R&B/Hip-Hop Albums (Billboard)	14
