= Losin Control =

2015 single by Russ

Single by Russ

from the album There's Really a Wolf
- Released: November 9, 2015
- Recorded: 2015
- Genre: Hip hop; R&B
- Length: 3:57
- Label: Diemon; Columbia
- Songwriter: Russ
- Producer: Russ

Russ singles chronology
"What They Want" (2015)	"Losin Control" (2015)	"Do It Myself" (2015)

Music video
- "Losin Control" on YouTube

Losin Control is a song by American rapper Russ. It was released on his SoundCloud page on November 9, 2015. Russ included this song on his twelfth and major label debut studio album There's Really a Wolf. The song was mixed, mastered, engineered, produced, written, and performed by Russ.

== Music video ==
Russ debuted the music video to "Losin Control" through his Vevo account on February 1, 2016. As of April 2025, the song has over 448 million views on YouTube.

== Commercial performance ==
"Losin Control" debuted at number 89 US Billboard Hot 100 chart on March 18, 2017 chart week. The song eventually peaked at number 62 on the chart. "Losin Control" is Russ' second song to appear on the Billboard Hot 100 following "What They Want". On June 29, 2017, the single was certified platinum by the Recording Industry Association of America (RIAA) for sales of over a million digital copies in the United States. On August 23, 2018, the single was certified triple platinum for sales of over three million digital copies in the United States.

== Charts ==
=== Weekly charts ===
Chart (2016–17)	Peak position
US Billboard Hot 100	62
US Hot R&B/Hip-Hop Songs (Billboard)	28
US Rhythmic Airplay (Billboard)	8

=== Year-end charts ===
Chart (2017)	Position
US Hot R&B/Hip-Hop Songs (Billboard)	63
US Rhythmic (Billboard)	42

== Certifications ==
Region	Certification	Certified units/sales
Australia (ARIA)	Platinum	70,000^{‡}
Canada (Music Canada)	2× Platinum	160,000^{‡}
New Zealand (RMNZ)	2× Platinum	60,000^{‡}
United Kingdom (BPI)	Silver	200,000^{‡}
United States (RIAA)	8× Platinum	8,000,000^{‡}
^{‡} Sales+streaming figures based on certification alone.
