= Psycho, Pt. 2 =

2016 single by Russ

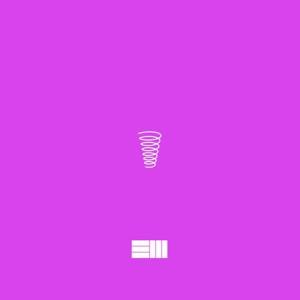

Single by Russ
- Released: November 8, 2016
- Length: 2:41
- Label: Russ My Way; Columbia
- Songwriter(s): Russell Vitale
- Producer(s): Russ

Russ singles chronology
"For the Stunt" (2016)	"Psycho, Pt. 2" (2016)	"Fallin' Too" (2016)

Music video
- "Psycho, Pt. 2" on YouTube

"Psycho, Pt. 2" is a single by American rapper Russ, released on November 8, 2016 and produced by Russ himself. It is a sequel to his 2014 song "Psycho".

== Composition ==
The song contains a "wavy" beat and two verses. Lyrically, Russ sings about how a girl he loves has "got [him] going psycho", and thinking about her as he drinks.

== Certifications ==
Region	Certification	Certified units/sales
New Zealand (RMNZ)	Platinum	30,000^{‡}
United States (RIAA)	Platinum	1,000,000^{‡}
^{‡} Sales+streaming figures based on certification alone.
