= The Plugs I Met 2 =

EP by Benny The Butcher and Harry Fraud
- Released: March 19, 2021
- Length: 28:33
- Label: Black Soprano Family; Griselda; SRFSCHL
- Producer: Harry Fraud

Benny the Butcher chronology
Burden of Proof (2020)	The Plugs I Met 2 (2021)	Trust the Sopranos (2021)

Harry Fraud chronology
The Fraud Department (2021)	The Plugs I Met 2 (2021)

Singles from The Plugs I Met 2
- 1. "Thanksgiving" Released: March 12, 2021

The Plugs I Met 2 is a collaborative extended play by American rapper Benny the Butcher and producer Harry Fraud. It was released on March 19, 2021, by Black Soprano Family, Griselda Records and SRFSCHL as a sequel to Benny's 2019 EP The Plugs I Met. Produced entirely by Fraud, it features guest appearances from 2 Chainz, Chinx, Fat Joe, French Montana, Jim Jones, Rick Hyde and Teyonahhh. The album debuted at number 33 on the US Billboard 200 albums chart.

== Critical reception ==
Professional ratings
Aggregate scores
Source	Rating
Metacritic	79/100
Review scores
Source	Rating
AllMusic	4/5 stars
Beats Per Minute	78%
Clash	8/10
Exclaim!	8/10
HipHopDX	4.2/5
NME	3/5 stars
Pitchfork	7.8/10
RapReviews	8.5/10
Rolling Stone	3.5/5 stars

The Plugs I Met 2 was met with generally favorable reviews from critics. At Metacritic, which assigns a normalized rating out of 100 to reviews from mainstream publications, the album received an average score of 79, based on nine reviews.

Sy Shackleford of RapReviews.com praised the work, writing: "The raps are solid and the production under Fraud is not polished, but more refined this time around. All in all, The Plugs I Met 2 is another feather in Benny's cap". Riley Wallace of HipHopDX wrote: "Nitpicking on the extra grams aside, with Plugs I Met 2, Benny not only adds a well-rounded arc to his discography but also solidifies his status as an elder statesman/role model for a new generation who could genuinely use the perspective. While he's just as guilty of glorifying his former lifestyle as any rapper, his music exemplifies the difference authenticity makes". Robin Murray of Clash stated: "it's less of a Burden of Proof expansion pack and more of a statement in its own right, one that underlines Benny The Butcher's ascension as one of the most vital voices in rap today". Luke Fox of Exclaim! wrote: "the shadows of the trap loom large on Benny's dense and detailed The Plugs I Met 2 EP, the sequel to 2019's impeccable original with producer DJ Shay. This time, New York underground producer Harry Fraud's soundscape elevates both the melancholy and menace to cinematic heights". Mimi Kenny of Beats Per Minute wrote: "Benny and the rest of Griselda are a force so reliable and prolific that they should be boring by now. But The Plugs I Met 2 suggests that we're just getting to know them". Pete Tosiello of Pitchfork resumed that the album "maintains a smirking joie de vivre—just so long as you're on the right side of it". Mankaprr Conteh of Rolling Stone wrote that the rapper is "a convincing rap sage; a captivating spitter offering his nefarious experiences with an abundance of awareness of their nuances and influence". Kyann-Sian Williams of NME wrote: "the rapper's attention to detail is undeniable – but serving up a pile of rhymes, rather than full-bodied songs with snappy hooks, can be boring no matter how skillful you are. Even the star-name features can't really lift this skippable sequel and its samey songs, which is a shame, given Benny the Butcher's proven penmanship".

== Track listing ==
No.	Title	Writer(s)	Length
1.	"When Tony Met Sosa"	Jeremie Pennick; Rory William Quigley	2:21
2.	"Overall" (featuring Chinx and Teyonahhh)	Pennick; Lionel Pickens; Teyonahhh; Quigley	3:26
3.	"Plug Talk" (featuring 2 Chainz)	Pennick; Tauheed Epps; Quigley	3:16
4.	"Live By It"	Pennick; Quigley; Tommy Flaaten	2:52
5.	"Talkin' Back" (featuring Fat Joe)	Pennick; Joseph Antonio Cartagena; Quigley	2:43
6.	"No Instructions"	Pennick; Quigley; Thomas Paladino; Flaaten	3:39
7.	"Longevity" (featuring French Montana and Jim Jones)	Pennick; Karim Kharbouch; Joseph Guillermo Jones II; Quigley; Flaaten	4:01
8.	"Survivor's Remorse" (featuring Rick Hyde)	Pennick; Quigley; Antonio Hernandez; Christian Pfluge; Darius Grayson; Fred Lowinger; Matt Carillo	3:42
9.	"Thanksgiving"	Pennick; Quigley	2:31
Total length:			28:33

== Personnel ==
- Jeremie "Benny the Butcher" Pennick – main artist, vocals
- Rory "Harry Fraud" Quigley – main artist, producer
- Lionel "Chinx" Pickens – featured artist, vocals (track 2)
- Teyonahhh – backing vocals (track 2)
- Tauheed "2 Chainz" Epps – featured artist, vocals (track 3)
- Joseph "Fat Joe" Cartagena – featured artist, vocals (track 5)
- Karim "French Montana" Kharbouch – featured artist, vocals (track 7)
- Jim Jones – featured artist, vocals (track 7)
- Rick Hyde – featured artist, vocals (track 8)
- John Sparkz – mixing, mastering

== Charts ==
Chart performance for The Plugs I Met 2
Chart (2021)	Peak position
UK R&B Albums (OCC)	21
US Billboard 200	33
US Top R&B/Hip-Hop Albums (Billboard)	16
US Independent Albums (Billboard)	5
