= Pull the Trigger =

2015 single by Russ

Single by Russ

from the album There's Really a Wolf
- Released: July 28, 2015
- Length: 2:36
- Label: Diemon; Columbia
- Songwriter(s): Russell Vitale; Peter Taylor; Cliff Twemlow
- Producer(s): Russ

Russ singles chronology
"Juice & Sauce" (2015)	"Pull the Trigger" (2015)	"What They Want" (2015)

Music video
- "Pull the Trigger" on YouTube

"Pull the Trigger" is a song by American rapper Russ, released on July 28, 2015, as the lead single from his twelfth and major-label debut studio album There's Really a Wolf (2017). It was produced Russ himself, who also co-wrote the song with Peter Taylor and Cliff Twemlow.

== Composition ==
The song contains a piano riff and kick drums. The lyrics are about motivating oneself to take action soon without having to rely on others: "Pull the trigger, ain't nobody gonna do it for you".

== Music video ==
An official music video was released on July 18, 2016. Directed by Edgar Esteves, it sees Russ spending the night with a girl he loves. He also becomes involved in an illegal deal that goes awry and ends in bloodshed.

== Certifications ==
Region	Certification	Certified units/sales
Canada (Music Canada)	Platinum	80,000^{‡}
New Zealand (RMNZ)	Platinum	30,000^{‡}
United States (RIAA)	Platinum	1,000,000^{‡}
^{‡} Sales+streaming figures based on certification alone.
