= Missin You Crazy =

2018 single by Russ

Single by Russ

from the album Zoo
- Released: September 7, 2018
- Genre: Hip hop; R&B
- Length: 3:46
- Label: Diemon; Columbia
- Songwriter(s): Russell Vitale
- Producer(s): Russ

Russ singles chronology
"The Flute Song" (2018)	"Missin You Crazy" (2018)	"Perfect Time" (2018)

Music video
- "Missin You Crazy" on YouTube

"Missin You Crazy" is a song by American rapper Russ, released on September 7, 2018, from his thirteenth studio album Zoo as the third single. It was produced by Russ himself.

== Composition ==
"Missin You Crazy" is an R&B song which finds Russ reminiscing a love affair in the past and missing his former lover.

== Critical reception ==
In a review of Zoo, Scott Glaysher of HipHopDX wrote "The album's center is filled with strong yet soothingly produced cuts that highlight Russ' strengths as a songwriter and storyteller", citing "Missin You Crazy" as an example.

== Music video ==
An official music video was released on December 12, 2018. It sees Russ in flying convertible, cruising through the air in his hometown of Atlanta. A girl sits next to him. They briefly stop at a billboard in the sky that advertises Zoo, and then snuggle up as they drive above the clouds. The moon appears in the background at the end of the video.

== Other versions ==
On February 6, 2019, Russ released an acoustic version of the song.

== Charts ==
Chart (2018–2019)	Peak position
New Zealand Hot Singles (RMNZ)	21
US Bubbling Under Hot 100 Singles (Billboard)	22
US Bubbling Under R&B/Hip-Hop Songs (Billboard)	6
US Rhythmic (Billboard)	16

== Certifications ==
Region	Certification	Certified units/sales
Canada (Music Canada)	Platinum	80,000^{‡}
New Zealand (RMNZ)	Platinum	30,000^{‡}
United States (RIAA)	2× Platinum	2,000,000^{‡}
^{‡} Sales+streaming figures based on certification alone.
