= Workin on Me =

2024 single by Russ and 6lack

Single by Russ and 6lack
- Released: May 17, 2024
- Length: 5:00
- Label: Diemon
- Songwriters: Russell Vitale; Ricardo Valentine Jr.
- Producer: Russ

Russ singles chronology
"That's My Girl" / "Tired" (2024)	"Workin on Me" (2024)	"Best Friend" (2024)

6lack singles chronology
"Come Alive" (2024)	"Workin on Me" (2024)	"Bird Flu" (2026)

"Workin on Me" is a song by American rapper Russ and American singer 6lack, released on May 17, 2024.

== Background ==
Russ gave some background information on the song to The Source: "I made this song a little over a year ago and didn't have a second verse on it. I included a snippet of the song on my fan voting platform and it was voted in the top 3. I sent 6lack the song to jump on and he killed it, and we're going on an arena tour this summer."

== Composition ==
The song uses a "downtempo, grungy" guitar loop, with lyrics revolving around failed relationships and struggling in self-improvement. Russ raps and croons for the first half of the track, before 6lack performs a verse in which he apologizes for his wrongdoings and promises to be a better person.

== Critical reception ==
Shawn Grant of The Source wrote, "This soulful and introspective track highlights Russ' vulnerable vocals and lyricism, complemented by a poignant verse from 6lack."

== Charts ==
Chart performance for "Workin on Me"
Chart (2024)	Peak position
New Zealand Hot Singles (RMNZ)	8
