= Shake the Snow Globe =

Studio album by Russ
- Released: January 31, 2020
- Genre: Hip-hop
- Length: 61:06
- Label: Diemon; Columbia
- Producer: Russ (also exec.); Avedon; Bak; Benjamin Lasnier; Boi-1da; Cvre; DJ Pain 1; Dreamlife; Illmind; Jahaan Sweet; Jasper Harris; Lasse Qvist; Lee Major; Memory; Murda Beatz; My Best Friend Jacob; Saint Mino; Scott Storch; Sean Momberger; Sevn Thomas; Shalfi Edu; Stacktrace

Russ chronology
Zoo (2018)	Shake the Snow Globe (2020)	Chomp (2020)

Deluxe edition cover

Singles from Shake the Snow Globe
- 1. "Civil War" Released: May 8, 2019; 2. "Paranoid" Released: June 6, 2019; 3. "Summer at 7" Released: July 25, 2019; 4. "Best on Earth" Released: October 17, 2019

Shake the Snow Globe (stylized in all caps) is the fourteenth studio album by American rapper Russ. It was released on January 31, 2020, through Diemon and Columbia Records. The deluxe edition was later released on May 19, 2020. It features guest appearances from Benny the Butcher, Bia, Boogie, Bugus, Devin the Dude, Kiana Ledé, Rick Ross, and Ty Dolla Sign. The production on the album was mostly handled by Russ, but also featured production by Boi-1da, Illmind, Scott Storch, Sevn Thomas, Jahaan Sweet and Murda Beatz among others.

Shake the Snow Globe was supported by four singles: "Civil War", "Paranoid", "Summer at 7" and "Best on Earth". The album received critical acclaim reviews from music critics and was also a commercial success. The album opened at number four on the US Billboard 200 chart, earning 63,000 album-equivalent units in its first week.

== Critical reception ==
Professional ratings
Review scores
Source	Rating
Earmilk	5/5 stars
HipHopDX	3.9/5
NME	4/5 stars

Shake the Snow Globe was met with widespread acclaim.

Writing for NME, Will Lavin gave the album a positive review, praising a new melody driven focus and his ever-present uncompromising lyrical content. The writer also praising the album's consistency saying it's his most consistent album to date. Lavin also talked about his "prioritizing features from up-and-coming talent over established marquee names". Furthermore, Lavin said that "‘Shake The Snow Globe’ is unique. Consistent from start to finish, it's a more complete body of work than 2018's ‘Zoo’".

== Commercial performance ==
Shake the Snow Globe debuted at number four on the US Billboard 200 chart, earning 63,000 album-equivalent units (including 39,000 copies in pure album sales) in its first week. This became Russ' third consecutive US top-ten album.

== Track listing ==
Credits adapted from Tidal.

Shake the Snow Globe – Standard edition
No.	Title	Writer(s)	Producer(s)	Length
1.	"Need a Minute"	Russell Vitale; Shalfi Edu	Russ; Edu^{[b]}	2:44
2.	"Guess What" (featuring Rick Ross)	Vitale; William Roberts II; Matthew Samuels; Jahaan Sweet	Boi-1da; Sweet^{[a]}	3:26
3.	"A Lot More"	Vitale; Samuels; Rupert Thomas, Jr.; Leigh Elliott; Sean Momberger	Boi-1da; Sevn Thomas; Lee Major^{[a]}; Momberger^{[a]}	3:20
4.	"Can't Go On"	Vitale; Curtis Colbert; Harriet Hurst	Russ	3:03
5.	"Asshole" (featuring Bugus)	Vitale; Edu; Bugus Thompson	Russ; Edu^{[b]}	3:42
6.	"Nighttime" (Interlude)	Vitale; Shama Joseph; Theron Thomas; Timothy Thomas; Robyn Fenty; George Stone	Russ	3:09
7.	"All to You" (featuring Kiana Ledé)	Vitale; Kiana Brown	Russ	3:04
8.	"Shots"	Vitale; Ramon Ibanga, Jr.; Benjamin Lasnier; Lasse Qvist	Illmind; Lasnier^{[a]}; Qvist^{[a]}	2:50
9.	"Patience"	Vitale; Ibanga, Jr.; Jacob Wilkinson-Smith; Jun Ha Kim; Nicole Ariana	Illmind; My Best Friend Jacob^{[a]}; Cvre^{[b]}	3:04
10.	"I Thought You Got Me" (featuring Benny the Butcher)	Vitale; Jeremie Pennick; Amos Roddy; Jonas Antonsson; Graham Willard	Russ	4:21
11.	"Foot on the Gas" (featuring Devin the Dude)	Vitale; Devin Copeland	Russ	2:38
12.	"Momma"	Vitale; Ady Suleiman; Edward Black	Russ	3:14
13.	"Civil War (bonus)"	Vitale; Samuels; Ibanga, Jr.; Sweet	Boi-1da; Illmind^{[a]}; Sweet^{[a]}	2:24
14.	"Best on Earth (bonus)" (featuring Bia)	Vitale; Samuels; Sweet; Bianca Landrau; Jonathan Smith; Craig Love; Donnell Prince; Jamal Glaze; LaMarquis Jefferson; Lawrence Edwards	Boi-1da; Sweet	2:40
Total length:				43:49

Credits adapted from Tidal.

Shake the Snow Globe (Deluxe)
No.	Title	Writer(s)	Producer(s)	Length
1.	"3am" (featuring Ty Dolla Sign)	Vitale; Tyrone Griffin, Jr.; Scott Storch; Vincent van den Ende	Storch; Avedon^{[a]}	3:20
2.	"Sky" (featuring Boogie)	Vitale; Anthony Dixson	Russ	3:33
3.	"You Coulda Left Me Alone"	Vitale; Patick Stumph; Andrew Hurley; Joseph Trohman; Peter Wentz III; Pacal Bayley; Jan Branicki; Stephen Banik; Jason Kempen	Russ; DJ Pain 1^{[a]}; Dreamlife^{[a]}; Stacktrace^{[a]}; Memory^{[a]}	2:21
4.	"No Tears Left"	Vitale; Shane Lindstrom; Jasper Harris; Alexander Bak	Murda Beatz; Harris; Bak	3:56
5.	"2006"	Vitale; Robert Kelly	Russ	3:13
6.	"Summer at 7"	Vitale; Lamont Brown	Russ	2:54
7.	"Paranoid"	Vitale; Samuels; Sweet; Carlos Martin; Mino Drerup	Boi-1da; Sweet; Rowan; Saint Mino	3:02
Total length:				61:06

Notes

- ^{^[a]} signifies a co-producer
- ^{^[b]} signifies an additional producer
- All track titles are stylized in all caps
- "Patience" contains additional vocals by Nicole Ariana

== Charts ==
=== Weekly charts ===
Chart performance for Shake the Snow Globe
Chart (2020)	Peak position
Australian Albums (ARIA)	44
Belgian Albums (Ultratop Flanders)	52
Canadian Albums (Billboard)	21
Dutch Albums (Album Top 100)	90
French Albums (SNEP)	174
New Zealand Albums (RMNZ)	29
Swiss Albums (Schweizer Hitparade)	35
US Billboard 200	4
US Top R&B/Hip-Hop Albums (Billboard)	4

=== Year-end charts ===
Year-end chart performance for Shake the Snow Globe
Chart (2020)	Position
US Top R&B/Hip-Hop Albums (Billboard)	85

== Certifications ==
Certifications for Shake the Snow Globe
Region	Certification	Certified units/sales
New Zealand (RMNZ)	Gold	7,500^{‡}
United States (RIAA)	Gold	500,000^{‡}
^{‡} Sales+streaming figures based on certification alone.
