= Seduce (song) =

2021 single by Russ featuring Capella Grey

Single by Russ featuring Capella Grey
- Released: September 24, 2021
- Length: 1:57
- Label: Russ My Way
- Songwriters: Russell Vitale; Curtis Jackson II; Ramon Ibanga Jr.; Leon Tiepold; Huynh Thi Nguyen
- Producers: Illmind; Tiepold; Nguyen

Russ singles chronology
"When This Was All New" (2021)	"Seduce" (2021)	"Losin Control, Pt. 2" (2021)

Capella Grey singles chronology
"Find My Way 2 U" (2021)	"Seduce" (2021)	"Gyalis (Remix)" (2021)

Music video
- "Seduce" on YouTube

"Seduce" is a song by American rapper Russ featuring American singer Capella Grey and additional vocals from singer Tamae. It was produced by Illmind, Leon Tiepold and Tamae.

== Content ==
Russ and Capella Grey sing about their relationships with their respective lovers.

== Music video ==
An official music video for the song was released on December 27, 2021.

== Charts ==
Chart performance for "Seduce"
Chart (2021)	Peak position
Canada Hot 100 (Billboard)	79
New Zealand (Recorded Music NZ)	18
US Bubbling Under Hot 100 (Billboard)	20

== Certifications ==
Certifications for "Seduce"
Region	Certification	Certified units/sales
New Zealand (RMNZ)	Platinum	30,000^{‡}
United States (RIAA)	Gold	500,000^{‡}
^{‡} Sales+streaming figures based on certification alone.
