= Nasty (Russ song) =

2023 single by Russ

Single by Russ
- Released: March 17, 2023
- Genre: Dirty rap; crunk
- Length: 1:56
- Label: Asylum; Diemon
- Songwriter: Russell Vitale
- Producer: Russ

Russ singles chronology
"Gimme Love" (2023)	"Nasty" (2023)	"Te Encontré" (2023)

"Nasty" is a single by American rapper Russ, released on March 17, 2023 through Asylum Records and Diemon. It was produced by Russ.

== Composition ==
The song contains sexually explicit lyrics, which revolve around Russ' relationship with a girl and him wanting her to "get nasty".

== Charts ==
Chart performance for "Nasty"
Chart (2023)	Peak position
Canada Hot 100 (Billboard)	54
New Zealand (Recorded Music NZ)	39
US Billboard Hot 100	75
US Hot R&B/Hip-Hop Songs (Billboard)	22
US Rhythmic Airplay (Billboard)	38

== Certifications ==
Certifications for "Nasty"
Region	Certification	Certified units/sales
New Zealand (RMNZ)	Gold	15,000^{‡}
United States (RIAA)	Gold	500,000^{‡}
^{‡} Sales+streaming figures based on certification alone.
