= Whole Lotta Money =

2021 single by Bia

Single by Bia

from the EP For Certain
- Released: May 18, 2021
- Recorded: 2020
- Length: 2:36
- Label: Epic
- Songwriter: Bianca Landrau
- Producers: London Jae; Tee Romano

Bia singles chronology
"Skate" (2020)	"Whole Lotta Money" (2021)	"Whole Lotta Money (Remix)" (2021)

"Whole Lotta Money" is a song by American rapper Bia, released on May 18, 2021, as the fifth single from Bia's second EP, For Certain. The song's music video was released on April 8, 2021. Following viral success on social media platform TikTok, the song's original version peaked at number three on the US Bubbling Under Hot 100 chart. A remix featuring American rapper Nicki Minaj was released on July 9, 2021, and reached number 16 of the Billboard Hot 100.

== Lyrics ==
In an interview with Genius, Bia said that "With this song, I really feel like wealth is in the mind. So, I didn't want people to think like, however much money you have today is how much you're gonna have tomorrow. You just gotta go get it."

== Charts ==
Chart performance for "Whole Lotta Money"
Chart (2021)	Peak position
US Bubbling Under Hot 100 (Billboard)	3
US Hot R&B/Hip-Hop Songs (Billboard)	40
US Rhythmic Airplay (Billboard)	24

== Certifications ==
Certifications for "Whole Lotta Money"
Region	Certification	Certified units/sales
Canada (Music Canada)	Platinum	80,000^{‡}
United States (RIAA)	2× Platinum	2,000,000^{‡}
^{‡} Sales+streaming figures based on certification alone.

== Nicki Minaj remix ==
"Whole Lotta Money (Remix)"

Single by Bia featuring Nicki Minaj

from the EP For Certain (Deluxe)
- Released: July 9, 2021
- Genre: Hip hop
- Length: 3:49
- Label: Epic
- Songwriters: Bianca Landrau; Onika Maraj; London Jae; Rodrick Doss Jr.; Tee Romano
- Producers: London Jae; BeatGodz; Tee Romano

Bia singles chronology
"Whole Lotta Money" (2021)	"Whole Lotta Money (Remix)" (2021)	"Besito" (2021)

Nicki Minaj singles chronology
"What That Speed Bout!?" (2020)	"Whole Lotta Money (Remix)" (2021)	"Boyz" (2021)

Animated video
- "Whole Lotta Money (Remix)" on YouTube

On July 9, 2021, Bia released a remix of "Whole Lotta Money", featuring American rapper Nicki Minaj.

=== Background and release ===
According to Rolling Stone, "when Nicki Minaj heard “Whole Lotta Money,” she liked it so much that she reached out to the rapper on Instagram." A day prior to the song's release, Minaj went on social media to announce she would be on Instagram Live the following day to announce something very important. On the night of release, she went live with Bia to announce the release of the "Whole Lotta Money" remix.

=== Critical reception ===
CedricCed gave "Whole Lotta Money" a B rating. According to him, "the album version without assistance from an already established rapper is much more worth listeners’ time". He added that "BIA is future-proof in the rap game if she succeeds in sustaining the momentum reached from the feature with Minaj".

The Musical Hype rated the song 4 out of 5 stars. According to him, "BIA, assisted by the ever risqué and unapologetic Nicki Minaj drop a surefire, addictive banger. It checks off the boxes with ample personality from both rappers, confident, compelling rhymes (even being shallow), and hard-nosed, minimal production."

=== Year-end lists ===
Publication	List	Rank	Ref.
Rolling Stone	50 Best Songs of 2021	38	

=== Awards and nominations ===
Award	Year	Category	Result	Ref.
BET Hip Hop Awards	2021	Song of the Year	Nominated	
BET Hip Hop Awards	2021	Best Collaboration	Nominated	

=== Charts ===
==== Weekly charts ====
Weekly chart performance for "Whole Lotta Money" (Remix)
Chart (2021)	Peak position
Canada Hot 100 (Billboard)	42
Global 200 (Billboard)	32
New Zealand Hot Singles (RMNZ)	11
US Billboard Hot 100	16
US Hot R&B/Hip-Hop Songs (Billboard)	6
US Rhythmic Airplay (Billboard)	11

==== Year-end charts ====
Year-end chart performance for "Whole Lotta Money" (Remix)
Chart (2021)	Position
US Hot R&B/Hip-Hop Songs (Billboard)	41
US Rhythmic (Billboard)	47

== Release history ==
Release history for "Whole Lotta Money"
Region	Date	Format	Version	Label	Ref.
Various	December 11, 2020	Digital download; streaming	Original	Epic	
United States	May 18, 2021	Rhythmic contemporary radio	Original	Epic	
Various	July 9, 2021	Digital download; streaming	Remix	Epic	
