= Ain't Nobody Takin My Baby =

2016 single by Russ

Single by Russ
- Released: December 23, 2016
- Length: 3:09
- Label: Russ My Way
- Songwriter(s): Russell Vitale
- Producer(s): Russ

Russ singles chronology
"Fallin' Too" (2016)	"Ain't Nobody Takin My Baby" (2016)	"Sideline Number" (2017)

Music video
- "Ain't Nobody Takin My Baby" on YouTube

"Ain't Nobody Takin My Baby" is a single by American rapper Russ, released on December 23, 2016, through his SoundCloud page. It was produced by Russ himself.

== Background ==
In an Instagram Live session, Russ said about the song:

This song is an unhealthy relationship anthem and I said that on stage a lot. Literally what I said, "I don't care about an argument I'll still be here tomorrow." It's fucked up, it's a mess, it's a shitty relationship, or like, "I'll be damned if I lose you" type shit.

Russ has stated the song is about the same woman he talks about in his songs "I Think My Girl Caught a Body" and "Goodbye".

In an interview with KMEL in February 2017, Russ revealed the song was originally planned to feature singer Kehlani.

"Ain't Nobody Takin My Baby" is Russ' first independently released single to be certified Platinum.

== Composition ==
The song uses a slow tempo and features claps in the production, over which Russ reflects on his relationship with his girlfriend and declares "nobody is taking his baby". He also mentions being arrested with her.

== Certifications ==
Region	Certification	Certified units/sales
New Zealand (RMNZ)	Platinum	30,000^{‡}
United States (RIAA)	Platinum	1,000,000^{‡}
^{‡} Sales+streaming figures based on certification alone.
