= The Flute Song =

2018 single by Russ

Single by Russ

from the album Zoo
- Released: August 17, 2018
- Genre: Hip hop
- Length: 2:27
- Label: Diemon; Columbia
- Songwriter(s): Russell Vitale; Scott Storch; Vincent van den Ende
- Producer(s): Storch; Avedon

Russ singles chronology
"Tell Me Why" (2018)	"The Flute Song" (2018)	"Missin You Crazy" (2018)

Music video
- "The Flute Song" on YouTube

"The Flute Song" is a song by American rapper Russ, released on August 17, 2018, as the lead single from his thirteenth studio album Zoo (2018). It was produced by Scott Storch and Avedon.

== Background ==
In April 2018, Russ previewed a snippet of the song on Instagram.

== Composition ==
Over flute-driven production, Russ boasts about doing whatever he wants and always winning, and shows contempt for people he considers enemies.

== Critical reception ==
Scott Glaysher of HipHopDX praised the production, commenting it "should be in the conversation for beat of the year", but criticized the lyrics: "Russ assumes the role of unsparing ZOO keeper to all his alleged inferior contemporaries. 'They ain't upholding the code, the industry full of some hoes / They lettin' like anything go / People are shady as fuck / I keep to myself, but I feel the energy though / None of these people are friends to me though' quickly lets listeners know that it's still Russ vs. everyone."

== Charts ==
Chart (2018)	Peak position
Belgium (Ultratop 50 Flanders)	47
Belgium Urban (Ultratop 50 Flanders)	44
Canada (Canadian Hot 100)	90
New Zealand (Recorded Music NZ)	39
US Bubbling Under Hot 100 Singles (Billboard)	15
US Bubbling Under R&B/Hip-Hop Songs (Billboard)	5
US Rhythmic (Billboard)	30

== Certifications ==
Region	Certification	Certified units/sales
Canada (Music Canada)	Gold	40,000^{‡}
United States (RIAA)	Gold	500,000^{‡}
^{‡} Sales+streaming figures based on certification alone.
