= That's My Girl (Russ song) =

2024 single by Russ

Single by Russ
- Released: April 19, 2024
- Genre: Pop rap; R&B
- Length: 2:14
- Label: Diemon
- Songwriter: Russell Vitale
- Producer: Russ

Russ singles chronology
"I Got You" (2024)	"That's My Girl" / "Tired" (2024)	"Workin on Me" (2024)

"That's My Girl" is a song by American rapper Russ, released on April 19, 2024, as a two-track single along with his song "Tired".

== Background ==
In late March 2024, Russ launched a platform on which every few weeks, fans would vote for an unreleased song of his to be released to streaming services. During one "campaign", "That's My Girl" received the most votes while "Tired" came in second, but Russ released both songs.

== Composition ==
Regarding its style, "That's My Girl" has been described as a "bouncy rhythmic" song and "raunchy pop rap/R&B crossover". The lyrics center on Russ' love for intimate moments with his female lover.

== Charts ==
Chart performance for "That's My Girl"
Chart (2024)	Peak position
New Zealand Hot Singles (RMNZ)	11
US Bubbling Under Hot 100 (Billboard)	8
US Hot R&B/Hip-Hop Songs (Billboard)	37
