= Hot Shit (song) =

Single by Cardi B featuring Kanye West, and Lil Durk
- Released: July 1, 2022
- Recorded: 2021–2022
- Genre: Trap
- Length: 3:31
- Label: Atlantic
- Songwriters: Belcalis Almánzar; Kanye West; Durk Banks; Jordan Thorpe; Neville Livingston; Brytavious Chambers; Marquell Jones
- Producers: Tay Keith; BanBwoi

Cardi B singles chronology
"Shake It" (2022)	"Hot Shit" (2022)	"Tomorrow 2" (2022)

Kanye West singles chronology
"True Love" (2022)	"Hot Shit" (2022)	"Burn Everything" (2022)

Lil Durk singles chronology
"Did Shit to Me" (2022)	"Hot Shit" (2022)	"Save Me" (2022)

Music video
- "Hot Shit" on YouTube

"Hot Shit" is a song by American rapper Cardi B featuring fellow American rappers Kanye West, and Lil Durk. It was released on July 1, 2022, through Atlantic Records as a standalone single. The three rappers wrote the song alongside Pardison Fontaine and Bunny Wailer and with producers Tay Keith and BanBwoi.

== Background ==
"Hot Shit" was first announced during a commercial that occurred during the BET Awards 2022. In an interview with Zane Lowe, Cardi B remarked that the song was "older than 'WAP'", with the original demo dating back to 2019.

On June 26, 2022, Cardi B released a preview for the song on Twitter, adding that she had "another surprise" for her fans to be revealed the next day. The surprise was the cover art for "Hot Shit", as well as the announcement of the song's features, Kanye West and Lil Durk. On the song's cover art, Cardi B pays homage to rapper Lil' Kim.

== Composition ==
According to Cardi B, "Hot Shit" deviates from her previous raunchy music, featuring a new more "masculine" sound that is "great for the clubs." Daily Beast concurred, describing the song as "manly". Cardi B's verse in "Hot Shit" includes references to the wrestler Jimmy Snuka. The song also contains a sample from Marcia Griffiths's 1983 track "Electric Boogie".

== Music video ==
The official music video was directed by Lado Kvataniya. It was released on July 13, 2022, after being delayed for two weeks after the release of the single. The video begins with Cardi towering over New York City before strutting down the communications tower of a skyscraper, and depicts her being set ablaze by two robotic arms and decked out in icy jewelry. Lil Durk and West appear later in the video to deliver their verses in equally over-the-top CGI settings.

== Awards ==
Awards and nominations for "Hot Shit"
Year	Organization	Award	Result	Ref.
2022	BET Hip Hop Awards	Song of the Year	Nominated	
2022	BET Hip Hop Awards	Best Hip-Hop Video	Nominated	
2022	BET Hip Hop Awards	Best Collaboration	Nominated	

== Charts ==
=== Weekly charts ===
Weekly chart performance for "Hot Shit"
Chart (2022)	Peak position
Australia (ARIA)	39
Canada Hot 100 (Billboard)	28
Global 200 (Billboard)	29
Greece International (IFPI)	93
Ireland (IRMA)	60
New Zealand Hot Singles (RMNZ)	2
South Africa Streaming (TOSAC)	45
Sweden Heatseeker (Sverigetopplistan)	5
UK Singles (OCC)	59
UK Hip Hop/R&B (OCC)	17
US Billboard Hot 100	13
US Hot R&B/Hip-Hop Songs (Billboard)	7
US R&B/Hip-Hop Airplay (Billboard)	3
US Rhythmic Airplay (Billboard)	1

=== Year-end charts ===
2022 year-end chart performance for "Hot Shit"
Chart (2022)	Position
US Hot R&B/Hip-Hop Songs (Billboard)	47
US Rhythmic (Billboard)	23
