= There's Really a Wolf =

Studio album by Russ
- Released: May 5, 2017
- Recorded: 2015–2017
- Genre: Hip hop; R&B
- Length: 63:50
- Label: Diemon; Columbia
- Producer: Russ (also exec.)

Russ chronology
How to Rob (2014)	There's Really a Wolf (2017)	Zoo (2018)

Singles from There's Really a Wolf
- 1. "Pull the Trigger" Released: July 28, 2015; 2. "What They Want" Released: August 19, 2015; 3. "Losin Control" Released: November 9, 2015; 4. "Do It Myself" Released: December 30, 2015; 5. "Me You" Released: June 6, 2017

There's Really a Wolf is the twelfth studio album and major-label debut by American rapper Russ, who composed and produced all of the songs. It was released on May 5, 2017, by Diemon and Columbia Records and peaked at number seven on the US Billboard 200 and number four on the US Top R&B/Hip-Hop Albums. On April 18, 2018, it was certified Platinum, and on January 21, 2022, it was certified 2× Platinum.

== Promotion ==
The album was announced on April 19, 2017, with a tweet revealing the album's release date of May 5, 2017.

== Singles ==
All but four of the songs on the album were brand new releases that Russ had recorded and saved from the public eye for a span of two years. The previous released tracks "What They Want", "Pull the Trigger", "Do It Myself", and the R&B track "Losin Control", were all originally released on SoundCloud. "Me You" was sent to rhythmic radio as the third single on June 6, 2017.

== Commercial performance ==
There's Really a Wolf debuted at number seven on the US Billboard 200 and number four on the US Top R&B/Hip-Hop Albums charts moving 49,000 album-equivalent units in its first week of release. On April 18, 2018, the album was certified platinum by the Recording Industry Association of America (RIAA) for combined sales and album-equivalent units of over a million units in the United States.

== Track listing ==
Credits adapted from Tidal. All tracks produced by Russ.

No.	Title	Writer(s)	Length
1.	"I'm Here"	Russell Vitale	3:59
2.	"The Stakeout"	Vitale; Manuel Álvarez-Beigbeder; Purificación Casas-Romero; Alejandra Beigbeder-Casas; Angeles Beigbeder-Casas; Beatriz Beigbeder-Casas; Viviana Beigbeder-Casas	2:51
3.	"Act Now"	Vitale	3:09
4.	"Cherry Hill"	Vitale	3:42
5.	"Me You"	Vitale	2:44
6.	"Ride Slow"	Vitale	3:05
7.	"Don't Lie"	Vitale	3:08
8.	"Do It Myself"	Vitale	2:47
9.	"I Wanna Go Down with You"	Vitale	3:03
10.	"Family & Friends"	Vitale	2:55
11.	"What They Want"	Vitale	2:45
12.	"Got This"	Vitale	2:52
13.	"No Turning Back"	Vitale	2:34
14.	"Losin Control"	Vitale	3:57
15.	"Scared"	Vitale; Bruce Sudano	2:59
16.	"Back to You"	Vitale; Kwabena Frimpong	3:27
17.	"One More Shot"	Vitale	3:11
18.	"Emergency"	Vitale; Gary Henry	3:50
19.	"Pull the Trigger"	Vitale; Peter Taylor; Cliff Twemlow	2:36
20.	"MVP"	Vitale; Josephine Armstead; Tennyson Stephens	4:16
Total length:			63:50

== Charts ==
=== Weekly charts ===
Chart (2017–18)	Peak position
Australian Albums (ARIA)	54
Belgian Albums (Ultratop Flanders)	33
Canadian Albums (Billboard)	9
Dutch Albums (Album Top 100)	144
French Albums (SNEP)	149
New Zealand Albums (RMNZ)	29
Swiss Albums (Schweizer Hitparade)	85
US Billboard 200	7
US Top R&B/Hip-Hop Albums (Billboard)	4

=== Year-end charts ===
Chart (2017)	Position
US Billboard 200	81
US Top R&B/Hip-Hop Albums (Billboard)	28
Chart (2018)	Position
Belgian Albums (Ultratop Flanders)	136
US Billboard 200	83
US Top R&B/Hip-Hop Albums (Billboard)	59

== Certifications ==
Region	Certification	Certified units/sales
Canada (Music Canada)	Platinum	80,000^{‡}
New Zealand (RMNZ)	2× Platinum	30,000^{‡}
United States (RIAA)	2× Platinum	2,000,000^{‡}
^{‡} Sales+streaming figures based on certification alone.
