= Do It Myself =

2015 single by Russ

Single by Russ

from the album There's Really a Wolf
- Released: December 30, 2015
- Length: 2:47
- Label: Diemon; Russ My Way; Columbia; Sony
- Songwriter(s): Russell Vitale
- Producer(s): Russ

Russ singles chronology
"Tsunami" (2015)	"Do It Myself" (2015)	"Try It" (2016)

Music video
- "Do It Myself" on YouTube

"Do It Myself" is a song by American rapper Russ, released on December 30, 2015 as the fourth single from his twelfth and major-label debut studio album There's Really a Wolf (2017). It was produced by Russ himself.

== Composition ==
The song contains a bell-driven beat, over which Russ raps about accomplishing everything as a musical artist by himself. He adds that record labels began contacting him only after he became famous and he always planned to be successful through his own efforts.

== Critical reception ==
Eli Schwadron of XXL gave a positive review, writing "'Do It Myself' is a record with plenty of potential containing catchy melodies and diverse flows. His delivery is clean and pinpoint when he spits, 'Whole game hitting up my phone because my hooks, beats and my raps / Only reason I pick up is 'cuz my family needs the cash.'" Danny Schwartz of HotNewHipHop commented the beat "makes it seem as though Russ is singing a lullaby to the haters as he lowers them into their grave."

== Music video ==
An official music video was released in June 2016. Directed by Edgar Esteves, it sees Russ and a crew of around 20 people in an otherwise vacant parking lot of a discount mall in Atlanta.

== Certifications ==
Region	Certification	Certified units/sales
Canada (Music Canada)	Gold	40,000^{‡}
New Zealand (RMNZ)	Gold	15,000^{‡}
United States (RIAA)	Platinum	1,000,000^{‡}
^{‡} Sales+streaming figures based on certification alone.
