= Zoo (Russ album) =

Studio album by Russ
- Released: September 7, 2018
- Genre: Hip hop; R&B
- Length: 51:00
- Label: Diemon; Columbia
- Producer: Russ (also exec.); Avedon; Scott Storch

Russ chronology
There's Really a Wolf (2017)	Zoo (2018)	Shake the Snow Globe (2020)

Singles from Zoo
- 1. "The Flute Song" Released: August 17, 2018; 2. "Missin You Crazy" Released: September 7, 2018

Zoo (stylized in all caps) is the thirteenth studio album by American rapper Russ. It was released on September 7, 2018, by Diemon and Columbia Records. The album was announced on August 13, 2018. The official tracklist was released on September 4, just three days before the album's release. On September 22, 2018, the album debuted at number four on the US Billboard 200.

== Critical reception ==
Professional ratings
Review scores
Source	Rating
HipHopDX	3.8/5

HipHopDX gave the album a rating of 3.8 out of 5, with writer Scott Glaysher stating: "Zoo lacks outright smash hits but it’s clear Russ’ focus for this sophomore offering was to make a project that was better-rounded than his debut – so in that case, mission accomplished."

== Commercial performance ==
Zoo debuted at number four on the US Billboard 200 chart, earning 79,000 album-equivalent units (including 57,000 in pure album sales) in its first week. This is Russ' second top-ten album.

== Track listing ==
All tracks produced by Russ, with the exception of "The Flute Song", which was produced by Scott Storch and co-produced by Avedon.

No.	Title	Writer(s)	Length
1.	"The Flute Song"	Russell Vitale; Scott Storch; Vincent van den Ende	2:27
2.	"Outlaw"	Vitale; Krzysztof Trzciński	3:42
3.	"Kill Them All"	Vitale; Dominique Laurent	4:27
4.	"Missin You Crazy"	Vitale	3:46
5.	"Voicemail"	Vitale; Donald Wilhoite, Jr.; Gene Vincent de Paul	3:09
6.	"Parkstone Drive"	Vitale; Dominic Miller; Gordon Sumner	3:25
7.	"Begging You"	Vitale	4:12
8.	"Serious"	Vitale; Brian Casey; Brandon Casey; Bryan-Michael Cox	3:08
9.	"Keep My Wits"	Vitale; Donald DeGrate, Jr.	3:58
10.	"Our Time"	Vitale	2:50
11.	"From a Distance"	Vitale	2:55
12.	"Last Forever" (featuring Rick Ross and Snoop Dogg)	Vitale; William Roberts II; Calvin Broadus; Paul Hardcastle	3:55
13.	"Keep It Pushin" (featuring Mahalia)	Vitale; Mahalia Burkmar	5:00
14.	"Fuck That"	Vitale; Peter Gundry	4:04

== Charts ==
=== Weekly charts ===
Chart (2018)	Peak position
Australian Albums (ARIA)	43
Belgian Albums (Ultratop Flanders)	28
Belgian Albums (Ultratop Wallonia)	186
Canadian Albums (Billboard)	12
Dutch Albums (Album Top 100)	38
French Albums (SNEP)	132
New Zealand Albums (RMNZ)	35
Swiss Albums (Schweizer Hitparade)	37
US Billboard 200	4
US Top R&B/Hip-Hop Albums (Billboard)	2

=== Year-end charts ===
Chart (2018)	Position
US Top R&B/Hip-Hop Albums (Billboard)	89

== Certifications ==
Region	Certification	Certified units/sales
New Zealand (RMNZ)	Gold	7,500^{‡}
United States (RIAA)	Gold	500,000^{‡}
^{‡} Sales+streaming figures based on certification alone.
