= London (Bia and J. Cole song) =

2022 single by Bia and J. Cole

Single by Bia and J. Cole

from the EP Really Her
- Released: April 8, 2022
- Genre: Hip-hop
- Length: 4:10
- Label: Epic
- Songwriters: Bianca Landrau; Jermaine Cole; Aziz Dieng; Jon Glasser; Tim Nihan
- Producers: AzizTheShake; Jon Glass; Nihan

Bia singles chronology
"Trampoline" (2022)	"London" (2022)	"Run" (2022)

J. Cole singles chronology
"Scared Money" (2022)	"London" (2022)	"90 Proof" (2023)

Music video
- "London" on YouTube

"London" is a song by American rappers Bia and J. Cole, released on April 8, 2022. The song was produced by AzizTheShake, Jon Glass and Tim Nihan.

== Background ==
Bia announced the single on April 6, 2022, after teasing it on Instagram a day earlier. On April 7, Bia posted a 15-second trailer for the song on YouTube. On the day the song was released, J. Cole revealed some details behind his collaboration with Bia on Instagram:

"I Asked BIA to come through the studio for some whole other shit. First time meeting her. We chop it up. She plays me this new song she had just did. [...] in that moment I was blown away. I thought about this song for a month straight, it was my favorite song and I only heard it one time. She hit me recently and sent me the song (she musta knew I wanted to hear it again!!!) and I was just grateful to have it in my possession. When the thought and conversation came up about me adding a verse, I was excited but genuinely nervous cuz I didn’t even see how the song could be better after what she did to it. I didn't want to fuck nothing up! I'm grateful I ended up catching the right wave"

Bia told Rolling Stone, "We really wanted to capture, celebrate and highlight London culture, while staying authentic to who we are. I definitely got in my London accent bag and people actually tell me it's really good."

== Composition ==
"London" is a UK drill-influenced song that sees Bia and J. Cole rapping in British accents and slang. Bia raps about her luxury shopping, while J. Cole later name-drops Heathrow Airport, Ringo Starr, The O2 Arena, and Elizabeth II in his verse and references American rapper T.I.'s new career as a stand-up comedian.

== Music video ==
The music video was directed by Daps and filmed in London. In the clip, Bia shops in luxury stores of the city, parades down a sidewalk flanked by two Dalmatians, and has a tea party. After that, she cruises down the River Thames on a speedboat with J. Cole, who also gets his height measured while hanging upside down. The video features appearances of landmarks such as Big Ben, as well as cameos from British rapper Unknown T and British model Leomie Anderson.

== Charts ==
Weekly chart performance for "London"
Chart (2022)	Peak position
Canada Hot 100 (Billboard)	55
Global 200 (Billboard)	130
New Zealand Hot Singles (RMNZ)	6
South Africa Streaming (TOSAC)	20
US Billboard Hot 100	62
US Hot R&B/Hip-Hop Songs (Billboard)	20
