= What They Want (Russ song) =

2015 single by Russ

Single by Russ

from the album There's Really a Wolf
- Released: August 19, 2015
- Recorded: 2015
- Genre: Hip hop; R&B
- Length: 2:45
- Label: Diemon; Columbia
- Songwriter(s): Russell Vitale
- Producer(s): Russ

Russ singles chronology
| "Pull the Trigger" (2015) | "What They Want" (2015) | "Losin Control" (2015) |

Music video
- "What They Want" on YouTube

"What They Want" is a song by American rapper Russ. It was released on his SoundCloud page on August 19, 2015. Russ included this song on his 12th (and major-label debut) album There's Really a Wolf. The song was mixed, mastered, engineered, produced, written, and performed by Russ.

== Background ==
The song is a response to labels and women who now want to approach him due to his success as a rapper. In the songs hook, Russ states "Dollar signs, yeah, I know it's what they want", as women now want him for his money, and labels want him for the money they can make off of his hard work.

== Commercial performance ==
"What They Want" debuted at number 99 on the US Billboard Hot 100 chart, on the week of November 12, 2016. This became Russ' first song to appear on the chart. Three weeks later, the single reached its peak at number 83 on the week of December 3, 2016. The song also managed to chart at number 12 on the US Rhythmic Airplay chart on the week of December 3, 2016. On July 26, 2021, the single was certified four times platinum by the Recording Industry Association of America (RIAA) for combined sales and streaming units of over four million units in the United States.

Russ debuted the music video to "What They Want" through his Vevo account on May 3, 2016. As of June 2021, the song has over 320 million views on YouTube.

== Charts ==
| Chart (2016–17) | Peak position |
|---|---|
| Belgium Urban (Ultratop 50 Flanders) | 50 |
| Canada (Canadian Hot 100) | 70 |
| US Billboard Hot 100 | 83 |
| US Hot R&B/Hip-Hop Songs (Billboard) | 33 |

== Certifications ==
| Region | Certification | Certified units/sales |
|---|---|---|
| Australia (ARIA) | Platinum | 70,000^{‡} |
| Canada (Music Canada) | 3× Platinum | 240,000^{‡} |
| France (SNEP) | Gold | 100,000^{‡} |
| New Zealand (RMNZ) | 3× Platinum | 90,000^{‡} |
| Switzerland (IFPI Switzerland) | Gold | 15,000^{‡} |
| United Kingdom (BPI) | Silver | 200,000^{‡} |
| United States (RIAA) | 5× Platinum | 5,000,000^{‡} |
^{‡} Sales+streaming figures based on certification alone.
