= Bia (rapper) =

American rapper (born 1991)

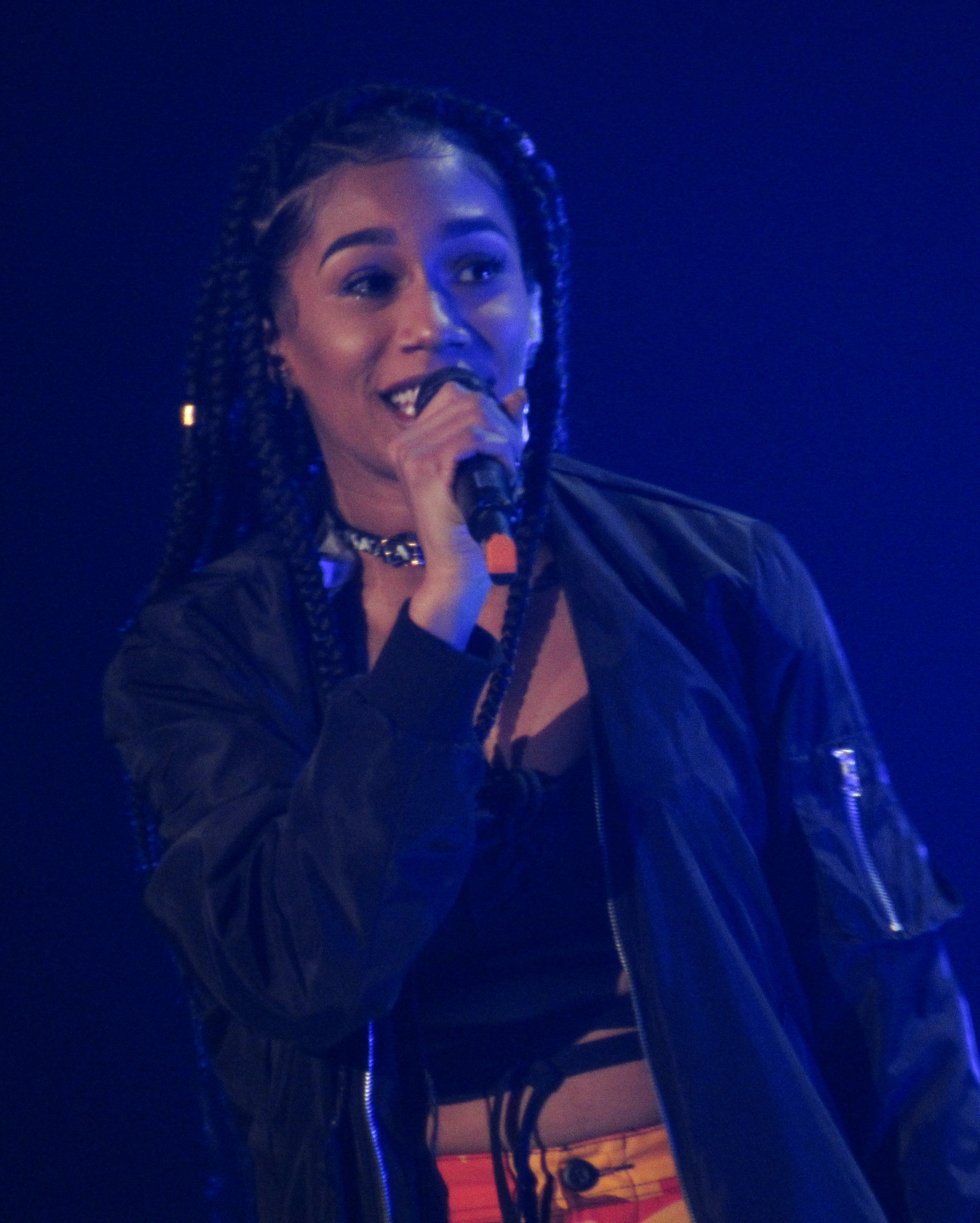
- Bia in 2017

Background information
- Born: Bianca Miquela Landrau; Medford, Massachusetts, U.S.
- Genres: Hip hop; trap
- Occupations: Rapper; singer; songwriter
- Years active: 2013–present
- Labels: I Am Other; RCA; Epic
- Website: officialbia.com

Bianca Miquela Landrau, known professionally as Bia, is an American rapper, singer, and songwriter who debuted on the Oxygen reality television series Sisterhood of Hip Hop. She signed to Pharrell Williams' I Am Other record label, in partnership with RCA Records in 2014. Her first EP, Nice Girls Finish Last: Cuidado, was released in 2018. She is best recognized for featuring on the 2016 single "Safari" by J Balvin and "Best on Earth" by Russ in 2019. In early 2020, Bia signed a new record deal with Epic Records, releasing her second EP, For Certain, on December 11, 2020. The EP spawned the single "Whole Lotta Money", which later was released as a remix featuring Nicki Minaj and reached the top 20 of the Billboard Hot 100.

== Early life ==
Landrau was born in Medford, Massachusetts. She is of Puerto Rican and Italian descent. In an interview with Oxygen's website, she spoke about wanting to become a rapper at a young age after attending studio sessions with rappers and helping them record. Landrau attended Bunker Hill Community College briefly, but after realizing it did not suit her, she dropped out and began bartending to pay for studio time. She moved to Los Angeles, California, full time in 2017.

== Career ==
=== 2014–2015: Career beginnings and #CholaSeason ===
Bia was initially discovered by rapper Fam-Lay through YouTube and who later introduced her to Pharrell. Bia starred on the first two seasons of the Oxygen reality television series Sisterhood of Hip Hop. In 2014, she signed to the I Am Other music label as part of a collaboration with RCA Records and began working with T.I as well as singers Jennifer Hudson and Usher. Later that year, Bia released a mixtape entitled #CholaSeason. In an interview with radio station Hot 97's morning show Ebro in the Morning in September 2015, she revealed that she would not return for season 3 of Sisterhood of Hip Hop.

=== 2016–2018: Touring and Nice Girls Finish Last: Cuidado ===
Bia served as the opening act for Pusha T's Darkest Before the Dawn Tour in March and April 2016. The next month, Bia alongside Victoria Monét, were the main support acts for the European leg of Ariana Grande's Dangerous Woman Tour. Bia also opened for select dates during the North American leg. Bia was featured on J Balvin's song "Safari", released as a single in May 2016. The track topped the charts in Mexico and Spain as well as peaking at No. 3 on the US Latin Charts.

In 2016, Bia released the singles "Whip It" and "Gucci Comin' Home". These singles were followed by "Badside" and "Fungshway", which were both released in 2017. All four singles were intended to be included on Bia's then-upcoming debut EP titled Trap Vogue, to be followed by her debut album. Bia described the project as "high energy with Latin elements mixed in". She also revealed that the song "Esta Noche" featuring Grande, which was performed during Bia's opening set for the Dangerous Woman Tour, would be included on the project. Bia eventually scrapped the project in favor of new material.

Bia was featured on the track "Miami", from Kali Uchis' debut album Isolation, which was released on April 6, 2018. Victoria Monét released a remix of her song "Freak", featuring Bia on July 10, 2018. A visual was released including a shortened version of the track just containing Bia's verse and a chorus, while the full version of the song appeared on streaming platforms. On September 21, 2018, Bia released her debut EP Nice Girls Finish Last: Cuidado, which included the single "Hollywood", as well as collaborations with Uchis and Kodak Black.

=== 2019–present: Departure from RCA and For Certain ===
In 2019, Bia split from RCA Records, citing the label was preventing her from releasing music. She released her first independent song "One Minute Warning" in August. "Best on Earth", a collaboration with rapper and singer Russ, was released on October 17, 2019. Singer Rihanna posted on her social media that it was her new favorite song, which led to an internet trend #BestOnEarthChallenge and a spike in popularity to the song. The song eventually peaked at number 46 on the Billboard Hot 100, becoming Bia's first entry on the chart and was certified Platinum by the RIAA for selling over one million units in the United States.

In early 2020, Bia resigned with Sony under Epic Records and released two singles, "Free BIA (1st Day Out)" and "Cover Girl". "Cover Girl" was serviced to Urban and Rhythmic radio stations on April 14. In September 2020, Bia released the single "Same Hands" featuring American rapper Lil Durk. Another single, "Skate", was released in November 2020, alongside a music video. A reworked version of the song, entitled the "NHL Mix", was later used as the theme song for the 2021 Stanley Cup playoffs. All songs are included on Bia's second EP, titled For Certain, which was released on December 11, 2020, through Epic Records. A music video for the song "Whole Lotta Money" was released on April 8, 2021. Following viral success on the social media platform TikTok, the song was serviced to Rhythmic radio on May 18, 2021, becoming the fifth single from the EP. A remix featuring Nicki Minaj was released on July 9, 2021, and caused the song to reach a peak of number 16 on the Billboard Hot 100, becoming Bia's highest-charting song. On September 24, she released the single "Besito" featuring G Herbo. Alongside the release, Bia announced the deluxe edition of For Certain which will be released on October 22, 2021. Also in 2021, Bia appeared as feature on Iggy Azalea's song "Is That Right" from her final album The End of an Era.

In an interview with Ladygunn, Bia revealed she is working on an R&B project titled R&BIA.

On February 5, 2022, Bia launched her own make-up line Beauty for Certain. On April 8, 2022, Bia released a song with rapper J. Cole called "London". She received a BET Hip Hop Awards Sweet 16: Best Featured Verse nomination for her appearance on the song. On September 9, 2022, Bia featured on the remix to Nicki Minaj's song "Super Freaky Girl" entitled the "Queen Mix" alongside JT from City Girls, Katie Got Bandz, Akbar V, and Maliibu Miitch. In September 2022, Bia also featured on German rapper Luciano's track "Bamba". On March 3, 2023, Bia released a song titled "Sixteen". On March 24, 2023, Bia released a song featuring American record producer Timbaland titled "I'm That Bitch".

In an interview on Bootleg Kev, Bia announced that she has completed her debut album. She revealed that she has decided the name of her upcoming album and the cover art is ready while also further revealing that "I'm That Bitch" and "London" will be on the tracklist of her upcoming album.

On June 1, 2024, following what appeared to be a diss aimed at Bia in the remix to GloRilla and Megan Thee Stallion’s "Wanna Be", Bia had previewed a new diss track targeting Cardi B.

== Artistry ==
Bia has cited American rapper Jay-Z, American singer Selena, and fellow rappers Bankroll Fresh, 21 Savage, Nicki Minaj, Foxy Brown, M.I.A., and Blac Youngsta as her biggest influences, as well as Aaliyah and Rihanna as her personal muses. Bia stated that she has never connected with an artist the way she has connected with Rihanna.

== Filmography ==
=== Television ===
| Year | Title | Role |
|---|---|---|
| 2014–2015 | Sisterhood of Hip Hop | Herself |

== Awards and nominations ==
| Award | Year | Nominee | Category | Result | Ref. |
|---|---|---|---|---|---|
| BET Hip Hop Awards | 2020 | "Best on Earth" | Sweet 16: Best Featured Verse | Nominated | |
| BET Hip Hop Awards | 2021 | “Whole Lotta Money” | Song of the Year | Nominated | |
| BET Hip Hop Awards | 2021 | “Whole Lotta Money” | Best Collaboration | Nominated | |
| BET Hip Hop Awards | 2022 | "London" | Best Hip Hop Video | Nominated | |
| Boston Music Awards | 2020 | Herself | Artist of the Year | Won | |
| Boston Music Awards | 2020 | Herself | Hip Hop Artist of the Year | Won | |
| Boston Music Awards | 2021 | Herself | Artist of the Year | Won | |
| Boston Music Awards | 2021 | For Certain | Album of the Year (1 million+ streams) | Won | |
| Boston Music Awards | 2021 | "Whole Lotta Money" | Song of the Year (1 million+ streams) | Won | |
| Boston Music Awards | 2021 | Herself | Hip hop Artist of the Year | Won | |
| iHeartRadio Music Awards | 2022 | Herself | New Best Hip hop Artist | Nominated | |
| Latin American Music Awards | 2017 | "Safari" | Favorite Urban Song | Nominated | |
| Trending: VMAs | 2021 | "Whole Lotta Money" | Best Breakthrough Song | Nominated | |

== Tours ==
=== Appearances ===
- Nicki Minaj – Pink Friday 2 World Tour (2024)

=== Supporting ===
- Pusha T – Darkest Before the Dawn Tour (2016)
- Ariana Grande – Dangerous Woman Tour (2017)
- Don Toliver – Life of a Don Tour (2021)

== Discography ==
=== Studio albums ===
List of studio albums, with selected details
| Title | Studio album details |
|---|---|
| Bianca | Released: October 10, 2025; Label: Epic; Format: CD, digital download, streaming |

=== Extended plays ===
List of extended plays, with selected details, chart positions, and sales
| Title | Extended play details | Peak chart positions | |
| Title | Extended play details | US | US R&B/HH |
|---|---|---|---|
| Nice Girls Finish Last: Cuidado | Released: September 21, 2018; Label: RCA; Format: Digital download, streaming | — | — |
| For Certain | Released: December 11, 2020; Label: Epic; Format: CD, digital download, streaming | 64 | 39 |
| Really Her | Released: July 28, 2023; Label: Epic; Format: digital download, streaming | — | — |

=== Mixtapes ===
List of mixtapes, with selected details
| Title | Details |
|---|---|
| #CholaSeason | Released: May 14, 2014; Label: I Am Other; Format: Digital download |

=== Singles ===
==== As lead artist ====
List of singles as lead artist, with selected chart positions
| Title | Year | Peak chart positions | | | | | | | | | | Certifications | Album |
| Title | Year | US | US R&B /HH | US Rap | US Main. R&B/HH | US Rhy. | US R&B/HH Air. | CAN | NZ Hot | UK | WW | Certifications | Album |
|---|---|---|---|---|---|---|---|---|---|---|---|---|---|
| "Whip It" | 2016 | — | — | — | — | — | — | — | — | — | — | | Non-album single |
| "Hollywood" | 2018 | — | — | — | — | — | — | — | — | — | — | | Nice Girls Finish Last: Cuidado |
| "Free Bia (1st Day Out)" | 2020 | — | — | — | — | — | — | — | — | — | — | | For Certain |
| "Cover Girl" | 2020 | — | — | — | 35 | — | 49 | — | — | — | — | | For Certain |
| "Same Hands" (featuring Lil Durk) | 2020 | — | — | — | — | — | — | — | — | — | — | | For Certain |
| "Skate" | 2020 | — | — | — | — | — | — | — | — | — | — | | For Certain |
| "Whole Lotta Money" (solo or remix featuring Nicki Minaj) | 2021 | 16 | 6 | 4 | 4 | 11 | 5 | 42 | 11 | — | 32 | RIAA: 2× Platinum | For Certain |
| "Besito" (featuring G Herbo) | 2021 | — | — | — | 35 | 33 | 45 | — | — | — | — | | For Certain |
| "Can't Touch This" | 2021 | — | — | — | — | — | — | — | — | — | — | | For Certain |
| "London" (featuring J. Cole) | 2022 | 62 | 20 | 16 | 36 | 31 | — | 55 | 6 | 79 | 130 | | Really Her |
| "Sixteen" | 2023 | — | — | — | — | — | — | — | — | — | — | | Non-album single |
| "I'm That Bitch" (with Timbaland) | 2023 | — | — | — | 29 | 18 | 40 | — | — | — | — | | Really Her |
| "Both" (with Tiësto featuring 21 Savage) | 2023 | — | — | — | — | 35 | — | — | — | — | — | | Non-album single |
| "Lights Out" (with JID) | 2024 | — | — | — | — | 19 | — | — | — | — | — | | Bianca |
| "Pissed Off" (featuring Lil Yachty) | 2024 | — | — | — | — | — | — | — | — | — | — | | Bianca |
| "We On Go" | 2025 | — | 37 | — | — | — | — | — | — | — | — | | Bianca |
| "Rumors" (with Imanbek) | 2025 | — | — | — | — | — | — | — | — | — | — | | Non-album single |
| "One Thing" | 2025 | — | — | — | — | — | — | — | — | — | — | | Bianca |
| "Birthday Behavior" | 2025 | — | — | — | — | — | — | — | — | — | — | | Bianca |
| "Dade" | 2025 | — | — | — | — | — | — | — | — | — | — | | Bianca |
| "Hard Way" (featuring Becky G) | 2025 | — | — | — | — | 32 | — | — | — | — | — | | Bianca |
"—" denotes a recording that did not chart or was not released.

==== As featured artist ====
List of singles as featured artist, with selected chart positions
| Title | Year | Peak chart positions | | | | | | | | | | Certifications | Album |
| Title | Year | US | US R&B /HH | US Latin | AUT | COL | GER | MEX | NZ Hot | SPA | SWI | Certifications | Album |
|---|---|---|---|---|---|---|---|---|---|---|---|---|---|
| "Safari" (J Balvin featuring Pharrell Williams, Bia & Sky) | 2016 | — (Note: "Safari" did not enter the Billboard Hot 100, but peaked at number seven on the Bubbling Under Hot 100 chart.) | — | 3 | — | 5 | — | 1 | — | 1 | 76 | AMPROFON: 2× Platinum; FIMI: 2× Platinum; PROMUSICAE: 4× Platinum | Energia |
| "Piñata" (Vice featuring Bia, Kap G & Justin Quiles) | 2017 | — | — | — | — | — | — | — | — | — | — | | Non-album singles |
| "Freak" (Remix) (Victoria Monét featuring Bia) | 2018 | — | — | — | — | — | — | — | — | — | — | | Non-album singles |
| "Facts" (Chantel Jeffries featuring YG, Rich The Kid, and Bia) | 2019 | — | — | — | — | — | — | — | — | — | — | | Non-album singles |
| "Best on Earth" (Russ featuring Bia) | 2019 | 46 | 22 | — | — | — | — | — | 4 | — | — | RIAA: Platinum | Shake the Snow Globe |
| "Perfect (Remix)" (Cousin Stizz featuring Doja Cat and Bia) | 2020 | — | — | — | — | — | — | — | — | — | — | | Non-album singles |
| "Remember Me" (Dove Cameron featuring Bia) | 2020 | — | — | — | — | — | — | — | — | — | — | | Non-album singles |
| "I Like Dat" (Remix) (T-Pain featuring Bia and Kehlani) | 2021 | — | — | — | — | — | — | — | — | — | — | | Non-album singles |
| "Trampoline" (David Guetta and Afrojack featuring Missy Elliott, Bia and Doechii) | 2022 | ― | ― | ― | ― | ― | ― | ― | ― | — | — | | Non-album singles |
| "Run" (YG, Tyga and 21 Savage featuring Bia) | 2022 | ― | ― | ― | ― | ― | ― | ― | ― | — | — | | Pray for Me |
| "Bamba" (Luciano featuring Aitch and Bia) | 2022 | ― | ― | ― | 1 | ― | 1 | ― | — | — | 1 | | Majestic |
| "Beach Ball" (Busta Rhymes featuring Bia) | 2023 | — | — | — | — | — | — | — | — | — | — | | Blockbusta |
| "Likka Sto 2" (Lil Blessin and G Herbo featuring Travis Scott and Bia) | 2023 | — | — | — | — | — | — | — | — | — | — | | Non-album single |
"—" denotes a recording that did not chart or was not released.

==== Promotional singles ====
| Title | Year | Album |
|---|---|---|
| "Gucci Comin' Home" | 2016 | Non-album singles |
| "Badside" | 2017 | Non-album singles |
| "Fungshway" | 2017 | Non-album singles |
| "One Minute Warning" | 2019 | Non-album singles |

=== Guest appearances ===
List of non-single guest appearances, with other performing artists, showing year released and album name
| Title | Year | Other artist(s) | Album |
|---|---|---|---|
| "High" | 2015 | Christian Rich, Vince Staples | FW14 |
| "Good Idea" | 2015 | Kid Ink | Summer in the Winter |
| "Miami" | 2018 | Kali Uchis | Isolation |
| "Seashell" | 2018 | Fasscoupe | Hood Mascot |
| "Edible" | 2018 | Kayo Genesis | Bad Sushi |
| "Perfect" | 2019 | Sam Spiegel, Tropkillaz, MC Pikachu | Random Shit from the Internet Era |
| "Labels" | 2020 | Kiana Ledé, Moneybagg Yo | Kiki |
| "Is That Right" | 2021 | Iggy Azalea | The End of an Era |
| "Super Freaky Girl (Queen Mix)" | 2022 | Nicki Minaj | Non-album song |
| "Fine Shyt" | 2025 | DDG | Blame the Chat |
| "Energy" | 2026 | Ava Max | Official FIFA World Cup 2026 Album |
