= Best on Earth =

Song by Russ featuring BIA

Single by Russ featuring Bia

from the album Shake the Snow Globe
- Released: October 17, 2019
- Length: 2:40
- Label: Diemon; Columbia
- Songwriters: Russell Vitale; Matthew Samuels; Jahaan Sweet; Bianca Landrau; Jonathan Smith; Craig Love; Donnell Prince; Jamal Glaze; LaMarquis Jefferson; Lawrence Edwards
- Producers: Boi-1da; Sweet

Russ singles chronology
"Old Days" (2019)	"Best on Earth" (2019)	"Give Up" (2020)

Bia singles chronology
"One Minute Run" (2019)	"Best on Earth" (2019)	"Free Bia (1st Day Out)" (2020)

Music video
- "Best on Earth" on YouTube

"Best on Earth" (stylized in all caps) is a song by American rapper Russ featuring rapper Bia. It was released as the fourth single from Russ's fourteenth studio album Shake the Snow Globe (2020) on October 17, 2019. The song was produced by Boi-1da and Jahaan Sweet, and samples "Some Cut" The Lil Jon produced single by American hip hop group Trillville.

== Music video ==
A music video was released on November 5, 2019. In it, Russ and Bia are at a party with many women twerking and draped in lingerie. "Russ also covers the basement floor in dollar bills, as he sits down to take in the scene and enjoy some hookah."

== Reception ==
On October 18, 2019, Rihanna took to Instagram to post a video of the song with the captions, "thank you @bia and @russ for my new fav song #BestOnEarth". The two rappers both received a cosign from Rihanna, which they expressed appreciation for. On September 29, 2020, Bia's verse from the record received a nomination for the BET Hip Hop Awards in the “Sweet 16: Best Featured Verse” category. Russ received his first music industry award for the single at the 2021 BMI R&B/Hip-Hop Awards.

== Chart performance ==
"Best on Earth" debuted at number 100 on the US Billboard Hot 100 chart, on the week of December 21, 2019. The song became Russ' third and Bia's first to appear on the chart. After climbing the chart for three months, the song reached its peak at number 46 on the week of March 28, 2020. On May 13, 2020, the single was certified platinum by the Recording Industry Association of America (RIAA) for combined sales and streaming units of over a million units in the United States. On April 16, 2025, the single was certified 3× Multi-Platinum.

== Charts ==
=== Weekly charts ===
Chart (2019–2020)	Peak position
New Zealand Hot Singles (RMNZ)	4
US Billboard Hot 100	46
US Hot R&B/Hip-Hop Songs (Billboard)	22
US Rhythmic Airplay (Billboard)	1

=== Year-end charts ===
Chart (2020)	Position
US Hot R&B/Hip-Hop Songs (Billboard)	47
US Rhythmic (Billboard)	13

== Certifications ==
Region	Certification	Certified units/sales
Canada (Music Canada)	Gold	40,000^{‡}
New Zealand (RMNZ)	Platinum	30,000^{‡}
United States (RIAA)	3× Platinum	3,000,000^{‡}
^{‡} Sales+streaming figures based on certification alone.
