= Benny the Butcher =

American rapper and songwriter (born 1984)

Benny The Butcher
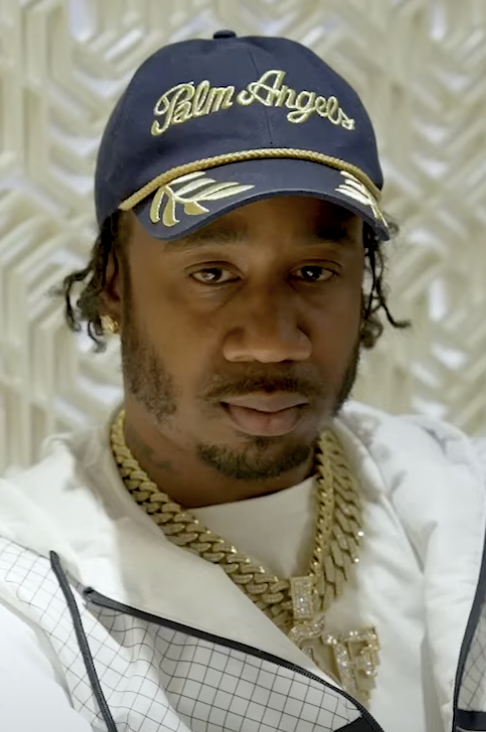
- Pennick in 2023

Background information
- Also known as: 2 Chain Bennymane; B.E.N.N.Y.; The Butcher
- Born: Jeremie Damon Pennick; November 27, 1984 (age 41); Buffalo, New York, U.S.
- Genre: East Coast hip-hop
- Occupations: Rapper; songwriter; record producer; tutor
- Years active: 2004–present
- Labels: 5 to 50; Griselda; Black Soprano Family; Def Jam (former)
- Website: www.bennythebutcher.com

Jeremie Damon Pennick (born November 27, 1984), known professionally as Benny the Butcher, or simply Benny, is an American rapper and songwriter. He came to prominence in 2018 following the release of his debut album, Tana Talk 3. Along with his cousins and fellow rappers Westside Gunn and Conway The Machine, with which he forms the collective Griselda, he is known for his '90s inspired rap songs and is often credited with leading a revival of the so called 'grimy' and 'gritty' hip-hop music, influenced by mafioso and drug dealing themes.

Despite being signed at the age of 15, he continued to engage in drug dealing activities for a significant portion of his early life. Following the death of his brother, Machine Gun Black, Pennick released numerous mixtapes and collaborative albums. His notable and most cited works are the albums Butcher on Steroids, Tana Talk 3, Burden of Proof, Tana Talk 4 and the EP The Plugs I Met.

Pennick's music often centers on his experiences as a young drug dealer in Buffalo, New York, the obstacles and the experiences he encountered. He has been praised by peers and critics for his storytelling ability and choice of sound.

== Early life ==
Pennick was born on November 27, 1984 and was the second-eldest of eight siblings, raised by a single mother. He spent his childhood growing up on Montana Avenue in the city of Buffalo, New York. Pennick started dealing heroin at the age of 14.

== Career ==
=== 2004–2005: First mixtapes ===
Early in his career, Pennick started to work with local Buffalo hip-hop record producer DJ Shay and started to record songs regularly. Pennick released his first mixtape titled Tana Talk in 2004. Pennick notes he printed 5,000 copies of his mixtape and handed them out for free to gain fans. Pennick himself initially commented that he did not have a copy. However, in an interview promoting Tana Talk 3, Pennick hinted that he does have the source files for the mixtape, and would release the mixtape should he feel inclined to in the future.

=== 2005–2013: Shooting of brother and initial mixtapes ===
On October 3, 2006, Pennick's older brother Marchello Lowery, also known as Machine Gun Black, was shot in a drive by shooting on Montana Block, in Buffalo, New York. Pennick was in jail for violating his parole at the time. The death of Lowery impacted Pennick and his cousins profoundly, and has a major influence on the content of their music and lyrics.

=== 2014–2016: Signing to Griselda Records, Black Soprano Family and final projects as Benny ===
In 2014, Westside Gunn founded Griselda Records, through which Benny, Conway The Machine, and Westside Gunn would self-release their own projects. Pennick's music would take a major shift from popular sounds and reused beats from existing artists, as was the trend in the 2000s mixtape period, to more targeted in house production. He adopted the sound pioneered by his cousins, Westside Gunn and Conway the Machine, and developed by the in house producer, Daringer. Pennick appeared on many releases by Griselda Records and started to gain popularity as a regular featured artist. Around the same time Pennick founded the Black Soprano Family, a collective of Buffalo rappers that he was affiliated with. They released the collective mixtape Black Soprano Family on May 11, 2015.

=== 2016–2017: Benny the Butcher and new artistic direction ===
On March 3, 2017, Griselda (as a collective), as well as Pennick's cousins Westside Gunn and Conway the Machine, signed a deal with Eminem's Shady Records, a subsidiary of Interscope. In April 2017, Pennick and his collective Black Soprano Family signed a label deal with Entertainment One Music. While working on his next project and debut album, Following this, he released the EP Tommy Devitos Breakfast on October 28, 2017.

That same year, on November 17, 2017, Pennick, as Benny the Butcher, released the mixtape Butcher On Steroids, in collaboration with DJ Green Lantern. This was part of a series of mixtapes that DJ Green Lantern was creating with Griselda Records members, having made similar 'Steroids' mixtapes with Conway The Machine and Westside Gunn. The mixtape was received with critical acclaim and widely praised by fans and critics who noted Pennick's progression and refined sonic palette.

Capitalizing on the success of Butcher on Steroids, Pennick collaborated with his hometown friend and fellow rapper, 38 Spesh, to release the joint mixtape Stabbed and Shot, officially released on 18 February 2018.

=== 2018–2019: Debut album Tana Talk 3, The Plugs I Met, WWCD and critical acclaim ===
On November 23, 2018, Pennick released his debut studio album Tana Talk 3, produced by The Alchemist and Griselda Records' in house producer Daringer. This would be the third in the installments of Tana Talk projects, named after the block Pennick grew up on, Montana Avenue. The cover is a painting of his deceased older half-brother, MachineGun Black as a baby, and the lyrics to the album would focus heavily on Pennick's feelings on the death of his brother. The album was developed by setting aside suitable songs and beats created during Westside Gunn's, Hitler Wears Hermes 6, recording sessions. Once those recording sessions were complete The Alchemist and Pennick completed recording other songs within two weeks. Critics praised the production and content of the album, saying "There's a certain introspection that guides Benny's lyrics on this song, as he touches on topics ranging from drug trafficking to police racism in the murder of Eric Garner". HipHopDX claimed that "Benny the Butcher crafts his magnus opus with Tana Talk 3", writing that "the project is all the things you love about everything Griselda ever drops, but with this extra layer of sonic consistency crafted by the two upper-echelon grimy beatsmiths".

June 21, 2019 marked the release of his fourth extended play, The Plugs I Met, which included guest appearances from Black Thought, Pusha T, 38 Spesh, Jadakiss, and Conway the Machine. On August 6, it was announced that Pennick signed a management deal with Roc Nation. Writing about Pennick's 2019 project, Dan-O of Freemusicempire said "Benny The Butcher did an EP with the greatest guest list of the year. Right after the intro skit you hear him next to Black Thought. Next song Jadakiss, and closing out the project with Pusha T's second best guest appearance of 2019 on 18 Wheeler. No matter who was with him Benny blew like Sonny Rollins on the Sax, whether Conway the Machine or Eminem was coming on next ... it didn't matter. The Butcher has a gift and no fear."

=== 2020–present: Commercial success and Def Jam deal ===
On August 27, 2020, Pennick announced in an interview with Adam22 for No Jumper that he would release an album under eOne called Burden of Proof between late September and early October. The album was eventually released on October 16 to rave reviews.

On March 19, 2021, Pennick released the sequel to The Plugs I Met EP, with a collaboration EP with Harry Fraud, named The Plugs I Met 2. This EP received widespread critical acclaim from various music critics.

On November 12, 2021, he officially signed a record deal with Def Jam Recordings for upcoming releases. The announcement was made by American rapper Snoop Dogg, a creative consultant for the label, on Joe Rogan's podcast The Joe Rogan Experience a week after Pennick was featured on Snoop Dogg's single "Murder Music" alongside Jadakiss and Busta Rhymes.

On January 28, 2022, Benny released the single, "Johnny P's Caddy", with rapper J. Cole. The song is the lead single from Benny's album, Tana Talk 4, which he has labeled "album of the year". Tana Talk 4 was eventually released on March 11 to generally favorable reviews.

Two years following the release of Tana Talk 4, Benny made his major label debut under Def Jam on January 26, 2024, with the release of his fourth full-length studio album, Everybody Can't Go. The album included guest appearances from Armani Caesar, Babyface Ray, Conway the Machine, Jadakiss, Kyle Banks, Lil Wayne, Peezy, Rick Hyde, Snoop Dogg, Stove God Cooks, and Westside Gunn. The album was solely produced by The Alchemist and Hit-Boy, with Corbett providing additional production on the title track.

In June 2024, Benny's "Big Dog" feat. Lil Wayne was nominated for the Hollywood Independent Music Awards in the Adult Contemporary Hip Hop category.

In 2025, Benny released STABBED & SHOT 2 alongside 38 Spesh and his fifth studio album Excelsior.

== Personal life ==
In November 2020, in Houston, Texas, Pennick was shot in the leg during an attempted robbery in a Walmart parking lot.

On October 27, 2021, Pennick cancelled a concert at Detroit's Saint Andrew's Hall after he was hospitalized with asthma, a condition he has both rapped about and spoken about in interviews. In a verified annotation on Genius's lyric page for his song "Where Would I Go" off the 2020 album Burden of Proof, he wrote he has lived with asthma for 25 years and the condition forces him to go to the emergency room two or three times a year: "I got to be careful, I got to make sure I wear my mask, I got to make sure I'm taking my medicine. Running the streets and being in and out of prison, it's probably something I haven't done the best of. But being older, that's something that I take care of".

Pennick has been charged with four felonies throughout his life.

He was embroiled in a two-year feud with Indiana rapper Freddie Gibbs. In August 2022, after trading insults with Pennick over social media for several months, Freddie Gibbs was beat up by a large mob of people while on a date at a Dinosaur BBQ location in Buffalo, New York. TMZ acquired footage of the brawl, leading the video to go viral. Benny seemed to confirm his involvement in the incident, posting images on social media of a chain allegedly taken from Gibbs during the fight. In a January 2024 interview with The Breakfast Club, Benny stated that the beef between the two rappers was over, but that he was not interested in making amends with Gibbs.

He supported Donald Trump's 2024 presidential campaign.

== Discography ==
- Tana Talk 3 (2018)
- Burden of Proof (2020)
- Tana Talk 4 (2022)
- Everybody Can't Go (2024)

== Filmography ==
Year	Title	Role	Notes
2021	Conflicted	Nick	Film Debut
