= Russ (rapper) =

American rapper, singer, songwriter, record producer, author, and actor

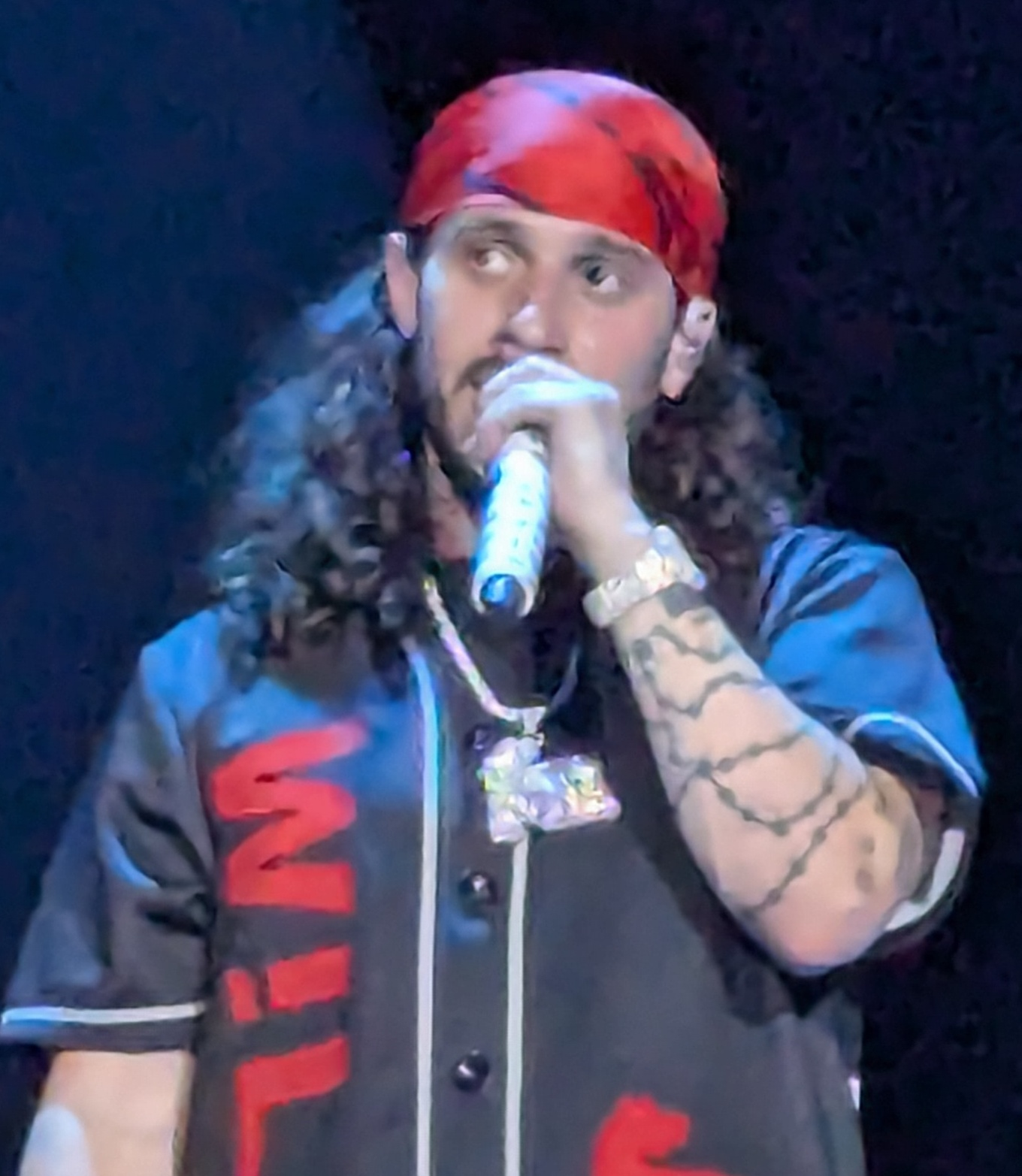
- Russ performing in 2025

Background information
- Born: Russell James Vitale; September 26, 1992 (age 33); Secaucus, New Jersey, U.S.
- Origin: Atlanta, Georgia, U.S.
- Genres: Alternative hip-hop; R&B
- Occupations: Rapper; singer; songwriter; record producer; author; actor
- Works: Russ discography
- Years active: 2007–present
- Labels: Diemon; Columbia (2017–2020)
- Website: www.russworld.com

Russell James Vitale (born September 26, 1992), known mononymously as Russ, is an American rapper, singer, songwriter, record producer, author, and actor. Along with his solo career, he is a member of the Atlanta-based hip hop collective Diemon.

After eleven self-released albums, Vitale partnered with Columbia Records to release his twelfth studio album and major label debut, There's Really a Wolf (2017). A critical and commercial success, the album received platinum certification by the Recording Industry Association of America (RIAA) and spawned his first Billboard Hot 100 entries: "What They Want" and "Losin Control." His thirteenth and fourteenth albums, Zoo (2018) and Shake the Snow Globe (2020), both peaked at number four on the Billboard 200; the latter spawned the top 50-single, "Best on Earth" (featuring Bia).

Outside of recording, Vitale published his first book, It's All In Your Head, in 2019. In 2024, he made his acting debut in the thriller film, Trap.

== Early life ==
Russell James Vitale was born on September 26, 1992, in Secaucus, New Jersey. Vitale was born into an American family with Sicilian ancestry, which included him and three other siblings. He lived in North Carolina and Kentucky in his childhood due to his father having to constantly relocate due to his career, before his family found a permanent home during his late teenage years in Atlanta, Georgia. Vitale was taught to play guitar by his father, and over the years gradually learned how to play several instruments. He started writing raps in his notebook at 7 years old. He started making beats when he was 14 and was initially producing with his friend Bugus. He recorded his first song at 18 years old and continued making beats and producing songs in the basement of Colm Dillane's KidSuper.

== Career ==
In 2011, Russ, alongside friend and fellow rapper Bugus, appeared on MTV after Bugus' song "El Jefe" gained traction. After his short enrollment in Kennesaw State University, Russ co-founded his own collective and label, Diemon, with Bugus and others. In a 2012 article on Jenesis Magazine, Russ was described as an in-house producer for Diemon.

From December 2011 to August 2014, Russ released 11 albums and 87 singles consecutively; all free of charge. Despite this, his music had not gained the attention that he wanted, so he began to release a song every week on SoundCloud for almost three years. Two of these songs, "What They Want" and "Losin Control", entered the Billboard Hot 100, peaking at numbers 83 and 62, respectively.

After signing a partnership with Columbia Records, Russ released his twelfth studio album, There's Really a Wolf, on May 5, 2017; it debuted at number 7 on the US Billboard 200 and number four on the US Top R&B/Hip-Hop Albums charts. On April 18, 2018, the album was certified platinum by the Recording Industry Association of America (RIAA) for combined sales and album-equivalent units of over 1,000,000 units in the United States. Prior to releasing his album, Russ announced on his Twitter account that he would be headlining his tour, The Wake Up Tour, from May 16 to August 5, 2017.

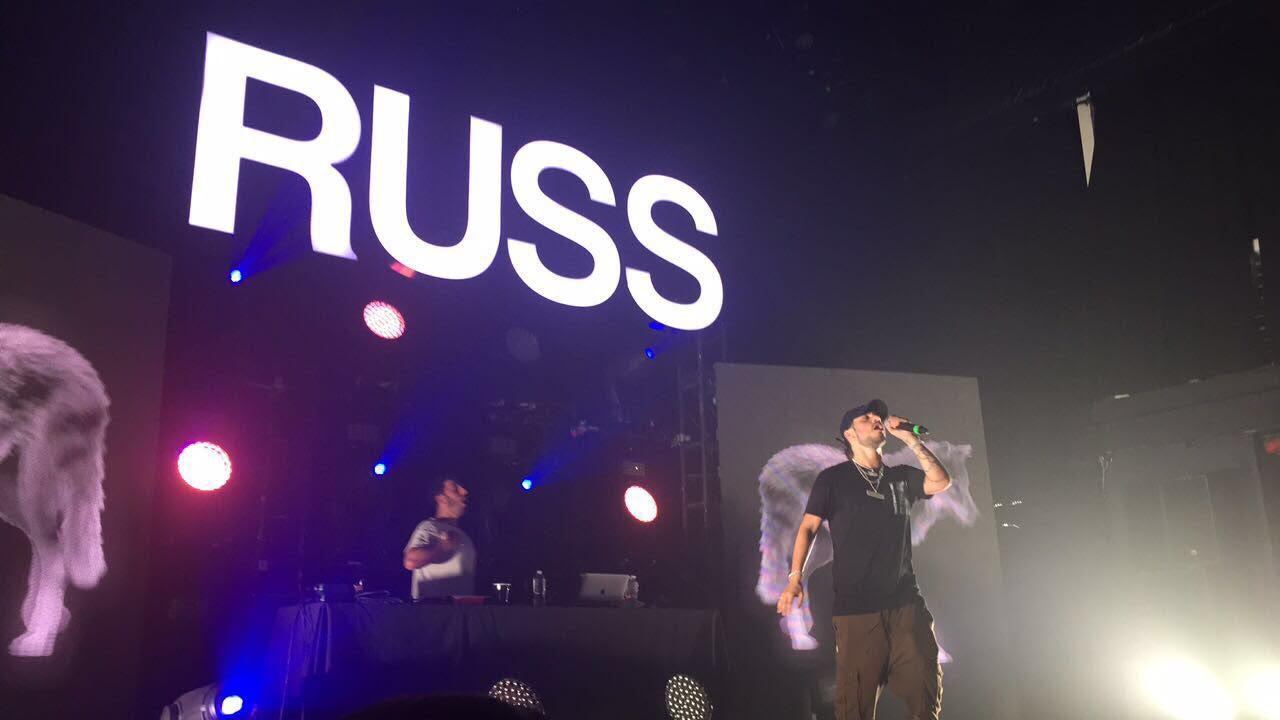
Russ performing in 2017

Russ released his thirteenth studio album, Zoo, on September 7, 2018, which peaked at number 4 on the Billboard 200. On November 12, 2019, Russ published his first book, It's All in Your Head. On January 31, 2020, he released his fourteenth studio album, Shake the Snow Globe, on Russ My Way Inc. and Columbia Records. It peaked at number 4 on the US Billboard 200.

The first book authored by Russ, It's All in Your Head, was published in 2019 and went on to be a bestseller.

On June 30, 2020, Russ announced that he completed his deal with Columbia Records and is now an independent artist. On November 17, 2020, he released an EP titled Chomp. It features guest appearances from Black Thought, Busta Rhymes, Benny the Butcher, and Ab-Soul, among others.

On November 18, 2021, Russ announced a new EP, Chomp 2, as the sequel to last year's Chomp. The project was released on December 8, 2021, under Russ My Way Inc.

On August 18, 2023, Russ released the album Santiago. It went on to peak at 12 on the Billboard 200 album chart.

On January 10, 2024, he published the sequel to his first book It Was You All Along. Later that year, he made his film debut, appearing as Parker Wayne in the M. Night Shyamalan thriller, Trap.

== Musical style and influences ==
Russ's early inspirations were G-Unit, 50 Cent, and Eminem. He produced beats for around six years before he attempted to record himself rapping. Russ is known for his songs being produced, mixed, mastered, engineered, written, and performed by himself. Most of his songs contain hip hop and R&B elements, while combining rapping and singing on the hook. His style has been described by Uproxx as a "raspy, hardbody rap flow, and lilting, almost drunken singing voice".

== Controversy ==
On September 11, 2017, after a show, Russ tweeted a picture depicting him in a shirt with writing on it that said: "How much xans and lean do you have to do before you realize you're a fucking loser". The tweet caused controversy, and led to numerous responses from other music artists. Late Chicago rapper Fredo Santana responded to the tweet, stating: "Until I can stop thinking bout my dead homies an the trauma I been thru in my life that's when I'll stop".

Following the controversy, the phrase "fuck Russ" became a commonly referenced phrase and meme. On June 6, 2018, after rappers Lil Pump and J. Cole settled their issues in an interview, Lil Pump tweeted "ME & J COLE COOL NOW SO NOW ITS FUCK RUSS".

== Personal life ==
Russ has two different eye colors, a condition known as heterochromia; his left eye is dark brown, and his right is light brown.

== Discography ==
- Velvet (2011)
- Apollo 13 (2012)
- 5280 (2012)
- Vacation (2012)
- Straight From Limbo (2013)
- The Edge (2013)
- Color Blind (2013)
- Pink Elephant (2014)
- Brain Dead (2014)
- Silence (2014)
- How to Rob (2014)
- There's Really a Wolf (2017)
- Zoo (2018)
- Shake the Snow Globe (2020)
- Chomp 2 (2021)
- Chomp 2.5 (2023)
- Santiago (2023)
- W!LD (2025)

== Filmography ==
Year	Title	Role	Notes
2024	Trap	Parker Wayne	
2026	Don't Move	Ricky Vargas	

== Awards and nominations ==
Year	Award	Category	Result
2017	Woodie Awards	Woodie to Watch	Nominated
2025	Billboard's Indie Power Players	Indie Trailblazer	Honored
