= Saint Michael (EP) =

EP by Trippie Redd
- Released: 10 November 2023
- Genres: hip-hop; Emo rap
- Length: 17:50
- Label: 10K Projects
- Producers: A Lau; Bobby Raps; Cash Cobain; Emerald; FLOWRENCY; g06; Igor Mamet; James Bentley; Lido; Matty; Oddwin; Pi'erre Bourne; TĀLĀ; Theevoni; Trippie Redd; T'Rue; Zerum

Trippie Redd chronology
A Love Letter to You 5 (2023)	Saint Michael (2023)	Saint Michael V2 (2023)

Saint Michael is the tenth extended play by American rapper Trippie Redd, released on 10 November 2023 through 10K Projects. It was his third release of 2023. Like Redd's ninth EP First Draft (2022), the project was only made available by streaming. It features a sole guest appearance by Banks. Production was handled primarily by Igor Mamet, with other contributions coming from Cash Cobain, Pi'erre Bourne, and Bobby Raps, among others.

Saint Michael was received positively by listeners, and through streaming debuted at number 161 on the US Billboard 200 chart. On 24 November 2023, Redd released the reissued deluxe version of the project, Saint Michael V2, adding guest appearances from 9lives, YTB Fatt, and K Suave.

== Background and promotion ==
In November 2023, Trippie Redd announced the release of the project on Instagram, calling it a surprise album composed of "7 songs now 7 songs later". He added: "I’d like to thank you all for supporting me let’s take a moment to space our minds and rage through depression to rid the negativity 🌸 [sic]". The song "Pepe Lit" was soon replaced by "Saint Michael Mayers" on the tracklist. "Pepe Lit" later appeared on Saint Michael V2 before being removed.

On November 10, Redd announced the birth of his son Saint Michael White, explaining the project's title. Redd explained why he cancelled his upcoming tour, saying: "I'm dropping a project named Saint Michael, right? What if I was to tell you that's my son's name and I canceled tour [sic] because I had to deliver my son?" However, in a vlog posted by DDG on April 2 2024, Redd revealed that he took a DNA test on advice from his mother and discovered that the child was not his. Redd added: "I feel like all the things I was going through during that time was like, really fucking with me ... [sic] That's why I couldn't go on tour, or like, couldn't do shows and shit. I couldn't really get in my spunk, and feel good and shit. It was a lot of shit going on. Just a lot of confusion. I mean, it's life. A lot of shit just happens. Maybe it happened for a reason."

The cover art depicts "Trippie breaking free from a tangle of heavy chains."

== Songs ==
The first song, "Pray 4 Us", was recorded in August 2023. It samples "I Call Your Name" (Switch II, 1979) by Switch. Trippie Redd first previewed the song on 8 August via Instagram, writing: "I made this the other night comment 1400 and who u think I should put on it ! Let’s go album on the 11th 💋🎈 [sic]". Nonetheless, Redd ultimately opted to keep the song solo. The official music video for the song was published on November 10, 2023. The second track, "Van Cleef Island", samples "Neguse" (Neguse, 2013) by Aya Suzaki. The tentative song name "Van Cleef" was initially leaked by Redd's associate and producer ItsNotHarold on September 20, 2023, before the song itself leaked on October 15. Lavender Alexandria of HotNewHipHop called "Van Cleef Island" a "fan-favorite" track. The next song, "1716 Osage", samples "Rock Bottom" (2008) by Pleasure P and Lil Wayne. The song marks Redd's debut as a producer. The title refers to the Osage Nation, a federally recognized Native American tribe in Oklahoma. Lyrically, Redd makes reference to YoungBoy Never Broke Again, Nipsey Hussle, and proclaims that "Ever since I lost my damn brother, I been goin' hard". The music video for the song was released on December 8, 2023.

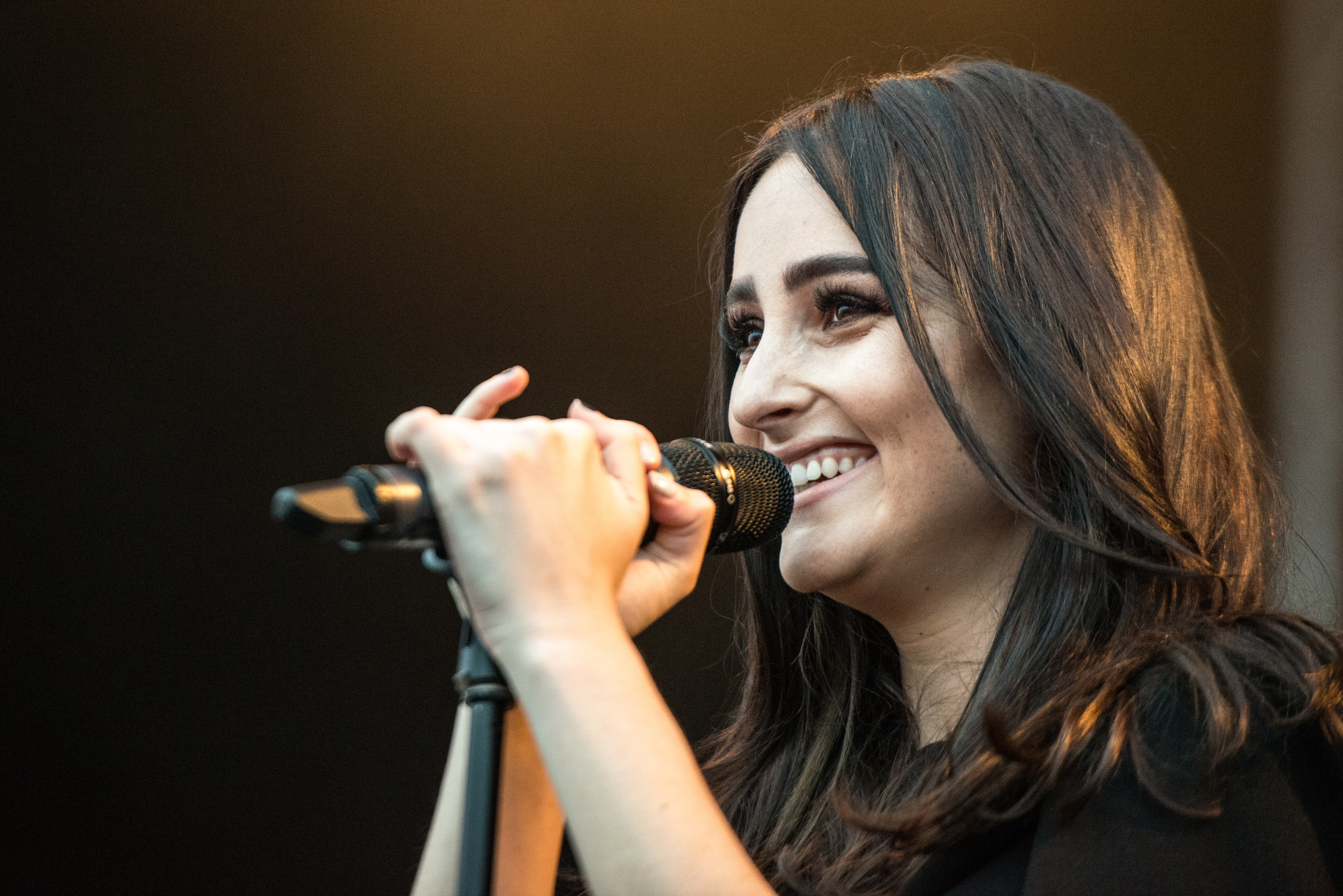
American singer Banks, pictured in 2014, is the only feature on Saint Michael.

The fourth track, "Ok, Cool", was originally intended to be on Redd's fifth album Mansion Musik, but did not make the final cut. The music video was released on December 1, 2023. In November 2025, Apple Inc. used the song for a commercial advertising the iPhone 17 Pro. "7am in Ohio", also co-produced by Redd, is the project's fifth song. The title draws inspiration from Drake’s 'timestamp series'. An accompanying music video was released on November 13, 2023. The next track, "Yo Pi'erre Slime", was produced by the eponymous Pi'erre Bourne alone. Redd first previewed the song on October 5, 2023, and then posted a full snippet to Instagram on October 24, 2023. The final song, "Saint Michael Mayers", contains the album's sole feature, Banks, by means of sampling her track "Misunderstood" (Serpentina, 2022). Lyrically, Redd disses his enemies on the song.

== Critical reception ==
Professional ratings
Review scores
Source	Rating
HotNewHipHop	'VERY HOTTTTT'

Hayley Hynes of HotNewHipHop wrote that Saint Michael "quickly brought the genre-bending artist tons of praise."

== Commercial performance ==
Saint Michael debuted and peaked at number 161 on the US Billboard 200 chart, earning 8,000 album-equivalent units in its first week.

== Track listing ==
Saint Michael track listing
No.	Title	Writer(s)	Producer(s)	Length
1.	"Pray 4 Us"	Michael Lamar White II; Igor Mamet	Igor Mamet; James Bentley; Cash Cobain	2:59
2.	"Van Cleef Island"	White; Mamet	Oddwin	2:31
3.	"1716 Osage"	White; Mamet	Igor Mamet; T'Rue; Theevoni; Trippie Redd; g06	3:12
4.	"Ok, Cool"	White; Mamet	FLOWRENCY	1:56
5.	"7am in Ohio"	White; Mamet	Igor Mamet; Matty; T'Rue; Theevoni; Trippie Redd; Zerum	1:53
6.	"Yo Pi'erre Slime"	White; Mamet	Pi'erre Bourne	2:46
7.	"Saint Michael Mayers" (with Banks)	White; Mamet	A Lau; Bobby Raps; Emerald; Igor Mamet; Lido; TĀLĀ	2:33
Total length:				17:50

Notes

- The track "Pray 4 Us" samples "I Call Your Name" (Switch II, 1979) by Switch
- The track "Van Cleef Island" samples "Neguse" (Neguse, 2013) by Aya Suzaki
- The track "1716 Osage" samples "Rock Bottom" (2008) by Pleasure P and Lil Wayne
- The track "Saint Michael Mayers" samples "Misunderstood" (Serpentina, 2022) by Banks

== Charts ==
Weekly chart performance for Saint Michael
Chart (2023)	Peak position
US Billboard 200	161
