= Jermaine Jackson production discography =

This is the songwriting/production discography of Jermaine Jackson.

== 1970s ==
=== 1971 ===
The Jackson 5 - Goin' Back To Indiana

03. Medley: Walk On / The Love You Save [Live] (Co-Writer, only ''Walk On''; part as ''The Jackson 5'')

=== 1974 ===
M-D-L-T- Willis – What's Your Game? (Single)

01. What's Your Game? (Co-Writer, Co-Producer; part as ''The Jackson 5'')

=== 1975 ===
Michael Masser – The Original Soundtrack Of Mahogany

10. Erucu [Jermaine Jackson] (Co-Writer, Producer)

13. She's The Ideal Girl [Jermaine Jackson] (Co-Writer, Producer)

=== 1976 ===
Thelma Houston - Any Way You Like It

04. Come To Me (Co-Writer)

=== 1977 ===
Jermaine Jackson - Feel The Fire

01. Feel The Fire (Burning From Me) (Co-Writer, Co-Producer)

02. You Need To Be Loved (Co-Writer, Co-Producer)

04. Git Up And Dance (Co-Writer, Co-Producer)

05. I Love You More (co-producer)

08. Got To Get To You Girl (Writer, Co-Producer)

09. Take Time (co-producer)

=== 1978 ===
Finished Touch - Need To Know You Better

06. New Frontiers (Co-Writer)

Switch - Switch

03. I Wanna Be Closer (Writer, Producer)

Jermaine Jackson - Frontiers

01. Let It Ride (Co-Writer, Co-Producer)

02. The Force (Co-Writer, Co-Producer)

04. Je Vous Aime Beaucoup (I Love You) (Co-Writer)

07. Isn't She Lovely (co-producer)

08. Castles Of Sand (co-producer)

=== 1979 ===
Switch - Switch II

04. Calling On All Girls (feat. Jermaine Jackson) (Co-Writer, Producer)

05. Go On Doin' What You Feel (feat. Jermaine Jackson) (Co-Writer, Producer)

== 1980s ==
=== 1980 ===
Switch - Reaching For Tomorrow

05. A Brighter Tomorrow (Interlude) (Co-Writer, Producer)

06. Reaching For Tomorrow (Co-Writer, Producer)

Jermaine Jackson - Let's Get Serious

03. You Got To Hurry Girl (Co-Writer, Producer)

04. We Can Put It Back Together (Co-Writer, Producer)

05. Burnin' Hot (Co-Writer, Producer)

07. Feelin' Free (Co-Writer, Producer)

Jermaine Jackson - Let's Get Serious (Spanish Promo)

03. Corre Nena (Co-Writer, Producer)

04. Lo Podemos Arreglar (Co-Writer, Producer)

Jermaine Jackson - Jermaine

01. The Pieces Fit (Co-Writer, Producer)

02. You Like Me Don't You (Writer, Producer)

03. Little Girl Don't You Worry (Co-Writer, Producer)

04. All Because Of You (Co-Writer, Producer)

05. You've Changed (Interlude) (Writer, Producer)

06. First You Laugh, Then You Cry (Co-Writer, Producer)

09. Beautiful Morning (Co-Writer, Producer)

=== 1981 ===
Switch - Switch V

04. I'll Always Keep (Co-Writer, Producer)

09. Push The Switch (High Energy Switch) (Co-Writer, Producer)

Lovesmith - Lovesmith

01. The Best Of (Co-Writer)

Jermaine Jackson - I Like Your Style

01. I Gotta Hae Ya (Co-Writer, Producer)

02. I'm Just Too Shy (Writer, Producer)

03. You're Givin' Me the Runaround (Co-Writer, Producer)

04. Paradise in Your Eyes (Writer, Producer)

05. Is It Always Gonna Be Like (feat. Rita Coolidge) (Co-Writer, Producer)

06. Signed, Sealed, Delivered I'm Yours (Producer)

07. Maybe Next Time (Writer, Producer)

08. I Can't Take No More (Co-Writer, Producer)

09. It's Still Undone (Writer, Producer)

10. I'm My Brother's Keeper (Co-Writer, Producer)

=== 1982 ===
Jermaine Jackson - Let Me Tickle Your Fancy

01. Let Me Tickle Your Fancy (feat. Devo) (Co-Writer, Co-Producer)

02. Very Special Part (co-producer)

03. Uh, Uh, I Didn't Do It (Co-Writer, Co-Producer)

04. You Belong To Me (feat. Syreeta) (Co-Writer, Co-Producer)

05. You Moved A Mountain (Co-Writer, Co-Producer)

06. Running (Co-Writer, Co-Producer)

07. Messing Around (Writer, Co-Producer)

08. This Time (Co-Writer, Co-Producer)

09. There's A Better Way (Writer, Co-Producer)

10. I Like Your Style (Co-Writer, Co-Producer)

=== 1983 ===
Syreeta - The Spell

01. Forever Is Not Enough (Producer)

02. (Your Are) The Spell (Producer)

03. Freedom (Producer)

04. To Know (feat. Jermaine Jackson) (Producer)

05. Freddie Um Ready (Co-Writer, Producer)

06. Once Love Touches Your Life (feat. Jermaine Jackson) (Co-Writer, Producer)

07. Fall Apart (Producer)

08. The Other Me (Producer)

=== 1984 ===
Jermaine Jackson - Jermaine Jackson

01. Dynamite (Producer)

02. Sweetest Sweetest (feat. Whitney Houston) (Producer)

04. Escape From The Planet Of The Ant Men (feat. The Jacksons) (co-producer)

05. Come To Me (One Way Or Another) (Writer, Producer)

06. Do What You Do (co-producer)

07. Take Good Care Of My Heart (feat. Whitney Houston) (Producer)

09. Oh, Mother (Co-Writer, Producer)

The Jacksons - Victory

07. The Hurt (Co-Producer, part as ''The Jacksons'')

=== 1985 ===
Various Artists - Perfect: Original Soundtrack Album

01. (Closest Thing To) Perfect [Jermaine Jackson] (Co-Writer)

Howard Johnson - The Vision

07. All We Have Is Love (co-producer)

Whitney Houston - Whitney Houston

08. Someone For Me (Producer)

10. Nobody Loves Me Like You Do (feat. Jermaine Jackson) (Producer)

=== 1986 ===
Jermaine Jackson - Precious Moments

01. Do You Remember Me? (Co-Writer)

02. Lonely Won't Leave Me Alone (Co-Writer, Co-Producer)

04. Precious Moments (Co-Writer, Co-Producer)

05. I Think It's Love (Co-Writer)

06. Our Love Story (Co-Writer, Co-Producer)

07. I Hear Heartbeat (co-producer)

08. If You Say My Eyes Are Beautiful (feat. Whitney Houston) ) (co-producer)

09. Voices In The Dark (Co-Writer)

Jermaine Jackson - Do You Remember Me? (Single)

02. Whatcha Doin' (Co-Writer)

=== 1987 ===
Various Artists - Burglar: Original Motion Picture Soundtrack

06. Time Out For The Burglar [The Jacksons] (Co-Producer, part as ''The Jacksons'')

=== 1989 ===
The Jacksons - 2300 Jackson Street

01. Art Of Madness (Co-Writer)

03. Maria (Co-Writer, Producer)

05. 2300 Jackson Street (feat. Michael Jackson, Marlon Jackson, Rebbie Jackson, Janet Jackson, 3T & Jacksons Kids) (Co-Writer, Co-Producer; producer part as ''The Jacksons'')

06. Harley (Co-Writer, Co-Producer; producer part as ''The Jacksons'')

08. Alright With Me (Co-Writer, Co-Producer; producer part as ''The Jacksons'')

09. Play It Up (Co-Writer, Co-Producer; producer part as ''The Jacksons'')

10. Midnight Rendezvous (Co-Writer, Co-Producer; producer part as ''The Jacksons'')

11. If You'd Only Believe (Co-Writer, Co-Producer; producer part as ''The Jacksons'')

The Jacksons - Nothin (That Compares 2 U) (Maxi Single)

03. Please Come Back To Me (Co-Producer, part as ''The Jacksons'')

The Jacksons - 2300 Jackson Street (Single)

02. When I Look At You (Co-Producer, part as ''The Jacksons'')

The Jacksons - Art Of Madness (Single)

02. Keep Her (Co-Writer, Co-Producer; producer part as ''The Jacksons'')

Jermaine Jackson - Don't Take It Personal

06. Two Ships (In The Night) (Co-Writer)

== 1990s ==
=== 1990 ===
Mandy Lee - Mandy Lee

01. Expert (co-producer)

=== 1991 ===
Jermaine Jackson - You Said

01. You Said, You Said (Co-Writer)

02. Rebel (With a Cause) (feat. TLC) (Co-Writer)

07. A Lover's Holiday (Co-Writer)

08. Secrets (Co-Writer)

11. Word To The Badd!! (feat. T-Boz) (Co-Writer)

=== 1992 ===
Various Artists - The Jacksons: An American Dream

08. The Dream Goes On [Jermaine Jackson feat. 3T] (Co-Writer, Co-Producer)

10. Stay With Love [Jermaine Jackson feat. Syreeta] (Co-Writer, Co-Producer)

=== 1996 ===
Jermaine Jackson feat. Lydia - I'm Feeling Good (Right Now) (Maxi Single)

01. I'm Feeling Good (Right Now) (feat. Lydia) (Co-Writer)

== 2000s ==
=== 2003 ===
Johnson & Branson – Packed & Waitin' (Japanese Album)

10. Every Little Thing (Co-Writer)

=== 2004 ===
Al Walser – InternationAL

02. I'm In Love (feat. Jermaine Jackson) (co-producer)

04. Living A Dream (feat. Jermaine Jackson) (co-producer)

05. It's On You (feat. Jermaine Jackson) (co-producer)

10. Jambo (feat. Jermaine Jackson & Jürgen Drews) (co-producer)

14. When I Come Home (feat. Jermaine Jackson) (Co-Writer, co-producer)

== 2010s ==
=== 2010 ===
The Jackson 5 - Live at the Forum (CD 2)

01. Brand New Thing [Live] (Co-Writer, part as ''The Jackson 5'')

=== 2011 ===
Jermaine Jackson - Blame It On The Boogie (Single)

01. Blame It On The Boogie (Producer)

=== 2019 ===
Switch - Reaching For Tomorrow (Expanded Edition)

10. Tahiti Hut (feat. Jermaine Jackson) (Producer)
