= Saint Michael V2 =

EP (reissue) (Note: Released as part of the deluxe reissue of Trippie Redd's tenth EP Saint Michael (2023).) by Trippie Redd
- Released: 24 November 2023
- Genres: Hip-hop; emo rap
- Length: 40:37
- Label: 10K Projects
- Producers: 9lives; A Lau; Bobby Raps; Bosley; Cash Cobain; Dynox; Emerald; FLOWRENCY; g06; Gateway; Igor Mamet; James Bentley; Lido; Losoe; Matty; Mo Beats; Oddwin; PerDu; Pi'erre Bourne; Pirate1Pirate; Safe; Sharkboy; Soundraw; Splited Stupid; TĀLĀ; Theevoni; Trippie Redd; T'Rue; UK24; WhatsWrongChase; Young Yanabu; Zerum

Trippie Redd chronology
Saint Michael (2023)	Saint Michael V2 (2023)	Genre: Sadboy (2024)

Saint Michael V2 is the second reissued deluxe studio album by American rapper Trippie Redd, released on 23 November 2023 through 10K Projects. It was his fourth release of 2023, and serves as the continuation to Saint Michael, which is included in the track listing. Like Saint Michael, the project was only made available by streaming. It features new guest appearances by 9lives, YTB Fatt, and K Suave, and retains another guest appearance from Banks. Production for Saint Michael V2 was handled principally by Igor Mamet, with other contributions coming from Losoe, 9lives, and Bobby Raps, among others.

== Background and promotion ==
In November 2023, before the release of Saint Michael, Trippie Redd announced on Instagram that he would drop "7 songs now 7 songs later [sic]". He dropped seven songs in Saint Michael, but later decided to release ten more in Saint Michael V2. The album served as his final one in a $30,000,000 deal with 10K Projects. The track "Mrs. Tonya" was originally due to be released as part of the original track-list, but failed to make the final cut. Following the project’s release, both "Pepe Lit" and "Skeletons" were removed from it.

== Songs ==
=== Saint Michael V2 ===
The first track of the deluxe reissue, "#RBDG", sees Trippie Redd discuss his sexual experiences. The song's title stands for 'Rich Baby Daddy Gang'. The next song, "Popular", produced by 9lives, was initially previewed on November 21, 2023 before its release as part of Saint Michael V2. "Wizard 101" serves as the project's third song and is named after the 2008 massively multiplayer online role-playing game (MMORPG) Wizard101, developed and published by KingsIsle Entertainment. Lyrically, Redd makes reference to Wizard101, Moncler, Maison Margiela, MILFs, Steve from Minecraft, Nobu, Call of Duty, and other items. The fourth song, "Pepe Lit", was first recorded during sessions for A Love Letter to You 5 in 2022, and was first previewed on 11 September 2022. The beat, uploaded alone to YouTube on December 18, 2021, was created by Mo Beats. "Pepe Lit" originally appeared on the tracklist for Saint Michael, but was replaced by "Saint Michael Myers", and instead was released as part of Saint Michael V2. However, the song was soon removed from streaming platforms. The next song, "Snail Shells", is a more aggressive song featuring YTB Fatt. Redd performs the choruses whilst YTB Fatt performs the verse.

In the sixth track, "TrippieSuave", Redd and his associate K Suave discuss their addictions. As with "Snail Shells", Redd performs the choruses whilst K Suave performs the verse. An alternate song called "TrippieBoat" (featuring Lil Yachty) was originally intended to make the album, but was replaced by "TrippieSuave". The seventh song, "Moncler Coat" sees Redd reference the fashion brand Moncler and compare himself to Batman. The song name "Moncler Coat" was originally leaked by Redd's associate and producer ItsNotHarold on September 20, 2023. The next track, "Psychotic Lunatic", revolves around ideas of mental turbulence and uncertainty. "#SDWL ;)" is the penultimate song on Saint Michael V2. Redd raps about sex, repeating the refrain "She don't want love"; the initials of these words constitute the acronym in the title. The final track, "Skeletons", sees Redd long for an ex-lover. The intro samples a part of "Tired" (Patched Up, 2018) by Beabadoobee, whilst the end of the song uses a voicemail from "Street Runner" (SoulFly, 2021) by Rod Wave. The song had already been known to fans prior to its release, causing Hayley Hynes of HotNewHipHop to write that Redd had pulled the song "out of the closet".

== Commercial performance ==
Saint Michael V2 sold less than 7,000 units first week and failed to chart on the US Billboard 200.

== Track listing ==
Saint Michael V2 track listing
No.	Title	Writer(s)	Producer(s)	Length
1.	"#RBDG"	Michael Lamar White II	Losoe; Soundraw	2:23
2.	"Popular" (with 9lives)	White	9lives	3:08
3.	"Wizard 101"	White	Igor Mamet	2:30
4.	"Pepe Lit"	White	Mo Beats	2:44
5.	"Snail Shells" (with YTB Fatt)	White	Igor Mamet	1:32
6.	"TrippieSuave" (with K Suave)	White	Igor Mamet; Safe	1:47
7.	"Moncler Coat"	White	Oddwin	2:11
8.	"Psychotic Lunatic"	White	A Lau; Bobby Raps; Emerald; Igor Mamet	3:46
9.	"#SWDL ;)"	White	Bosley; Dynox; PerDu; Sharkboy	1:51
10.	"Skeletons"	White	Igor Mamet; Pirate1Pirate; Young Yanabu; T'Rue; Splited Stupid	2:35
Total length:				40:37

Saint Michael track listing
No.	Title	Writer(s)	Producer(s)	Length
1.	"Pray 4 Us"	White; Igor Mamet	Igor Mamet; James Bentley; Cash Cobain	2:59
2.	"Van Cleef Island"	White; Mamet	Oddwin	2:31
3.	"1716 Osage"	White; Mamet	Igor Mamet; T'Rue; Theevoni; Trippie Redd; g06	3:12
4.	"Ok, Cool"	White; Mamet	FLOWRENCY	1:56
5.	"7am in Ohio"	White; Mamet	Igor Mamet; Matty; T'Rue; Theevoni; Trippie Redd; Zerum	1:53
6.	"Yo Pi'erre Slime"	White; Mamet	Pi'erre Bourne	2:46
7.	"Saint Michael Mayers" (with Banks)	White; Mamet	A Lau; Bobby Raps; Emerald; Igor Mamet; Lido; TĀLĀ	2:33

Notes

- The tracks "Psychotic Lunatic", "#SWDL ;)" and "Skeletons" are placed at the end of the full combined tracklist
- The tracks "Pepe Lit" and "Skeletons" were removed from the project soon after release
- The track "Skeletons" samples "Old Piano" (Details, 2002) by Frou Frou
- The track "Pray 4 Us" samples "I Call Your Name" (Switch II, 1979) by Switch
- The track "Van Cleef Island" samples "Neguse" (Neguse, 2013) by Aya Suzaki
- The track "1716 Osage" samples "Rock Bottom" (2008) by Pleasure P and Lil Wayne
- The track "Saint Michael Mayers" samples "Misunderstood" (Serpentina, 2022) by Banks
