= Two Wrongs Don't Make a Right (disambiguation) =

"Two Wrongs Don't Make a Right" is a 1963 song written by Berry Gordy and Smokey Robinson and recorded by Mary Wells.

Two Wrongs Don't Make a Right may also refer to:

- Two wrongs don't make a right, a philosophical expression

== Music ==
- "Two Wrongs Don't Make a Right", a 1973 single by Freda Payne, written by Holland & Dozier
- "Two Wrongs Don't Make A Right", a 1969 song by Wanda Jackson, B-side of single "Two Separate Bar Stools"
- "Two Wrongs Don't Make a Right", a 1980 song by Chilly from the album Showbiz
- "Two Wrongs Don't Make a Right", a 1981 song by Switch from Jermaine Jackson
- "Two Wrongs Don't Make a Right", a 1983 song by Jeffrey Osborne from Stay with Me Tonight
- "Two Wrongs (Don't Make a Right)", a 1987 song by Joe Cocker from Unchain My Heart
- "Two Wrongs Don't Make a Right (But They Make Me Feel a Whole Lot Better)", a 1987 song by Suicidal Tendencies from Join the Army
- "Two Wrongs Don't Make a Right", a 1995 song by the Compulsive Gamblers from Gambling Days Are Over
- "Two Wrongs (Don't Make A Right)", a 2000 song by Dutch band Kayak from Close to the Fire

== See also ==
- "Two Wrongs", a 2002 song by Wyclef Jean
- Two Wrongs Make a Right, a 2017 Cantonese film
