= Pall Mall Groove =

Studio album by Hot-Ice
- Released: 1977
- Recorded: October 1976
- Genres: R&B, funk, soul
- Labels: Polydor Original Germany Release; Source 1979 US re-release as Smash; Burndsman Records 2007 CD reissue of Smash
- Producers: Gregory Williams, Jody Sims, Darnell Wyrick, Bernd Lichters

Hot-Ice chronology
White Heat (1975)	Pall Mall Groove (1977)	Switch (1978)

1979 US reissue as Smash

Pall Mall Groove is an album recorded by Hot-Ice and first released in 1977. Hot-Ice consisted of Gregory Williams, Jody Sims, Bobby DeBarge, Phillip Ingram, Tommy DeBarge, T.C. Brown, Stanley Brown, Darnell Wyrick and Arnett Hayes. Williams, Sims and Bobby DeBarge and Darnell Wyrick were formerly known as White Heat. The album appeared a year before their Motown debut as Switch. The album was commissioned by Bernd Lichters and was initially released only in Germany, Lichters' home country, through Polydor Records. The album includes a re-recording of "Funk Freak" from the previous White Heat album. It was eventually released in the US in 1979, under the group name Smash with the album also renamed Smash, on the MCA Records-distributed Source label. In 2007, it was released again (still renamed Smash) on a limited edition CD through Lichters' own Burndsman Records.

== Track listing ==
Side One:

1. "Pall Mall Groove" (instrumental)
2. "Anyway" (vocals – Darnell Wyrick and Gregory Williams)
3. "I'm Gonna Give (My Whole Life to Music)" (vocals – Arnett Hayes)
4. "Don't Waste My Time" (vocals – T.C. Brown)

Side Two:

1. "Where's the Party" (vocals – Tommy DeBarge)
2. "Your Love" (vocals – T.C. Brown)
3. "Please Don't Let Me Go" (vocals – Bobby DeBarge)
4. "Funk Freak" (vocals – Stanley Brown)
