= Holy Smokes (Trippie Redd song) =

2021 single by Trippie Redd featuring Lil Uzi Vert

Single by Trippie Redd featuring Lil Uzi Vert

from the album Trip at Knight
- Released: July 16, 2021
- Length: 3:01
- Label: 1400 Entertainment; 10K Projects
- Songwriters: Michael White; Symere Woods; Wiebe Grob; Tuheij Maruwanaya
- Producers: Flansie; SSerotonin

Trippie Redd singles chronology
"Miss the Rage" (2021)	"Holy Smokes" (2021)	"Matt Hardy 999" (2021)

Lil Uzi Vert singles chronology
"Die for a Man" (2021)	"Holy Smokes" (2021)	"From the Garden" (2021)

Lyric video
- "Holy Smokes" on YouTube

Music video
- "Holy Smokes" on YouTube

"Holy Smokes" is a song by the American rapper Trippie Redd featuring the American rapper Lil Uzi Vert from the former's fourth studio album, Trip at Knight (2021). It was released by 1400 Entertainment and 10K Projects on July 16, 2021, as the second single from the album. Redd and Lil Uzi Vert wrote the song alongside its producers, Flansie and SSerotonin. The song is the first collaboration between the Redd and Lil Uzi Vert; Redd considers Lil Uzi Vert to be one of the greatest rappers to emerge from the SoundCloud rap scene. A music video directed by Mooch premiered days after the song's release and contained appearances from David Mazouz and Adin Ross. The video displays multiple uses of LED lights and was filmed in various places, including an arcade.

"Holy Smokes" is a pop-inspired song driven by bitcrushed synthesizers and video game-esque vocal samples. The duo rap about earning considerable amounts of money but recognizing it cannot buy love. With a nonchalant vocal delivery, they also sing about what their money can buy and discuss their lifestyles. The track was positively received by critics; HipHopDX felt it was one of the better tracks on Trip at Knight, while other critics highlighted the song's fun and energetic nature. The song reached number 72 on the Billboard Global 200 and appeared on the national charts of the United States, Canada, and New Zealand; the song received a gold certification in the United States by the Recording Industry Association of America (RIAA).

== Background and release ==
In an interview with XXL on May 4, 2021, Trippie Redd praised the American rappers Playboi Carti and Lil Uzi Vert; he called them "some of the G.O.A.T.s" to emerge from the SoundCloud rap scene. Three days later, Carti appeared on Redd's single "Miss the Rage", a song that popularized the hip-hop subgenre rage. It marked Redd's return to hip-hop after releasing the pop-punk reissue album Neon Shark vs Pegasus in 2021. On June 15, 2021, he announced the Tripp at Knight Tour to support his upcoming fourth studio album Trip at Knight, which he officially announced on June 24, alongside its cover artwork. "Holy Smokes", featuring Lil Uzi Vert, was released on July 16, by 1400 Entertainment and 10K Projects, as the second single from the album. It was released alongside an animated lyric video. The song marked the first collaboration between Redd and Lil Uzi Vert.

== Composition ==
"Holy Smokes"
The hook of "Holy Smokes", showcasing Trippie Redd's nonchalant vocal delivery, the song's synthesizer-driven instrumental, and its lyrics discussing money and love.

"Holy Smokes" is three minutes and one second long. Redd and Lil Uzi Vert wrote the song alongside the producers, Flansie and SSerotonin; Igor Mamet handled the song's mixing and mastering. It is a pop-inspired song driven by bitcrushed synthesizers and vocal samples reminiscent of video games from the 1980s. Over a melodic instrumental, Redd and Lil Uzi Vert rap about making considerable amounts of money, but acknowledge they cannot buy love with it: "All this cash on me, but this money still won't buy love." They also sing about the things they are able to buy with it and the ways they can appreciate their lifestyles. In Lil Uzi Vert's verse, they acknowledge their zodiac sign in the line "I just spent me a hundred thousand; I treat it like it's twenty bucks / I'm a Leo, now watch how I fuck the summer up." Jordan Rose of Complex described the song as sounding like "the soundtrack for a tripped-out crusade to find Excalibur". Revolt's Malcolm Trapp called the song's production "arcade-like" and highlighted the "nonchalant tone" of the verses. Anthony Malone for HipHopDX said that the instrumental "sounds like it was ripped from SoundCloud in 2017".

== Reception ==
In a review of Trip at Knight for HipHopDX, Malone thought it was one of the better tracks on the album, writing that the duo "shine together on the hook" and lauded their chemistry. HotNewHipHop's Erika Marie felt the track's pop appeal could "transcend fanbases", while Fred Thomas of AllMusic called Lil Uzi Vert's appearance on the track "lively". Revolt deemed it one of Lil Uzi Vert's best features; Trapp said the song has a "fun hook".

Commercially, "Holy Smokes" peaked at number 72 on the Billboard Global 200 and charted for 2 weeks. It peaked at number 50 on the Billboard Hot 100, charting for 3 weeks. On the Hot R&B/Hip-Hop Songs chart issued by Billboard, it charted for 4 weeks, peaking at number 17. In Canada, the song reached number 65 on the Canadian Hot 100, charting for 2 weeks. In New Zealand, it peaked at number 9 on Recorded Music NZ's New Zealand Hot Singles chart issued for July 23, 2021. The Recording Industry Association of America (RIAA) certified the song gold in the United States on November 9, 2022.

== Music video ==
Mooch directed the music video for "Holy Smokes", which premiered on July 20, 2021. The video begins with the actor David Mazouz seeing an explosion in Downtown Los Angeles, shouting, "Holy smokes!". The sequence is followed by a cameo appearance of the online streamer Adin Ross as a newscaster announcing that Redd will take over the city. The rest of the video features Redd and Lil Uzi Vert performing their verses at an arcade, in a limousine, and in an out-of-service elevator. Some scenes depict money being thrown around and burnt; in one scene, Lil Uzi Vert burns a $100 bill in front of their face. Another scene features a toy car transforming to a real-life one. The scenes filmed in the arcade and in Los Angeles streets were described as "fluorescent and psychedelic" by Hypebeast's Aaron Chow. Brenton Blanchet of Complex said the LED lights present throughout the video "make [the song] feel more vibrant than it already did". Michael Saponara from HipHopDX called the video "energetic", while Blanchet described it as "bright and flashy".

== Charts ==
Chart performance for "Holy Smokes"
Chart (2021)	Peak position
Canada Hot 100 (Billboard)	65
Global 200 (Billboard)	72
New Zealand Hot Singles (RMNZ)	9
US Billboard Hot 100	50
US Hot R&B/Hip-Hop Songs (Billboard)	17

== Certifications ==
Certifications for "Holy Smokes"
Region	Certification	Certified units/sales
United States (RIAA)	Gold	500,000^{‡}
^{‡} Sales+streaming figures based on certification alone.
