= Hate Is Dead =

Mixtape by Trippie Redd
- Released: December 20, 2021
- Genre: Hip-hop; trap; rage; hyperpop; chiptune
- Length: 20:43
- Label: 10K Projects; 1400 Entertainment

Trippie Redd chronology
Trip at Knight (2021)	Hate Is Dead (2021)	First Draft (2022)

Hate Is Dead (stylized as hα†ε ïš dεαd) is the fifth mixtape by American rapper Trippie Redd, released on 20 December 2021 through 10K Projects. The project was exclusively made available through the streaming platform SoundCloud. It features guest appearances from K Suave and Zelly Ocho, both contained within the bonus track "Hate". Production was helmed by Losoe, with other contributions coming from Supah Mario, Level, Naddot, Seal, twoprxducers, UK24, and tnfdemon.

Hate Is Dead sees Trippie Redd delve further into musical genres including rage and hyperpop; genres previously explored on Trip at Knight. The project marks Redd's third full-length release of 2021, the others being Neon Shark vs Pegasus and Trip at Knight. The mixtape received critical acclaim.

== Background and promotion ==
The mixtape was announced by Trippie Redd just hours before its release. It was released through the SoundCloud account belonging to hnrzhunter – apparently a musician managed by Redd. However, HipHopDX has described hnrzhunter as Redd's manager.

Trippie Redd released music videos for "So Thankful" and "Fire In My Heart <3" on 24 December 2021 and 13 February 2022 respectively in collaboration with director DotComNirvan.

== Songs ==
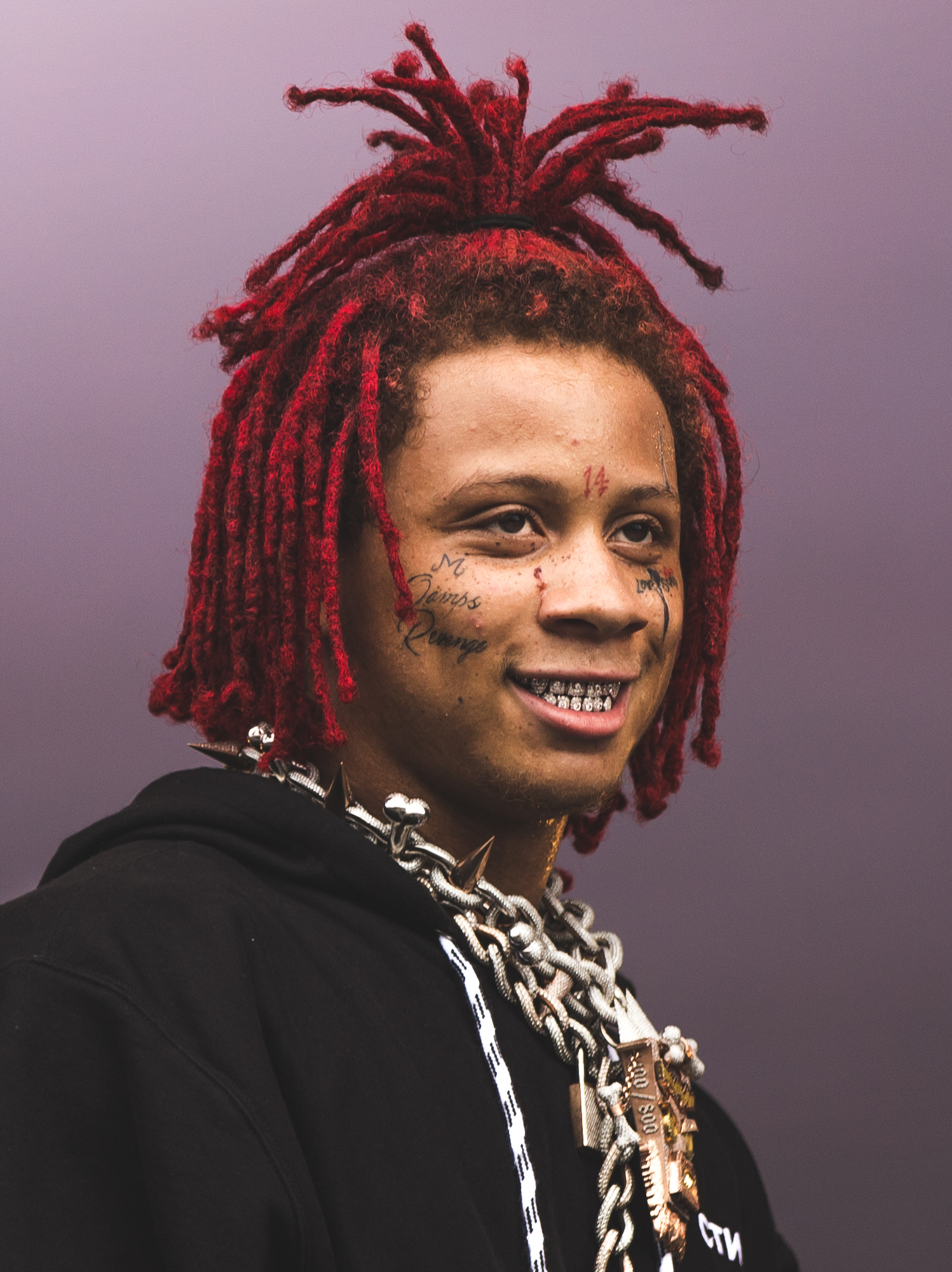
Hate Is Dead is informed by the rage rap genre.

Revolt commented that "the opening track, "Fire In My Heart <3" is a previously leaked offering that quickly reminds listeners why the Canton, Ohio talent holds his position as one of the best of his generation, delivering harmonies about women, violence, vices, and more over production from Loesoe and Supah Mario". Our Generation Music described the song as "another anthemic rage banger for the books". The song is divided into two parts separated by a beat switch; the first part, previously known to fans as "Pour a 4 Up", had leaked on 22 April 2021. Lyrically, the first part of the track concerns Redd's rise to fame and his origins. His line "Say I need God, wasn't no Jesus in them 'partments" refers to the absence of any comfort associated with figures such as Jesus in his youth. By contrast, the second part of the track concerns the problems his fame generates, such as false friends and gold digger women. The second track, "Ready For Love", was originally known to fans as "Cupid" and was recorded on 3 January 2021. Trippie Redd previewed the song many times before it leaked on 21 April 2021. Its intro samples a short video from the video-sharing application Vine. Amidst lyricism regarding love, Redd likens himself to a shark as he previously did on Neon Shark vs Pegasus earlier in 2021. The next song, "So Thankful", was known to fans prior to the mixtape's release as "Clash of Clans" due to the previewed lyric: "This the war of the gods, not no Clash of the Clans". Most of the lyrics see Redd tough talking.

In the fourth track, "Red Line", Trippie Redd advises the listener not to cross the eponymous metaphorical red line or face retribution. The next song, "Throw It Up", features similar lyrical themes of arrogance and boasting. Amongst the references he makes in the song is to the fictional drug "WHY-PHY" from the movie 22 Jump Street. "I Got Game", the sixth song, was previously known to fans as "Hall of Fame". "Mud" was first recorded on January 5, 2021 and was previewed by Redd on the same day. The song leaked on 18 February 2021. Both "I Got Game" and "Mud" lyrically revolve around Redd's pride for his stature. The eighth track, "Forever Young", was previewed multiple times in June 2021. Before release, it was known to fans as "Digital". Lyrically, Redd refers to his desire for eternal youth and his gratitude to God for avoiding excess legal troubles. The final and bonus track, "Hate", features two artists from Redd's roster: Zelly Ocho and K Suave. The three rappers trade bars in the first verse, and afterwards there are consecutive verses delivered by the three artists in succession. All verses refer to the rappers' fame and repute. In 2025, Ocho re-released the song as a single available on major streaming platforms, with Redd and K Suave credited as features.

== Critical reception ==
Professional ratings
Review scores
Source	Rating
HotNewHipHop	'VERY HOTTTTT'

Michael Saponara of HipHopDX reacted very positively to the mixtape, writing: "Trippie stars front-and-center standing alone to carry the effort with the only guest[s] coming on the ninth and final bonus track "Hate" ... The 22-year-old gets experimental with catchy hooks and syrupy rhymes over starry production where he seems to be most comfortable in his own world." Likewise, Alexander Cole of HotNewHipHop commented that "[t]he only song with features is the bonus track, and throughout the first eight songs, Trippie does a great job of carrying the load." Cole also praised the catchiness of Redd’s hooks and praised the mixtape’s production, concluding that "[i]f you've been a fan of Trippie for a while, this EP [mixtape] is going to be a must-listen."

== Track listing ==
Hate Is Dead track listing
No.	Title	Writer(s)	Producer(s)	Length
1.	"Fire In My Heart <3"	Michael Lamar White IV; Cas van der Heijden; Jonathan DeMario Priester	Losoe; Supah Mario	3:48
2.	"Ready for Love"	White	Level	1:35
3.	"So Thankful"	White; Andreas Cristian Matura	Nadddot	1:42
4.	"Red Line"	White; Cas van der Heijden	Losoe	2:44
5.	"Throw It Up"	White; van der Heijden; Seal	Losoe; Seal	2:03
6.	"I Got Game"	White; van der Heijden	Losoe	2:46
7.	"Mud"	White; twoprxducers; Sil van Bebber	twoprxducers; UK24	2:21
8.	"Forever Young"	White; van der Heijden	Losoe	1:50
9.	"Hate" (featuring K Suave and Zelly Ocho)	White; Kevin Earl Gainer; Denzel Young; Tuheij Maruwanaya	tnfdemon	1:49
Total length:				20:43

Notes

- All of the tracks are stylized using Unicode characters; for example, "Fire In My Heart <3" is stylized as "𝔉𝔦𝔯𝔢 ℑ𝔫 𝔐𝔶 ℌ𝔢𝔞𝔯𝔱 <3".
