= Night Time Lover =

Single by La Toya Jackson

from the album La Toya Jackson
- B-side: "Lovely Is She"
- Released: August 1, 1980
- Studio: Hayvenhurst (Encino, Los Angeles)
- Genre: Pop; R&B; soul
- Length: 3:41
- Label: Polydor
- Songwriters: Michael Jackson; La Toya Jackson
- Producer: Michael Jackson

La Toya Jackson singles chronology
"If You Feel the Funk" (1980)	"Night Time Lover" (1980)	"Stay the Night" (1981)

"Night Time Lover" is a song by American singer La Toya Jackson, released as the second single from her eponymous debut album (1980).

== Background ==
The track was produced and co-written by her brother, fellow singer Michael Jackson, who was credited for background vocals. They originally wrote the song for Donna Summer under the title "Fire Is the Feeling".

Bobby DeBarge of the band Switch, La Toya's love interest at the time, wrote the 1980 song "You and I" in response. The song begins: "You know, I was listening to the radio the other day, and I heard the words that you said, that I'm your night time lover."

La Toya performed the song on the November 10, 1980 episode of the Dutch TV program TopPop, and a month later on the December 13 episode of American Bandstand.

== Critical reception ==
In a review for AllMusic, editor Justin Kantor states that "Night Time Lover" is "another primer [...] a softly seductive, simultaneously kinetic number produced by brother Michael."

== Charts ==
Chart performance for "Night Time Lover"
Chart (1980–1981)	Peak position
US Cash Box Black Contemporary Top 100	60
US Hot R&B/Hip-Hop Songs (Billboard)	59
