= My Special Love =

Studio album by La Toya Jackson
- Released: August 1981
- Genre: Funk; R&B
- Length: 36:30
- Label: Polydor
- Producer: Ollie E. Brown; Randy Jackson

La Toya Jackson chronology
La Toya Jackson (1980)	My Special Love (1981)	Heart Don't Lie (1984)

Singles from My Special Love
- 1. "Stay the Night"; 2. "I Don't Want You to Go"

Professional ratings
Review scores
Source	Rating
AllMusic	2/5 stars

My Special Love is the second studio album by American singer-songwriter La Toya Jackson. Released in 1981, the album peaked at #175 on the Billboard 200 albums chart.

The first single from the album was "Stay The Night", a cover of the 1980 Billy Ocean single, and was moderately successful. The second and final single was "I Don't Want You To Go", previously recorded by Lani Hall, which had a limited release and failed to chart. The album also includes rare groove classic "Camp Kuchi Kaiai", co-written with sister Janet who also contributes background vocals. Brother Randy produced two tracks on the album - their duet "Giving You Up" and the title track "My Special Love" which Randy later re-recorded with R&B star Betty Wright for her 1983 album Wright Back At You.

After the album's limited success, it fell into obscurity, receiving a limited re-release on CD in Japan in the early 1990s, which was quickly deleted. The album was the rarest album from LaToya but was re-released on CD in 2019 by Cherry Pop Records including several bonus tracks, among them "If You Feel the Funk" (7" Version) from her debut solo album.

== Reviews ==
In their review, Cashbox stated that "The Jackson's little sis proved she could hold her own in the R&B/pop world with last year's debut LP, and she should hit her stride now with "My Special Love." Her popping, funky progressive B/C sound is given even more of a lift by the vocal support of her brothers and some of the hottest sessioners around. La Toya has a high soprano style that is somewhat reminiscent of brother Michael, but her delivery proves that she is quickly developing a distinct sensual style of her own."

Allmusic called it "the defining album of Jackson's career", also stating that "Though her voice isn't particularly strong, Jackson makes up for what she lacks in power with an energetic, uninhibited approach to the music. Benefiting from solid R&B-funk arrangements and the well-rounded production of Ollie E. Brown, her second album is a flavorful mixture of lively uptempo romps and smooth-sailing slow jams."

== Track listing ==
No.	Title	Writer(s)	Producer(s)	Length
1.	"Stay the Night"	Ken Gold, Billy Ocean	Ollie E. Brown	5:32
2.	"Fill You Up"	Ollie E. Brown	Ollie E. Brown	5:09
3.	"Giving You Up"	Randy Jackson	Randy Jackson	3:08
4.	"Love Song"	Jonathan Moffett, Mike McKinney, Tito Jackson	Ollie E. Brown	4:07
5.	"I Don't Want You to Go"	Allee Willis, Bruce Roberts	Ollie E. Brown	4:18
6.	"Camp Kuchi Kaiai"	La Toya Jackson, Janet Jackson	Ollie E. Brown	3:30
7.	"Summertime with You"	Ollie E. Brown	Ollie E. Brown	5:44
8.	"Special Love"	Randy Jackson, Jackie Jackson, Marlon Jackson, Tito Jackson	Randy Jackson	5:02

=== Expanded edition ===
Bonus tracks
No.	Title	Writer(s)	Producer(s)	Length
1.	"If You Feel the Funk" (7" Version)	Dorie Pride, Kamau Peterson	Ollie E. Brown	4:10
2.	"Are You Ready?" (7" Version)	Ollie E. Brown	Ollie E. Brown	3:45
3.	"Stay the Night" (7" Version)	Ken Gold, Billy Ocean	Ollie E. Brown	3:45
4.	"I Don't Want You to Go" (7" Version)	Allee Willis, Bruce Roberts	Ollie E. Brown	4:12
5.	"Love Song" (7" Version)	Jonathan Moffett, Mike McKinney, Tito Jackson	Ollie E. Brown	4:01
6.	"Stay the Night" (Special Maxi Version)	Ken Gold, Billy Ocean	Ollie E. Brown	5:46

== Charts ==
Chart (1981)	Peak position
US Billboard 200	175
US Cash Box Top 200	140
US Cash Box Black Contemporary Top 75	55
