= White Heat (Switch album) =

Studio album by White Heat
- Released: 1975
- Recorded: 1973–1975
- Genres: R&B, funk, soul
- Label: RCA
- Producers: Barry White, Bob Relf

White Heat chronology
White Heat (1975)	Pall Mall Groove (1977)

White Heat is the self-titled debut album of White Heat, composed of future Switch members Gregory Williams, Bobby DeBarge, Phillip Ingram, and Jody Sims. The album was released in 1975 and produced by Barry White.

== Track listing ==
=== Side A ===
1. "Take a Look at Yourself (Before You Frown on Someone Else)" (5:47)
2. "If That's the Way You Feel (Then Let's Fall in Love)" 4:30
3. "I Love Every Little Thing About You" (originally performed by Stevie Wonder) 3:39
4. "Talkin'" 5:06

=== Side B ===
1. "What a Groove" 5:22
2. "I've Been So Lonely (Without You)" 3:57
3. "You Can Change My Life for Me" 3:20
4. "Funk Freak" 6:39
