= Bobby DeBarge =

American singer (1956–1995)

- DeBarge circa 1979

Background information
- Born: Robert Louis DeBarge Jr. March 5, 1956; Detroit, Michigan, U.S.
- Died: August 16, 1995 (aged 39) Grand Rapids, Michigan, U.S.
- Genres: R&B; soul
- Occupations: Singer; songwriter; composer; musician
- Instruments: Vocals; keyboards; piano; percussion
- Years active: 1975–1988, 1993–1995
- Formerly of: Switch; DeBarge

Robert Louis DeBarge, Jr. (March 5, 1956 – August 16, 1995) was an American singer and musician, best known as the lead vocalist of the R&B group Switch, releasing hit records on the Motown label from 1977 to 1980. He has been noted for his falsetto style of singing. Bobby DeBarge was both mentor and a co-producer of DeBarge, his siblings' band, joining them in 1987.

Substance abuse as a young adult led to a drug trafficking charge in 1988. After a five-year prison sentence, he returned to performing and recording.

== Early life ==
DeBarge was born to Etterlene (née Abney) and Army soldier Robert DeBarge Sr. in Detroit, Michigan. He had an unhappy childhood because of his father's abuse. At 15, DeBarge was introduced to heroin, which became his lifelong addiction. After his parents separated and divorced in the early 1970s, Bobby DeBarge and his family relocated to Grand Rapids. A talented instrumentalist and vocalist, he began playing in local bands, along with his younger brother Tommy.

== Career ==
In 1975, after teaming up with fellow Grand Rapids musician Gregory Williams, the duo began a group with several other Midwestern musicians and successfully auditioned for Barry White's background group, White Heat, helping to produce and release their debut album that year. The following year, White dropped all but one musician from the band due to tax issues. The group – which consisted of DeBarge, Williams, Phillip Ingram, Tommy DeBarge, TC Brown, Stanley Brown, Jody Sims, Arnett Hayes, Adam Frye, Darnell Wyrick, MC Clark and Stanley Hood – then recorded an album in 1976 under the name Hot Ice, titled Pall Mall Groove, which included DeBarge's incredible singing and piano performance on his composition "Please Don't Let Me Go", released in 1977 on Polydor/Germany, in 1979 in the USA/Canada as SMASH on Source Records/MCA, and in 2005 on Burndsman Records worldwide.

That year, DeBarge returned to Grand Rapids, despondent that his career hadn't progressed; he ventured deeper into a heroin addiction. After the break up of White Heat, Gregory Williams remained in Akron, and sought out new musicians [including Tommy DeBarge, Phillip Ingram, Jody Sims, Eddie Fluellen, MC Clark and Arnett Hayes] to start a new band. After completing a demo tape, he took it to Motown Records; the label wanted to sign the group, who were now calling themselves Switch, because of their ability to "switch" instruments. At Williams' invitation, DeBarge, seeking a chance to find musical stardom, vowed to get clean from his heroin addiction. Motown soon signed the act, which now included Bobby's brother Tommy.

A year after their signing, the band released their debut album in 1978. The album, which featured production from Jermaine Jackson, reached gold status thanks to "There'll Never Be," which was solely written by DeBarge, and also featured a favorite ballad of theirs, "I Want to Be Closer", on which Phillip Ingram and DeBarge shared lead. The following year, the group hit gold again with Switch II, another Jermaine Jackson-produced album, which included another DeBarge-penned hit, "I Call Your Name." Switch became a recording and performing attraction, not only due to the band's overall musicianship but also due to DeBarge's multi-octave vocal range. In 1980, Switch released their third album Reaching for Tomorrow. In 1980, the group had their fourth gold-selling album, This Is My Dream, which was the group's first album to not include input from Jackson and which the band's founding members – DeBarge, Jody Sims and Gregory Williams – co-produced. The album included the hit "Love Over and Over Again". By then, DeBarge had returned to using heroin after several years of sobriety and also began using cocaine, which caused tension between DeBarge and Switch group members.

Things came to a head in 1981 when, following the release of Switch's fifth album Switch V, Bobby DeBarge suddenly left the group after Motown offered him a solo recording deal, later finalized in 1983. By then, DeBarge was overseeing the production of his siblings' albums. Bobby co-produced their debut album, and co-wrote with younger brother El the song "Queen of My Heart", in which he performed falsetto ad-libs near the end of the recording. The track later re-appeared on DeBarge's third album, In A Special Way, on which El himself produced, creating a more polished version.

By 1987, perhaps taking their cue from Bobby splitting from his own group, El and their sister Bunny had left DeBarge to pursue solo careers, with El finding the most success. Bobby had troubles producing his solo debut, and his solo career failed to pick up, so he curtailed his aspirations and joined his siblings' group, forming a revamped DeBarge quartet that recorded the album Bad Boys. Bobby and younger brother James split vocal leads on the project. However, Bobby's career halted in 1988 after he was convicted on drug trafficking charges in Grand Rapids and was sentenced to five years in prison. Following his release, he returned to performing and recording, all the while struggling with AIDS, which he contracted sometime in the late 1980s prior to his prison sentence. He finished his last musical work, It's Not Over, shortly before his death but was not alive when the album was distributed independently.

== Personal life ==
For several years, he pursued La Toya Jackson of the Jackson family. He mentioned Jackson's song "Night Time Lover" in the Switch ballad "You & I", a song he wrote in response to Jackson's single. By 1984, DeBarge had split from Jackson and later married Teri, with whom he had two children, Christian and Bobby III. DeBarge's heroin addiction started in the early 1970s and, later, he developed addictions to cocaine and crack.

=== Prison sentence, illness, and death ===
In 1988, he was sentenced to five years in a Wisconsin prison for drug trafficking charges. Following his release in 1993, he vowed to stay clean, signing a management agreement with Bernd Lichters (for whom DeBarge, with Hot Ice, recorded the Pall Mall Groove album years earlier, as well as signing a management agreement as partnership with Ed Wright in 1985), who guided him during 1994 to record songs he wrote in prison. The resulting album, released in August 1995 on A&E Records just before his death, was titled It's Not Over. Throughout that year, he was lying low in Gregory Williams' California home, before he returned to Michigan for his final days.

While in prison, DeBarge confided to his family that he had contracted HIV. When he became gravely ill, his family sent him to a hospice in Grand Rapids. He died of AIDS complications there on August 16, 1995, at the age of 39. He is buried in Garfield Park Cemetery in Grand Rapids.

== In popular culture ==
In June 2019, nearly two years after TV One had first aired Switch's installment of the Unsung series, the network released a biopic about Bobby DeBarge. He was portrayed by Disney alum Roshon Fegan in this film.

== Discography ==
with Switch

- White Heat (1975)
- Pall Mall Groove (1977)
- Switch (1978)
- Switch II (1979)
- Reaching for Tomorrow (1980)
- This Is My Dream (1980)

with DeBarge

- Bad Boys (1987)

Solo

- It's Not Over (1995)
