= Trip at Knight =

Studio album by Trippie Redd
- Released: August 20, 2021
- Recorded: 2017–2021
- Genres: Hip hop; trap; rage; rap rock; hyperpop; chiptune
- Length: 49:36
- Labels: 1400 Entertainment; 10K Projects
- Producers: Ivory Scott IV; Loesoe; Star Boy; Taz Taylor; PinkGrillz88; Dynox; Hammad Beats; RAFMADE; tnfdemon; sserotonin; WNDWS; Nadddot; RokOnTheTrack; Warren Hunter; Cashmere Cat; Outtatown; Aaron Shadrow; Jasper Harris; Rip; 2sided; 3rdup; Lukovíc; bart how; sean baby; Young Cutta; Curtains; HerreraBeats; Turn Me Up Josh; Hitmaka; JTBeatz; UK24

Trippie Redd chronology
Neon Shark vs Pegasus (2021)	Trip at Knight (2021)	Hate Is Dead (2021)

Singles from Trip at Knight
- 1. "Miss the Rage" Released: May 7, 2021; 2. "Holy Smokes" Released: July 16, 2021

Trip at Knight is the fourth studio album by American rapper Trippie Redd. It was released on 20 August 2021, (Note: Redd released the Complete Edition of the album on 21 August, adding the song "Betrayal" (featuring Drake) and making some minor adjustments to other songs.) through 1400 Entertainment and 10K Projects. The project serves as a spin-off to the rapper's debut studio album Life's a Trip (2018). The album features guest appearances from SoFaygo, Drake, Lil Uzi Vert, Playboi Carti, Ski Mask the Slump God, Polo G, Lil Durk, Babyface Ray, Sada Baby, and Icewear Vezzo alongside late rappers Juice Wrld and XXXTentacion. Production was primarily handled by Star Boy, Nadddot, tnfdemon, Loesoe, Cashmere Cat, and Young Cutta, among others.

Trip at Knight sees Trippie Redd explore new musical genres including rage and hyperpop. One critic wrote that "the fluorescent toned digital production taps into his web-focussed roots, while the emphatic beats reflect his arena-ready position". The album was supported by two singles: "Miss the Rage" and the "Holy Smokes". Trippie Redd embarked on a tour in support of the album just days after its release. The project was a commercial success, debuting at number two on the US Billboard 200 chart. It was also well-received by critics and is regarded as a pioneering rage album. On November 9, 2022, Trip at Knight was certified Gold by the Recording Industry Association of America (RIAA).

== Background ==
Trip At Knight is Trippie Redd's second release of 2021, following Neon Shark vs Pegasus (February 2021), a deluxe reissue of Pegasus made in collaboration with American punk rock drummer Travis Barker. The project serves as a spin-off to the rapper's debut studio album Life's a Trip (2018). The album was originally announced in an August 2020 comment section of an Instagram post. Further announcements were made throughout 2020. In November 2020, Redd claimed that the album would have no features except for Chris King, with whom he had previously collaborated on songs including "Love Scars Pt. 2/Rack City" (A Love Letter to You) and "Can You Rap Like Me, Pt. 2" (A Love Letter to You 4), but later backtracked on those comments. Redd revealed the album's cover art on June 24, 2021, followed by its tracklist on August 11, 2021. On the same day, he confirmed that the project would release on August 20, 2021. The project then released on this date.

== Songs ==
=== Tracks 1–5 ===
The album opens with the song "Molly Hearts". Initially, fans believed that the track was to be called "Molly Water" due to Redd previewing the lyrics "So much water on me just like a levee / Molly heart, molly water, water (On that molly) / Molly heart, molly water, water (It's on my body)". When Redd revealed the track list on 11 August 2021, the title was listed as "Molly Heart". However, the song appeared on streaming services as "Molly Hearts". Identified as an early highlight on the album, the song was recognised as "[laying] out the sonic palette for the album as a whole". Lyrically, Redd references several characters and locations from video games, movies, and television shows. The line "Yeah, she put her own molly in her water, n***a, I ain't Rick Ross" directly refers to a line rapped by Ross on rapper Rocko's March 2013 song "U.O.E.N.O.": "Put molly all in her champagne / She ain't even know it / I took her home and I enjoyed that / She ain't even know it." Ross had been dropped as a spokesman for Reebok by the company after controversy. The album's second song, "MP5" (with SoFaygo), is named after the Heckler & Koch MP5, a submachine gun in the Call of Duty video game series. The song was initially intended to feature Tyga but he was replaced by SoFaygo. This marked the first collaboration between Trippie Redd and SoFaygo. "MP5", whose instrumental is a "synth-heavy" rage beat, was commended as a standout from Trip at Knight. The song's music video was released on 20 August 2021 and depicts Redd and SoFaygo killing zombies. Critics noted similarities between the music video and the music video for Redd's "Dark Knight Dummo" (2017).

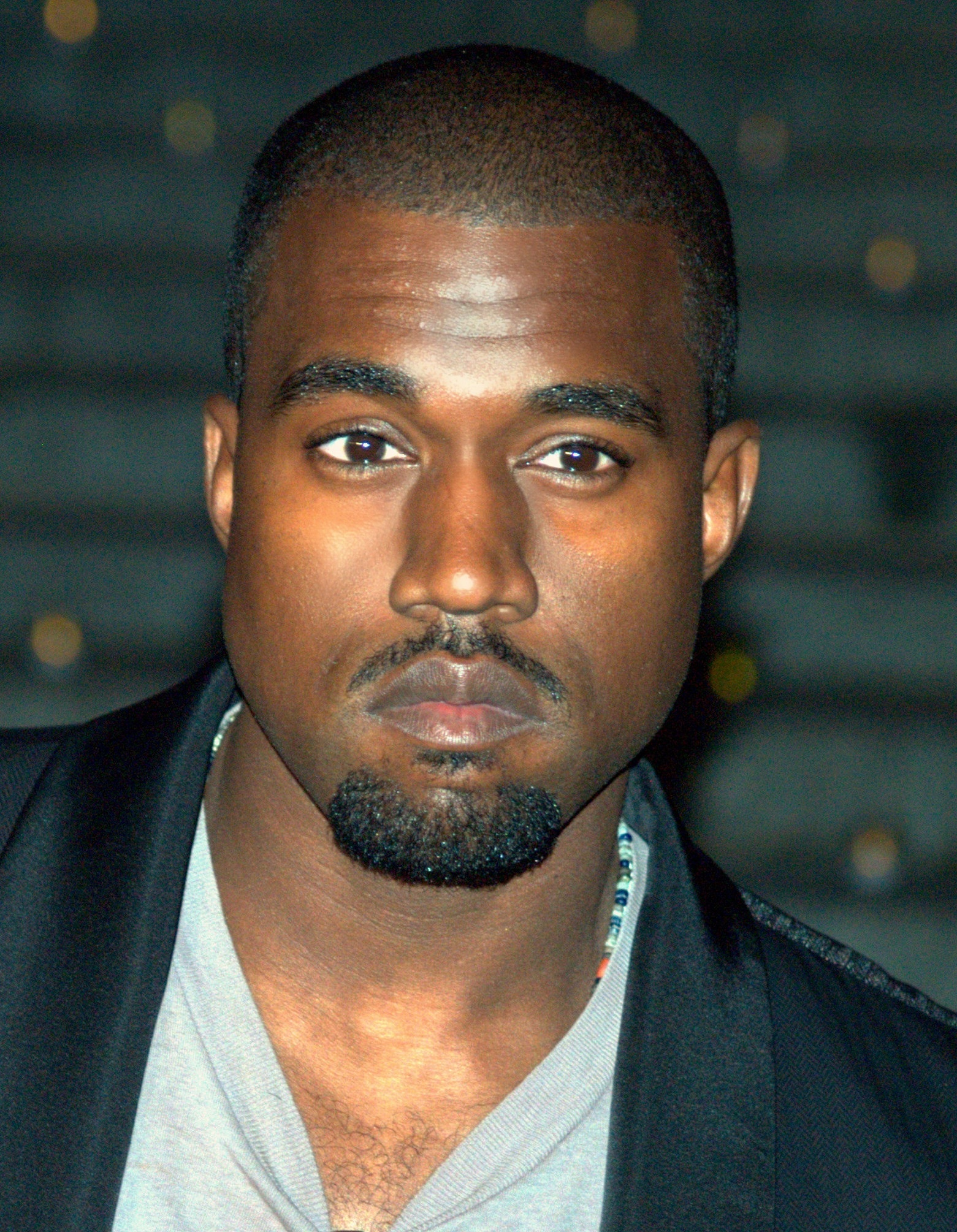
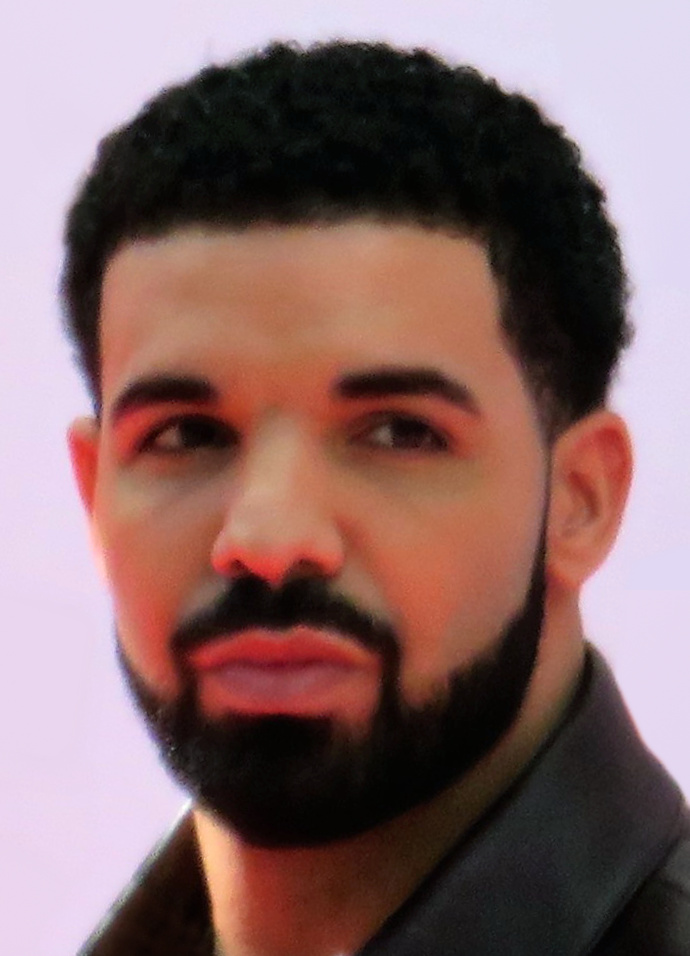
The song "Betrayal" reinvigorated the highly-publicised feud between Kanye West (left) and Drake (right)

The third track, "Betrayal" (featuring Drake), was originally listed by Trippie Redd as part of the track-list, yet the song was not part of the album upon its initial release. However, "Betrayal" was later released in the complete edition of Trip at Knight on 21 August 2021. This song marked the first ever collaboration between Redd and Drake; the two had been set to collaborate on Drake's song "God's Plan" (2018) but Redd had missed the deadline to send in his verse. Before the release of "Betrayal", there had been speculation that Redd was going to appear on Drake's next album Certified Lover Boy. Lyrically, Redd references several cultural elements including video game character Liu Kang and fast casual restaurant Raising Cane's Chicken Fingers. In his verse, Drake disses Kanye West, reigniting their feud. Drake raps: "All these fools I'm beefin' that I barely know / 45, 44 (burned out), let it go / Ye ain't changin' sh*t for me, it's set in stone". On the same day as the song's release, West shared what seemed to be Drake's Toronto address in an Instagram post that he later deleted. The fourth track, "Finish Line", sees Redd detail his sexual experiences with a woman. The song was first previewed through Redd's Instagram story in February 2020, and then again in an Instagram post in early March 2020. Clash described the song as an "early high". The next song, "Holy Smokes", serves as the album's second single. It is Redd's first collaboration with Lil Uzi Vert; Redd had selected the rapper for the feature after requests from his fans. Lyrically, Redd sings about his wealth but how this cannot buy him love. Complex described the song as sounding like "the soundtrack for a tripped-out crusade to find Excalibur". HipHopDX stated that it was one of the stronger songs on the album, writing that the duo "shine together on the hook" and lauding their chemistry. The music video was released on 20 July 2021. It features a cameo from Adin Ross as a newscaster and was well-received by critics.

=== Tracks 6–10 ===
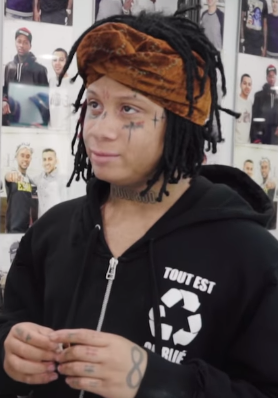
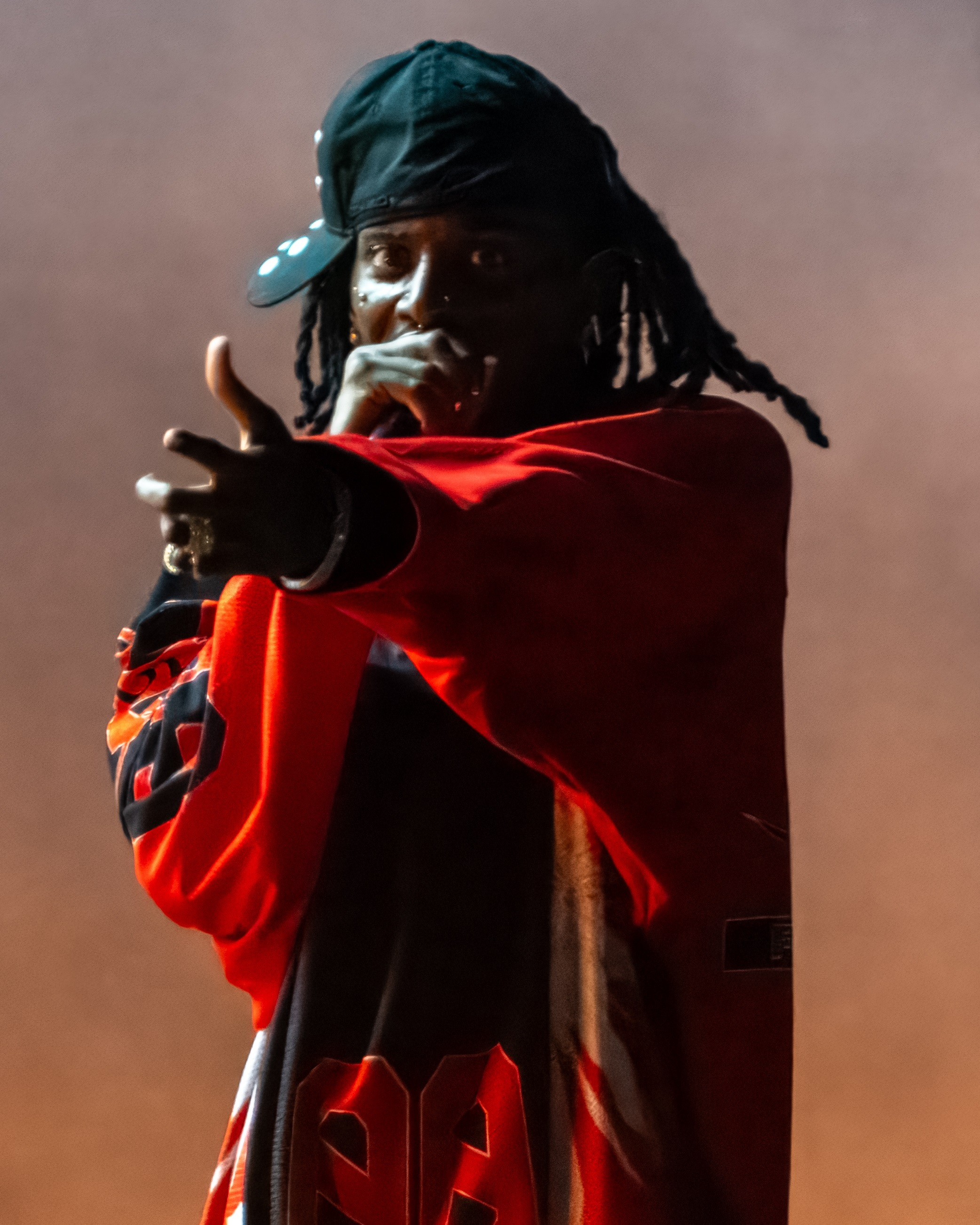
The song "Miss the Rage" is a collaboration between Trippie Redd (left) and Playboi Carti (right)

In Review wrote that Trip at Knight's sixth song, "Super Cell", "is constructed around a basic premise: how many Dragon Ball Z references can one man cram into a less than three-minute song? Apparently, a lot, as Trippie is "invincible" like the Legendary Super Saiyan Broly, is eating well like that "fat n***a" Majin Buu, is going to "hit the fusion dance" like Trunks and Goten, and even finds time to rhyme "Piccolo" with "pick a loaf"." Redd initially previewed the song in a now-deleted Instagram post on 1 June 2021. Before its release, the song became popular on TikTok. When Redd revealed the track list for the project, the title was listed as "Supercell". However, the song appeared on streaming services as "Super Cell". The seventh song and lead single, "Miss the Rage", is a collaboration with Playboi Carti. It peaked at number 11 on the Billboard Hot 100, becoming Redd's highest-charting song on the chart. Redd originally teased the track on Instagram in December 2020. Later, an edit of the song containing Playboi Carti's vocals from "Want To" – his leaked collaboration with the late Juice Wrld – atop the song's beat went viral on TikTok. The popularity of the edit led to Redd asking Carti to collaborate on "Miss the Rage". In February 2021, Redd's intention of featuring Carti on the song became public after a screenshot of a groupchat was leaked. Redd then confirmed Carti's involvement one month later by sharing a screenshot of their chat in a since-deleted Instagram post. The cover art and release date were revealed on 3 May 2021, and the music video was released on 27 May 2021. The song's title also became a motto on Redd's social media posts. The song's title refers Redd's longing to perform during the COVID-19 pandemic lockdowns. Redd stated: "I been [sic] locked away. I'm one of them people that's at the festivals, I come out going crazy out the rips. I'm ready to get back to my stage presence. I'm tired of this shit. I'm tired of sitting in the house 'cause that's all I been doing. With all the COVID shit going on, I was just in my creative space making music that I really fucked with".

"Supernatural", the next song on the album, sees Redd rap about street life, his successes, and remaining loyal to where he grew up. Redd previewed the song on Instagram in June 2021. It was later leaked alongside the rest of Trip At Knight on August 17. The song's music video was released on 24 August 2021. The song is composed of two parts, the first of which is "upbeat". Upon the beat switch, the instrumental becomes "darker" and "lower". The ninth song, "Demon Time", is a collaboration with fellow rapper Ski Mask the Slump God. The song marked their first song together in three years following "Ghost Busters", a reworked version of which was also released in Trip at Knight as "Danny Phantom". The instrumental used is an altered version of producer Nadddot's fan-made Playboi Carti track, "*Givenchy". Redd first hinted at the collaboration by posting images of himself and Ski in the studio. Using Instagram, he previewed the song on 6 June 2021. On 13 August, Redd and Ski began teasing the song's music video via Instagram. On 2 September, the video was officially released. The tenth song, "Matt Hardy 999" (with Juice Wrld), is a reworked version of a previously leaked song. The track was initially teased within a YouTube interview with No Jumper in September 2018. It was then leaked in full on 23 January 2020. On 14 July 2021, a snippet of a new, shortened version of the song was leaked. It featured a new rage instrumental. The song – named after American wrestler Matt Hardy – was then released with the album later that year. Lyrically, as NME wrote, "the two exercise their braggadocio perfectly, their back-to-back approach meshing beautiful, as one seems to randomly pick up from the other: "Asking if I love her, I told her 'hardly' / Jumping off the top rope on that bitch like Matt Hardy"." Matt Hardy himself acknowledged the reference to him in the song and its title, tweeting: "It's very flattering that [Juice Wrld] named one of his final raps after me. It's nice to be honored for all of the sacrifices I've made for people's entertainment over the years. #RIPJUICEWRLD". He added: "I didn't [initially know about the song before its release]. Not until people started buzzing me on it." The song was critically acclaimed, often as the best track on the album.

=== Tracks 11–18 ===
The eleventh track, "Vibes", sees Redd boast of how much he enjoys life because of his accumulation of money. Redd initially previewed this song on an Instagram live on 22 March 2021. The song then leaked along with the rest of the album on 17 August 2021. The next song, "New Money", was also initially previewed by Redd via Instagram live (on 21 February 2021). It contains similar lyricism to its precursor; one critic wrote that ""Vibes" has a bit of a retro video game feel to ... [it, with Redd] bragging about getting that paper whereas "New Money" continues the themes of wealth except it's much more cloudier." Trip at Knight's thirteenth song, "Danny Phantom", is a reworked version of Redd and XXXTentacion's song "Ghost Busters", which was released 3 days after XXXTentacion's murder. This new version has a rage instrumental and is without the original's verses from Quavo and Ski Mask the Slump God. The collaboration between the two rappers was first hinted at by Redd's manager in July 2021. XXXTentacion's mother, responding to questions about the upcoming song, simply replied "Gotta wait and see". XXXTentacion's associate and producer, John Cunningham, later revealed that his verse was taken from "Ghost Busters"; the only difference between his verses on the two different versions is ad-libs found only in the reworked song. Common to both songs is a spoken-word intro, which is a recreation of a clip from a Fox 10 (Arizona) News report. On 7 August 2017, Fox 10 reported that a young teen had vandalized a car dealership in Tempe, Arizona, with numbers and words associated with Redd. In Review wrote that ""Danny Phantom" — a retooling of previously released "Ghost Busters" — features one of X[XXTentacion]'s sunniest artistic contributions to date, ending with Trippie calling out to his fallen comrade with a pained cry. Regardless of how one feels about the late-Florida rapper, it's an undeniably touching gesture from one friend to another; a moment where Trippie's pain, for once, feels palpable."

In "Space Time", Redd asserts his position as one of rap's "top five". The song was first previewed on 4 April 2021. The fifteenth song, "Baki", sees Redd rap about elements of his lifestyle including wealth and drugs. The song originally had an outro consisting of a clip taken from the anime Baki the Grappler, yet when the Complete Edition dropped it was removed owing to copyright issues. In "iPhone", the following song, Redd reflects on his rise to fame and calls out to a lover, singing "Call me when you want / Call me when you need me". "iPhone" was produced by Young Cutta and Curtains; after the reveal of the album's tracklist on 11 August 2021, Curtains shared a screenshot of a text message from Cutta, confirming both producers' involvements with the song. On the next track, "Rich MF", Redd unites with Chicago rappers Polo G and Lil Durk on a beat made by five producers. In Review wrote that "the moody and aggressive "Rich MF" has a Chicago-based tinge with an agitated Polo G and unflappable Lil Durk in the mix, as Trippie contemplates all the ways he's a "motherfucker" on the chorus, whether he be a "rich" one or a "sexy" seducer of mamas." "Rich MF" was regarded as a standout from the album by some outlets. A first version of the track surfaced online in the earlier months of 2021, with the same beat as the official release but without Lil Durk's verse. During June 2021, Redd released two pre-save links: one for the whole album and one just for the track "Rich MF", thus hinting that the song would be the project's second single. However, Redd eventually replaced it with "Holy Smokes". The eighteenth and final track, "Captain Crunch" (with Sada Baby and Icewear Vezzo featuring Babyface Ray), is a collaboration between Redd and several Detroit rappers. It was teased in part on Redd's Instagram on 13 August 2021, prior to its release with the rest of the album.

== Packaging and promotion ==
Trippie Redd released the lead single for the album, "Miss the Rage", a collaboration with American rapper Playboi Carti, on May 7, 2021. This was followed by the second single "Holy Smokes", featuring American rapper Lil Uzi Vert on July 16, 2021. "Captain Crunch" featuring Sada Baby, Babyface Ray, and Icewear Vezzo, "MP5" featuring SoFaygo", and "Matt Hardy 999" featuring Juice Wrld were all listed as singles with the Trip at Knight cover on streaming services, with two receiving music videos. Trip at Knight's album cover was designed by artist Stephen Gibb – who also designed the cover of Life's a Trip (2018) – in a 'bubblegum surrealist' style. It depicts Trippie Redd "at the end of a lollipop with bright sunny skies and gummy bears on one side while UFOs approach a headless knight removing his skull after a fire breathing dragon had removed his helmet prior". Gibb stated of the design: "I fashioned Trippie as a product to be consumed, which every popular recording artist is essentially packaged to be." The album cover was included in Heaviest of Art's list of the top 30 album covers of 2021. Gibb also designed the cover artwork for the single "Holy Smokes".

Redd also curated an art exhibit at The Gallery in Los Angeles in support of the album. The event, hosted by SoundCloud, was a visual timeline for Trippie's rise to international fame. Attendees had the opportunity to receive limited edition Trip At Knight tour merchandise and signed album copies. Celebrities in attendance included Wiz Khalifa, Iann Dior and Chris King.

=== Tour ===
Trippie Redd embarked on a tour – named the 'Tripp at Knight' tour – in support of the album on 25 August, just 5 days after its release. Tickets had been available since June 18. The tour was produced by Live Nation Entertainment and presented by Rolling Loud. The tour consisted of 25 performances in locations including Baltimore, Brooklyn, Miami, Portland and Houston. The tour began in Minneapolis and ended in Los Angeles in October. Guests included Iann Dior and SoFaygo. The tours reportedly had "high energy mosh pits". On September 7, Trippie Redd's tour bus was shot at following the concert in Baltimore, Maryland.

== Critical reception ==
Professional ratings
Aggregate scores
Source	Rating
Metacritic	68/100
Review scores
Source	Rating
The Line of Best Fit	6/10
HotNewHipHop	'VERY HOTTTTT'
PopMatters	(very favorable)
HipHopDX	3.3/5 stars
In Review	(favorable)
Billboard	(very favorable)
AllMusic	3.5/5 stars
Catalyst	(very favorable)
laut.de	3/5 stars
Clash	7/10
NME	3/5 stars

Trip at Knight received generally positive reviews from critics. Trippie Redd's shift in sound was received well by critics including The Line of Best Fit, which wrote: "It's unquestionably the most focused he's ever been, essentially slotting into a ratcheted up (or mollied up), bass thumping, forceful lane and staying there. Which isn't to say he's shaved away his idiosyncrasies: he's still comparing himself to Piccolo, Goku and gleefully rapping, "You n***as Autobots, I'm a damn Gundam" on "Supernatural". Hell, "Baki", named for a Japanese manga & anime, also finds him name dropping Darth Vader and Joe Exotic with moments of each other. It's a cultural smorgasbord that befits Redd's character well." In Review called the album "easily the most clear-sighted project Trippie's released in over three years"; likewise, Clash wrote that that which emerges from the album is "a defiant and indefatigable figure". Billboard praised Redd's vocal performance on the album. PopMatters wrote that the record was "a bold, maximalist, and excitingly futuristic concoction". Fred Thomas of AllMusic wrote that "[f]ollowing his bloated 2020 album Pegasus by just under a year, chart-topping rapper Trippie Redd's fourth studio album Trip At Knight is something of a return to form. … Concise and brisk, … [it] is one of the more focused Trippie Redd albums, and calls for repeat listening where some of the others were difficult to get all the way through." Catalyst also praised the album's length. Music critic Anthony Fantano said that the project was the best Redd had ever released. However, NME said that while Trip at Knight had "embrace[d] the colourful production of hyper-pop", the album suffered from "a lack of quality control". The paper wrote that Trippie should "slow down and focus on longevity", opining that Trip at Knight doesn't "tend to reward repeat listens" though Life's a Trip does. In Review opined that some songs on the album were "disposable filler".

Redd was praised for his heavy use of guest appearances on the album. In Review wrote that "all [the guest appearances were] uniformly solid, playing off of Trippie in fun and inventive ways". Billboard wrote that, despite the amount of guest appearances, "Trip At Knight poses Redd as its persistent (and mildly maniacal) central figure". The Line of Best Fit opined that "Redd finds inspiration in his guests more often than not on Trip at Knight." Redd also received some criticism for a perceived over-reliance on features, but was commended for the manner in which he used posthumous features, with In Review writing: "in an era where posthumous features are given out left and right, it feels refreshing to hear two unused verses from two departed talents — Juice Wrld and XXXTentacion, respectively — which were recorded for these specific tracks in mind. "Matt Hardy 999" has Juice and Trippie trading freestyled verses back and forth, with each new line somehow being more ridiculous than the last, and "Danny Phantom" — a retooling of previously released "Ghost Busters" — features one of XXXTentacion's sunniest artistic contributions to date, ending with Trippie calling out to his fallen comrade with a pained cry. Regardless of how one feels about the late-Florida rapper, it's an undeniably touching gesture from one friend to another; a moment where Trippie's pain, for once, feels palpable." Clash added that "the appearances of Juice Wrld – on 'Matt Hardy 999' – and XXXTentacion – on 'Danny Phantom' – serve as a reminder of the cost success has had on an entire generation of American rap artists. Juice Wrld's bars are effective, for sure; X remains a difficult artist to listen to in light of the abusive events which immediately preceded his passing." HipHopDX too complimented Redd's use of posthumous features, writing of "Danny Phantom" (featuring XXXTentacion): "[w]ith the poor track record of X appearances since his death in 2018, it's refreshing to hear a verse that sounds like it was recorded while he was alive, showing how much Trippie cared for his friend."

Critical consensus indicated that "MP5" (with SoFaygo), "Betrayal" (featuring Drake), "Holy Smokes" (featuring Lil Uzi Vert), "Miss the Rage" (with Playboi Carti), "Supernatural" and particularly "Matt Hardy 999" (with Juice Wrld) were amongst the best songs on the album. In Review opined that Trip at Knight's highlights were "Betrayal", "Super Cell" and "Supernatural", the latter of which "opens with a traditional Trippie flow and delivery over glitchy production, all before a sudden beat switch-up that activates his attack mode ("Pussy boy got pushed out the whip / I watched 'em roll and tumble") going from zero to 100 real quick, to say the least." Catalyst wrote that the project's best songs were "MP5", "Rich MF" and "iPhone". Clash identified other highlights, writing that the "highs spring out from first listen. 'Molly Hearts' swaggers into view and effectively lays out the sonic palette for the album as a whole – barbed digi tones that verge on 8-bit, and raps that move from all-out braggadocio to surreal, jokey word play. 'Finish Line' is an early high, while 'Demon Time' – featuring Ski Mask the Slump God – injects some darkness into his day-glo aesthetic." The Line of Best Fit reserved particular praise for "Matt Hardy 999" (with Juice Wrld), writing that the song "is one of the most delirious statements he's [Redd's] released yet, sliding seamlessly back and forth between aggression and smoothness, practically intoxicating in its brazenness." HipHopDX added that "the late Juice Wrld delivers a posthumous performance that sounds like he's ascending to the heavens as he raps. Trippie complements Juice's energy, showing why the two had such great chemistry on tracks like '1400/999 Freestyle'." Grunge Cake described the song as a "personal favorite", and PopMatters called it an album highlight, praising it for making "excellent use of Juice Wrld's emotive vocals". NME wrote that "arguably the highlight of this record… is the wrestler-referencing 'Matt Hardy 999'. It's clearly a celebration not only of Trippie's wordplay, but also of the undeniable creativity exemplified by his late peer Juice Wrld. It's their fourth posthumous collaboration together – and they never miss. Over the wheezing synths and fried 808s, the two exercise their braggadocio perfectly, their back-to-back approach meshing beautiful, as one seems to randomly pick up from the other: "Asking if I love her, I told her 'hardly' / Jumping off the top rope on that bitch like Matt Hardy"."

=== Year-end lists ===
Select year-end rankings for Trip at Knight
Publication	List	Rank	Ref.
Billboard	The 20 Best Hip-Hop Albums of 2021	16	
KTXT-FM	Top 100 Albums of 2021	53	

== Legacy and influence ==
Trip at Knight is credited with helping to define the rage microgenre of trap music. Andre Gee described it in 2023 as "a trip back to SoundCloud heaven", and Zack Sulkis called it "a masterpiece of modern rap" the same year.

== Commercial performance ==
Trip at Knight topped the pre-add chart on Apple Music, above Ed Sheeran's =. The album debuted at number two on the US Billboard 200 chart, behind Sour by Olivia Rodrigo. With "impressive sales numbers", it moved 80,600 album-equivalent units (including 7,000 copies in pure album sales) in its first week. The album was also the biggest streaming album of the week with 97.1 million individual song streams. On November 9, 2022, Trip at Knight was certified Gold by the Recording Industry Association of America (RIAA).

From the record project, "Miss the Rage" (11), "Matt Hardy 999" (49), "Holy Smokes" (50), "Rich MF" (56), "Betrayal" (67), "MP5" (86), "Danny Phantom" (92) and "Demon Time" (94) all charted within the Billboard Hot 100. "Super Cell" (1), "Molly Hearts" (3), "Finish Line" (9) and "Supernatural" (19) all charted within the Bubbling Under Hot 100. On 9 November 2022, "Holy Smokes", "Rich MF" and "Matt Hardy 999" achieved Gold certification from the Recording Industry Association of America (RIAA). On 29 November 2021, "Miss the Rage" achieved Platinum certification from the Recording Industry Association of America (RIAA).

== Track listing ==
Trip at Knight track listing
No.	Title	Writer(s)	Producer(s)	Length
1.	"Molly Hearts"	Michael White IV; Cas van der Heijden	Loesoe	2:42
2.	"MP5" (with SoFaygo)	White; Andre Burt; Anton Mendo	Star Boy	2:39
3.	"Betrayal" (featuring Drake)	White; Aubrey Graham; Danny Lee Snodgrass, Jr; Ethan McCallum-Williams; Brody Fallon	Taz Taylor; PinkGrillz88; Dynox	2:32
4.	"Finish Line"	White; Adrian Rupke; Addison Rineer	Hammad Beats; RAFMADE	2:22
5.	"Holy Smokes" (featuring Lil Uzi Vert)	White; Symere Woods; Igor Mamet; Tuheij Maruwanaya; Wiebe Grob	tnfdemon; sserotonin	3:01
6.	"Super Cell"	White; Jøseph Hellington; Andreas Matura	WNDWS; Nadddot	2:41
7.	"Miss the Rage" (with Playboi Carti)	White; Jordan Carter; Mamet; Heijden	Loesoe	3:56
8.	"Supernatural"	White; Rok Curkovic; Warren Hunter; Matura	RokOnTheTrack; Warren Hunter; Nadddot	2:20
9.	"Demon Time" (with Ski Mask the Slump God)	White; Stokeley Goulbourne; Matura	Nadddot	2:39
10.	"Matt Hardy 999" (with Juice Wrld)	White; Jarad Higgins; Mendo; Tobias Dekker; Magnus Høiberg; Aaron Shadrow; Jasper Harris; Jean Christophe Marie	Cashmere Cat; Star Boy; Outtatown; Aaron Shadrow; Jasper Harris; Rip	3:08
11.	"Vibes"	White; Maruwanaya; 2sided; 3rdup	tnfdemon; 2sided; 3rdup	2:04
12.	"New Money"	White; Maruwanaya; Lukovic	tnfdemon; Lukovic	2:24
13.	"Danny Phantom" (featuring XXXTentacion)	White; Jahseh Onfroy; Høiberg; Mendo; Dekker	Cashmere Cat; Star Boy; Outtatown	2:16
14.	"Space Time"	White; Mendo; Bart van Hoewijk	Star Boy; bart how	1:59
15.	"Baki"	White; Matura; sean baby	Nadddot; sean baby	2:27
16.	"iPhone"	White; Henry Lotas-Sherratt; Lou Viatti	Young Cutta; Curtains	2:01
17.	"Rich MF" (with Polo G featuring Lil Durk)	White; Taurus Bartlett; Durk Banks; Joshua Herrera; Joshua Samuel; Christian Ward; James Thierren; Henry Lotas-Sherratt; Ivory Scott	HerreraBeats; Turn Me Up Josh; Hitmaka; JTBeatz; Young Cutta	4:07
18.	"Captain Crunch" (with Sada Baby and Icewear Vezzo featuring Babyface Ray)	White; Casada Sorrell; Chivez Smith; Marcellus Register; Sil van Bebber; Dekker; Mendo	UK24; Outtatown; Star Boy	4:10
Total length:				49:36

Notes

- Although "Betrayal" featuring Drake was originally listed by Trippie Redd as part of the tracklisting, the song was not part of the album upon its initial release. However, Betrayal was later released in the complete edition of Trip at Knight on August 21, 2021.
- In addition, "Molly Hearts" and "Super Cell" were originally listed on Trippie Redd's announcement as "Molly Heart" and "Supercell", respectively.
- "Danny Phantom" is a reworked version of Trippie's and X's "Ghost Busters", which was released 3 days after XXXTentacion's murder. The new version is backed by a new "rage" style instrumental and doesn't contain the original's verses from Quavo and Ski Mask the Slump God.
- Similar to "Danny Phantom", "Matt Hardy 999" is a reworked version of Trippie and the late Juice Wrld's collaboration on a previously leaked song. The new version is also, a hyper/rage style instrumental.

== Charts ==
=== Weekly charts ===
Weekly chart performance for Trip at Knight
Chart (2021)	Peak position
Australian Albums (ARIA)	9
Austrian Albums (Ö3 Austria)	11
Belgian Albums (Ultratop Flanders)	8
Belgian Albums (Ultratop Wallonia)	32
Canadian Albums (Billboard)	4
Danish Albums (Hitlisten)	20
Dutch Albums (Album Top 100)	12
Finnish Albums (Suomen virallinen lista)	42
German Albums (Offizielle Top 100)	47
Irish Albums (Official Charts)	13
Italian Albums (FIMI)	61
Lithuanian Albums (AGATA)	19
New Zealand Albums (RMNZ)	5
Norwegian Albums (VG-lista)	5
Spanish Albums (Promusicae)	65
Swedish Albums (Sverigetopplistan)	31
Swiss Albums (Schweizer Hitparade)	6
UK Albums (Official Charts)	15
US Billboard 200	2
US Top R&B/Hip-Hop Albums (Billboard)	1

=== Year-end charts ===
Year-end chart performance for Trip at Knight
Chart (2021)	Position
US Billboard 200	173
US Top R&B/Hip-Hop Albums (Billboard)	62

== Certifications ==
Region	Certification	Certified units/sales
Canada (Music Canada)	Gold	40,000^{‡}
United States (RIAA)	Gold	500,000^{‡}
^{‡} Sales+streaming figures based on certification alone.
