= Danny Phantom (song) =

2021 song by Trippie Redd featuring XXXTentacion

Song by Trippie Redd featuring XXXTentacion

from the album Trip at Knight
- Released: August 20, 2021
- Recorded: 2017–2021
- Genre: trap; rage
- Length: 2:17
- Label: 1400 Entertainment; 10k
- Songwriters: Michael White; Jahseh Onfroy; Anton Mendo; Tobias Dekker; Magnus August Høiberg
- Producers: Cashmere Cat; Star Boy; Outtatown

Music video
- "Danny Phantom" on YouTube

"Danny Phantom" is a song by American rapper Trippie Redd featuring fellow American rapper XXXTentacion. It was released on August 20, 2021, as the thirteenth song from Redd's fourth studio album, Trip at Knight. The song was produced by Cashmere Cat, Star Boy and Outtatown.

== Background ==
"Danny Phantom" is a reworked version of the song "Ghost Busters" by Trippie Redd and XXXTentacion featuring rappers Quavo and Ski Mask the Slump God, produced by Honorable C.N.O.T.E. which was released on SoundCloud on June 21, 2018, 3 days after XXXTentacion's murder.

The track was first hinted at by Redd's manager in July 2021. XXXTentacion's mother, responding to questions about the upcoming song, simply replied "Gotta wait and see". This new version features a rage-inspired instrumental produced by Cashmere Cat, Star Boy and Outtatown, includes previously unreleased ad-libs from XXXTentacion, and omits the guest verses from Quavo and Ski Mask.

The song was released alongside an animated music video directed by KDC Visions.

== Personnel ==
Credits adapted from Apple Music.

- Michael Lamar White II - performer, songwriter
- Jahseh Onfroy - performer, songwriter
- Magnus August Høiberg - composer, producer
- Tobias Dekker - composer, producer
- Anton Mendo - composer, producer
- Peter Jideonwo - composer, executive producer
- Igor Mamet - mixing engineer, mastering engineer

== Charts ==
Chart performance for "Danny Phantom"
Chart (2021)	Peak position
US Billboard Hot 100	92
US Hot R&B/Hip-Hop Songs (Billboard)	34
