= I Don't Want You to Go (Lani Hall song) =

1980 single by Lani Hall

- Single cover

Single by Lani Hall

from the album Blush
- B-side: "Only You"
- Released: April 1980
- Recorded: 1980
- Genre: Pop
- Length: 4:29
- Label: A&M
- Songwriters: Allee Willis; Bruce Roberts
- Producers: Allee Willis; Dick Rudolph

"I Don't Want You to Go" is a song written by Allee Willis and Bruce Roberts. It has been recorded by a number of different artists.

== Lani Hall version ==
The song was published on May 7, 1980 and its copyright registered on June 30 of that year. "I Don't Want You to Go" first appeared on Lani Hall's studio album Blush in 1980. It was later modified by Herb Alpert for her 1984 compilation album Collectibles...

=== Personnel ===
- Harvey Mason - drums
- Gary Ferguson - drums
- David Hungate - bass
- Jeremy Lubbock - keyboards, instrumental arrangement
- Michael Boddicker - synthesizers
- Gerald Vinci - concertmaster
- Jules Chaikin - contractor
- Background vocals: David Lasley, Arnold McCuller, Marcy Levy, Tommy Funderburk, Sharon Reid, Allee Willis, Lani Hall

== La Toya Jackson version ==
"I Don't Want You to Go"

Single by La Toya Jackson

from the album My Special Love
- B-side: "Love Song"
- Released: 1981
- Recorded: 1981
- Genre: Soul
- Length: 4:22
- Label: Polydor
- Songwriters: Bruce Roberts, Allee Willis
- Producer: Ollie E. Brown

La Toya Jackson singles chronology
"Stay the Night" (1981)	"I Don't Want You to Go" (1981)	"Bet'cha Gonna Need My Lovin'" (1983)

"I Don't Want You to Go" is the second single from American singer La Toya Jackson's second album My Special Love. It was released on 7" format with the album track "Love Song" as its B-side. Jackson performed "I Don't Want You to Go" on the October 10, 1981 episode of Soul Train. AllMusic reviewer Justin Kantor praised Jackson's vocal performances on the other songs on My Special Love but said that her performance of "I Don't Want You to Go" "isn't up to the task."

=== Track listing ===
US 7" vinyl (PD 2188DJ)

1. "I Don't Want You to Go" - 3:58
2. "Love Song" - 4:03

== Other versions ==
In 1982, Tanya Tucker covered the song on her fourteenth studio album Changes.

A popular song in the Philippines, it has been covered by a number of local artists, including the following:

- In 1981, Sharon Cuneta covered the song for the soundtrack to the film P.S. I Love You and re-recorded again in 2006 on her nineteenth studio album Isn't It Romantic?. The song is a staple of Cuneta's repertoire. Of the songs on Isn't It Romantic, "I Don't Want You to Go" was called "the best of the lot" by the Philippine Headline News Online.
- In 1999, Martin Nievera covered the song on his eleventh studio album Forever, Forever.
- In 2007, Mark Bautista covered the song on his third studio album Every Now and Then. The Philippine Daily Inquirer offered a mixed review of Bautista's performance of the song, calling it "serviceable", but describing it as "emotionally pared down." The same year, Kyla covered the song for her sixth studio album Heartfelt.
- In 2009, Piolo Pascual covered the song for the soundtrack to the film Love Me Again. The same year on October 25, 2009, Regine Velasquez performed the song for the television program SOP.
