= Switch (Switch album) =

Studio album by Switch
- Released: June 17, 1978
- Recorded: 1977–1978
- Genre: R&B, soul
- Length: 32:19
- Label: Gordy
- Producer: Jermaine Jackson, Bobby DeBarge, Gregory Williams, Jody Sims, Greg Wright, The Bewley Brothers, Michael B. Sutton,

Switch chronology
Pall Mall Groove (1977)	Switch (1978)	Switch II (1979)

Professional ratings
Review scores
Source	Rating
AllMusic	4/5 stars

Switch is the first album by R&B band Switch, released in 1978. It is also their first on the Motown subsidiary Gordy. After recording as White Heat and Hot Ice, this gave them the commercial breakthrough they desired with hits like "There'll Never Be" and "I Wanna Be Closer".

== Track listing ==
1. "I Wanna Be with You" (Bobby DeBarge)
2. "There'll Never Be" (Bobby DeBarge)
3. "I Wanna Be Closer" (Jermaine Jackson)
4. "We Like to Party... Come On" (Bobby DeBarge, Gregory Williams)
5. "Fever" (Greg Wright, Ronnie Vann)
6. "You Pulled a Switch" (Greg Wright, Ronnie Vann)
7. "It's So Real" (Michael B. Sutton, Brenda Sutton)
8. "Somebody's Watching You" (Jody Sims)

== Personnel ==
Switch

- Bobby DeBarge - lead vocals, backing vocals, keyboards, drums
- Tommy DeBarge - bass, backing vocals
- Phillip Ingram - lead vocals, keyboards, percussion, backing vocals
- Jody Sims - drums, percussion, backing vocals
- Gregory Williams - trumpet, keyboards, backing vocals
- Eddie Fluellen - keyboards, string ensemble, trombone, backing vocals

Guitarists

- Lil' David Podis, Mike McGloiry, Ronnie Vann - guitar

Additional musicians

- Jermaine Jackson

== Charts ==
Chart (1978)	Peak position
US Top LPs & Tape	37
US Top Soul LPs	6

=== Singles ===
Year	Single	Chart positions	
Year	Single	US	US R&B
1978	"There'll Never Be"	36	6
