= This Is My Dream =

Studio album by Switch
- Released: November 1980
- Recorded: 1980
- Genre: R&B
- Label: Gordy Records
- Producer: Bobby DeBarge, Gregory Williams, Jody Sims

Switch chronology
Reaching for Tomorrow (1980)	This Is My Dream (1980)	Switch V (1981)

This Is My Dream is the fourth album by R&B group Switch. It was released in 1980. This is also the only album during their tenure with Motown not to feature input from Jermaine Jackson; they produced this album themselves.

Following the release of their third album, Reaching for Tomorrow, in 1980, the group released This Is My Dream, their fourth album, later that same year. It included the top-ten hit "Love Over And Over Again", which Bobby DeBarge wrote with his sister and future DeBarge member Bunny DeBarge.

== Charts ==
Year	Chart positions	
Year	US	US R&B
1980-1981	85	21

=== Singles ===
Year	Single	Chart positions		
Year	Single	US	US R&B	US Dance
1981	"You & I"	—	57	—

== Track listing ==
1. "Believe In Yourself" (Jody Sims)
2. "Love Over And Over Again" (Bobby DeBarge, Bunny DeBarge)
3. "Just Imagine" (Gregory Williams, Lee Garrett)
4. "All I Need Is You" (Bobby DeBarge)
5. "You And I" (Bobby DeBarge, Gregory Williams)
6. "What A Feeling" (Gregory Williams)
7. "Without You In My Life" (Gregory Williams)
8. "Why'd You Let Love Fall" (Bobby DeBarge, Bunny DeBarge)
9. "We Can Make It Better" (Eddie Fluellen)
10. "This Is My Dream" (Bobby DeBarge, Bunny DeBarge)
