= Stay the Night (Billy Ocean song) =

- Artwork for the Dutch vinyl release

Single by Billy Ocean

from the album City Limit
- B-side: "What You Doing to Me"
- Released: 1980
- Genre: Pop; R&B; soul; dance; disco
- Length: 3:32
- Label: GTO
- Songwriter(s): Ken Gold; Billy Ocean
- Producer(s): Ken Gold

Billy Ocean singles chronology
"Are You Ready" (1980)	"Stay the Night" (1980)	"Nights (Feel Like Getting Down)" (1981)

"Stay the Night" is a 1980 song by Billy Ocean taken from his 1980 album City Limit. It was released as the follow-up to his hit single "Are You Ready?", and was also released as the B-side to this single in some countries. The song has been covered by La Toya Jackson and sampled by dance artist Lady on the 2002 Brazilian hit single "Easy Love".

== La Toya Jackson version ==
"Stay the Night"

Single by La Toya Jackson

from the album My Special Love
- B-side: "Camp Kuchi Kaiai"
- Released: 1981
- Genre: Pop; funk; R&B; soul; boogie
- Length: 5:37 (album version); 3:39 (single edit)
- Label: Polydor
- Songwriter(s): Ken Gold; Billy Ocean
- Producer(s): Ollie E. Brown

La Toya Jackson singles chronology
"Night Time Lover" (1980)	"Stay the Night" (1981)	"I Don't Want You to Go" (1981)

"Stay the Night" was covered by American singer La Toya Jackson, and released as the first single from her second studio album, My Special Love (1981). The track was produced by Ollie E. Brown, who also produced the album. The lyrics were slightly re-written to reflect the gender change from Ocean's version.

The single peaked at #31 on the Billboard Hot Soul Singles chart. The single was released on 7" and 12" formats, with "Camp Kuchi Kaiai" on the B-side.

"Camp Kuchi Kaiai" was one of two songs Jackson co-wrote with her sister Janet Jackson; the other was "Lovely Is She" on Jackson's previous album. "Camp Kuchi Kaiai" has become well known in the UK's rare groove scene.

Jackson performed "Stay the Night" on the October 10, 1981 episode of Soul Train.

=== Charts ===
Chart performance for "Stay the Night"
Chart (1981)	Peak position
US Cash Box Black Contemporary Top 100	33
US Hot R&B/Hip-Hop Songs (Billboard)	31
