= Am I Still Your Boyfriend? =

Studio album by Switch
- Released: August 16, 1984
- Studio: Total Experience Recording Studios (Hollywood, California)
- Genre: R&B
- Label: Total Experience Records
- Producer: Oliver Scott, Lonnie Simmons, Jonah Ellis, Gregory Williams, Jody Sims

Switch chronology
Switch V (1981)	Am I Still Your Boyfriend? (1984)

Am I Still Your Boyfriend? is the sixth and final album from R&B band Switch. Released in 1984, this album includes new band members Renard Gallo and Gonzales Ozen.

== Track listing ==
=== Side A ===
1. "I'm So Satisfied" (O. Scott) (4:04)
2. "Switch It Baby" (J. Ellis) (4:24)
3. "It's All Up to You" (O. Scott; G. Ozen) (3:57)
4. "Lovers Don't Hold Back" (G. Williams; R. Hickman) (4:28)
5. "Keeping Secrets" (O. Scott; G. Ozen) (4:13)

=== Side B ===
1. "Treason" (O. Scott; G. Ozen; A. Hampton) (3:49)
2. "Am I Still Your Boyfriend" (O. Scott) (4:12)
3. "Just Can't Pull Away" (J. Ellis) (4:37)
4. "I Won't Give Up" (O. Scott) (3:43)
5. "Spend My Life with You" (W.C. Wellman; M. Norfleet; C. Thompson) (4:24)
6. "Forever My Love" (E. Fluellen) (1:53)

== Personnel ==
- Renard Gallo: vocals, percussion
- Gonzales Ozen: vocals, percussion
- Gregory Williams: keyboards, vocals
- Eddie Fluellen: keyboards, trombone, vocals
- Jody Sims: drums, percussion, vocals
