= La Toya Jackson (album) =

Studio album by La Toya Jackson
- Released: September 1980
- Length: 39:09
- Labels: Polydor; Cherry Pop
- Producers: Michael Jackson; Larry Farrow; Ollie E. Brown

La Toya Jackson chronology
La Toya Jackson (1980)	My Special Love (1981)

Singles from La Toya Jackson
- 1. "If You Feel the Funk" Released: May 26, 1980; 2. "Night Time Lover" Released: August 1, 1980

La Toya Jackson is the 1980 debut album from American singer-songwriter La Toya Jackson. It was released in America and mainland Europe. The album is most known for "Night Time Lover", a track produced by La Toya's brother Michael Jackson, who provides background vocals on the refrain.

== Album information ==
To distinguish herself from her famous brothers, The Jacksons, La Toya wanted only her first name on the album. "I begged just to have it 'La Toya'. But my father said, 'It's your last name. You got to use it.' But I wanted to see what I could do as an individual." The album was re-issued on CD in Japan in 1992. A successful petition was launched by her fans at ChurchofLaToya.com to persuade the label Cherry Pop to re-release her debut album on CD for the first time in the UK. It was re-released on May 22, 2006.

== Reception ==
Professional ratings
Review scores
Source	Rating
AllMusic	3/5 stars
Billboard	(favourable)
The Evening Independent	(favorable)

Billboard noted that "the pretty younger sister of the singing Jacksons debuts here with a well-produced set of crossover pop soul. The mix of tempos complements Jackson's versatile style...her singing, especially on some of the subdued ballads, conveys much soul."

Cashbox stated that "The Jackson's little sis' has gladly received the help of such L.A. area heavies as Stevie Wonder, Ray Parker, Patrice Rushen and brother Michael guide her through that crucial debut release. Via superb coaching and backing from some strong session players, La Toya's little girl voice should become a B/C radio staple. Lots of strong cuts on the disc, but the songs produced by Michael Jackson, "If You Feel The Funk" and "Night Time Lover" are the most infectious."

In its review, The Evening Independent said that Jackson has "an attractive, pleasant voice that is mature and controlled." Allmusic said Jackson "has an obvious enthusiasm for the songs that comes through consistently. That factor, along with the strong cast of musicians and some memorable tunes, makes this an overall enjoyable set."

== Charts ==
The album peaked at #116 on the Billboard 200, #26 on the Billboard Top Black Albums chart, and #178 in the UK. It spawned two singles: "If You Feel the Funk" and "Night Time Lover".

"If You Feel the Funk" performed modestly on the charts, narrowly missing out on the Billboard Hot 100 at #101. However, it peaked at #17 on the Billboard Dance/Club Play chart and #40 on the Billboard R&B chart. It also reached #42 in Germany and #18 in the Netherlands. "If You Feel the Funk" was also released as a 12" single in the United Kingdom where it failed to chart. The follow-up single, "Night Time Lover" failed to generate attention, despite brother Michael singing on the track (who was at the time generating critical and public acclaim for his album Off the Wall). It peaked at #59 on the Billboard R&B chart.

== Track listing ==
No.	Title	Writer(s)	Producer(s)	Length
1.	"If You Feel the Funk"	Dorie Pride, Kamau Peterson	Ollie E. Brown	5:01
2.	"Save Your Love"	Carolyn Johns, Larry Farrow	Larry Farrow	3:47
3.	"My Love Has Passed You By"	Dorie Pride, Kamau Peterson	Ollie E. Brown	4:10
4.	"Are You Ready?"	Billy Ocean, Ken Gold	Ollie E. Brown	4:44
5.	"Night Time Lover"	La Toya Jackson, Michael Jackson	Michael Jackson	3:44
6.	"A Taste of You (Is a Taste of Love)"	Ernie Smith, Greg Perry, Terry Harrison	Ollie E. Brown	4:27
7.	"Lovely Is She"	Janet Jackson, La Toya Jackson	Ollie E. Brown	4:23
8.	"If I Ain't Got It"	Carolyn Johns, Larry Farrow	Larry Farrow	4:52

== Personnel ==
- La Toya Jackson – lead vocals
- Michael Jackson – co-lead vocals
- Darren Carmichael, Bill Champlin, Lynn Davis, Marva Holcolm, Josie James, Deborah Thomas, Arnell Carmichael – backing vocals
- Freddie "Ready Freddie" Washington, Nathan Watts, Rick Chudacoff, Kevin Brandon – bass
- Ollie E. Brown, James Gadson, Jeff Porcaro, Dorie Pride, Eddie "Bongo" Brown, Paulinho da Costa – drums, percussion
- David E. Williams, Greg Poree, Ray Parker Jr., Paul Jackson, Jr., Jay Graydon, Marlo Henderson – guitar
- Arnell Carmichael – hand clapping
- Stevie Wonder – harmonica
- George Bohanon, Oscar Brashear, Michael Davis, Mic Gillette, Gary Herbig, Alan Kaplan, John Kelson Jr., Doc Kupka, Arthur Maebe, Ollie Mitchell, Don Myrick, Billy Page, Lenny Pickett, Louis Satterfield, Henry Sigismonti, Maurice Spears, Tom Washington – horns
- Gene Page – string and horn arrangements
- Kim Bullard, Clarence McDonald, Sylvester Rivers, Patrice Rushen – keyboards

== Charts ==
Chart (1980)	Peak position
US Billboard 200	116
US Billboard Top Black Albums	26
US Cash Box Top 200	124
US Cash Box Black Contemporary Top 75	30
