= Matt Hardy 999 =

2021 song by Trippie Redd

Song by Trippie Redd and Juice Wrld

from the album Trip at Knight
- Released: 20 August 2021
- Recorded: 2018–2021
- Genre: Cloud rap; trap; rage
- Length: 3:08
- Label: 1400 Entertainment; 10k
- Songwriters: Michael White; Jarad Higgins; Mendo; Tobias Dekker; Magnus Høiberg; Aaron Shadrow; Jasper Harris; Jean Christophe Marie
- Producers: Cashmere Cat; Star Boy; Outtatown; Aaron Shadrow; Jasper Harris; Rip

Music video
- "Matt Hardy 999" on YouTube

"Matt Hardy 999" is a song by American rappers Trippie Redd and Juice Wrld. It was released on August 20, 2021, as the tenth song from the former's fourth studio album, Trip at Knight.

== Background ==
"Matt Hardy 999" is a reworked version of a previously leaked song. The track was initially teased within a YouTube interview with No Jumper in September 2018. It was then leaked in full on 23 January 2020. On 14 July 2021, a snippet of a new, shortened version of the song was leaked. It featured a new rage instrumental. The song – named after American wrestler Matt Hardy – was then released with the album later that year.

== Reception ==
Matt Hardy himself acknowledged the reference to him in the song and its title, tweeting: "It's very flattering that [Juice Wrld] named one of his final raps after me. It's nice to be honored for all of the sacrifices I've made for people's entertainment over the years. #RIPJUICEWRLD". He added: "I didn't [initially know about the song before its release]. Not until people started buzzing me on it."

== Charts ==
Weekly chart performance for "Matt Hardy 999"
Chart (2021)	Peak position
Canada Hot 100 (Billboard)	54
Global 200 (Billboard)	60
New Zealand (Recorded Music NZ)	12
UK Singles (Official Charts)	82
US Billboard Hot 100	49
US Hot R&B/Hip-Hop Songs (Billboard)	14

== Certifications ==
Certifications for "Matt Hardy 999"
Region	Certification	Certified units/sales
United States (RIAA)	Gold	500,000^{‡}
^{‡} Sales+streaming figures based on certification alone.
