= Reaching for Tomorrow =

Studio album by Switch
- Released: March 1980
- Recorded: 1979–1980
- Studio: Jennifudy Studios, North Hollywood, California; Motown/Hitsville U.S.A. Studios, Hollywood, California; Caribou Ranch, Nederland, Colorado
- Genre: R&B
- Label: Gordy Records
- Producer: Bobby DeBarge, Gregory Williams, Tommy DeBarge, Jody Sims, Jermaine Jackson

Switch chronology
Switch II (1979)	Reaching for Tomorrow (1980)	This Is My Dream (1980)

Professional ratings
Review scores
Source	Rating
AllMusic	2/5 stars

Reaching for Tomorrow is the third album by R&B/funk band Switch, released in 1980 by Gordy Records. The album reached No. 23 on the Billboard Top Soul Albums chart.

== Overview ==
Reaching for Tomorrow was recorded at Jennifudy Recording Studio, Motown/Hitsville U.S.A. studios, Caribou Ranch studios and Kendun Recording Studios.

During July 2019, an expanded edition of Reaching for Tomorrow was released digitally. Along with the album's reissue came a bonus track entitled "Tahiti Hut" featuring Jermaine Jackson. The song was produced by Jackson with Bobby DeBarge also singing falsetto on the track.

== Critical reception ==
The album received positive reviews from music critics.

Cashbox Magazine describes the album: "The band throws everything but the kitchen sink into this album – funky bass, rockin’ guitar, classical strings, Memphis Horns et al – and it is a must for R&B and pop programmers."

Barry Lederer of Billboard writes "Switch has come full swing with a humdinger of an LP titled "Reaching For Tomorrow" which blends r &b /funk to perfection. From full arrangements, bright orchestrations and tight vocalizations, the group swings from one cut to another."

Billboard features Reaching for Tomorrow on its Top Album Picks for 29 March 1980. The six -member group keeps the tempo danceable on its latest LP, sparking the tunes with sizzling rhythm, string and horn arrangements.

Sal Caputo of the Courier-News writes: "Switch offers a pleasant mix of funk, pop, rock psychedelia and dance beat. It trades vocals with verve. Its arrangements change textures enough to undercut the weight of repetition."

Paul Willistein Jr. of The Morning Call commended the “Super-fast rhythms, intricate guitar riffs and astonishing vocals” as setting Switch apart from most disco funk bands and said their reliance on R&B over disco is what makes Motown artists top charts. He noted the "amazing voices" on the title track and “impressive string arrangements”.

== Track listing ==
1. "Power to Dance" (Bobby DeBarge, Bunny DeBarge)
2. "My Friend in the Sky" (Bobby DeBarge, Bunny DeBarge)
3. "Don't Take My Love Away" (Bobby DeBarge)
4. "Keep Movin' On" (Gregory Williams)
5. "A Brighter Tomorrow" (Eddie Fluellen, Hazel Jackson, Jermaine Jackson)
6. "Reaching for Tomorrow" (Jermaine Jackson, Paul M. Jackson, Jr., Roxanne Seeman)
7. "I Finally Found Somebody New" (Tommy DeBarge)
8. "Honey, I Love You" (Jody Sims)
9. "Get Back to You" (Gregory Williams, Jody Sims)
10. "Tahiti Hut" (Maurice White, Eumir Deodato, Roxanne Seeman) (feat. Jermaine Jackson) (bonus track on expanded edition) 5:18

== Charts ==
Chart (1980)	Peak position
US Top LPs & Tape	57
US Top Soul LPs	23
