= If You Feel the Funk =

Single by La Toya Jackson

from the album La Toya Jackson
- Released: 1980
- Genre: Pop; funk
- Length: 5:00 (album version); 4:09 (single version)
- Label: Polydor
- Songwriter(s): Dorie Pride; Kamau Peterson
- Producer(s): Ollie E. Brown

La Toya Jackson singles chronology
"If You Feel the Funk" (1980)	"Night Time Lover" (1980)

"If You Feel the Funk" is a song by American singer La Toya Jackson, released as the first single from her eponymous debut album (1980). It was released in three versions, with "Are You Ready?", "Lovely Is She" and "Night Time Lover" on the B-side (all three were album tracks; "Night Time Lover" was later released as a single).

The single narrowly missed the US Billboard Hot 100, peaking at number 103. However, it peaked at number 17 on Billboard's Disco Top 100 chart and number 40 on the Hot Soul Singles chart. Outside the US, "If You Feel the Funk" reached number 42 in Germany, number 13 in the Netherlands, and number 9 in Belgium.

Jackson performed "If You Feel the Funk" as well as "Are You Ready" on the November 8, 1980 episode of Soul Train. She performed "If You Feel the Funk" on the December 13, 1980 episode of American Bandstand. In Europe, the number was performed on the December 13, 1980 episode of Dutch program TopPop and on the February 12, 1981 episode of Musikladen.

== Charts ==
Chart performance for "If You Feel the Funk"
Chart (1980)	Peak position
Belgium (Ultratop 50 Flanders)	9
Germany (GfK)	42
Netherlands (Single Top 100)	13
UK Singles (Record Business)	100
US Bubbling Under Hot 100 (Billboard)	3
US Cash Box Black Contemporary Top 100	52
US Disco Top 100	17
US Hot R&B/Hip-Hop Songs (Billboard)	40
