= Miss the Rage =

2021 single by Trippie Redd and Playboi Carti

Single by Trippie Redd and Playboi Carti

from the album Trip at Knight
- Released: May 7, 2021
- Recorded: 2020–2021
- Genre: Hip-hop
- Length: 3:58
- Label: 1400 Entertainments; 10k
- Songwriters: Michael White; Jordan Carter; Cas van der Heijden
- Producer: Loesoe

Trippie Redd singles chronology
"Honorable Flex" (2020)	"Miss the Rage" (2021)	"Holy Smokes" (2021)

Playboi Carti singles chronology
"@ Meh" (2020)	"Miss the Rage" (2021)	"Unlock It" (2021)

Lyric video
- "Miss The Rage" on YouTube

Music video
- "Miss The Rage" on YouTube

"Miss the Rage" is a song by the American rappers Trippie Redd and Playboi Carti. It was released on May 7, 2021, as the lead single for Redd's album, Trip at Knight. The song was written alongside Loesoe, who produced the track. Peaking at number 11, it is Redd's highest-charting song on the Billboard Hot 100.

== Background ==
Trippie originally teased the track on Instagram in December 2020. Later, an edit of the song containing Playboi Carti's vocals from "Want To" (his leaked collaboration with the late Juice Wrld) atop the song's beat, went viral on TikTok. The popularity of the edit led to Trippie asking Carti to feature on the track. The cover art and release date were revealed on May 3, 2021. The song's title also became a motto on Trippie's social media posts.

The song's title refers to the act of missing the rage Trippie Redd experienced while performing at concerts, due to the COVID-19 pandemic. Trippie explained: "I been locked away. I'm one of them people that's at the festivals, I come out going crazy out the rips. I'm ready to get back to my stage presence. I'm tired of this shit. I'm tired of sitting in the house 'cause that's all I been doing. With all the COVID shit going on, I was just in my creative space making music that I really fucked with". The song has been deemed a "high octane" track.

== Music video ==
A lyric video was released on May 7, 2021, on Trippie's YouTube channel. Later on May 27, 2021, an official music video featuring both Trippie Redd and Playboi Carti was released. It features both artists in a junk yard destroying a car and other various items.

== Charts ==
=== Weekly charts ===
Weekly chart performance for "Miss the Rage"
Chart (2021)	Peak position
Australia (ARIA)	31
Belgium (Ultratip Bubbling Under Flanders)	25
Canada Hot 100 (Billboard)	15
Czech Republic Singles Digital (ČNS IFPI)	46
France (SNEP)	132
Germany (GfK)	87
Global 200 (Billboard)	13
Iceland (Tónlistinn)	24
Ireland (IRMA)	28
Lithuania (AGATA)	12
Netherlands (Single Top 100)	72
New Zealand (Recorded Music NZ)	18
Portugal (AFP)	42
Slovakia (Singles Digitál Top 100)	25
Sweden Heatseeker (Sverigetopplistan)	3
Switzerland (Schweizer Hitparade)	30
UK Singles (Official Charts)	32
UK Hip Hop/R&B (Official Charts)	14
US Billboard Hot 100	11
US Hot R&B/Hip-Hop Songs (Billboard)	6
US Rhythmic Airplay (Billboard)	38

=== Year-end charts ===
Year-end chart performance for "Miss the Rage"
Chart (2021)	Position
US Hot R&B/Hip-Hop Songs (Billboard)	61

== Certifications ==
Certifications for "Miss the Rage"
Region	Certification	Certified units/sales
Brazil (Pro-Música Brasil)	2× Platinum	80,000^{‡}
Canada (Music Canada)	2× Platinum	160,000^{‡}
New Zealand (RMNZ)	Platinum	30,000^{‡}
Poland (ZPAV)	Gold	25,000^{‡}
United Kingdom (BPI)	Silver	200,000^{‡}
United States (RIAA)	Platinum	1,000,000^{‡}
^{‡} Sales+streaming figures based on certification alone.
