= First Draft (EP) =

EP by Trippie Redd
- Released: 30 September 2022
- Recorded: 2019–2022
- Genre: Emo-rap
- Length: 4:34
- Label: 10K Projects
- Producer: Angel López; Igor Mamet; Jarom Su'a; RRAREBEAR

Trippie Redd chronology
Hate Is Dead (2021)	First Draft (2022)	Mansion Musik (2023)

First Draft is the ninth extended play by American rapper Trippie Redd, released on 30 September 2022 through 10K Projects. The project was solely made available by streaming, and serves as a teaser for the rapper's sixth commercial mixtape A Love Letter to You 5 (2023). Production was primarily handled by Igor Mamet, alongside RRAREBEAR, Angel López and Jarom Su'a. In First Draft, Trippie Redd experiments with a more introspective, minimal musical approach. One critic wrote that the EP "see[s] him going in a more acoustic direction with pained vocals." The project was well-received critically.

== Background and promotion ==
Two days before the surprise release of First Draft, Trippie Redd revealed the cover arts for both of its tracks, alongside a pre-save link. On the date of the EP’s release, 30 September 2022, Redd released the Nolan Riddle-directed music video for "Save Me, Please".

== Songs ==
With the first track, "Save Me, Please", Trippie Redd makes a plea to a lover to come back to him and save him from himself. The creative process for the guitar-infused song began in 2019. A snippet of it was shared in 2022 before the release of its parent EP. "First Degree Murder" serves as the second and final track on the EP. Over another melodic instrumental, Redd vows to commit murder against anyone who hurts or disrespects his partner. The song was originally intended to be released on A Love Letter to You 5.

== Critical reception ==
Gabriel Bras Nevares of HotNewHipHop wrote that the release of First Draft further emphasised his sonic versatility. Regarding "Save Me, Please", Nevares noted his appreciation for the song’s instrumentation and vocal, surmising: "[i]t's a short moment, but a tender one nonetheless." Commenting on "First Degree Murder", Nevares opined: "[t]his track, however, has much more of a melodic trap flavor than the first, with a wavy snap beat and an impassioned vocal delivery that gets the melody stuck in your head."

Joey Ech of XXL noted that "Save Me, Please" "prominently features an acoustic guitar riff that allows for Trippie Redd's somber vocals to shine reminiscent of a track from a traditional singer-songwriter." Ech also recorded that reactions to the EP on social media were "primarily positive".

== Track listing ==
First Draft track listing
No.	Title	Writer(s)	Producer(s)	Length
1.	"Save Me, Please"	Michael Lamar White IV; Igor Mamet	RRAREBEAR; Igor Mamet	2:08
2.	"First Degree Murder"	Michael Lamar White IV; Igor Mamet; Angel López; Malachi Cohen; Brian Lee; Melvin Ray Moore III	Angel López; Jarom Su'a; Igor Mamet	2:26
Total length:				4:34
