= Switch II =

Studio album by Switch
- Released: April 1979
- Genre: R&B
- Label: Gordy
- Producer: Jermaine Jackson, Bobby DeBarge, Gregory Williams

Switch chronology
Switch (1978)	Switch II (1979)	Reaching for Tomorrow (1980)

Professional ratings
Review scores
Source	Rating
AllMusic	4/5 stars
The Virgin Encyclopedia of R&B and Soul	3/5 stars

Switch II is the second album by the R&B group Switch, released in 1979. Included on the album is one of the band's biggest and most often-sampled hits "I Call Your Name".

== Track listing ==
1. "You're the One for Me" (Bobby DeBarge, Elaine Brown, Phillip Ingram) – 4:29
2. "Next to You" (Greg Williams) – 4:11
3. "Best Beat in Town" (Bobby DeBarge) – 4:48
4. "Calling On All Girls" (Hazel Jackson, Jermaine Jackson, Maureen Bailey) – 4:34
5. "Go On Doin' What You Feel" (Jermaine Jackson, Maureen Bailey, Michael Smith) – 5:39
6. "Fallin'" (Greg Williams) – 5:47
7. "I Call Your Name" (Bobby DeBarge, Greg Williams) – 7:33

== Charts ==
=== Weekly charts ===
Chart (1979)	Peak position
US Billboard 200	37
US Top R&B/Hip-Hop Albums (Billboard)	8

=== Year-end charts ===
Chart (1979)	Position
US Top R&B/Hip-Hop Albums (Billboard)	19
Chart (1980)	Position
US Top R&B/Hip-Hop Albums (Billboard)	46

=== Singles ===
Year	Single	Chart positions		
Year	Single	US	US R&B	US Dance
1979	"Best Beat In Town"	69	16	65
1979	"I Call Your Name"	83	8	—
