= K Suave =

American rapper

- Born: Kevin Gainer; December 4, 1997 (age 28); Cleveland, Ohio, U.S.
- Origin: Akron, Ohio, U.S.
- Genres: Hip hop; trap
- Occupations: Rapper; singer; songwriter
- Instrument: Vocals
- Years active: 2018–present
- Labels: 1400 Entertainment; 1400/800; Slayer Academy

Kevin Gainer (born December 4, 1997), known professionally as K Suave, is an American rapper, singer and songwriter.

== Career ==
In April 2020, Gainer released his mixtape B4 the SexTape. In July 2020, he released his mixtape Love Sick. In September 2020, he released his mixtape 7 Minutes in Heaven. In December 2020, he released his mixtape Thot Slayer 2. In April 2021, he and fellow rapper Ely Nash released a music video for their collaborative single "Blood on the Opps". In May 2021, Gainer released his single "Sexually Active" with American rapper Trippie Redd, which used the same loop as Trippie's song "Miss the Rage". In September 2021, he toured alongside Trippie Redd as part of the latter's Trip at Knight tour. In November 2021, he appeared on D. Savage's album BPL. In December 2021, he released his project Sexually Active which included appearances from Trippie Redd, as well as fellow rappers Autumn, D. Savage, Kankan, Buddah Bands, KobeNoBryant and Zelly Ocho. Also in December 2021, he appeared on Trippie's mixtape Hate Is Dead. In May 2022, he released his single "DayCare" alongside a music video directed by American director DotComNirvan. In July 2022, Gainer performed alongside Trippie Redd at the Brixton Academy in London.

== Musical style ==
Gainer is noted as using heavily distorted synth samples in his songs.

== Discography ==
=== Mixtapes ===
Title	Mixtape details
Thot Slayer	Released: December 16, 2018; Label: Slayer Records; Format: Digital download, streaming
B4 the SexTape	Released: April 6, 2020; Label: 1400/800; Format: Digital download, streaming
Love Sick	Released: July 23, 2020; Labels: 1400/800; Formats: Digital download, streaming
7 Minutes in Heaven	Released: September 23, 2020; Label: Slayer Academy/1400/800; Format: Digital download, streaming
Thot Slayer 2	Released: December 16, 2020; Label: Slayer Academy/1400/800; Format: Digital download, streaming
Thot Slayer 2 Deluxe	Released: January 15, 2021; Label: Slayer Academy/1400/800; Format: Digital download, streaming
Sexually Active	Released: December 3, 2021; Label: Slayer Academy/1400/800; Format: Digital download, streaming
Hit Me When You Land	Released: December 16, 2022; Label: Slayer Academy/1400/800; Format: Digital download, streaming
Midnight in Malibu	Released: August 25, 2023; Label: Slayer Academy/1400/800; Format: Digital download, streaming
It Was Never Serious	Released: July 26, 2024; Label: Slayer Academy/1400/800; Format: Digital download, streaming
