= Phillip Ingram =

American singer-songwriter

- Born: 1958 (age 67–68); Akron, Ohio, United States
- Origin: Reseda, California, United States
- Genres: R&B, soul, pop jazz
- Occupations: Singer, songwriter, record producer
- Instruments: Vocals, piano, keyboards, guitar, bass guitar, drums
- Years active: 1975–present
- Labels: Qwest, Motown

Phillip Ingram (born 1958) is an American musician. He is perhaps best known as one of the founding members of the Motown Group Switch and is the younger brother of James Ingram.

== Biography ==
Ingram was raised in Akron, Ohio. He came from a musical family with six brothers and sisters who all sang and played instruments but only Phillip and his older brother, James, pursued a musical career.

In December 1976, the band Switch was formed with Phillip Ingram, Greg Williams, Jody Sims, Bobby DeBarge, Tommy DeBarge and Eddie Fluellen.

Switch was signed to the Gordy subsidiary of Motown Records in May 1977 and went on to record five albums for the label, with Ingram sharing lead vocal duties with Bobby DeBarge.

Starting in 1984, Ingram went behind the scenes writing for various artists and working with various artists, films and commercials.

He still sings and records for television and radio commercials, works on films, radio station IDs, and recordings. In addition, he is working on production of new and upcoming artists along with Rex Salas. He has toured with Sheena Easton and a new incarnation of Switch.

== College voice instructor ==
Ingram was a faculty member at the California College of Music (CCM) in Pasadena, California, and taught vocal lessons twice a week with their Vocal Arts Program.

== Personal life ==
Ingram has been married twice and lives with his second wife, Rebecca, in Reseda, California. Both are Jehovah's Witnesses, Ingram being an elder in his local congregation, as well as a pioneer, a person who devotes over 50 hours a month to the Jehovah's Witnesses evangelism.

== Discography ==
=== Albums ===
- 1983: Fresh Idea – (with Attala Zane Giles, credited as Deco) (Qwest Records)

=== Soundtracks ===
- Back to School (1986)
- The Little Mermaid (1989)
- The Neverending Story III (1994)
- Father of the Bride Part II (1995)
- My Best Friend's Wedding (1997)
- The Fearless Four (1997)
- The Prince of Egypt (1998)
- Follow Your Heart (1999)
- Dinosaur (2000)
- Shrek (2001)
- Brother Bear 2 (2006)
