= Switch (band) =

American R&B/funk band

- Left to right: Tommy DeBarge, Phillip Ingram, Bobby DeBarge, Eddie Fluellen, Gregory Williams, Jody Sims

Background information
- Also known as: White Heat (1974–1976); Hot-Ice (1976)
- Origin: Mansfield, Ohio, U.S.
- Genres: R&B, funk
- Years active: 1974–present
- Labels: RCA, Polydor, Gordy (Motown), Total Experience
- Members: Gregory Williams; Phillip Ingram; Michael McGloiry; Akili Nickson; Michael Norfleet; Tefere Hazy; James Strong
- Past members: See below

Switch is an American R&B/funk band that recorded for the Gordy label in the late 1970s, releasing songs such as "There'll Never Be", "I Call Your Name", and "Love Over & Over Again". Switch influenced bands such as DeBarge, which featured the siblings of Switch band members Bobby and Tommy DeBarge.

== Biography ==
=== Early years ===
Switch was formed in Mansfield, Ohio in 1977. The band initially included Gregory Williams, Bobby DeBarge, and Tommy DeBarge, from Grand Rapids, Michigan, as well as Jody Sims, originally from Steubenville, Ohio. The band began as a spinoff of previous act White Heat, which released a self-titled album on RCA in 1975, but the band's producer, Barry White, soon shuttered his Soul Unlimited production company and dropped all the acts on the roster. The band then recorded Pall Mall Groove in October 1976 under the name Hot-Ice, which was released in early 1977 in Germany only. After the album failed to reach the group's expectations for success, Hot-Ice split up. However, when the DeBarge brothers, Williams, and Sims returned to Ohio, they regrouped under the name Switch along with Akron, Ohio natives Phillip Ingram (co-lead vocals/keyboards) and Eddie Fluellen (keyboards/trombone). With the financial assistance of Bernd Lichters, producer of Pall Mall Groove, Switch recorded a demo in 1977.

=== Success years ===
The name 'Switch' was chosen due to multiple of the group's members' multi-instrumental abilities. Following the recording of the demo, Williams and Sims flew to Los Angeles and, by chance, got the attention of Jermaine Jackson and Hazel Gordy (Jermaine's then-wife and daughter of Motown chief Berry Gordy Jr.), who heard the tape. Within weeks, the group was signed to the Gordy (Motown subsidiary) label. They recorded and released their self-titled debut album some 18 months later in 1978, which featured their first top 10 R&B hit single, entitled "There'll Never Be". The song also proved to be their biggest success on the Billboard Hot 100, where it was a top 40 hit (their only one), peaking at number 36.

Their songs were primarily written by Williams or Bobby DeBarge and occasionally by Sims or Jermaine Jackson. Though they never managed to achieve significant crossover success into the pop singles chart, they were a consistent presence on the R&B charts through the late 1970s with albums such as Switch II from 1979 (their second release), This Is My Dream and Reaching For Tomorrow in 1980. Songs such as "I Wanna Be Closer", "We Like to Party", "I Call Your Name", "Best Beat in Town", and "Love Over and Over Again" also became hits for the group. Bobby and Tommy DeBarge left Switch in 1981 to mentor their younger siblings in the group DeBarge, and they were replaced by vocalist Terrance Gaines and bassist/guitarist Attala Giles, respectively. The band's final release on Gordy was the ensuing album Switch V in 1981.

=== Later years ===
In 1983, other lead singer Ingram left to pursue a solo career. Williams, Fluellen and Sims reformed the group with vocalists Renard Gallo and Gonzales Ozen, and bassist Phil Upchurch Jr. This configuration of Switch signed with Total Experience Records (home of their contemporaries the Gap Band) and recorded a final album Am I Still Your Boyfriend? in 1984, breaking up later that year.

Williams briefly reformed Switch in 1985 with new members Anthony Watters (guitar), Christopher Hawkins (vocals), Charles Meyers (bass), and Howie Carbaugh (drums), getting little traction.

In 1991, Motown released a greatest hits compilation album by the band. A similar version on the 20th Century Masters series released more recently is all that remains in print of this band.

Former lead singer Bobby DeBarge died of AIDS-related complications in Grand Rapids, Michigan on August 16, 1995, at the age of 39.

In July 2003, the original 1977–1981 lineup of Switch (minus Bobby DeBarge) reunited on the Tom Joyner Morning Show, kickstarting new group activity. Switch has since reunited on a full time basis, featuring original members founder/leader Williams, Fluellen, Ingram, original sessions/on-stage guitarist Michael McGloiry, and new members Akili Nickson (lead vocals) and Michael Norfleet (keyboards/vocals). Tefere Hazy joined on drums in the 2010s, replacing Tony Moore (who in turn replaced Sims), and James Strong has replaced Tommy DeBarge on bass.

Former bass guitar player and backup singer Tommy DeBarge died on October 21, 2021, at age 64.

On April 14, 2025, it was announced on the official Stone City Band Facebook page that Eddie Fluellen had died. At one point in his career, Fluellen served as the musical director for the Stone City Band.

== Personnel ==
=== Current ===
- Gregory Williams – keyboards, trumpet, vocals (1974–1984, 1985–1986, 2003–present)
- Phillip Ingram – lead vocals, keyboards, percussion (1977–1983, 2003–present)
- Michael McGloiry – guitar (session member 1978–1981; official 2003–present)
- Akili Nickson – lead vocals (2003–present)
- Michael Norfleet – keyboards, vocals (2003–present)
- Tefere Hazy – drums (mid 2010s–present)
- James Strong – bass (between 2016 and 2019–present)
- Jody Sims – congas (guest 2020s–present) drums, vocals (1974–1984, 2000s)

=== Former ===
- Tommy DeBarge – bass, vocals (1974–1981, 2003–between 2016 and 2019; died 2021)
- Bobby DeBarge – lead vocals, keyboards, percussion, drums (1974–1981; died 1995)
- TC Brown – percussion, trumpet, vocals (1974–1976)
- Stanley Brown – guitar, vocals (1974–1976)
- Darnell Wyrick – saxophone, vocals (1974–1976)
- Arnett Hayes – keyboards, vocals (1974–1976)
- Stanley Hood – saxophone (1976)
- Eddie Fluellen – keyboards, trombone, vocals (1977–1984, 2003–2025; his death)
- Attala Giles – bass, guitar, keyboards (1981–1983)
- Terrance Gaines – lead vocals (1981–1983)
- Renard Gallo – lead vocals, percussion (1983–1984)
- Gonzales Ozen – lead vocals, percussion (1983–1984)
- Phil Upchurch, Jr. – bass (1983–1984)
- Christopher Hawkins – lead vocals (1985–1986)
- Anthony Watters – guitar, vocals (1985–1986)
- Charles Meyers – bass, vocals (1985–1986)
- Howie Carbaugh – drums (1985–1986)
- Tony Moore – drums (2000s–mid 2010s)

== Discography ==
=== Studio albums ===
Year	Album	Peak chart positions			Record label
Year	Album	US	US R&B	CAN	Record label
1975	White Heat (as White Heat)	–	–	–	RCA
1977	Pall Mall Groove (as Hot-Ice)	–	–	–	Polydor
1978	Switch	37	6	72	Gordy
1979	Switch II	37	8	84	Gordy
1980	Reaching for Tomorrow	57	23	—	Gordy
1980	This Is My Dream	85	21	—	Gordy
1981	Switch V	174	38	—	Gordy
1984	Am I Still Your Boyfriend?	—	63	—	Total Experience
"—" denotes a recording that did not chart or was not released in that territory.

=== Compilations ===
- The Best of Switch (1991, Motown)
- 20th Century Masters - The Millennium Collection: The Best of Switch (2001, Motown)

=== Singles ===
Year	Title	Peak chart positions					Album
Year	Title	US	US R&B	US Dan	CAN	UK	Album
1978	"There'll Never Be"	36	6	—	60	—	Switch
1979	"I Wanna Be Closer"	—	22	—	—	—	Switch
1979	"Best Beat in Town"	69	16	65	—	—	Switch II
1979	"I Call Your Name"	83	8	—	—	—	Switch II
1980	"Don't Take My Love Away"	—	41	—	—	—	Reaching for Tomorrow
1980	"Love Over and Over Again"	—	9	—	—	—	This Is My Dream
1981	"You and I"	—	57	—	—	—	This Is My Dream
1981	"I Do Love You"	—	73	—	—	—	Switch V
1982	"Call on Me"	—	70	—	—	—	Switch V
1984	"Switch It Baby"	—	55	—	—	—	Am I Still Your Boyfriend?
1984	"Keeping Secrets"	—	28	—	—	61	Am I Still Your Boyfriend?
"—" denotes a recording that did not chart or was not released in that territory.
