= A Love Letter to You mixtapes =

Mixtape series by Trippie Redd

Mixtape series by Trippie Redd
- Released: May 26, 2017 (A Love Letter to You); October 6, 2017 (A Love Letter to You 2); November 9, 2018 (A Love Letter to You 3); November 22, 2019 (A Love Letter to You 4); August 11, 2023 (A Love Letter to You 5)
- Genres: Hip hop; R&B; trap; emo rap; SoundCloud rap
- Labels: 10K Projects; Caroline Distribution; 1400 Entertainment
- Producer: Various

The A Love Letter to You mixtapes are a series of mixtapes by American rapper Trippie Redd. First released in 2017 with A Love Letter to You, there are a total of 5 mixtapes in the series with the most recent and final installment being A Love Letter to You 5 (2023). The albums have been released under labels such as 10K Projects, Caroline Distribution and 1400 Entertainment. Production duties on the albums were held by numerous producers, including OZ, Pi'erre Bourne, Nick Mira and Taz Taylor. There have been 58 features across the 5 mixtapes.

Discussing the difference between his mixtapes and albums in an interview with Lyrical Lemonade, Redd stated: “The only difference for me is that I’m in a record deal. For me, one project counts a year, and that would be whatever my album is. Anything I drop after that would just be considered a mixtape. A mixture of songs that don’t count towards my deal. I’m not obligated to make mixtapes at all, but I just do it for my fans.”

== Mixtapes in order ==
- A Love Letter to You (2017)
- A Love Letter to You 2 (2017)
- A Love Letter to You 3 (2018)
- A Love Letter to You 4 (2019)
- A Love Letter to You 5 (2023)

== Singles ==
The singles from A Love Letter to You are "Love Scars", released on November 24, 2016, "Poles 1469" (featuring 6ix9ine), released on April 27, 2017, and "It Takes Time", released on May 12, 2017. The singles from A Love Letter to You 2 are "Woah Woah Woah" (featuring Bali Baby), released on August 19, 2017, "I Know How to Self Destruct", released on August 19, 2017, "Bust Down", released on September 15, 2017, and "In Too Deep", released on September 27, 2017. The sole single from A Love Letter to You 3 is "Topanga", released on October 22, 2018.

The singles from A Love Letter to You 4 are "Love Me More", released on November 1, 2019, "Death" (featuring DaBaby), released on November 12, 2019, and "Who Needs Love", released on November 19, 2019. The singles from A Love Letter to You 4 (Deluxe) are "Yell Oh" (featuring Young Thug), released on February 7, 2020, and "The Way" (featuring Russ), released on February 19, 2020. The singles from A Love Letter to You 5 are "Took My Breath Away" (featuring Skye Morales), released on June 16, 2023, "Hurts Me" (with Tory Lanez), released on June 27, 2023, "Last Days" (with The Kid Laroi), released on July 25, 2023, "Left 4 Dead", released on August 4, 2023, and "Closed Doors" (with Roddy Ricch), released on August 11, 2023.

== Reception ==
Jon Barlas of Our Generation Music wrote that "Redd’s A Love Letter to You series is a testament to emo-rap’s influence in modern hip-hop, as the Ohio-bred emcee sits rightfully on the throne as one of the genre’s pioneers".
