= A Love Letter to You 4 =

Mixtape by Trippie Redd
- Released: November 22, 2019
- Genres: Hip-hop; emo rap; trap
- Length: 58:58
- Labels: 10K Projects; Caroline
- Producers: Angel Lopez; Bans; Cheeto; Chopsquad DJ; DJ Paul; FrankieOnTheGuitar; Hammad Beats; Icy Chill Out; Igor Mamet; KC Supreme; Kzuni; Mario Petersen; Murda Beatz; Nick Mira; Pearl Lion; Pi'erre Bourne; P. Soul; Repko; Scott Theft; SephGotTheWaves; Shadxw; Skuna; Starboy; StolenCable; Stunner Samples; Taz Taylor; Todd Pritch; TWhy Xclusive; Xeryus; WE ARE THE STARS; Wheezy

Trippie Redd chronology
! (2019)	A Love Letter to You 4 (2019)	Pegasus (2020)

A Love Letter to You mixtapes chronology
A Love Letter to You 3 (2018)	A Love Letter to You 4 (2019)	A Love Letter to You 5 (2023)

Original deluxe edition

5-Year Anniversary edition

Singles from A Love Letter to You 4
- 1. "Love Me More" Released: November 1, 2019; 2. "Death" Released: November 12, 2019; 3. "Who Needs Love" Released: November 19, 2019

Singles from A Love Letter to You 4 (Deluxe)
- 1. "Yell Oh" Released: February 7, 2020; 2. "The Way" Released: February 19, 2020

A Love Letter to You 4 (often abbreviated as ALLTY4) is the fourth commercial mixtape by American rapper Trippie Redd. It is also the fourth installment in the A Love Letter to You mixtape series. It was released on November 22, 2019, by TenThousand Projects and Caroline Distribution. The project features guest appearances from Lil Mosey, Juice Wrld, YNW Melly, Chris King, Quan'ta, YoungBoy Never Broke Again, Smokepurpp, Tory Lanez, DaBaby, Lil Yachty, Pi'erre Bourne, Youv Dee, Lil Wop, and Mariah the Scientist. The deluxe edition was released on February 21, 2020, featuring additional guest appearances from Chance the Rapper, Russ, Young Thug, Lil Tecca, Lil Durk, G Herbo, and SahBabii. Production was primarily handled by Pi'erre Bourne, Nick Mira, Taz Taylor, and Igor Mamet, among others.

A Love Letter to You 4 sees Trippie Redd delve further into hip hop and emo rap. One critic wrote: "Tireless and always emotionally charged, Trippie Redd's amalgamous approach to rap resulted in a web of trap beats, emo acoustic guitar lines, and lyrics sung in a tormented croon." Another opined that, in view of Redd's recent break-up with girlfriend Coi Leray, A Love Letter to You 4 is "about an unquantifiable catharsis". The album was supported by five singles: "Love Me More", "Death", "Who Needs Love", "Yell Oh" and "The Way". The record project was a massive commercial success, debuting at number one on the US Billboard 200 chart with 104,000 first-week album-equivalent units. It was also well-received by critics, who highlighted the project's sonic diversity. On October 8, 2020, A Love Letter to You 4 was certified Gold by the Recording Industry Association of America (RIAA). On July 21, 2021, the mixtape's certification was upgraded to Platinum. The 5-year anniversary edition of the album was released in November 2024.

== Background ==
A Love Letter to You 4 was announced by Redd in an Instagram on from August 31, 2019. It serves as the fourth installment in the A Love Letter to You mixtape series. The project came into existence after Trippie Redd's break-up with Coi Leray, and was released on November 22, 2019.

On November 25, 2019, Trippie teased the deluxe edition of the mixtape, stating that it would include the previously released track "TR666" (with Swae Lee) and the previously teased track "Hell Rain" (featuring Lil Wayne and HoodyBaby), and two more new songs. However, neither of these tracks appeared on the officially released version; rather, they both appeared on Pegasus (2020). The deluxe edition of A Love Letter to You 4 was released on February 21, 2020 and includes 8 bonus tracks. Erika Marie of HotNewHipHop noted that the "songs were added to the beginning of the album so listeners can ease into the new music right away." The 5-year anniversary edition was released on November 22, 2024 with the tracklist rearranged.

== Songs ==
=== Overview ===
Of the project's organisation, Redd stated in an interview with Lyrical Lemonade: "I studied the way I put all of my projects together and that's how I came up with the concept for this album. To make it be one section about love, one section is alternative rock, one section is rap." Interviewed by Music Connection, Redd said that "basically the concept behind this mixtape is all aspects of love. The grunginess and the heart and the music together make it a work of art. It makes it sound like an album." Redd also used memes in some of the songs on the project, and makes frequent reference to popular culture, and elements of his childhood (including the Grinch and The Jungle Book).

=== Standard edition ===
==== Tracks 1–7 ====
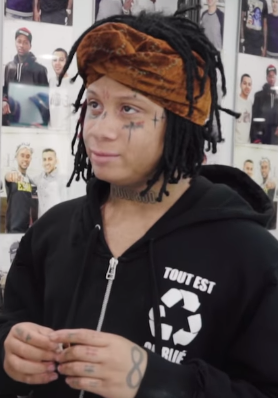
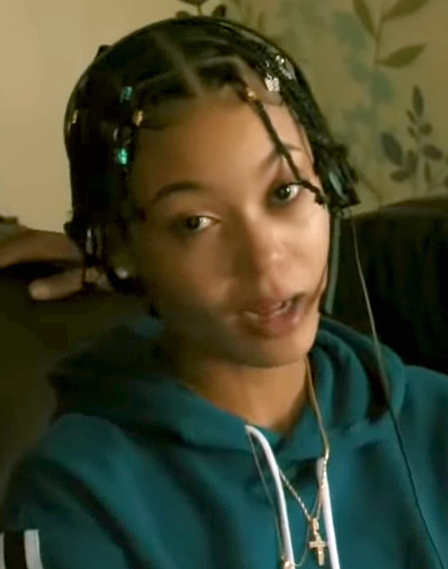
Much of the album, particularly the song "Leray", concerns the relationship between Trippie Redd (left) and Coi Leray (right)

The opening track, "Leray", begins with a spoken-word message to his ex-girlfriend Coi Leray over an acoustic guitar instrumental. AllMusic described the song as "the scathing takedown of an ex"; similarly, Afterglow called it "practically a diss track to his ex-girlfriend". The second track (and third single), "Who Needs Love", was previewed by Trippie Redd in an Instagram post on September 1, 2019, one day after the album's announcement. Thematically, the song concerns Redd's desire to refrain from chasing love after his past relationships. In the third song, "Love Sick", Redd asks his significant other to forget that he ever professed his love for her. Music Feeds described "Love Sick" as "throwback '90s R&B – K-Ci & JoJo for the Bryson Tiller gen." The album's fourth song and lead single, "Love Me More", details a relationship that Redd is unsatisfied with. Its refrain conveys his wish that his partner would love and appreciate him more. The song was originally due to appear on Internet Money's B4 the Storm, but Taz Taylor gave the song back to Redd for A Love Letter to You 4. Niles West News described the sequence of tracks 2-4 as "showing denial, bargaining, and redirected hope."

On the fifth song, "Real Feel", Redd says that outsiders' opinions don't matter, and that his love remains unchanged. The next song, "This Ain't That", introduces the first feature of the mixtape in Lil Mosey. The song is also the first collaboration between Redd and Lil Mosey; they later collaborated on "Never Scared" from the latter's second studio album Certified Hitmaker (2019). Lyrically, the two rappers discuss their street credentials. AllMusic praised the song for its catchiness, whilst Music Feeds opined that "[t]he track emits the same energy as vintage G-funk, its mellow yacht rock atmospherics belying darker themes." Variety commended the "excellent Chopsquad DJ beat" and the "guest feature from Lil Mosey, whose ethereal verse stalks across the soundscape like a flamingo." The eighth song, "6 Kiss", is a collaboration between Redd, Juice Wrld and YNW Melly. The song features a slow-paced beat, and three verses from Juice Wrld, YNW Melly and Trippie Redd respectively. Towards the beginning of the track, a sample of an anime shine sound effect, used in various cartoons such as Naruto, is used. Lyrically, the artists discuss murder and savagery while making references to elements of popular culture including Twitter, Harry Potter, Coraline and Megamind. The song marks the first collaboration between Trippie Redd and YNW Melly. HotNewHipHop praised the song, writing, "This is one of the better songs from Redd's new album and, to be completely honest, it might be one of the smoothest cuts he's ever released." Likewise, Niles West News stated: "[a]lthough the song is very explicit, the beat behind the song connects with the voices of all three artists very well, bringing out the harmonies in each verse."

==== Tracks 8–15 ====
The eighth track, "Til the End of Time", continues the theme of love. It opens with a voice message from Molly McLachlan, the head of artist relations at Trippie Redd's label 10K Projects. On the next song, "U Deserve It" – a collaboration between Redd, Quan'ta and Chris King – the artists focus on an unspecified girl that they feel indebted to. Redd had previewed a snippet of the track on his Instagram account on October 9, 2019, along with a caption that read "💞ALLTY4". The tenth song, "Hate Me", Redd and YoungBoy Never Broke Again go back and forth and discuss fake love. The song was leaked in late September 2019 under the title "Blinded". Towards the beginning of the track, there is a sample from the animated sitcom The Simpsons which serves as StolenCable's producer tag.HipHopDX identified "Hate Me", together with "Who Needs Love", as songs exemplary of "Trippie's mastery of the emo-inspired tones, remnants from the SoundCloud era of his career." On the eleventh track, "All for Me", Redd and Smokepurpp rap about love and loyalty. The song features vocals from XXXTentacion's "Heart and Yours" vlog published in January 2018 on his YouTube channel before being deleted. Three weeks after the song's initial release, it was re-released as a part of Smokepurpp's album, Deadstar 2, missing the original XXXTentacion voice recording. The next song, "Sickening", is the third collaboration between Trippie Redd and Tory Lanez, following "Ferris Wheel" (Love Me Now?; October 2018) and "Diamond Minds" (A Love Letter to You 3; November 2018). Lyrically, the two rappers speak on themes of disease and violence.

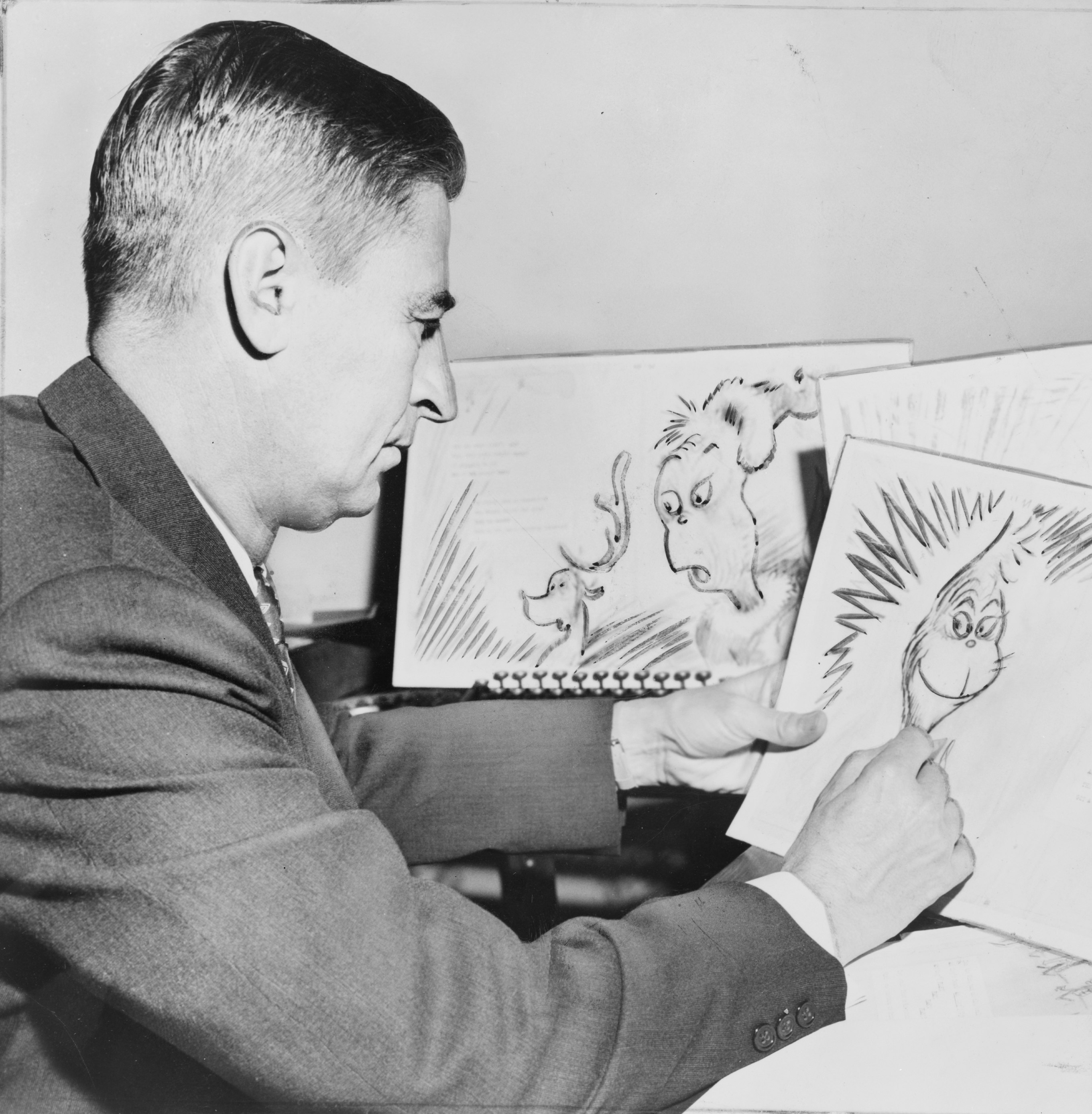
Redd named the thirteenth song on A Love Letter to You 4 after the Grinch, whose creator Dr. Seuss can here be seen working on How the Grinch Stole Christmas! in early 1957

"The Grinch", the thirteenth song on the mixtape, sees Redd continually switch up his delivery over a bass-heavy Pi'erre Bourne instrumental. The beat was originally used by Kevin Gates on his August 2019 track "Double Dutch (In Amsterdam Witt It)". Redd previewed a snippet of the song on November 3, 2019, describing the record as "RAGE MUSIC". The song is named after Dr. Seuss's character the Grinch, the titular main protagonist of the 1957 children's book How the Grinch Stole Christmas! Music Feeds wrote: "Trippie rages on the industrial 'The Grinch', a Pi'erre Bourne instrumental." The next song, "Death", is a collaboration with DaBaby and serves as the mixtape's second single. The song samples "Hit a Muthafucka" (Chapter 2: World Domination) by Three 6 Mafia and is produced by DJ Paul and TWhy Xclusive; the former of whom is a member of Three 6 Mafia. On his collaboration with producer DJ Paul, Redd said: "I feel like I utilize a lot of older producers' beats because they are nostalgic. I love nostalgia. ... I was always observant of the older guys cause that's what I grew up to. I would always see they did this and that and they made this many hits and all that, so I was like shit that's somebody I wanna work with. So when I did, I got a platinum record." The mixtape's fifteenth song, "RMP", is an initialism for 'Richard Mille Plain'. In the song Redd primarily discusses this luxury watch.

==== Tracks 16–21 ====
The sixteenth song, "M's", sees Trippie Redd, Lil Yachty, and Pi'erre Bourne boast of their extravagant lifestyles. This song marks the first collaboration between Redd and Pi'erre as a vocalist, and the fifth official collaboration between Redd and Lil Yachty. The song came after "66" (Lil Boat 2; March 2018), "Who Run It (Remix)" (April 2018), "Mood Swings" (Birthday Mix 3; August 2018) and "Forever World" (Nuthin' 2 Prove; October 2018). The song attracted much comment from reviewers. Ryan Feyre of RapReviews commended the song, writing: "Pi'erre Bourne's whirlwind of hi-hats and xylophone is perfect for a frolic in the park with Lil Yachty and Trippie. These two can't make a non-enjoyable song together. ... I can't think of a better musical duo under the age of 21; seriously." Feyre also praised Redd's outlandish lyricism on the song. By contrast, Kieran Press-Reynolds of Variety had a more mixed reaction towards the song, saying that it "sounds like the loopy lovechild of Dram's "Broccoli" and 21 Savage's "Bank Account"." He added: "[t]he lyrics reflect the beat's cartoonishly absurd texture: "She bounce on that d–k / so I call that b—h Tigger," Trippie chirrups cheerfully, referencing the very unsexy pogoing tiger from Winnie-the-Pooh." The next song, "Bust Down Deux", is the sequel to Bust Down (A Love Letter to You 2, 2017). In the song, Redd raps the first verse and hooks whilst French rapper Youv Dee gives the second. In a July 2019 interview, Redd explained: "I did a song with [Youv Dee], and it was so fire that I kept it for myself. And I'm about to do another song for his tape." Redd later previewed a snippet of the song on Instagram Live.

In the seventeenth song, "The Jungle Book", Trippie Redd lets associate Lil Wop rap the first verse over a Murda Beatz instrumental. The song samples Kenji Kawai's "Making of Cyborg", the main theme from the anime Ghost in the Shell. In an Instagram post, Redd explained the reason for the song's name: "the jungle book was my fav movie as a kid I made this song on my birthday and named it jungle book cause the beat was so jungle ish lol❤️ [sic]". The eighteenth song, "Chosen", sees Redd make reference to Little Caesars, Wiz Khalifa and DeMar DeRozan over a Wheezy-produced beat. In the next song, "Abandoned", Redd and Mariah the Scientist duet about lost love. The song marks the artists' first collaboration together. Ryan Feyre of RapReviews wrote: "The album finishes off strong with a tender acoustic number featuring a stunning performance by Mariah the Scientist ("Abandoned"). Nothing like good ole' tender Trippie Redd, am I right?" Discussing the twenty-first song, which is the final track of the standard edition, Feyre continued: "I personally prefer boom-bap Trippie on "Can You Rap Like Me, Pt. 2", an ode to fans who've been with him since the beginning." In this song, Redd sings the first verse and his associate Chris King delivers the second. The song is a sequel to "Can You Rap Like Me" from the first installment of the A Love Letter to You mixtape series, which is similarly produced. "Can You Rap Like Me, Pt. 2" is produced by P. Soul and Scott Theft, the former of whom also produced the Chris King–Trippie Redd collaboration "A Kouple More Bars" (Ble$$ You; 2020).

=== Deluxe edition ===
==== Tracks 1–4 ====
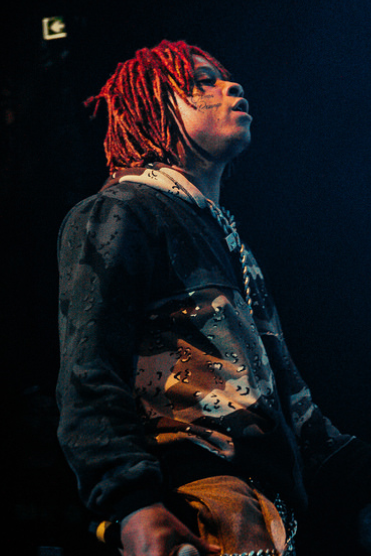
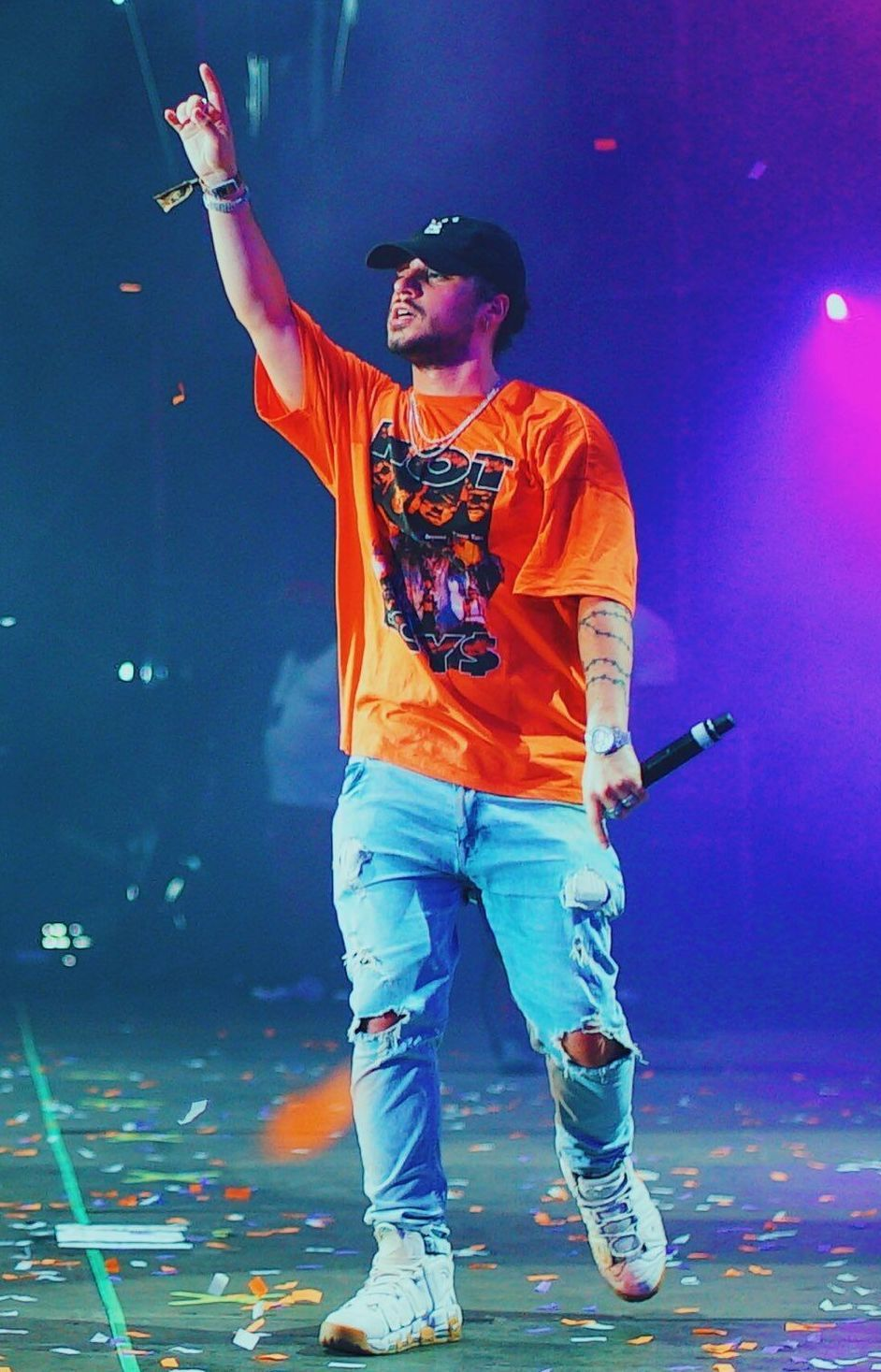
The deluxe's second song (and second single) is a collaboration between Trippie Redd (left) and Russ (right), both pictured in 2018

The first song of the deluxe edition is "I Love You" (featuring Chance the Rapper). The song marks the first time Trippie Redd and Chance the Rapper have worked together, and sees the two rappers allude to their significant others and speak to the strength of their relationships. The deluxe edition's second song (and second single), "The Way", sees Redd and featured artist Russ sing about how they both find ways to make their relationships work. This song also samples a viral YouTube video from 2009 of a young boy confessing his love to a girl on the playground of his school, which Redd plays on in the bridge of the song. In an interview with Lyrical Lemonade, Redd revealed that he had met Russ in the studio with Scott Storch. He said: "I had this record ["The Way"] and he commented on it cause I posted it on Instagram and he was like "we gotta make some shit like this", and I was like "make some shit like this? You might as well hop on this one". So I sent it to him and that ended up being "The Way"."

The deluxe's third song and lead single, "Yell Oh", is a collaboration between Trippie Redd and Young Thug in which the two rappers talk about their respective nights with girls. The conclusion of the song features a sample sourced from a Halloween witch decoration, sold by the company Grandin Road. When activated by a motion detector, the decoration plays one of three sound files – one of which was used by Redd in the song. This file emits the message: "Another foolish child dares to trespass on this wicked place? Here, now a spell to remove that smile from your pretty face! Hoggles and haggerdash, and eyes of a crow – all powers are mine now, and all that you know." The track marks the second collaboration between Redd and Young Thug, following "Forever Ever" (Life's a Trip; 2018). The song was initially previewed on Redd's Instagram in a now-deleted post on November 15, 2019, a week before the release of A Love Letter To You 4's standard edition. This song was originally planned to be released as a non-album single alongside a video directed by Gxdlike. However, a new plan was adopted once Young Thug added to the song: Redd decided to release the song as a single for the mixtape's deluxe edition. The fourth song, "How I Was Raised" (featuring Lil Tecca), was cut from the mixtape's standard edition, despite initially being confirmed by Redd as being part of the tracklist. An alternate version of the track featuring 9lokkNine in addition to Lil Tecca leaked on January 3, 2020. However, the track finally released on the deluxe of A Love Letter to You 4 without 9lokkNine's verse. The song is the first collaboration between Redd and Tecca.

==== Tracks 5–8 ====
On the deluxe edition's fifth song, "OTF Knightmare", Trippie Redd recruits Chicago-based rappers Lil Durk and G Herbo for a fast-paced exchange over an aggressive Pi'erre Bourne beat. Bourne also produced the next track, "Even Steven", which sees Redd rap about sex and violence. The song opens with a sample from the internet meme 'Kazoo Kid'. The deluxe edition's seventh track, "Amazinggg", marks Redd's first collaboration with SahBabii. In an interview with Pigeons & Planes, SahBabii explained that it was director Aidan Cullen – who at the time was working with SahBabii filming the video to "Double Dick" (Barnacles; 2020) and who had extensively worked with Redd for the visuals to A Love Letter to You 4 – who suggested the two should collaborate. The song is also the last of the mixtape's seven Pi'erre Bourne-produced tracks. A since-deleted snippet of the song was teased in early 2020. Following the song's release in February 2020, SahBabii and Redd went live on Instagram, during which the former played several unreleased collaborations with Redd and claimed that the duo was working on a collaboration project. As of 2025, this is yet to materialise.

The eighth and final track, "Koi", is also addressed to Coi Leray. As Redd placed the songs on the deluxe before the standard edition songs, the total tracklisting therefore reads "Koi" and then "Leray". After the song's release, Leray responded to Redd on Twitter, writing: "let this be the last fucking project with my name on it ... that's all ima say [sic] ... time will heal ...". She soon added: "I wish you would have [sic] just made everything right instead of doing shit this way... smh shit crazy [sic] .... I'm gone ... bout to blast pop smoke till I fall asleep 🤘🏼🥂". Finally, she wrote: "Instead of just saying I want you back , [sic] you gonna keep putting me on your albums? Childish".

=== Other ===
The track "Bad Vibes Forever" (by XXXTentacion featuring Trippie Redd and PnB Rock) from the album of the same name was originally included amongst a second version of the mixtape that Trippie Redd had uploaded. However, as the track appeared on Bad Vibes Forever two weeks later, Redd removed it from the mixtape.

== Packaging and promotion ==
The first single from A Love Letter to You 4, "Love Me More", was released on November 1, 2019. The second and third singles, "Death" (featuring DaBaby) and "Who Needs Love", were released on November 12, 2019, and November 19, 2019, respectively. On November 26, 2019, Redd added his collaboration with XXXTentacion, "Bad Vibes Forever" to A Love Letter to You 4; the single was first released on the same day as the mixtape. The tape was redistributed on streaming services to include this song, which some initially interpreted as the deluxe version of the tape, but this was not the case. Redd ultimately removed "Bad Vibes Forever" from the project within a week of adding it. On February 7, 2020, Redd released "Yell Oh" (featuring Young Thug), the first single from the deluxe edition. On February 19, 2020, Redd released the second single, "The Way" (featuring Russ), and unveiled the deluxe tracklist.

HotNewHipHop described the album's cover as "a close-up of the rapper's face with a burst of colors, gems on his face, and awe-inspiring effects." Kyle Atkinson of K-UTE listed the cover amongst his list of the best five pieces of hip hop artwork in 2019. The deluxe cover was initially a recasting of the standard cover in a purple shade, however Redd later removed the alternate cover.

On November 22, 2024, Redd released the 5-year anniversary edition of the album, alongside a grey recasting of the cover.

=== Tour ===
Trippie Redd's 'Love Me More Tour' began in Seattle on January 22, 2020. The tour saw Redd headline 38 shows in the United States. He also performed in Europe from March 29, 2020 for 8 shows.

== Critical reception ==
Professional ratings
Review scores
Source	Rating
AllMusic	3/5 stars
HipHopDX	3/5
The Declaration	8.5/10
HotNewHipHop	'HOTTTTT' (Note: HotNewHipHop rated both the mixtape and its deluxe edition as 'HOTTTTT'.)
Niles West News	9/10
RapReviews	6/10
Music Feeds	(very favorable)
Afterglow	(very favorable)
Variety	(favorable)

A Love Letter to You 4 received highly positive reviews from music critics. Cyclone Wehner of Music Feeds stated that though "Trippie isn't yet a hip-hop superstar to rival Travis Scott, Young Thug or Lil Uzi Vert", "[h]appily, his latest mixtape, A Love Letter To You 4... could change that." Wehner added that the project "is a defining work", and commended its relatable lyricism. Thomas Galindo of Afterglow wrote that "the soulful, trademark emo rap songs do a great job [of] flowing with one another, and include many impassioned bops that are easy to sing along to." Galindo added that Redd hadn't released such "an impressive, cohesive project since Life's a Trip" (2018). Aila Durakovic of Niles West News opined that "the musical excellence of Redd is displayed perfectly in this album". Durakovic also praised Redd's use of features. Dawayne De Rios of The Declaration summarised that "A Love Letter to You 4 seems to be everything fans could ask for from the artist. Reviewing the mixtape's deluxe edition highly favorably, Daniel Newman of RhymeJunkie wrote: "The deluxe edition of his mixtape did not disappoint sonically; Trippie Redd still brings his rock star style and rhythms to the beat, never switching up from the tone that he originally rooted in his music." Redd himself said in April 2020 that he considered A Love Letter to You 4 and Life's a Trip his best projects.

However, many critics also criticised the project's lack of consistency. David Aaron Brake of HipHopDX wrote: "However chaotic a break-up might feel, [A Love Letter to You 4] lacks the cohesion necessary to thoughtfully express some of [the] complexities of love and relationships," adding that the mixtape "lacks a guiding theme" and that Trippie Redd comes across as "stale and guarded". Fred Thomas of AllMusic added that "Enthusiasts of Trippie Redd's brand of quasi-visceral heartbroken emo rap will have plenty to enjoy, but discerning listeners might have to pick a few favorite songs and discard the rest." Himself responding to criticism of the project's length, Redd stated: "I'll put it this way—if you gonna keep the same flow on every damn song, I don't wanna hear 30 songs from you bro. But, if you got a n***a that's doing a rock song here and there, some R&B songs, some rap songs, some catchy wavy type shit, using different melodies, then I don't care how long it is. I love sitting through albums. I do it all for the fans. A lot of people just be critics. I let the critics be critics, but the fans, they don't care how much I drop."

Ryan Feyre, writing for RapReviews, concluded, "Despite its unevenness, A Love Letter to You 4 has something for everyone. And for those who've been there since the beginning, you should expect nothing less from [Trippie Redd]". Similarly, Wehner of Music Feeds judged that "ALLTY4 might be more adventurously curated, and more consciously conceptualised. But, perhaps for Trippie, such an approach would undermine the project's authenticity. Indeed, ALLTY4 may be for Trippie what 2016's Jeffery was to Young Thug – a mixtape that presents a statement of direction as a mood."

== Commercial performance ==
A Love Letter to You 4 debuted atop the US Billboard 200 chart, earning 104,000 album-equivalent units (including 14,000 copies as pure album sales) in its first week. Trippie Redd outsold Jason Aldean (9), who took the number two spot with 83,000 equivalent album units. The project was Redd's first US number-one album and his fourth top ten album, following !, which debuted at number three in August 2019. The mixtape also charted in the top 30 in 9 other territories. Additionally, the mixtape accumulated a total of 125.9 million on demand streams from the set's songs that week. In its second week, the mixtape dropped to number three on the chart, earning an additional 54,000 units. In response to his accomplishment, Redd published two Instagram posts captioned "#1" and "love you guys" respectively.

From the record project, "Who Needs Love" (58), "Death" (59), "6 Kiss" (60), "Love Me More" (79), "Hate Me" (84) and "Bad Vibes Forever" (85) all charted within the Billboard Hot 100. "Love Sick" (9) and "Leray" (25) both charted within the Bubbling Under Hot 100. On November 9, 2022, "Love Sick" and "Leray" achieved Gold certification from the Recording Industry Association of America (RIAA). On October 8, 2020, "Death" achieved Platinum certification from the Recording Industry Association of America (RIAA). On July 21, 2021, "Who Needs Love", "Love Me More" and "6 Kiss" also achieved Platinum certification. "Hate Me" and "The Grinch" achieved Platinum certification on November 9, 2022. On October 8, 2020, A Love Letter to You 4 was certified Gold by the Recording Industry Association of America (RIAA). On July 21, 2021, the mixtape's certification was upgraded to Platinum.

== Track listing ==
A Love Letter to You 4 – Standard edition
No.	Title	Writer(s)	Producer(s)	Length
1.	"Leray"	Michael White IV; Xeryus Gittens; Igor Mamet	Xeryus; Mamet	2:02
2.	"Who Needs Love"	White; Mamet; Jose Velazquez	Angel Lopez	2:38
3.	"Love Sick"	White; Adrian Rupke; Francisco Baptista	Hammad Beats; FrankieOnTheGuitar	2:57
4.	"Love Me More"	White; Nicholas Mira; Danny Snodgrass Jr.	Nick Mira; Taz Taylor	2:23
5.	"Real Feel"	White; Velazquez; Mamet; Todd Pritchard	Angel Lopez; Mamet; Todd Pritch	4:18
6.	"This Ain't That" (featuring Lil Mosey)	White; Lathan Echols; Darrell Jackson	Chopsquad DJ	3:27
7.	"6 Kiss" (featuring Juice Wrld and YNW Melly)	White; Jarad Higgins; Jamell Demons; Mira; Snodgrass Jr.	Nick Mira; Taz Taylor	3:19
8.	"Til the End of Time"	White; Kim Candilora; Jared Scharff	KC Supreme; Pearl Lion	2:54
9.	"U Deserve It" (featuring Chris King and Quan'ta)	White; Christopher Cheeks Jr.; Quan'ta Evans; Anton Mendo; Joseph Boyden	Starboy; SephGotTheWaves	4:04
10.	"Hate Me" (featuring YoungBoy Never Broke Again)	White; Kentrell Gaulden; Wyatt Jackson; Cooper Reed; Eustacio Bermudez; Steve Pepoon; Mamet	StolenCable; Icy Chill Out; Cheeto; Mamet	2:24
11.	"All For Me" (featuring Smokepurpp)	White; Omar Pineiro; Michael Mora; Leonardo Mateus	Bans; Stunner Samples	2:44
12.	"Sickening" (featuring Tory Lanez)	White; Daystar Peterson; Jackson; Mario Petersen; Jonas Kaissouni	Chopsquad DJ; Petersen; Kzuni	3:13
13.	"The Grinch"	White; Jordan Jenks	Pi'erre Bourne	1:31
14.	"Death" (featuring DaBaby)	White; Jonathan Kirk; Paul Beauregard; Tim Moore; Reginald Boyland	DJ Paul; TWhy Xclusive	2:52
15.	"RMP"	White; Jenks	Pi'erre Bourne	2:09
16.	"M's" (featuring Lil Yachty and Pi'erre Bourne)	White; Miles McCollum; Jenks	Pi'erre Bourne	1:53
17.	"Bust Down Deux" (featuring Youv Dee)	White; Jamal Thioune; Henrique Ibanda	Skuna	2:15
18.	"The Jungle Book" (featuring Lil Wop)	White; Louis McPherson; Shane Lindstrom	Murda Beatz	2:39
19.	"Chosen"	White; Wesley Glass	Wheezy	3:04
20.	"Abandoned" (featuring Mariah the Scientist)	White; Mariah Buckles; Mira; Snodgrass Jr.	Nick Mira; Taz Taylor	4:00
21.	"Can You Rap Like Me, Pt. 2" (featuring Chris King)	White; Cheeks; Brandon Beazer; Kenneth Gamble; Leon Huff	P. Soul; Scott Theft	2:12
Total length:				59:08

A Love Letter to You 4 (Deluxe)
No.	Title	Writer(s)	Producer(s)	Length
1.	"I Love You" (featuring Chance the Rapper)	White; Chancelor Bennett; Mira; Christian Osei-Poku	Nick Mira; Shadxw	3:49
2.	"The Way" (featuring Russ)	White; Russell Vitale; Scharff; Mamet; Velazquez	Pearl Lion; Mamet; Angel Lopez	4:03
3.	"Yell Oh" (featuring Young Thug)	White; Jeffery Williams; Jenks	Pi'erre Bourne	3:58
4.	"How I Was Raised" (featuring Lil Tecca)	White; Tyler-Justin Sharpe; Mira; Snodgrass Jr.; William Repko II	Nick Mira; Taz Taylor; Repko	2:49
5.	"Otf Knightmare" (featuring Lil Durk and G Herbo)	White; Durk Banks; Herbert Wright III; Jenks	Pi'erre Bourne	2:36
6.	"Even Steven"	White; Jenks	Pi'erre Bourne	2:05
7.	"Amazinggg" (featuring SahBabii)	White; Saheem Valdery; Jenks	Pi'erre Bourne	2:02
8.	"Koi"	White; Austin Leech; Conner Leech	WE ARE THE STARS	2:29
Total length:				83:04

Notes

- The track "Bad Vibes Forever" from the album of the same name, was originally included amongst a second version of the mixtape that Trippie Redd had uploaded but later removed, due to it appearing on Bad Vibes Forever two weeks later.
- The track "All For Me" also appears on the album Deadstar 2, without the voice memo ending by XXXTentacion.
- "RMP" is an initialism for 'Richard Mille Plain'.
- "Yell Oh" and "Otf Knightmare" are both stylized in capitals.
- "How I Was Raised" also originally featured American rapper 9lokkNine, but did not appear on the final release.

== Charts ==
=== Weekly charts ===
Weekly chart performance for A Love Letter to You 4
Chart (2019)	Peak position
Australian Albums (ARIA)	47
Belgian Albums (Ultratop Flanders)	59
Belgian Albums (Ultratop Wallonia)	68
Canadian Albums (Billboard)	6
Danish Albums (Hitlisten)	27
Dutch Albums (Album Top 100)	22
Estonian Albums (IFPI)	10
Finnish Albums (Suomen virallinen lista)	36
French Albums (SNEP)	56
Irish Albums (IRMA)	26
Latvian Albums (LAIPA)	13
Lithuanian Albums (AGATA)	26
New Zealand Albums (RMNZ)	17
Norwegian Albums (VG-lista)	12
Swiss Albums (Schweizer Hitparade)	43
UK Albums (Official Charts)	32
US Billboard 200	1
US Top R&B/Hip-Hop Albums (Billboard)	1

=== Year-end charts ===
Year-end chart performance for A Love Letter to You 4
Chart (2020)	Position
US Billboard 200	31
US Top R&B/Hip-Hop Albums (Billboard)	29

== Certifications ==
Certifications for A Love Letter to You 4
Region	Certification	Certified units/sales
Canada (Music Canada)	Platinum	80,000^{‡}
United Kingdom (BPI)	Silver	60,000^{‡}
United States (RIAA)	Platinum	1,000,000^{‡}
^{‡} Sales+streaming figures based on certification alone.
