= A Love Letter to You 3 =

Mixtape by Trippie Redd
- Released: November 9, 2018
- Recorded: 2017–2018
- Genre: Emo rap
- Length: 43:39
- Labels: 10K Projects; Caroline
- Producers: 808-H; ChopSquad DJ; Dez Wright; Diplo; Elliott Trent; Foreign Teck; Goose the Guru; Honorable C.N.O.T.E.; Icon South; Jacob Reske; King Henry; krischordz; Nellz; OZ; Pas Beatz; Rex Kudo; Staccato; Tariq Beats; Tony Trouble; WE ARE THE STARS; Nick Barbs

Trippie Redd chronology
| Life's a Trip (2018) | A Love Letter to You 3 (2018) | ! (2019) |

A Love Letter to You mixtapes chronology
| A Love Letter to You 2 (2017) | A Love Letter to You 3 (2018) | A Love Letter to You 4 (2019) |

Singles from A Love Letter to You 3
- 1. "Topanga" Released: October 22, 2018

A Love Letter to You 3 (often abbreviated as ALLTY3) is the third commercial mixtape by American rapper Trippie Redd. It is also the third installment in the A Love Letter to You mixtape series. It was released on November 9, 2018, by Caroline Distribution. The project features guest appearances from Emani22, Kodie Shane, Baby Goth, YoungBoy Never Broke Again, Nel-Denarro, Juice Wrld, Tory Lanez and Elliott Trent. Production was primarily handled by OZ, who produced half of the sixteen tracks. The mixtape also features production from Chopsquad DJ, Honorable C.N.O.T.E., and Diplo, among others.

A Love Letter to You 3 sees Trippie Redd blend cloud rap and emo rap to explore emotional vulnerability, heartbreak, and self-destruction. One critic wrote: "ALLTY3 finds the rising star contemplating newer and deeper emotions, reflecting on his positionality at the vanguard of the new school... and exploring new musical genres and styles". The mixtape was supported by its lead and sole single, "Topanga", for which a music video was released on October 30, 2018. Despite minimal promotion, the record project was a commercial success, debuting at number three on the US Billboard 200 chart with 84,000 first-week album-equivalent units. It was also widely acclaimed by critics. On October 8, 2020, A Love Letter to You 3 was certified Gold by the Recording Industry Association of America (RIAA). On November 9, 2022, the mixtape's certification was upgraded to Platinum.

== Background and recording ==
Trippie Redd stated on his social media that he recorded the album in two weeks "right after Life's a Trip", and called it "lowkey better". Speaking about the mixtape to Zane Lowe on Beats 1, Trippie Redd said: "The way I set up my projects, I put the first track to the last track. If you listen to it from start to finish, that's how I put it together. It's art, it's not anything to play with." On the content of A Love Letter to You 3, Trippie Redd told Lowe: "It has some stuff about relationships, but that's life. 'Toxic Waste' is about a toxic relationship. What you hear is mixed — everybody has to mix their vocals for how it's supposed to sound. When I record, I do use autotune, but I don't use it how people use it. I like samples a lot."

== Songs ==
=== Tracks 1–8 ===
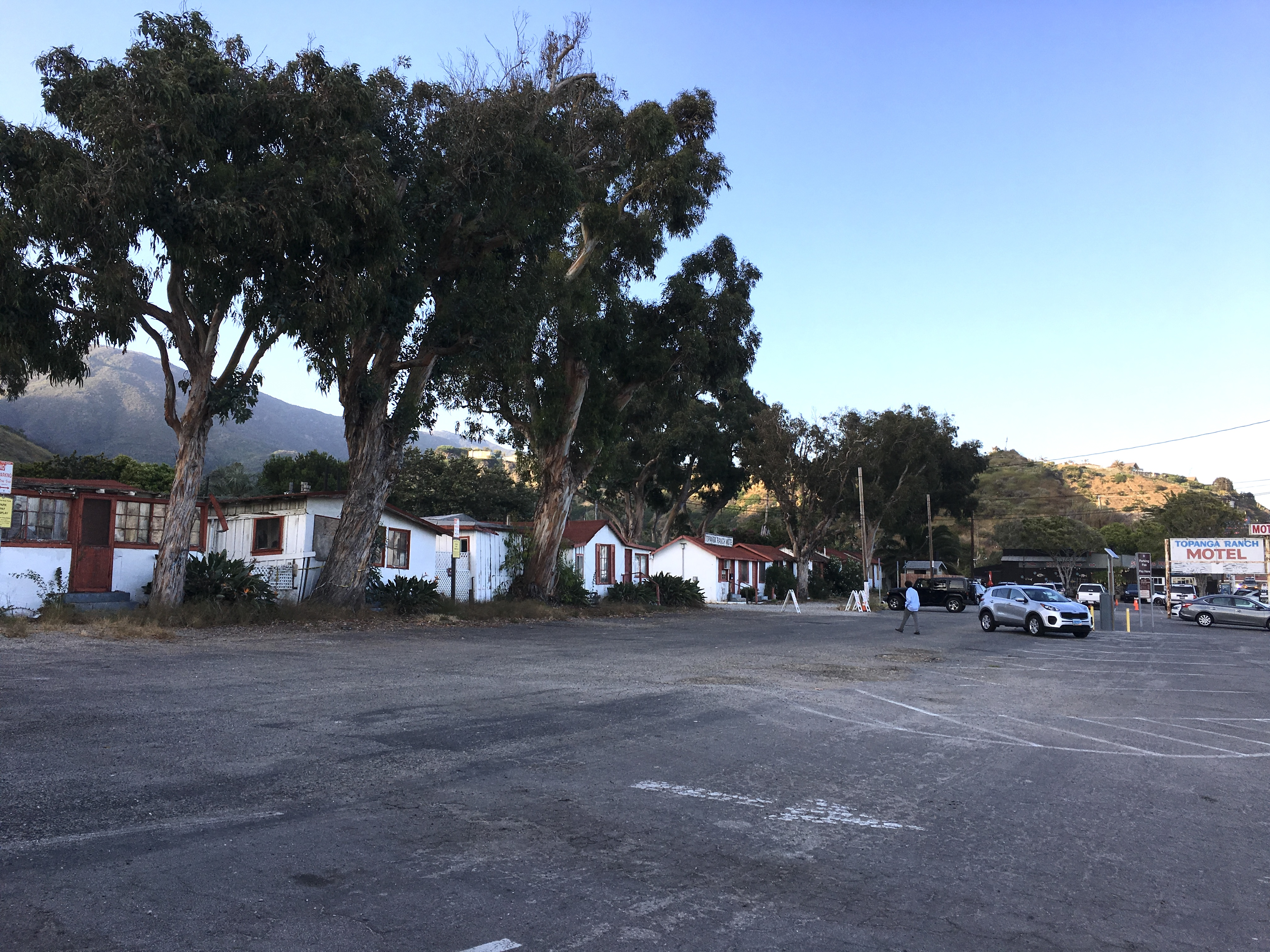
The first song, "Topanga", is named after the unincorporated community of Topanga

The opening track, "Topanga", serves as A Love Letter to You 3's lead and only single. Produced by Chopsquad DJ, it features a pitched-up sample of Maurette Brown Clark's 2006 gospel song, "It Ain't Over". Vince Rick of HotNewHipHop opined that the song's "upbeat, stagey production is reminiscent of the Diplo-produced track, "Wish"". In the song, Redd discusses gun possession and usage, along with references to religion and the unincorporated community of Topanga in western Los Angeles County, California. Analysing the song's lyrical themes, Rick continued: ""Topanga" is truer to Trippie Redd's earlier style. Violence is a fundamental component to the romantic theses of his Love Letter series, so it's only appropriate that he begin the album with some harsh words for the many imagined and real enemies that surround him." A music video was released on October 30 2018. Trey Alston of Pitchfork described the visual thus: "Redd is dressed as an irreverent pastor, singing about his ability to save his damsel and tote guns. He's not the kind of vicar to pass around the collection plate; there are pentagrams and animal skulls dispersed throughout. He levitates menacingly, his hair's an angry shade of crimson, there's a green serpent here as well. Neat!" In the video, Redd can be seen floating inside of a circle of women, referencing the Manson Family cult which inhabited Topanga. Interviewed by Music Connection, Redd said that "There’s a Charles Manson reference, which was what I was trying to do with the video. That’s why the video is so dark, because it’s on some Charles Manson shit." The second song, "Fire Starter", was produced by Honorable C.N.O.T.E. and Tony Trouble. The outro is performed by featured artist Emani22. The next track, "Toxic Waste", explores toxic relationships in which Redd yearns for love, which he likens to a drug. Redd himself stated: ""Toxic Waste" is about a toxic relationship – and that's all I can really say about that. A lot of people be looking [sic] for trouble. I think even sometimes I be looking [sic] for trouble on purpose." The track is produced by Diplo and King Henry, the former of whom also produced "Wish" (Life's a Trip, 2018). Zach Colten of The Gatepost called the track "touchingly introspective".

The fourth song, "Negative Energy" (featuring Kodie Shane), sees the two artists express their desire to dissociate from individuals with the eponymous negative energy. On September 21, 2018, Redd posted a snippet of the song on his Instagram. The next song, "Can't Love", is the first on the mixtape to be produced by OZ. It samples "Buenos Genes" by Rels B and Dellafuente (2018), and its content matter revolves around the pain Trippie Redd feels from his break-up with his ex-girlfriend Ayleks. The mixtape's sixth song, "Love Scars 3", acts as a sequel to the tracks "Love Scars" and "Love Scars, Pt. 2 / Rack City" (A Love Letter to You, 2017). On August 11, 2018, Redd posted a picture of himself on Instagram with the caption "LOVE SCARS 3/DONT LEAVE👺". The following day, he released a snippet of the song. The song was initially expected to be a part of a deluxe edition of Life's a Trip (2018) but was released as part of A Love Letter to You 3. On the song's lyrical content, critic Chris Mench noted that Redd presented a more open-minded perspective on love in contrast to his attitude on "Love Scars" and "Love Scars, Pt. 2 / Rack City". The title track, "A.L.L.T.Y. 3" (featuring Baby Goth), sees Trippie boast about his wealth and tough talking. The line "VVS, them diamonds ice, yeah my neck bling / Nigga, your neck green" refers to the phenomenon whereby, upon perspiration, the metals in cheap jewellery react with the acid in sweat to form green-coloured salts. These acids cause the nickel to corrode on the surface of the metal, forming a salt compound of the metal. These salts are absorbed into the skin, giving it a green pigment. The eighth song, "Emani Interlude", is performed by Redd's then-girlfriend, Emani22, with an outro by Redd. This outro sees him express his hate for an ex-girlfriend of his.

=== Tracks 9–16 ===
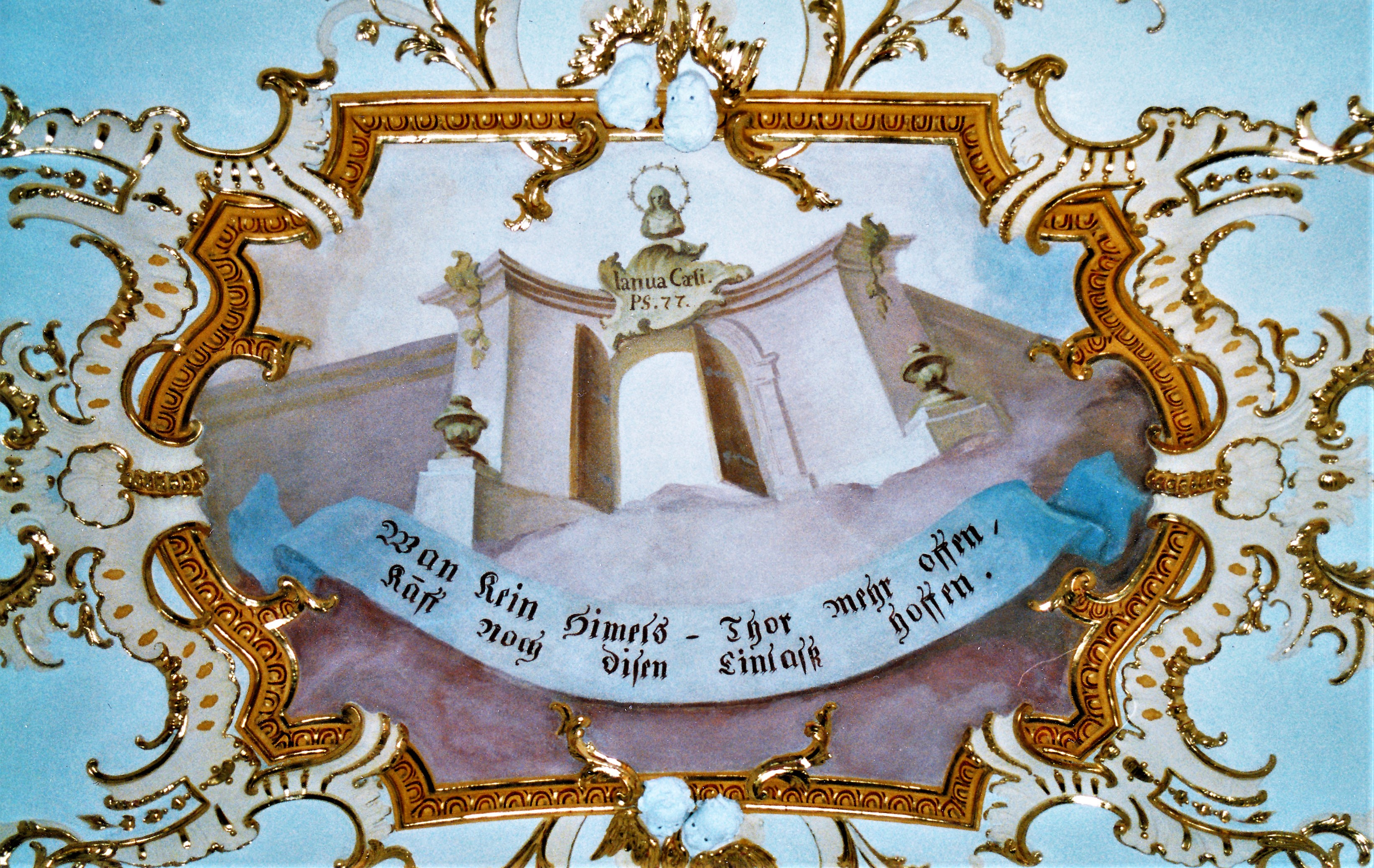
This painting by Johann Baptist Zimmermann (1680-1758), named Ianua coeli, depicts 'Heaven's Gate', to which Trippie Redd alludes in "Loyalty Before Royalty"

"Elevate & Motivate", the ninth song on A Love Letter to You 3, features NBA YoungBoy and Nel-Denarro. The song is the second collaboration between YoungBoy and Trippie Redd after "Murda" (Decided, 2018). The next track, "I Tried Loving", concerns the aftermath of a relationship Trippie Redd has been involved in and the self-medication he has engaged in. Redd himself stated: "It's about depression and shit. I almost ended up changing up the title to "I Tried Loving Myself" cause [sic] that's what it was supposed to be called, low-key." On the song's chorus, Redd incorporates a cadence from Rascal Flatts' "Life Is a Highway". Redd originally posted a snippet of this song on his Instagram on October 19, 2018. The eleventh song, "Wicked", uses a minor sample of "Closure" (featuring Szjerdene) by Lapalux (Lustmore, 2015). Lyrically, the song blends cosmic imagery with personal reflection. "Loyalty Before Royalty" is the twelfth song on the mixtape. In the track, Redd raps about how he much prefers reliable friends to riches while making reference to the biblical Gates of Heaven, Pikachu and Berri's Cafe, a restaurant with two locations in Los Angeles, California. The outro to the song references the intro to the comedy show The Wayans Bros. On September 3, 2018, Trippie Redd posted a snippet of the song on Instagram, telling his fans to comment 70,000 times collectively for him to release the song. The post was removed a few days later.

The thirteenth song, "1400 / 999 Freestyle", samples Canadian R&B singer Plaza's 2016 song "Wanting You". The song marks the first collaboration between Juice Wrld and Trippie Redd. The song contains a "serene" piano riff and a "mysterious" woodwind-sounding synth. Juice Wrld performs the chorus and the first verse whilst Redd performs the second verse. Lyrically, the two rappers rap about having sex, as well as drugs and money. Charles Holmes of Rolling Stone described the rappers as "gleefully rapping for nearly three minutes about nothing" in the song. He added: "It's gloriously carefree, opting for nonsense that sounds good over any sort of lasting coherence. Nevertheless, Redd's verse is a speedy and furious tumble of syllables that crescendos when the Ohio MC perfectly ends the last six bars with transcendent 'yeah' adlibs." In September 2018, NoJumper released a vlog concerning the making of the song via YouTube, also including a short snippet. Redd then released a short snippet of this song on his Instagram story on October 10, 2018. In an interview with NoJumper, Redd stated: "We made a little quick hit. Our tape gon' be stupid, nigga." As of 2025, this collaborative project between Redd and Juice Wrld is yet to materialise. On the fourteenth track, "So Alive", Redd sings about how he feels alive when he's with his significant other. Simultaneously, he professes that he is willing to die for her. Reflecting on Redd's lyricism on the song, Vince Rick of HotNewHipHop observed: "[o]ver a Nellz beat woozy with negative space, Trippie Redd describes a love so redeeming it would save him from suicidal urges, and so moving that he would die for her. He trades mortality for mortality." The next song, "Diamond Minds", is an R&B-infused collaboration between Redd, Tory Lanez and Elliott Trent. Music criticism website OldMilk noted that the song follows a similar song structure present on the song "Red Bentley" by Juice Wrld and Future featuring Young Thug (Wrld on Drugs, 2018). Whilst both songs place their respective trio of rappers' verses back to back to back, "Diamond Minds" has no hook whereas "Red Bentley" has a hook that sandwiches the verses. The mixtape closes with "Camp Fire Tale", which is built on guitar riffs and a subsequent guitar solo provided by producer duo WE ARE THE STARS. Zach Colten of The Gatepost stated that the song was "a departure from the rapper's typical trap-punk mashup style."

== Packaging and promotion ==
In September 2018, Trippie Redd stated that the mixtape was "already done" but that he needed 2–3 more songs to complete it, and released an audio clip of "Topanga". On October 30, he released the cover art and track listing. This tracklist included the songs "Blastoff" and "Talk That Shit", neither of which made the final cut. "Blastoff" was later released as part of Internet Money's studio album B4 the Storm (2020).

The lead and sole single from A Love Letter to You 3, "Topanga", was released on October 22, 2018. A music video was released on October 30. Redd also performed the song on Zane Lowe's Beats 1 show and later The Tonight Show Starring Jimmy Fallon.

== Critical reception ==
Professional ratings
Review scores
| Source | Rating |
|---|---|
| HotNewHipHop | 'VERY HOTTTTT' |
| Exclaim! | 6/10 |
| Pitchfork | 6.6/10 |

The mixtape received acclaim; reviewers commended its creative direction and lauded the vocal performances displayed by Trippie Redd and his collaborators. However, Exclaim! and Pitchfork alone were more critical and criticised the length and uniformity of the project.

Charles Holmes of Rolling Stone noted that in releasing A Love Letter to You 3, Trippie Redd had joined the ranks of rappers including Kanye West, Lil Yachty and Migos in deploying more than one project in a year. Holmes commented that "[s]urprisingly, Redd seems rejuvenated, not depleted, by the increased pace." He added that "Redd is now making some of the best music of his career, even if it isn't necessarily the type that first broke him through the scene." Holmes praised the experimental nature of the sound, concluding that "A Love Letter To You 3 isn't perfect. At sixteen songs it's unnecessarily long, meandering in spots, but it succeeds on the back of Trippie's quest to make his next move weirder than his last." Karlton Jahmal of HotNewHipHop praised the mixtape's "euphoric vibe", writing that "Redd exudes a new sense of confidence as he maneuvers through his latest project. Maturity is welcome, and A Love Letter To You 3 illustrates the perfect evolution of Trippie." Zach Gidius of Osprey Online was highly complementary towards the project, highlighting the songs "Topanga", "Can't Love", "Love Scars 3", "1400 / 999 Freestyle" and particularly "Diamond Minds".

Mitch Findlay of HotNewHipHop concurred with Holmes that Trippie Redd had not been disadvantaged by his fast release schedule, writing: "As they say, the third time is often the charm. Trippie Redd's A Love Letter To You series has kept his name buzzing, and now, the third chapter of his series is upon us. Though Trippie is in the midst of a prolific year, there are some still awaiting his definitive moment, in which the full extent of his artistic potential is realized. It feels like A Love Letter To You 3 may very well be the moment fans have been anticipating." Findlay praised Redd's maturity in his songwriting, also observing that "[p]ristine production bubbles below Redd's often whimsical melodies, and surprising guest turns from Juice WRLD, YoungBoy Never Broke Again, and Tory Lanez make for admirable supporting characters, playing against type." He concluded that "[b]y the time "Camp Fire Tale" rolls around, it's all too easy to picture a smiling Trippie, guitar in hand, empty forty bottles strewn beside him, belting sweet nothings to all the woodland critters." Likewise, Vince Rick, also of HotNewHipHop, was positive towards Redd's "sweet, sugary" melodies. However, Rick was more critical towards the form of love expressed in the lyricism.

Zach Colten of The Gatepost compared the mixtape favorably to Life's a Trip and the previous mixtapes in the A Love Letter to You series, writing that "this installment ramps up the artist's energy and vision." Colten also praised Trippie Redd's "attention to detail and craftsmanship". The Talon's Kwinton Berry considered the project "one of Trippie's best albums, if not the best one he's released". The Hillsborough Voice placed it thirteenth on their list of the best albums of the year. Chase Ichiki of Revolt argued that one could "hear Trippie Redd's maturation from the previous two [A Love Letter to You mixtapes]." Music critic Anthony Fantano responded positively to the mixtape, awarding it 7/10. Fantano was complementary towards the direction and emotion of the mixtape. Although he criticized it for lacking variety between its tracks, he also noted that Redd's excellent vocal performances and clever use of guest features (for instance that of NBA YoungBoy) were more than enough to break the monotony. Trey Alston of Pitchfork reflected that the mixtape showcased Trippie Redd's growth as an artist, writing: "Gone are the simplistic choruses and general sleaze weighed down his songwriting; in its place is a multi-part refrain that indicates a degree of familiarity with his faults." Alston also discussed the consistency of the project, opining that "while consistency can be read as a strong point, it also makes these songs naggingly predictable. This is the third installment of his flagship series and, now, the tortured-soul act is wearing thin."

=== Year-end lists ===
Select year-end rankings for A Love Letter to You 3
| Publication | List | Rank | Ref. |
|---|---|---|---|
| Stereo Vision | The Top 50 Hip-Hop Projects of 2018 | 41 | |
| ThisSongIsSick | Top 20 Hip-Hop / R&B Albums Of 2018 | 20 | |
| The Hillsborough Voice | The top 20 hip hop albums of 2018 | 13 | |

== Commercial performance ==
On the chart dated November 24, 2018, A Love Letter to You 3 debuted at number three on the US Billboard 200 with 84,000 album-equivalent units (including 11,000 pure album sales). Thus the mixtape placed behind Kane Brown's Experiment (1) and Imagine Dragons' Origins (2), and in front of Lil Peep's Come Over When You're Sober, Pt. 2 (4). It is Trippie Redd's second US top-10 album, and marks the second time in three months that Redd has entered the top 5 of the Billboard 200. A Love Letter to You 3 is also Redd's highest-charting release to date. Additionally, the mixtape was the week's most-streamed album overall, with its tracks achieving 108.8 million on-demand streams. Redd also achieved his first No. 1 on the Top R&B/Hip-Hop Albums Billboard chart. In its second week, the mixtape dropped to number nine on the Billboard 200, earning 41,000 units. From the record project, "Topanga" (52), "1400 / 999 Freestyle" (55), "Love Scars 3" (73), "Negative Energy" (89) and "Toxic Waste" (98) all charted within the Billboard Hot 100. "Can't Love" (3), "A.L.L.T.Y. 3" (20), "Elevate & Motivate" (23) and "Fire Starter" (24) all charted within the Bubbling Under Hot 100. Responding to his immediate commercial success, Trippie Redd stated in an Instagram post: "I really don't think y'all understand how fuckn amazing you guys are... I mean honestly we just kinda showed our ass going this crazy no promo at all thank you my 1400/800 brothers & sisters💕 [sic]". He also thanked his personal team for "always pushing me and keeping my head up to show the world I'm here to stay."

On 8 October 2020, "Can't Love" achieved Gold certification from the Recording Industry Association of America (RIAA). On 21 July 2021, "Negative Energy" achieved Gold certification and "Love Scars 3" achieved Platinum certification. On 9 November 2022, "I Tried Loving" and "Toxic Waste" achieved Gold certification from the RIAA. On the same day, "Topanga" achieved double Platinum certification, whilst "1400 / 999 Freestyle" achieved triple Platinum certification. On 30 November 2022, "Loyalty Before Royalty" achieved Gold certification.

On November 9, 2022, A Love Letter to You 3 was certified Platinum by the Recording Industry Association of America (RIAA).

== Track listing ==
| No. | Title | Writer(s) | Producer(s) | Length |
|---|---|---|---|---|
| 1. | "Topanga" | Michael White IV; Darrell Jackson; Anthony Brown | Chopsquad DJ | 3:35 |
| 2. | "Fire Starter" (featuring Emani22) | White | Honorable C.N.O.T.E.; Tony Trouble | 2:37 |
| 3. | "Toxic Waste" | White | Diplo; King Henry; Scott Theft | 2:53 |
| 4. | "Negative Energy" (featuring Kodie Shane) | White | Staccato | 2:58 |
| 5. | "Can't Love" | White; Ozan Yıldırım | OZ | 2:49 |
| 6. | "Love Scars 3" | White; Yıldırım | OZ; Jacob Reske | 2:09 |
| 7. | "A.L.L.T.Y. 3" (featuring Baby Goth) | White; Baby Goth; Yıldırım | OZ; Dez Wright | 3:00 |
| 8. | "Emani Interlude" (featuring Emani22) | White | Foreign Teck; Tariq Beats; OZ | 1:36 |
| 9. | "Elevate & Motivate" (featuring YoungBoy Never Broke Again and Nel-Denarro) | White; Kentrell Gaulden; Nel-Denarro; Yıldırım | OZ; KrisChordz | 3:41 |
| 10. | "I Tried Loving" | White | Icon South | 3:13 |
| 11. | "Wicked" | White | OZ | 2:18 |
| 12. | "Loyalty Before Royalty" | White; Yıldırım; Masamune Kudo | OZ; Rex Kudo | 2:22 |
| 13. | "1400 / 999 Freestyle" (featuring Juice Wrld) | White; Jarad Higgins; Yıldırım | OZ; Pas Beatz; CujoBeatz | 2:55 |
| 14. | "So Alive" | White | Goose the Guru; Nellz | 1:59 |
| 15. | "Diamond Minds" (featuring Tory Lanez and Elliott Trent) | White; Daystar Peterson; Elliott Trent | Trent; 808-H | 3:05 |
| 16. | "Camp Fire Tale" | White · Austin Leech · Conner Leech | WE ARE THE STARS | 2:29 |
| Total length: | | | | 43:46 |

Notes

- The track "Topanga" features a prominent sample of Maurette Brown Clark's 2006 gospel song, "It Ain't Over".
- The track "Can't Love" samples "Buenos Genes" by Rels B and Dellafuente (2018).
- The track "I Tried Loving" incorporates a cadence from Rascal Flatts' "Life Is a Highway" (2006).
- The track "Wicked" includes a sample from "Closure" by Lapalux (featuring Szjerdene; 2015).
- The track "1400 / 999 Freestyle" samples "Wanting You" by Plaza (2016).

== Personnel ==
- Trippie Redd – primary artist, composition
- Baby Goth – featured artist
- Elliott Trent – featured artist, production, composition
- Emani22 – featured artist
- Juice WRLD – featured artist, composition
- Kodie Shane – featured artist, composition
- Nel-Denarro – featured artist, composition
- Tory Lanez – featured artist, composition, engineering
- YoungBoy Never Broke Again – featured artist, composition
- 808-H – producer
- ChopsquadDJ – producer
- Dez Wright – producer
- Diplo – producer
- Foreign Tek – producer
- Goose the Guru – producer
- Da Honorable C.N.O.T.E. – producer
- Icon South – producer
- Jacob Reske – producer
- King Henry – producer
- Krischordz – producer
- Nellz – producer
- OZ – producer
- Pas Beats – producer
- Rex Kudo – producer
- Staccato – producer
- Tariq Beats – producer
- Tony Trouble – producer
- WE ARE THE STARS – producer, composition
- Nick Barbs – A&R
- Rocket Da Goon – additional vocals
- Play Picasso – additional mixing
- Igor Mamet – recording, mixing, mastering
- Koen Heldens – mixing
- Brandon Brown – mixing assistance

== Charts ==
=== Weekly charts ===
| Chart (2018) | Peak position |
|---|---|
| Australian Albums (ARIA) | 36 |
| Belgian Albums (Ultratop Flanders) | 49 |
| Belgian Albums (Ultratop Wallonia) | 90 |
| Canadian Albums (Billboard) | 10 |
| Danish Albums (Hitlisten) | 28 |
| Dutch Albums (Album Top 100) | 19 |
| Estonian Albums (IFPI) | 21 |
| Finnish Albums (Suomen virallinen lista) | 47 |
| French Albums (SNEP) | 69 |
| Irish Albums (IRMA) | 32 |
| Latvian Albums (LAIPA) | 18 |
| New Zealand Albums (RMNZ) | 20 |
| Norwegian Albums (VG-lista) | 14 |
| Swedish Albums (Sverigetopplistan) | 30 |
| Swiss Albums (Schweizer Hitparade) | 62 |
| UK Albums (Official Charts) | 31 |
| US Billboard 200 | 3 |
| US Top R&B/Hip-Hop Albums (Billboard) | 1 |

=== Year-end charts ===
| Chart (2019) | Position |
|---|---|
| US Billboard 200 | 56 |
| US Top R&B/Hip-Hop Albums (Billboard) | 48 |

== Certifications ==
| Region | Certification | Certified units/sales |
|---|---|---|
| Canada (Music Canada) | Gold | 40,000^{‡} |
| United States (RIAA) | Platinum | 1,000,000^{‡} |
^{‡} Sales+streaming figures based on certification alone.
