= 6 Kiss =

6 Kiss may refer to:

- 6 Kiss (album), a 2009 album by Lil B
- "6 Kiss" (song), a 2019 song by Trippie Redd
