= Negative energy (disambiguation) =

Negative energy is a concept used in physics to explain the nature of certain fields.

Negative energy may also refer to:

- Negative energy (esotericism)
- "Negative Energy" (song), a 2018 song by Trippie Redd
- Negative Energy Plane in Dungeons & Dragons

== See also ==
- Negative-index metamaterial
- Negative resistance in electronics
