= A Love Letter to You 5 =

Mixtape by Trippie Redd
- Released: August 11, 2023
- Genre: Hip-hop; R&B; trap; emo rap
- Length: 51:18
- Label: 10K Projects; 1400 Entertainment
- Producer: 012; 808-H; Aldae Long; Andrew; Anina Shona; Antonio "Dopamine" Zito; Anthoine Walters; C-Gutta; Charlie Coffeen; Cxdy; FnZ; FrankieOnTheGuitar; Fraxille; Frev; Greg Sekeres; Hammad Beats; Honorable C.N.O.T.E.; Igor Mamet; Jai Beats; Justice; Kobe; LaVoyce; Luke Crowder; Matty Spats; Niketaz; Omer Fedi; OneintheForest; Oz; PAX; Puku; Rex Kudo; Rvssian; Seb; Trademark; Zodiac

Trippie Redd chronology
Mansion Musik (2023)	A Love Letter to You 5 (2023)	Saint Michael (2023)

A Love Letter to You mixtapes chronology
A Love Letter to You 4 (2018)	A Love Letter to You 5 (2023)

Singles from A Love Letter to You 5
- 1. "Took My Breath Away" Released: June 16, 2023; 2. "Hurts Me" Released: June 27, 2023; 3. "Last Days" Released: July 25, 2023; 4. "Left 4 Dead" Released: August 4, 2023; 5. "Closed Doors" Released: August 11, 2023

A Love Letter to You 5 (often abbreviated as ALLTY5) is the fifth commercial mixtape, and sixth overall, by American rapper Trippie Redd. It is also the fifth installment in the A Love Letter to You mixtape series. It was released through 10k Projects and 1400 Entertainment on August 11, 2023. The mixtape follows his fifth studio album Mansion Musik (2023). The project features guest appearances from Corbin, Skye Morales, Lil Wayne, Roddy Ricch, The Kid Laroi, Tommy Lee Sparta, Bryson Tiller and Tory Lanez. It serves as the fifth and final installment of his A Love Letter to You series, following 2019's A Love Letter to You 4.

== Background ==
In December 2021, Trippie announced in a now-deleted Instagram story that he was working on the mixtape.

The mixtape's track listing was announced on July 24, 2023. The second single for the mixtape, "Last Days" was released the next day, on July 25, 2023. On August 3, 2023, it was announced that the mixtape's release would be delayed by one week from August 4 to August 11 due to sample clearance issues. Instead, the mixtape's third single, "Left 4 Dead" would later on be released on August 4, 2023.

== Critical reception ==
Professional ratings
Review scores
Source	Rating
AllMusic	3/5 stars
Clash	7/10
HipHopDX	2.3/5
Slant Magazine	3/5 stars

Writing for Clash, Shanté Collier-McDermott praised the mixtape's themes, stating: "Redd does well to continuously write raw relevant music. The mixtape is vulnerable and showcases a special level of artistry as he delves into several different pockets of love songs." In his review for Slant Magazine, Paul Attard writes that the mixtape was an improvement over Mansion Musik, but not "particularly noteworthy". HipHopDX's Ben Brutocao criticized the album's production and writing, concluding: "The constituent tracks are nearly all dispassionate, market-tested gruel. It's as romantic as a Hallmark Valentine's card, and sonically interesting as whatever is playing in Macy's whenever you happen to stroll by."

== Track listing ==
A Love Letter to You 5 track listing
No.	Title	Writer(s)	Producer(s)	Length
1.	"Take Me Away" (featuring Corbin)	Michael Lamar White; Igor Mamet	Igor Mamet; Justice; Trademark; Rex Kudo; Andrew	3:21
2.	"Last Days"	White; Zodiac; PAX	Zodiac; PAX	2:34
3.	"Thy Motion"	White; Mamet	Mamet; Niketaz	2:28
4.	"How You Alive"	White; Mamet	Mamet; OZ; Charlie Coffeen	2:55
5.	"Thinking Bout You"	White; Mamet	Mamet; Greg Sekeres; Hammad Beats	2:46
6.	"Praying 4 Love"	White; Mamet	Mamet; Omer Fedi	2:36
7.	"Reality"	White; Mamet	Mamet; Seb	2:54
8.	"A Feeling" (featuring Skye Morales)	White; Skye Morales; Shane Lee Lindstrom	Murda Beatz; LaVoyce	2:47
9.	"Romantic Fantasy"	White; Mamet	Mamet; Jai Beats	2:51
10.	"I'm Mad at Me" (featuring Lil Wayne)	White; Mamet	Mamet; Anina Shona; 012; Kobe; Niketaz	3:12
11.	"Closed Doors" (with Roddy Ricch)	White; Mamet; Rodrick Wayne Moore	Mamet; Puku; Niketaz; OneintheForest	2:48
12.	"Action"	White; Mamet	Mamet; Cxdy; FrankieOnTheGuitar; OneintheForest	2:01
13.	"Left 4 Dead"	White; Mamet	Mamet; Aldae Long; Kobe; Andrew; Charlie Coffeen; Fraxille	1:58
14.	"Wind" (featuring the Kid Laroi)	White; Charlton Kenneth Jeffrey Howard; Ace G. Auzthekid; Anthoine Walters; Antonio "Dopamine" Zito; Michael Mulé; Isaac De Boni; Jocelyn Donald; zZz	Mamet; Antonio "Dopamine" Zito; Anthoine Walters; FnZ	2:50
15.	"Helicopter" (featuring Tommy Lee Sparta)	White; Tarik Johnston	Rvssian	2:22
16.	"Took My Breath Away" (featuring Skye Morales)	White; Morales; Mamet	Mamet; 808-H; Kobe	3:00
17.	"Flowers" (featuring Bryson Tiller)	White; Mamet; Bryson Djuan Tiller	Mamet; C Gutta; Luke Crowder; Frev; OneintheForest	3:23
18.	"The Hate"	White; Mamet	Mamet; Kobe; Matty Spats	1:55
19.	"Trip McKnight"	White; Carlton Davis Mays	Honorable C.N.O.T.E.	2:37
Total length:				51:18

A Love Letter to You 5 (Bonus) track listing
No.	Title	Writer(s)	Length
20.	"Hurts Me" (with Tory Lanez)	White; Daystar Peterson
Total length:			54:00

== Charts ==
Chart performance for A Love Letter to You 5
Chart (2023)	Peak position
Canadian Albums (Billboard)	78
New Zealand Albums (RMNZ)	32
US Billboard 200	13
US Top R&B/Hip-Hop Albums (Billboard)	3
