= 1400 / 999 Freestyle =

2018 song by Trippie Redd featuring Juice Wrld

Song by Trippie Redd featuring Juice Wrld

from the album A Love Letter to You 3
- Released: November 9, 2018
- Genre: Trap; hip-hop; freestyle
- Length: 2:55
- Label: TenThousand
- Songwriters: Michael White IV; Jarad Higgins; Ozan Yildirim
- Producers: OZ; Pas Beatz; Cujo

"1400 / 999 Freestyle" is a song by American rapper Trippie Redd featuring Juice Wrld. It was released on November 9, 2018 as a track from the former's third commercial mixtape A Love Letter to You 3 (2018). The song was produced by OZ and Pas Beatz, and samples Canadian R&B singer Plaza's 2016 song "Wanting You".

== Composition ==
The song contains a "serene" piano riff and a "mysterious" woodwind sounding synth. Juice Wrld performs the chorus, which appears only in the beginning and end, and the first verse; Trippie Redd performs the second verse. The song sees the rappers rhyming about having sex, as well as drugs and money. Redd also sings about his "oh-so-broken heart" in his verse.

== Critical reception ==
Charles Holmes of Rolling Stone described the rappers as "gleefully rapping for nearly three minutes about nothing" in the song. He then added, "It's gloriously carefree, opting for nonsense that sounds good over any sort of lasting coherence. Nevertheless, Redd's verse is a speedy and furious tumble of syllables that crescendos when the Ohio MC perfectly ends the last six bars with transcendent 'yeah' adlibs." Trey Alston called Juice Wrld's feature an "eye-rolling tough guy act".

== Charts ==
Chart (2018)	Peak position
Canada Hot 100 (Billboard)	76
New Zealand Hot Singles (RMNZ)	7
US Billboard Hot 100	55
US Hot R&B/Hip-Hop Songs (Billboard)	24

== Certifications ==
Region	Certification	Certified units/sales
Brazil (Pro-Música Brasil)	Gold	20,000^{‡}
Canada (Music Canada)	3× Platinum	240,000^{‡}
New Zealand (RMNZ)	Platinum	30,000^{‡}
United Kingdom (BPI)	Silver	200,000^{‡}
United States (RIAA)	3× Platinum	3,000,000^{‡}
^{‡} Sales+streaming figures based on certification alone.
