= Bust Down (song) =

2017 single by Trippie Redd

Single by Trippie Redd

from the album A Love Letter to You 2
- Released: September 15, 2017
- Genre: Trap
- Length: 4:06
- Label: TenThousand Projects
- Songwriters: Michael White IV; Goose the Guru
- Producer: Goose the Guru

Trippie Redd singles chronology
"Fuck Love" (2017)	"Bust Down" (2017)	"ILL NANA" (2017)

Music video
- "Bust Down" on YouTube

"Bust Down" is a song by American rapper Trippie Redd and is the third single and intro track from his second commercial mixtape A Love Letter to You 2. It was released on September 15, 2017. The song was produced by Goose the Guru.

== Credits and personnel ==
- Trippie Redd – vocals, songwriting
- Goose the Guru – production, songwriting
- Igor Mamet – mastering, mixing, recording

== Sequel ==
On November 22, 2019, Trippie released Bust Down Deux on his A Love Letter to You 4 mixtape.

== Certifications ==
Region	Certification	Certified units/sales
Canada (Music Canada)	Gold	40,000^{‡}
United States (RIAA)	Platinum	1,000,000^{‡}
^{‡} Sales+streaming figures based on certification alone.
