= Wopavelli 3 =

2017 mixtape by Lil Wop

Mixtape by Lil Wop
- Released: October 27, 2017
- Recorded: August–October 2017
- Genre: Rap; horrorcore
- Length: 39:24
- Label: 1017 Eskimo
- Producer: Digital Nas; Kenny Beats; 808-H; BrentRambo; CHASETHEMONEY; Evil Haze; Honorable C.N.O.T.E.

Lil Wop chronology
Wopavelli 2 (2017)	Wopavelli 3 (2017)	Angels & Demons (2017)

Wopavelli 3 (Note: Sometimes spelled as "Wopaveli 3") is a mixtape by American rapper Lil Wop. It was released on October 27, 2017, as his first project under Gucci Mane's label, 1017 Eskimo.

== Background ==
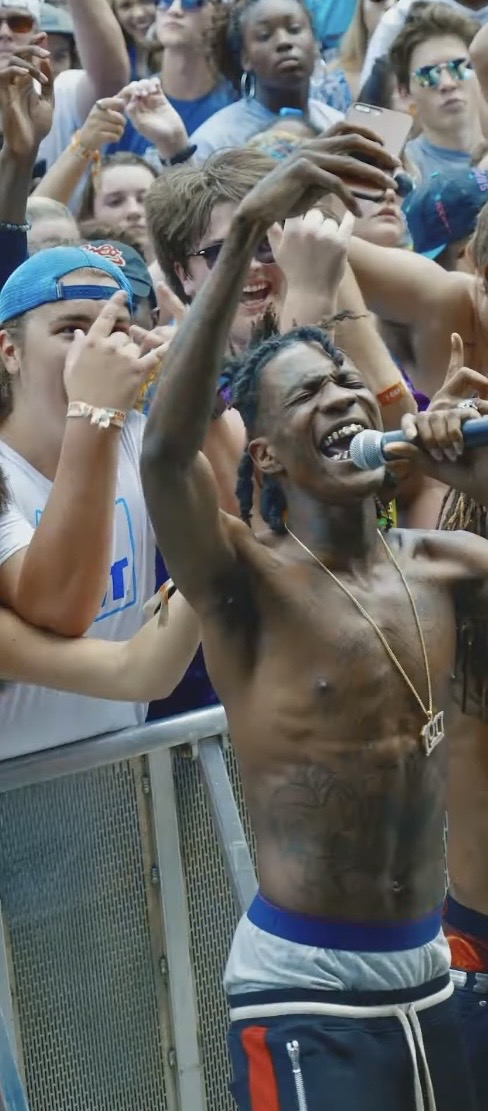
Lil Wop performs the track "Sinister" for the first time at the Music Midtown festival in Atlanta, Georgia

In August 2017, Lil Wop signed to Gucci Mane's 1017 Eskimo label, a partnership with Alamo Records. On October 23, Lil Wop announced that his first release under 1017, Wopavelli 3, was slated to be released four days later. (Note: The mixtape was originally scheduled to be released on October 31, 2017.) Accompanying the announcement was an early release of the track "Wokstar".

Wopavelli 3 features a previously available song by Lil Wop, "Friday the 13th", which he described as "[representing his] life and love of scary movies". On October 26, "Paid in Full", featuring Gucci Mane, was released one day early. Lil Wop stated that it was the first song recorded at the label's studio and that Gucci Mane had surprised him with the guest appearance.

== Critical reception ==
Evan Rytlewski, writing for Pitchfork, gave Wopavelli 3 a rating of 6.8/10, calling it a "wildly fun but sometimes rough listen" which "taps into the same vein of showmanship and exploitation as so many '80s metal acts".

In a review on HotNewHipHop, Mitch Findlay wrote that the mixtape is abundant with "feverish ad-libs" and that "Lil Wop's voice might take some getting used to" due to his "slow, methodical rasp", which "creaks over a beat like a slow-opening door".

Office Magazine described the mixtape simply as "spooky and freaky".

== Track listing ==
Production credits adapted from Apple Music.

No.	Title	Producer(s)	Length
1.	"Gucci"	Digital Nas	1:24
2.	"Skitz"	Digital Nas	1:55
3.	"Paid in Full" (featuring Gucci Mane)	Honorable C.N.O.T.E.	3:39
4.	"Wokstar"	808-H	2:24
5.	"Topgolf"	Kenny Beats	2:50
6.	"Murder Rate"	Digital Nas	2:35
7.	"Swerve"	BrentRambo	1:50
8.	"Hard Rock" (featuring Lil Wopster)	Digital Nas	2:15
9.	"Dope Man"	Kenny Beats	2:07
10.	"Walking Dead"	Kenny Beats	2:21
11.	"Friday the 13th"	Kenny Beats	2:19
12.	"Sinister"	Evil Haze	1:50
13.	"Soul Snatcher"	808-H	1:38
14.	"Grow Up"	Kenny Beats	2:34
15.	"1017 Freestyle"	Digital Nas	2:38
16.	"Xans"	Kenny Beats; CHASETHEMONEY	2:35
17.	"Snakes"	Digital Nas	2:20
Total length:			39:24
