= Angels & Demons (EP) =

EP by Trippie Redd and Lil Wop
- Released: October 31, 2017
- Genres: Hip-hop; emo rap
- Length: 13:41
- Label: 10K Projects
- Producers: 4point0Lehgo; Digital Nas; Gamer Boomin; Nikko Bunkin

Trippie Redd chronology
A Love Letter to You 2 (2017)	Angels & Demons (2017)	Life's a Trip (2018)

Lil Wop chronology
Wopavelli 3 (2017)	Angels & Demons (2017)	Silent Hill (2018)

Angels & Demons is a collaborative extended play by American rappers Trippie Redd and Lil Wop, released on October 31, 2017, through 10K Projects. The project was exclusively made available through the streaming platform SoundCloud. Production was helmed by 4point0Lehgo, with other contributions coming from Digital Nas, Gamer Boomin and Nikko Bunkin.

The project is Redd's sixth and Wop's first EP. It received unanimous critical praise.

== Background and promotion ==
The EP was a surprise release, and was released just days after Lil Wop's project Wopavelli 3.

On June 19, 2017, in an interview with Precise Earz, Trippie Redd and Wop (accompanied by fellow rappers Rocket Da Goon and Chris King) stated that the cover art and title for the project were derived from nicknames given to them. Wop has been playfully described as a 'demon' by Redd and other friends, whilst Redd represents the 'angel', and is associated with the angel number 1400.

== Critical reception ==
Professional ratings
Review scores
Source	Rating
HotNewHipHop	'VERY HOTTTTT'

Chantilly Post of HotNewHipHop wrote that "The project is mostly subtle bangers with chill beats and the echoing sounds from Trippie and Wop coming though, rapping about not "needing that bitch no more". Davis Huynh of Hypebeast labelled the EP a "short-but-sweet compilation" and a "surprise Halloween treat." Peter A. Berry of XXL wrote that "The new release features the two rappers' typically entertaining vocal stylings merged with mellow, energetic bangers perfect for a fall night. It's a perfect way to reinforce your Halloween playlist, which should already include Skepta's Vicious EP and 21 Savage, Offset and Metro Boomin's Without Warning." Berry added: "For Lil Wop, who's Gucci's ace protégé, it's another solid release just days after he dropped his Wopavelli 3 project. For Trippie, who might have a collab with Drake on the way, it's another way to ensure he's always in your rotation."

== Track listing ==
Angels & Demons track listing
No.	Title	Writer(s)	Producer(s)	Length
1.	"Like A Savage"	Michael Lamar White II; Louis Corey McPherson	4point0Lehgo	2:13
2.	"In A Daze"	White; McPherson	Digital Nas	2:54
3.	"Gave Her Soul Away"	White; McPherson	Gamer Boomin; Nikko Bunkin	2:26
4.	"Gleam"	White; McPherson	4point0Lehgo	2:21
5.	"Too Long"	White; McPherson	4point0Lehgo	3:47
Total length:				13:41

Notes

- The track "In A Daze" is stylized in all capitals
