= Beast Mode ++++ =

EP by Trippie Redd and Pi'erre Bourne
- Released: October 19, 2016
- Genres: Hip-hop; emo rap
- Label: 10K Projects
- Producers: Pi'erre Bourne; Rasta Papii

Trippie Redd chronology
Awakening My InnerBeast (2016)	Beast Mode ++++ (2016)	A Love Letter to You (2017)

Pi'erre Bourne chronology
The Life of Pi'erre (2016)	Beast Mode ++++ (2016)	The Life of Pi'erre 2 (2016)

Beast Mode ++++ is a collaborative extended play by American rapper Trippie Redd and American producer Pi'erre Bourne, released on October 19, 2016, through 10K Projects. The project was exclusively made available through the streaming platform SoundCloud. Production was almost entirely handled by Bourne, with one additional credit from Rasta Papii. The project is Redd's second and Bourne's third EP.

The song "Qs and Ps" received particular attention in the underground.

== Background and promotion ==
The album artwork was created by EverythingWithHood.

== Critical reception ==
In 2017, Alphonse Pierre of HotNewHipHop wrote that "Trippie was able to showcase his strengths over the course of a concise 5 songs, each track hovering around 2 minutes." Writing for Pitchfork in 2020, Pierre labelled "Qs and Ps" Trippie Redd and Pi'erre Bourne's "best track together." He added: "Bourne's production is rich with sounds that clash without detracting from each other, like gears grinding. It's so bright that it's eerie, like going on a slow ride through "It's a Small World" at Disneyland."

== Track listing ==
Beast Mode ++++ track listing
No.	Title	Writer(s)	Producer(s)	Length
1.	"Qs and Ps"	Jordan Timothy Jenks; Michael Lamar White II	Pi'erre Bourne	2:18
2.	"Young Wild Boys"	Jenks; White	Pi'erre Bourne	2:57
3.	"Solar Flare"	Jenks; White	Pi'erre Bourne	2:31
4.	"Too late"	Jenks; White	Pi'erre Bourne	2:34
5.	"Heartbreak-14"	Ezekiel Henry; Jenks; White	Rasta Papii; Pi'erre Bourne	2:24

Notes

- The track "Qs and Ps" samples "Accordion" (Madvillainy, 2004) by Madvillain
- The track "Heartbreak-14" is stylized in all capitals
