= Lil Wop =

American rapper (born 1995)

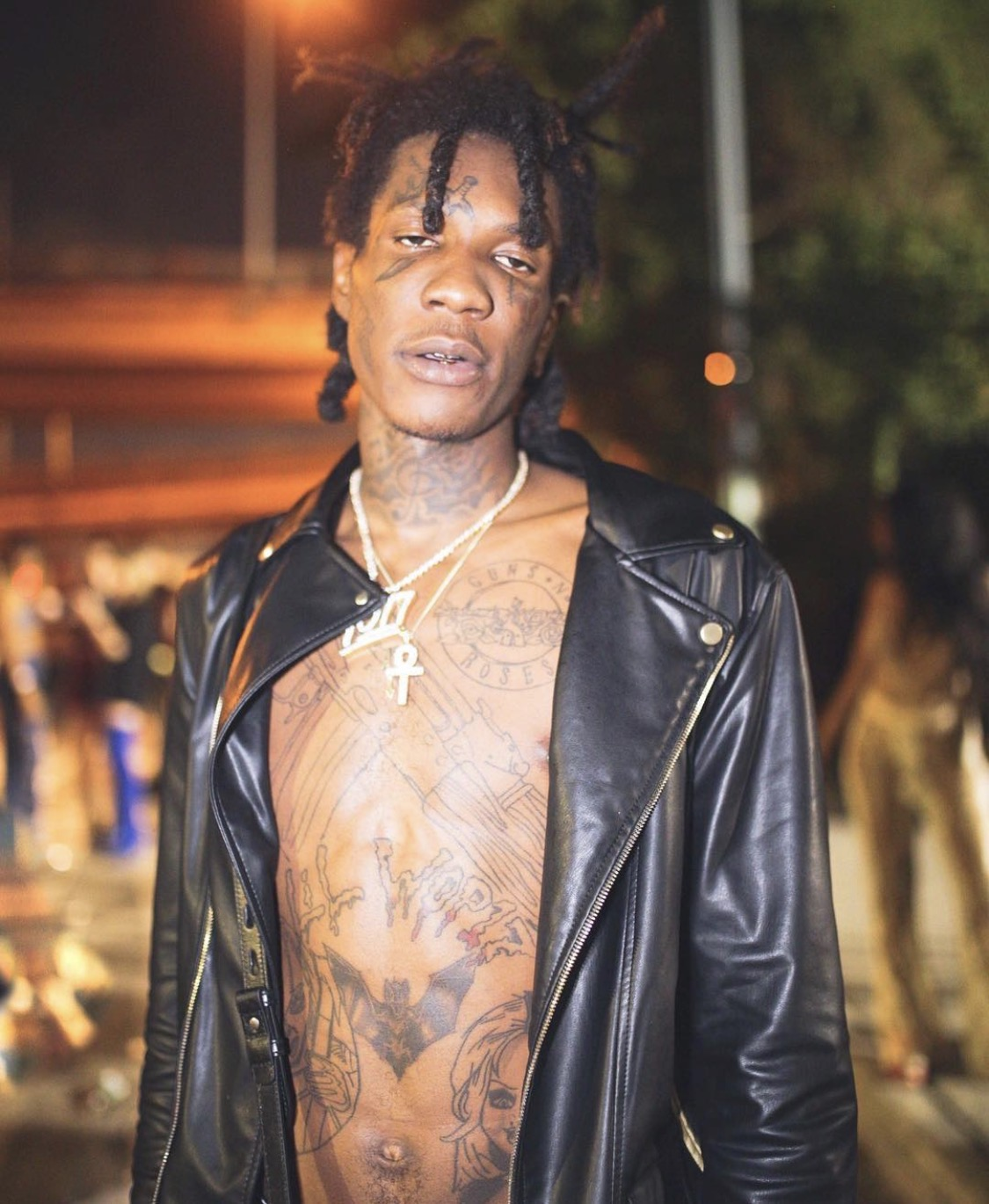
- Lil Wop in 2018

Background information
- Also known as: Lil Wop 17; Lil Wopster; Young Loucane
- Born: Louis Corey McPherson; October 17, 1995 (age 31); Chicago, Illinois, U.S.
- Origin: Atlanta, Georgia, U.S.
- Genres: Southern hip-hop; trap; horrorcore
- Occupations: Rapper; songwriter; producer
- Years active: 2014–2024
- Labels: 1017; Alamo; Interscope; EMPIRE; Base Loaded
- Relatives: Famous Dex (cousin)

Louis Corey McPherson (born In Chicago, Illinois In October 17, 1995), known professionally as Lil Wop, is an American former rapper from Atlanta, Georgia. He was signed to Atlanta-based rapper Gucci Mane's 1017 Records in 2017. He is primarily known for his association with Gucci Mane and Trippie Redd.

== Career ==
Lil Wop began his music career in 2014 while in Chicago under the moniker Young Loucane. He was also briefly associated through music with Chicago rapper King Yella after meeting him through Yella's brother, Oso Rico. Wop appeared on many tracks with them, such as "Trap Shit" with Oso Rico and "Aww Man Gmix", with King Yella. In 2016, when he moved to Atlanta and changed his name to Lil Wop, his relationships with King Yella and Oso Rico gradually began to fade. In late 2016, when Lil Wop became friends and collaborators with Trippie Redd, they worked together on many tracks across both artists' projects on songs such as "Trap", "Gave Her Soul Away", and "Lone Werewolf". On October 17, 2016, Lil Wop released his debut project under the Lil Wop moniker, Wopster. On April 20, 2017, he dropped his mixtape Wake-N-Bake. In the summer of 2017, rapper Gucci Mane signed him to his record label, 1017 Eskimos, in a joint venture with Alamo Records. In April 2017, Lil Wop released his single "Gotcho Bitch" with his cousin, Famous Dex. On October 31, 2017, he released a collaborative mixtape with Trippie Redd titled Angels & Demons. In July 2018, Lil Wop featured on Toronto rap duo CMDWN's single "Hit & Run". In August 2018, he released his EP Silent Hill, which contained open verses. On October 31, 2018, Lil Wop released his project Wopavelli 4. In March 2022, he insulted his former manager, Gucci Mane, calling him a "weirdo" and revealed that he was no longer signed to 1017 Records.

== Musical style ==
Lil Wop's musical style has been compared to that of 21 Savage and Young Thug.

== Personal life ==
Lil Wop is the cousin of rapper Famous Dex. Lil Wop is known for his tall height of 6 feet and 7 inches. In 2016, he moved to Atlanta from Chicago at the suggestion of his friend Bosskota. Lil Wop has a son, who was born in early 2017. In February 2022, he came out as bisexual via a post on his Instagram account. Following rumors about his sexual orientation, Lil Wop participated in an interview with Internet personality "DJ Smallz Eyes", identifying as a straight man. In August 2023, Lil Wop stated that he no longer intends to transition. However, in a January 2025 Instagram post, he replied to a follower, "[I'm a girl]", correcting them for using the wrong pronoun.

== Legal issues ==
On May 29, 2018, Lil Wop and Trippie Redd were arrested after allegedly getting into a physical altercation with rapper FDM Grady. Lil Wop was charged with two counts of simple battery, while Trippie Redd was charged with three. On July 28, 2024, Lil Wop was arrested in Lawrenceville, Georgia, and was held in Gwinnett County Jail for drug-related charges and criminal attempt to commit a felony after he illegally tried to occupy someone's residence. On October 13, 2024, Lil Wop was arrested after being caught masturbating in a hotel stairwell. In January 2025, police bodycam footage of the incident was released by news outlet XXL.

== Discography ==
Studio albums

- Parental Advisory (self-released, 2022)

Mixtapes

- Wopster (self-released, 2016)
- Wopavelli (Hosted by DJ Shon) (Bases Loaded Records, 2017)
- Wake-N-Bake (Bases Loaded Records, 2017)
- Picasso Wop (self-released, 2017)
- Wopavelli 2 (Bases Loaded Records, 2017)
- Wopavelli 3 (1017 Eskimos/Alamo/Interscope/Polydor, 2017)
- Picasso Wop 2 (self-released, 2018)
- Wopavelli 4 (1017 Eskimos/Alamo/Interscope/Polydor, 2018)
- Wopster 2 (self-released, 2020)
- Friday the 17th (self-released, 2020)
- Enchanted (self-released, 2020)
- Say Cheese (self-released, 2021)
- Savage (self-released, 2022)
- Super Grimey (self-released, 2022)
- Halloween (self-released, 2022)
- Infinite (self-released, 2023)
- Nightmare Before Christmas (self-released, 2024)

EPs

- Angels & Demons (with Trippie Redd) (916% Entertainment, 2017)
- Silent Hill (1017 Records, 2018)
- XVII (self-released, 2019)
- Light (self-released, 2020)
- Zero Gravity (self-released, 2021)
- Royal Princess (self-released, 2024)
