= Poles 1469 =

2017 single by Trippie Redd featuring 6ix9ine

Single by Trippie Redd featuring 6ix9ine

from the album A Love Letter to You
- Released: April 27, 2017
- Recorded: 2016–2017
- Genre: Hip hop; trap; cloud rap
- Length: 2:29
- Label: TenThousand Projects
- Songwriters: Michael White; Daniel Hernandez; Jordan Jenks
- Producer: Pi'erre Bourne

Trippie Redd singles chronology
"Love Scars" (2016)	"Poles 1469" (2017)	"It Takes Time" (2017)

6ix9ine singles chronology
"Poles 1469" (2017)	"Gummo" (2017)

Music video
- "Poles 1469" on YouTube

"Poles 1469" is a song by American rapper Trippie Redd featuring fellow American rapper 6ix9ine. Produced by Pi'erre Bourne, it was released on April 27, 2017, as the second single from Trippie Redd's debut mixtape A Love Letter to You (2017). The song served as an early introduction to 6ix9ine for many listeners, predating his breakthrough debut solo single "Gummo" by several months.

== Background ==
Trippie Redd, born Michael White II in Canton, Ohio, began releasing music on SoundCloud in late 2016, garnering early attention with "Love Scars." "Poles 1469" was recorded during 2016–2017 and produced by Pi'erre Bourne (born Jordan Timothy Jenks), a Columbia, South Carolina-based producer known for his airy, trap-influenced sound and work with artists including Playboi Carti, Lil Uzi Vert, and Young Nudy.

According to a 2018 Rolling Stone profile, early in 2017 Trippie Redd invited 6ix9ine (born Daniel Hernandez) to California to feature on the song. The song's success helped spark a bidding war among labels to sign 6ix9ine, who ultimately signed with 10K Projects over larger advances from Warner Bros. and Sony.

The full mixtape A Love Letter to You premiered via The Fader in May 2017, with the outlet describing Trippie Redd's hook-making ability and confessional writing as immediately standing out.

== Critical reception ==
Trevor Smith of HotNewHipHop regarded the song as a highlight of A Love Letter to You, praising the vocal contrast between Trippie Redd's melodic delivery and 6ix9ine's more confrontational style, and noting that Bourne's atmospheric production suited Trippie Redd's approach.

== Music video ==
The official music video was released simultaneously with the single on April 27, 2017. It features Trippie Redd and 6ix9ine performing among crew members in urban settings, with sequences emphasizing themes of bravado consistent with the track's trap style.

== Legacy ==
"Poles 1469" marked 6ix9ine's first widely heard appearance. According to Rolling Stone, the song's success helped launch his recording career, leading to his signing with 10K Projects and the subsequent release of "Gummo" (2017), which peaked at number 12 on the US Billboard Hot 100.

== Charts ==
Chart (2017–18)	Peak position
US Bubbling Under Hot 100 (Billboard)	8
US Hot R&B/Hip-Hop Songs (Billboard)	44

== Certifications ==
Region	Certification	Certified units/sales
Canada (Music Canada)	Platinum	80,000^{‡}
New Zealand (RMNZ)	Gold	15,000^{‡}
United States (RIAA)	Platinum	1,000,000^{‡}
^{‡} Sales+streaming figures based on certification alone.
