= Love Me More (Trippie Redd song) =

2019 single by Trippie Redd

Single by Trippie Redd

from the album A Love Letter to You 4
- Released: November 1, 2019
- Genre: Emo rap
- Length: 2:23
- Label: 10k; Caroline
- Songwriter(s): Michael White IV; Nicholas Mira; Danny Snodgrass, Jr.
- Producer(s): Nick Mira; Taz Taylor

Trippie Redd singles chronology
"Mac 10" (2019)	"Love Me More" (2019)	"Death" (2019)

Music video
- "Love Me More" on YouTube

"Love Me More" is a song by American rapper Trippie Redd, released on November 1, 2019, as the lead single from his fourth mixtape A Love Letter to You 4 (2019). It was written by Trippie Redd and its producers, Nick Mira and Taz Taylor.

== Music video ==
The music video was released along with the single on November 1, 2019. It was directed by James Mackel. It starts off with Trippie Redd "wrapped in a tight embrace" with a partner, then shows the couple in a car driving throughout a city, with Redd resting his head lovingly on her shoulder. The video also shows his partner sliding down a pole and entertaining, which Trippie wishes the vision is reality.

== Charts ==
Chart performance for "Love Me More"
Chart (2019–2020)	Peak position
Canada (Canadian Hot 100)	100
New Zealand Hot Singles (RMNZ)	17
US Billboard Hot 100	79
US Hot R&B/Hip-Hop Songs (Billboard)	37

== Certifications ==
Certifications for "Love Me More"
Region	Certification	Certified units/sales
Canada (Music Canada)	Gold	40,000^{‡}
United States (RIAA)	Platinum	1,000,000^{‡}
^{‡} Sales+streaming figures based on certification alone.
