= Who Needs Love =

Single by Trippie Redd

from the album A Love Letter to You 4
- Released: November 19, 2019
- Genre: Emo rap
- Length: 2:38
- Label: 10k
- Songwriters: Michael White IV; Igor Mamet; Jose Velazquez
- Producer: Angel Lopez

Trippie Redd singles chronology
"Death" (2019)	"Who Needs Love" (2019)	"Bad Vibes Forever" (2019)

Music video
- "Who Needs Love" on YouTube

"Who Needs Love" is a song by American rapper Trippie Redd from his fourth mixtape A Love Letter to You 4 (2019). It is the third single from the mixtape, released on November 19, 2019. The song was produced by Angel Lopez.

== Composition ==
On the track, Trippie Redd sings over a looped acoustic guitar instrumental about his aversion towards love, and that he is "living his best life post-breakup". He likely disses his ex-girlfriend, American rapper Coi Leray.

== Charts ==
Chart (2019)	Peak position
Canada Hot 100 (Billboard)	75
New Zealand Hot Singles (RMNZ)	21
US Billboard Hot 100	58
US Hot R&B/Hip-Hop Songs (Billboard)	26

== Certifications ==
Region	Certification	Certified units/sales
Brazil (Pro-Música Brasil)	Gold	20,000^{‡}
Canada (Music Canada)	Gold	40,000^{‡}
New Zealand (RMNZ)	Gold	15,000^{‡}
Portugal (AFP)	Gold	5,000^{‡}
United States (RIAA)	Platinum	1,000,000^{‡}
^{‡} Sales+streaming figures based on certification alone.
