= A Love Letter to You 2 =

Mixtape by Trippie Redd
- Released: October 6, 2017
- Recorded: 2017
- Genres: Emo rap; SoundCloud rap
- Length: 47:55
- Labels: 10k; Caroline
- Producers: 12Hunna; Apollo 7ven; ArnoldIsDead; Digital Nas; DY; Hollywood Don; FourtyEight; Goose the Guru; Grey Goon; Onassis Morris; Paris the Producer; Tayo Fetti; Young God

Trippie Redd chronology
A Love Letter You’ll Never Get... (2017)	A Love Letter to You 2 (2017)	Angels & Demons (2017)

A Love Letter to You mixtapes chronology
A Love Letter to You (2017)	A Love Letter to You 2 (2017)	A Love Letter to You 3 (2018)

Singles from A Love Letter to You 2
- 1. "Woah Woah Woah (Ft. Bali Baby)" Released: August 19, 2017; 2. "I Know How to Self Destruct" Released: August 19, 2017; 3. "Bust Down" Released: September 15, 2017; 4. "In Too Deep" Released: September 27, 2017

A Love Letter to You 2 (often abbreviated as ALLTY2) is the second commercial mixtape by American rapper Trippie Redd. It is also the second installment in the A Love Letter to You mixtape series. It was released on October 6, 2017, by TenThousand Projects and Caroline Distribution. It is the second release into Trippie Redd's A Love Letter to You series, of which began in May 2017. The album reached number 34 on the US Billboard 200. The mixtape featured guest appearances from Khalil, Cydnee with a C, Forever Anti Pop, Bali Baby, Chris King, UnoTheActivist and Rocket Da Goon.

== Background ==
The mixtape followed suit within five months after the release of the first installment in the A Love Letter to You series. The tracks "In Too Deep", "Woah Woah Woah" and "I Know How to Self Destruct" were made available prior to the release of the full mixtape. On September 11, 2017, Trippie Redd revealed the release date and cover art, which is a collage of photos from his childhood.

== Critical reception ==
Professional ratings
Review scores
Source	Rating
AllMusic	2.5/5 stars
HipHopDX	3.1/5
HotNewHipHop	70%
Pitchfork	6.4/10

Alphonse Pierre of HotNewHipHop stated that while he felt Trippie Redd is a "future star", A Love Letter to You 2 was not the "right project to get him there". Pierre wrote that "A couple of good, scratch that, great collaborations with ParisTheProducer, Goose the Guru and Digital Nas aren't enough to completely overshadow Trippie's bad decision-making and indecisiveness on A Love Letter To You 2", saying that once it seems like Trippie has found his "groove" on the mixtape, he follows it with songs like "Hellboy" that include "cliche rhyming patterns" and "mood-killing production". Sheldon Pearce of Pitchfork called the mixtape "all hooks, all emotion, but features poorly designed songs that lack the spark of his previous mixtape", elaborating that "Few songs on A Love Letter to You 2 have more than one Trippie verse. There are songs where he only sings the chorus. Those hooks are usually just echoes, the same word, phrase, or basic idea repeated or reiterated. [...] Still, nearly every Trippie song can be enjoyable on the condition you don't pay too close attention."

Davis Huynh of Hypebeast said that the mixtape had "garnered much critical acclaim amongst fans on social media."

== Track listing ==
No.	Title	Producer(s)	Length
1.	"Bust Down"	Paris the Producer; Goose the Guru	4:05
2.	"Feel Good" (with Khalil and Cydnee with a C)	Paris the Producer; Goose the Guru	3:20
3.	"In Too Deep"	Paris the Producer	3:43
4.	"Deadman's Wonderland" (with FOREVER ANTi PoP)	Goose the Guru	3:57
5.	"Woah Woah Woah" (with Bali Baby)	Young God	3:42
6.	"Back of My Mind" (with Chris King and Cydnee with a C)	Grey Goon	4:46
7.	"Today" (with UnoTheActivist)	Tayo Fetti; Goose the Guru	3:37
8.	"Hellboy"	Apollo 7ven; Onassis Morris	3:08
9.	"Back Back Back"	Digital Nas	3:59
10.	"Dangerous" (with Rocket Da Goon and Chris King)	FourtyEight	3:47
11.	"Overweight" (featuring Chris King)	DY; 12Hunna	3:17
12.	"Overdose on L1fe"	ArnoldIsDead; Goose the Guru	2:04
13.	"I Know How to Self Destruct"	Young God	1:42
14.	"Let Me Down"	Hollywood Don	2:48
Total length:			48:00

== Charts ==
Chart (2017)	Peak position
US Billboard 200	34
US Independent Albums (Billboard)	39
US Top R&B/Hip-Hop Albums (Billboard)	19
