= Kodie Shane =

American singer

- Born: Kodie Williams; October 28, 1998 (age 27); Atlanta, Georgia
- Genres: Hip hop; alternative R&B; trap; pop-rap
- Occupations: Singer; rapper
- Years active: 2016–present
- Labels: Epic; Young Heart Throb
- Website: kodieshane.com

Kodie Shantil Marr (born Kodie Williams on October 28, 1998), better known by her stage name Kodie Shane, is an American rapper and singer. She gained recognition in 2016 for her song "Sad" featuring rapper Lil Yachty, and as a member of Sailing Team, a collective of rappers led by Lil Yachty.

== Early life ==
Kodie Shane was born on October 28, 1998, in Atlanta and was raised in Chicago. She grew up into a family of musicians: her father Danny C. Williams, a hairstylist, was a part of the Detroit R&B trio Rick, Ran & Dan and also sang in background vocals for her aunt, who is the singer Cherrelle; her sister is Brandi Williams of the girl group Blaque. Taking interest in music at a very young age, Kodie remembered following her sister's tours since she was a baby.

== Career ==
=== 2016: Beginnings ===
Around the age of 14, Kodie Shane began rapping and recorded the first rap song she ever wrote, "Crown Me". At 14, she wrote a song titled "Sad", which would then become her breakout single in 2016. At that age, she would also tag along to a studio owned by her mother. She first worked as a writer for the Atlanta production studio, overseen by D. Clax and Matty P. Warm, both of whom would be future collaborators with her. Shane was later discovered by Atlanta record manager Coach K, when Matty P showed her music to him. In early 2016, Coach K introduced Shane to rapper Lil Yachty, during one of his concerts; the two rappers quickly became friends. After Shane played "Sad" to Lil Yachty, he added his own verse to the track. Gaining recognition with the collaboration, Shane signed to Epic Records in 2015 and also joined the Sailing Team, a collective of rappers led by Lil Yachty, later that year, being the only female member. In August 2016, Lil Yachty released his song "All In" featuring the Sailing Team, giving Shane further attention for her guest appearance. Shane's second EP, Zero Gravity, was released on December 2, 2016, with "Sad" as its lead single.

=== 2017–present ===
In August 2017, Shane released her third EP, Back to the Future. Her debut studio album, Young HeartThrob, was released in November 2018. It features guest appearances from Trippie Redd and TK Kravitz.

== Personal life ==
Shane prefers women and describes herself as queer.
