= Bali Baby =

American rapper

- Born: Kaitlin Corin Fletcher; June 15, 1997 (age 29); Jacksonville, North Carolina
- Origin: Atlanta, Georgia
- Genres: Hip hop; rap rock; trap
- Occupations: Rapper; songwriter
- Instrument: Vocals
- Years active: 2016–present
- Labels: TWIN; Billmania Media; PlayHouse Music; Asylum

Kaitlin Corin Fletcher (born June 15, 1997), known under the name Bali Baby, is an American rapper based out of Atlanta, Georgia. In 2018, i-D magazine described Bali Baby as "one of very few openly gay female rappers with any skin in the game." In March 2018, LA Weekly's Shirley Ju described Bali Baby as "the hottest female rap artist to come out of Atlanta."

== Career ==
Her career as a rapper began in 2016 when she produced the freestyle rap song "Designer". Her breakthrough mixtape was Bali's Play 2, which was released in 2017. On March 30, 2018, she released the five-track EP Bali Blanco, which represented her sixth release overall. Her debut studio album, Baylor Swift, was released in May 2018. It features a more distorted, rock-centered sound than most of her previous work. She has been named as an influencer by ppcocaine.

== Discography ==
=== Studio albums ===
Title	Album details
Baylor Swift	Released: May 8, 2018; Label: TWIN; Formats: Digital download, streaming
Resurrection	Released: October 30, 2018; Label: TWIN; Formats: Digital download, streaming
Baliprint	Released: June 17, 2023; Label: RBC Records; Formats: Digital download, streaming

=== Mixtapes ===
Title	Mixtape details
Brazy Bali	Released: November 1, 2016; Label: Billmania Media, PlayHouse Music; Formats: Digital download
Bubbles Bali	Released: January 4, 2017; Label: Billmania Media; Formats: Digital download
Bali's Play 2	Released: June 26, 2017; Label: Billmania Media; Formats: Digital download
The Book of Bali (Note: This mixtape was released exclusively on SoundCloud.)	Released: November 1, 2019; Label: Billmania Media; Formats: Digital download

=== EPs ===
Title	EP details
Bali Blanco	Released: March 30, 2018; Label: Self-released; Formats: Digital download
Lost Flies Vol. 1	Released: October 21, 2021; Label: Create Music Group; Formats: Digital download, streaming
The Book of Bali, Vol. 2	Released: August 25, 2023; Label: RBC Records; Formats: Digital download, streaming

=== Singles ===
==== As a lead artist ====
Title	Year	Album
"Right Now" (featuring Lotto Savage)	2017	Brazy Bali
"Bible" (featuring Zay Hilfigerr)	2017	Non-album singles
"Make It Pop"	2017	Non-album singles
"Enemies"	2017	Non-album singles
"Elastic"	2017	Non-album singles
"Banana Klip"	2017	Non-album singles
"Vlone Tatted" (featuring ManMan Savage)	2017	Non-album singles
"Coupe"	2017	Non-album singles
"WWW"	2017	Baylor Swift
"Miley Cyrus"	2018	Non-album single
"Futurama"	2018	Resurrection
"Flavors"	2018	Bali Blanco
"Winter Wonderland"	2018	Bali Blanco
"Backseat"	2018	Baylor Swift
"Few Things"	2018	Baylor Swift
"Amber Alert"	2018	Resurrection
"Game Over"	2018	Resurrection
"Professor Finessor"	2019	Non-album singles
"Swiper No Swiping"	2019	Non-album singles
"Blueberry" (with Charlotte Devaney)	2019	Non-album singles
"Miss CEO"	2019	Non-album singles
"Shadow of Death" (with Swaray)	2019	Non-album singles
"Can You"	2020	The Book of Bali
"Nasty"	2020	Non-album singles
"Sucker"	2020	Non-album singles
"Freestyle"	2021	Non-album singles
"X-Rated" (with DAGR)	2021	DAGR
"Waddup Bitch"	2021	Non-album singles
"Bad Influence" (with Tinywiings)	2022	Non-album singles
"Chips n' Dip" (with Novul)	2022	Non-album singles
"Fuck It Up"	2022	Baliprint
"Purple"	2022	Baliprint
"Heaux" (with Young X)	2022	A Kngs Ransom
"Trap Party" (with Big Boss Mulaa)	2022	Non-album single
"Cocky"	2022	Baliprint
"Rogue" (with Majorlilkween)	2022	Non-album single
"Dirty Pixx" (with Love Ghost)	2022	Dark Phoenix
"OMFG" (featuring Ashes and Strgurrl)	2023	Non-album singles
"Hypnotize"	2023	Non-album singles
"Where YBA?"	2023	Non-album singles
"Bitches in Paris" (featuring Majorlilkween)	2023	The Book of Bali, Vol.2

==== As featured artist ====
Title	Year	Album
"Woah Woah Woah" (Trippie Redd featuring Bali Baby)	2017	A Love Letter to You 2
