= Death (Trippie Redd song) =

Single by Trippie Redd featuring DaBaby

from the album A Love Letter to You 4
- Released: November 12, 2019
- Genre: Hip hop; trap
- Length: 2:52
- Label: 10k; Caroline
- Songwriters: Michael White IV; Jonathan Kirk; Paul Beauregard; Tim Moore; Reginald Boyland
- Producers: DJ Paul; TWhy Xclusive

Trippie Redd singles chronology
"Love Me More" (2019)	"Death" (2019)	"Who Needs Love" (2019)

DaBaby singles chronology
"Boss Friends" (2019)	"Death" (2019)	"1+1" (2019)

Music video
- "Death" on YouTube

"Death" is a song by American rapper Trippie Redd featuring fellow American rapper DaBaby. It was released on November 12, 2019 as the second single from his fourth commercial mixtape A Love Letter to You 4 (2019). The track was released under Trippie Redd's labels 1400 Entertainment and 10k Projects. Produced by DJ Paul and TWhy Xclusive, the song samples "Hit A Muthafucka" by hip hop group Three 6 Mafia, which DJ Paul is part of.

== Controversy ==
In March 2020, Trippie Redd and DJ Paul were sued by Reginald Boyland, the owner of the record label On The Strength Records, for using the sample of "Hit A Muthafucka" in the song. In his lawsuit, Boyland stated that obtained the rights to the sampled song in a 2015 settlement with DJ Paul. Boyland claimed that "Hit A Muthafucka" sampled his track "Pimps in the House". According to Boyland, he also told both Paul and Redd that he owed a portion of "Death" profits but received no response.

== Charts ==
Chart (2019)	Peak position
Canada Hot 100 (Billboard)	58
US Billboard Hot 100	59
US Hot R&B/Hip-Hop Songs (Billboard)	26
US Hot Rap Songs (Billboard)	19

== Certifications ==
Region	Certification	Certified units/sales
Canada (Music Canada)	Gold	40,000^{‡}
United States (RIAA)	Platinum	1,000,000^{‡}
^{‡} Sales+streaming figures based on certification alone.
