= 6 Kiss (song) =

2019 song by Trippie Redd featuring Juice Wrld and YNW Melly

Song by Trippie Redd featuring Juice Wrld and YNW Melly

from the album A Love Letter to You 4
- Released: November 22, 2019
- Recorded: 2019
- Length: 3:19
- Label: TenThousand
- Songwriters: Michael White IV; Jarad Higgins; Jamell Demons; Nicholas Mira; Danny Snodgrass Jr.
- Producers: Nick Mira; Taz Taylor

"6 Kiss" is a song by American rapper Trippie Redd featuring fellow American rappers Juice Wrld and YNW Melly. It was released from as a track from the former's fourth commercial mixtape A Love Letter to You 4 on November 22, 2019. The song was written alongside producers Nick Mira and Taz Taylor. It was also the last song by Juice Wrld to be released within his lifetime, as he died of a drug overdose less than a month after the song's release.

== Composition ==
The song features a "slow-paced" beat. It opens with crooning from Juice Wrld, who sings the first verse. The next two verses are performed by YNW Melly and Trippie Redd respectively.

== Critical reception ==
Alex Zidel of HotNewHipHop praised the song, writing, "This is one of the better songs from Redd's new album and, to be completely honest, it might be one of the smoothest cuts he's ever released."

Ryan Feyre of RapReviews gave a critical review of the song, describing it as one which Trippie Redd is "less enjoyable" and calling it "awkward". He went on to write, "Juice WRLD and YNW Melly do their best to illustrate the "666" life without first taking into account the implications for what they're saying. It's especially cringe-worthy when the one who's incarcerated is still talking about murder. The whole thing is a weird tonal switch-up that feels like a throwaway."

== Charts ==
Chart (2019)	Peak position
Canada Hot 100 (Billboard)	64
Ireland (IRMA)	97
New Zealand Hot Singles (RMNZ)	15
US Billboard Hot 100	60
US Hot R&B/Hip-Hop Songs (Billboard)	28

== Certifications ==
Region	Certification	Certified units/sales
Canada (Music Canada)	Gold	40,000^{‡}
United States (RIAA)	Platinum	1,000,000^{‡}
^{‡} Sales+streaming figures based on certification alone.
