= Love Scars =

Single by Trippie Redd

Single by Trippie Redd

from the album A Love Letter to You
- Released: November 24, 2016
- Genre: Emo rap, R&B
- Length: 2:23
- Label: TenThousand
- Songwriters: Michael White; Elliott Trent
- Producer: Trent

Trippie Redd singles chronology
"Love Scars" (2016)	"Poles 1469" (2017)

Music video
- "Love Scars" on YouTube

"Love Scars" is a song by American rapper Trippie Redd, first released through SoundCloud on November 24, 2016. It gained traction in 2017, becoming one of his most popular songs, and appears on his debut commercial mixtape A Love Letter to You (2017).

== Background ==
Trippie Redd said that the song was made in Columbus, Ohio, and he recorded it in one take in a dark room. He originally created a song called "Long Way Home From Mars / Love Scars", but he separated it into two songs. The song also uses samples from the video game Metroid Prime.

The song began garnering attention in early 2017, and propelled him to mainstream success. Redd later stated that he knew "Love Scars" would be a hit, and that he had its title tattooed on him before he recorded the song: "I just got it tatted on my face, and then, ever since after that, I made a song after the tat, and that s**t just blew up ... I knew it was gonna blow up. I felt it – just the energy I gave in that song, the vibe."

== Charts ==
Chart (2017)	Peak position
US Bubbling Under Hot 100 (Billboard)	15
US Bubbling Under Hot R&B/Hip-Hop Songs	1

== Certifications ==
Region	Certification	Certified units/sales
Canada (Music Canada)	2× Platinum	160,000^{‡}
New Zealand (RMNZ)	Gold	15,000^{‡}
United States (RIAA)	2× Platinum	2,000,000^{‡}
^{‡} Sales+streaming figures based on certification alone.
