= A Love Letter to You =

Mixtape by Trippie Redd
- Released: May 14, 2017
- Recorded: 2016–2017
- Genre: Hip hop; trap; emo rap
- Length: 36:06
- Label: 10K; Caroline
- Producer: Elliot Trent; ParisTheProducer; 12Hunna; Goose the Guru; Pi'erre Bourne; Elf Beatz; P. Soul; Cesar P; DP Beats; Peyote Beats; DJ Flippp

Trippie Redd chronology
Beast Mode ++++ (2016)	A Love Letter to You (2017)	A Love Letter to You 2 (2017)

A Love Letter to You mixtapes chronology
A Love Letter to You (2017)	A Love Letter to You 2 (2017)

Singles from A Love Letter to You
- 1. "Love Scars" Released: November 24, 2016; 2. "Poles 1469" Released: April 27, 2017; 3. "It Takes Time" Released: May 12, 2017

A Love Letter to You (often abbreviated as ALLTY or ALLTY1) is the debut commercial mixtape by American rapper Trippie Redd. It is also the first installment in the A Love Letter to You mixtape series. It was released on May 26, 2017, by TenThousand Projects and Caroline Distribution. Between its twelve songs, the mixtape features guest appearances from Chris King, Forever Anti Pop, UnoTheActivist, Famous Dex, 6ix9ine, Pachino, Black Jezuss, Lil Tracy and Rocket Da Goon. Production was primarily handled by 12Hunna, with other contributions coming from DJ Flippp, Goose the Guru, Elliot Trent, Pi'erre Bourne, and others.

A Love Letter to You was supported by three singles: "Love Scars" (November 24, 2016), "Poles 1469" (April 27, 2017), and "It Takes Time" (May 12, 2017). It was Redd's breakout project, and spawned the release of four sequels between 2017 and 2023. The mixtape peaked at number 64 on the Billboard 200, and was also acclaimed by critics. On June 20, 2019, A Love Letter to You was certified Gold by the Recording Industry Association of America (RIAA). On November 9, 2022, the mixtape's certification was upgraded to Platinum.

== Background and promotion ==
The lead single from the project, called "Love Scars" premiered on November 24, 2016 on SoundCloud, before later being released to iTunes. The mixtape's other two singles, "Poles 1469" and "It Takes Time", were released on April 27, 2017, and May 12, 2017, respectively.

== Songs ==
A Love Letter to You's first song and lead single, "Love Scars", was created in Columbus, Ohio in one take. Trippie Redd originally created a song called "Long Way Home From Mars / Love Scars", but later separated it into two songs. "Love Scars" also uses samples from the video game Metroid Prime. The song began garnering popularity in early 2017 – Michael Saponara of XXL wrote that it garnered "significant buzz" – precipitating the release of a music video on June 25, 2017. Redd later stated that he knew "Love Scars" would be a hit, and that he had its title tattooed on him (beneath his left eye) before he recorded the song: "I just got it tatted on my face, and then, ever since after that, I made a song after the tat, and that s**t just blew up ... I knew it was gonna blow up. I felt it – just the energy I gave in that song, the vibe." The next track, "Love Scars, Pt. 2 / Rack City" (featuring Chris King and FOREVER ANTi PoP), serves as the sequel to "Love Scars". On October 2, 2017, Redd released a music video for the track in collaboration with Lyrical Lemonade. Ben Dandridge-Lemco of The Fader wrote that the artists in the video "pose in ominously lit surroundings." Commenting on the video in an email to The Fader, Redd said: "I'm pushing all the limits with everything; I can't be like everybody else ... Wait til you hear A Love Letter to You 2." On June 12, 2017, Redd released a music video for "Romeo & Juliet", exclusively released with WorldStarHipHop. Redd released a music video for "Blade of Woe" in collaboration with No More Heroes on May 10, 2017. Elevator Mag described the video as "a tripped-out, gritty visual that brings the track to life perfectly". "It Takes Time" samples a voice memo in its intro.

The track "Poles 1469" was produced by Pi'erre Bourne and features 6ix9ine, the latter of whom Redd invited to California to record for the song. The track propelled 6ix9ine to fame, predating his breakthrough debut solo single "Gummo" by several months. It also sparked a bidding war among labels to sign him; 6ix9ine ultimately signed with Redd's label 10K Projects over advances from Warner Bros. and Sony. The official music video was released simultaneously via Fck Them with the single on April 27, 2017. In 2021, British singer Pink Pantheress listed the song as part of her Halloween playlist via Nylon, writing: "Trippie Redd gets into his emo bag sometimes and when he does it slaps, this song isn’t even Halloween-y – I just like it."

== Critical reception ==
Professional ratings
Review scores
Source	Rating
HotNewHipHop	'HOTTTTT'

A Love Letter to You received acclaim from critics. Ben Dandridge-Lemco of The Fader wrote that Trippie Redd's "hook-making ability and confessional writing immediately stand out." Milca P. of HotNewHipHop said that "Redd's A Love Letter to You doesn't differ much from his winning formula of harmonious delivery, keeping it consistent with sing-songy lyrics taking their place over lively production."

Writing after the release of A Love Letter to You 2 (October 2017), Sheldon Pearce of Pitchfork wrote that A Love Letter to You "earned its title, mixing scrawled bawler raps in with tortured ballads." He noted the melodrama of songs including "Deeply Scared" and "Romeo & Juliet", and reserved particular praise for "Love Scars", calling it "a gripping tune that makes plain the ache and (seemingly) life-or-death seriousness of teenage romance". Trevor Smith of HotNewHipHop regarded Poles 1469 as a project highlight, praising the vocal contrast between Trippie Redd's melodic delivery and 6ix9ine's more confrontational style, and noting that Bourne's atmospheric production suited Redd's approach.

== Legacy and influence ==
In November 2018, The Nicholls Worth included A Love Letter to You in its list of the best mixtapes of the past decade, alongside Acid Rap (Chance the Rapper, 2013), Days Before Rodeo (Travis Scott, 2014), No Ceilings (Lil Wayne, 2009), Barter 6 (Young Thug, 2015), and Luv Is Rage (Lil Uzi Vert, 2015). Writing for the publication, Damian Lefort and Levin Pinho said that "With the melodic, yet street accredited A Love Letter to You, Trippie Redd created an unbelievably repeatable debut mixtape ... the tape continues to be a centerpiece of the increasingly popular rapper’s career." They added that it offered "a very likeable tracklist" and was "a timeless project."

== Commercial performance ==
A Love Letter to You reached number 64 on the Billboard 200 for the chart dated January 27, 2018. The following week, the project reached number 32 on the US Top R&B/Hip-Hop Albums chart. By March 2018, the mixtape had earned almost 300,000 album-equivalent units. From the record project, "Poles 1469" (8) and "Love Scars" (15) charted within the Bubbling Under Hot 100.

On 8 October 2020, "Love Scars Pt. 2 / Rack City" achieved Gold certification from the Recording Industry Association of America (RIAA). On June 20, 2019, "Poles 1469" achieved Platinum certification. "It Takes Time" and "Romeo & Juliet" followed suit on 21 July 2021. On 8 October 2020, "Love Scars" achieved double Platinum certification. On November 9, 2022, A Love Letter to You was certified platinum by the Recording Industry Association of America (RIAA) for combined sales and album-equivalent units of over 10,000,000 units in the United States.

== Track listing ==
A Love Letter to You
No.	Title	Producer(s)	Length
1.	"Love Scars"	Elliot Trent	2:23
2.	"Love Scars, Pt. 2 / Rack City" (featuring Chris King and FOREVER ANTi PoP)	12Hunna; DJ Flippp	2:35
3.	"Romeo & Juliet"	ParisTheProducer; Goose the Guru	3:28
4.	"Deeply Scared" (featuring UnoTheActivist)	12Hunna	3:20
5.	"Blade of Woe" (featuring Famous Dex)	12Hunna; DJ Flippp	3:08
6.	"It Takes Time"	Goose the Guru	4:42
7.	"Poles 1469" (with 6ix9ine)	Pi'erre Bourne	2:29
8.	"No Smoke No Smoke 1400 B.C. / Sauce" (featuring Pachino)	Elf Beatz	2:27
9.	"Stoves On 14th" (featuring Black Jezuss)	Cesar P	2:20
10.	"Limitless" (featuring Lil Tracy and Rocket Da Goon)	DP Beats	4:00
11.	"Can You Rap Like Me?"	P. Soul	2:42
12.	"Never Ever Land"	Peyote Beats	2:26
Total length:			36:05

Notes

- The track "Love Scars" uses samples from the video game Metroid Prime
- Lil Tracy and Rocket Da Goon were later removed from the track "Limitless"

== Charts ==
=== Weekly charts ===
Chart (2017–18)	Peak position
US Billboard 200	64
US Top R&B/Hip-Hop Albums (Billboard)	32

=== Year-end charts ===
Chart (2018)	Position
US Billboard 200	164
US Top R&B/Hip-Hop Albums (Billboard)	76

== Certifications ==
Region	Certification	Certified units/sales
Canada (Music Canada)	Gold	40,000^{‡}
United States (RIAA)	Platinum	1,000,000^{‡}
^{‡} Sales+streaming figures based on certification alone.
