= List of 2020 albums =

The following is a list of albums, EPs, and mixtapes released in 2020. These albums are (1) original, i.e. excluding reissues, remasters, and compilations of previously released recordings, and (2) notable, defined as having received significant coverage from reliable sources independent of the subject.

For additional information about bands formed, reformed, disbanded, or on hiatus, for deaths of musicians, and for links to musical awards, see 2020 in music.

== First quarter ==
=== January ===
List of albums released in January 2020
Go to: January | February | March | April | May | June | July | August | September | October | November | December | Back to top
Release date	Artist	Album	Genre	Label	Ref.
January 1	Brett Kissel	Now or Never	Country	Warner Music Canada	
January 3	David Bisbal	En Tus Planes		Signature, Wrasse	
January 3	Stabbing Westward	Dead and Gone	Industrial rock	Drugstore Records	
January 7	B.O.Y	Phase One: You		The Music Works	
January 7	SF9	First Collection	K-pop	FNC, Kakao M	
January 7	Verivery	Face Me		Jellyfish	
January 8	DreamNote	Dream Wish		iMe Korea	
January 10	Alexandra Savior	The Archer		30th Century Records	
January 10	Apocalyptica	Cell-0	Cello metal, symphonic metal, progressive metal	Silver Lining Music	
January 10	The Big Moon	Walking Like We Do		Fiction	
January 10	Circa Waves	Happy		PIAS, Prolifica Inc.	
January 10	Cory Wong	Elevator Music for an Elevated Mood		Cory Wong	
January 10	Easy Life	Junk Food		Island	
January 10	Echosmith	Lonely Generation		Echosmith Music LLC	
January 10	Field Music	Making a New World		Memphis Industries	
January 10	Georgia	Seeking Thrills		Domino	
January 10	King Gizzard & the Lizard Wizard	Live in Adelaide '19		King Gizzard & the Lizard Wizard	
January 10	King Gizzard & the Lizard Wizard	Live in Paris '19		King Gizzard & the Lizard Wizard	
January 10	Lane 8	Brightest Lights		This Never Happened	
January 10	Poppy	I Disagree	Heavy metal, pop, electropop	Sumerian	
January 10	Rage	Wings of Rage	Power metal, heavy metal, thrash metal	SPV/Steamhammer	
January 10	RuPaul	You're a Winner, Baby		RuCo Inc.	
January 10	Selena Gomez	Rare	Pop, dance	Interscope	
January 10	Tenille Arts	Love, Heartbreak, & Everything in Between	Country	19th & Grand Record, Reviver Records	
January 11	Beach Slang	The Deadbeat Bang of Heartbreak City		Bridge 9	
January 14	Hayley Kiyoko	I'm Too Sensitive for This Shit		Empire, Atlantic	
January 15	Cable Ties	Far Enough	Punk rock, garage rock	Poison City	
January 15	King Gizzard & the Lizard Wizard	Live in Brussels '19		King Gizzard & the Lizard Wizard	
January 15	King Gnu	Ceremony	Alternative rock	Ariola Japan	
January 17	070 Shake	Modus Vivendi	Emo rap	GOOD, Def Jam	
January 17	AJJ	Good Luck Everybody	Folk punk, indie rock	AJJ Unlimited LTD	
January 17	Algiers	There Is No Year		Matador	
January 17	...And You Will Know Us by the Trail of Dead	X: The Godless Void and Other Stories	Post-hardcore, alternative rock	Dine Alone	
January 17	Anti-Flag	20/20 Vision	Punk rock	Spinefarm	
January 17	Bleed the Sky	This Way Lies Madness		Art is War Records	
January 17	Bombay Bicycle Club	Everything Else Has Gone Wrong		Island, Caroline, Arts & Crafts	
January 17	Chelsea Cutler	How to Be Human		Republic	
January 17	Courteeners	More. Again. Forever.	Pop, psychedelic	Ignition	
January 17	Dustin Lynch	Tullahoma	Country	Broken Bow	
January 17	Eminem	Music to Be Murdered By	Hip-hop, horrorcore	Shady, Aftermath, Interscope	
January 17	Francisca Valenzuela	La Fortaleza	Pop	Sony Music Chile	
January 17	Gabrielle Aplin	Dear Happy		Never Fade, AWAL	
January 17	A Girl Called Eddy	Been Around		Elefant	
January 17	Halsey	Manic	Electropop, hip-hop, alternative rock	Capitol	
January 17	Holy Fuck	Deleter			
January 17	The Innocence Mission	See You Tomorrow		Bella Union, Thérèse Records	
January 17	Little Big Town	Nightfall	Country	Capitol Nashville	
January 17	Louise	Heavy Love	Funk, gospel, R&B	Lil Lou, Warner	
January 17	Mac Miller	Circles	Hip-hop, funk, emo rap	Warner	
January 17	Mura Masa	R.Y.C.		Polydor	
January 17	New Riders of the Purple Sage	Bear's Sonic Journals: Dawn of the New Riders of the Purple Sage	Country rock	Owsley Stanley Foundation	
January 17	Of Montreal	Ur Fun	Synth-pop, bubblegum pop	Polyvinyl	
January 17	Pinegrove	Marigold		Rough Trade	
January 17	The Professionals	The Professionals	Hip-hop	Madlib Invazion	
January 17	Raül Refree & Lina	Lina_Raül Refree	Fado	Glitterbeat	
January 17	Sons of Apollo	MMXX	Progressive metal, hard rock	Inside Out, Sony Music	
January 17	La Zowi	Élite			
January 24	Les Amazones d'Afrique	Amazones Power	World	Real World	
January 24	Andy Shauf	The Neon Skyline		Arts & Crafts, Anti-	
January 24	Annihilator	Ballistic, Sadistic	Thrash metal	Silver Lining Music	
January 24	Breaking Benjamin	Aurora	Post-grunge, nu metal, acoustic	Hollywood	
January 24	Colony House	Leave What's Lost Behind		Roon Records	
January 24	J Hus	Big Conspiracy	Afroswing	Black Butter	
January 24	Marko Hietala	Pyre of the Black Heart	Hard rock, heavy metal, progressive rock	Nuclear Blast	
January 24	Myke Towers	Easy Money Baby		White World Music	
January 24	Nektar	The Other Side		Esoteric Antenna	
January 24	Noir Désir	Débranché		Universal	
January 24	Pet Shop Boys	Hotspot	Synth-pop, dance-pop	x2	
January 24	Tauren Wells	Citizen of Heaven	CCM	Provident	
January 24	Twin Atlantic	Power	Alternative rock	Virgin EMI	
January 24	Wire	Mind Hive	Art punk, post-punk	Pinkflag	
January 24	We Are the City	RIP			
January 24	Wolf Parade	Thin Mind	Indie rock	Sub Pop	
January 29	Lovebites	Electric Pentagram	Power metal	Victor	
January 29	Tricot	Makkuro		Cutting Edge	
January 31	Blossoms	Foolish Loving Spaces		Virgin EMI	
January 31	Chillinit	The Octagon		420 Family	
January 31	Clint Lowery	God Bless the Renegades		Rise	
January 31	Dan Deacon	Mystic Familiar	Electropop, indietronica, experimental rock	Domino	
January 31	Destroyer	Have We Met		Merge, Dead Oceans	
January 31	Drive-By Truckers	The Unraveling		ATO	
January 31	Dune Rats	Hurry Up and Wait		Ratbag Records, BMG	
January 31	Grateful Dead	Dave's Picks Volume 33	Rock	Rhino	
January 31	Kate Ceberano, Steve Kilbey and Sean Sennett	The Dangerous Age			
January 31	Kesha	High Road	Pop	Kemosabe, RCA	
January 31	K. Michelle	All Monsters Are Human	R&B	eOne	
January 31	Krewella	Zer0	Electronic	Mixed Kids	
January 31	Lil Wayne	Funeral	Hip-hop	Young Money, Republic	
January 31	Lordi	Killection	Heavy metal	AFM	
January 31	Louis Tomlinson	Walls	Indie rock, indie pop, pop rock	Arista	
January 31	Luke James	to feel love/d	R&B		
January 31	Meghan Trainor	Treat Myself	Pop, doo-wop, funk	Epic	
January 31	Poliça	When We Stay Alive		Memphis Industries	
January 31	Ryan Beatty	Dreaming of David		Mad Love, Interscope	
January 31	Squarepusher	Be Up a Hello	Drum and bass, jazz, ambient	Warp	
January 31	Tall Tall Trees	A Wave of Golden Things		Joyful Noise	
January 31	Theory of a Deadman	Say Nothing		604, Atlantic, Roadrunner	
January 31	Torres	Silver Tongue		Merge	

=== February ===
List of albums released in February 2020
Go to: January | February | March | April | May | June | July | August | September | October | November | December | Back to top
Release date	Artist	Album	Genre	Label	Ref.
February 3	GFriend	Labyrinth	K-pop, synth-pop, EDM	Source, Kakao M	
February 5	Bis	Lookie	Pop-punk, dance-punk	Nippon Crown	
February 5	Loona	[#]	K-pop	Blockberry Creative	
February 7	2 Chainz and T.R.U.	No Face No Case	Hip-hop	Atlantic	
February 7	Against All Logic	2017-2019	Electronic	Other People	
February 7	Ásgeir	Bury the Moon	Indie folk, folktronica	One Little Indian	
February 7	Aubrie Sellers	Far from Home	Country		
February 7	Brent Faiyaz	Fuck the World	R&B	Lost Kids	
February 7	Christian McBride	The Movement Revisited	Jazz	Mack Avenue	
February 7	D Smoke	Black Habits	Hip-hop	Woodworks Records, Empire	
February 7	Danna Paola	Sie7e +	Latin pop	Universal Music México	
February 7	Delain	Apocalypse & Chill	Symphonic metal	Napalm	
February 7	Denzel Curry and Kenny Beats	Unlocked	Hip-hop	Loma Vista	
February 7	Galantis	Church		Atlantic	
February 7	Green Day	Father of All Motherfuckers	Garage rock, alternative rock, garage punk	Reprise	
February 7	HMLTD	West of Eden	Art punk	Lucky Number Music	
February 7	La Roux	Supervision	Pop	Supercolour Records	
February 7	Loathe	I Let It In and It Took Everything	Metalcore	SharpTone	
February 7	The Lone Bellow	Half Moon Light		Dualtone	
February 7	Morgan James	Memphis Magnetic		Hedonist Records	
February 7	Nada Surf	Never Not Together		Barsuk	
February 7	Oh Wonder	No One Else Can Wear Your Crown		Island	
February 7	Prince Royce	Alter Ego		Sony Music Latin	
February 7	Richard Marx	Limitless	Pop rock, country	BMG	
February 7	Sepultura	Quadra	Thrash metal, groove metal	Nuclear Blast	
February 7	Shopping	All or Nothing	Dark wave, disco, dance-punk	FatCat	
February 7	Spanish Love Songs	Brave Faces Everyone	Pop punk	Pure Noise	
February 7	Stone Temple Pilots	Perdida	Soft rock, folk, alternative rock	Rhino	
February 7	Sylosis	Cycle of Suffering		Nuclear Blast	
February 7	Those Damn Crows	Point of No Return		Earache	
February 7	Trixie Mattel	Barbara	Surf rock	Producer Entertainment Group	
February 7	Various artists	Birds of Prey: The Album		Atlantic	
February 12	Amr Diab	Sahran		Nay for Media	
February 12	Kard	Red Moon		DSP Media	
February 12	Pentagon	Universe: The Black Hall	K-pop	Cube	
February 12	Scandal	Kiss from the Darkness		Victor Entertainment	
February 14	Anvil	Legal at Last	Heavy metal, speed metal	AFM	
February 14	Beach Bunny	Honeymoon	Indie pop	Mom + Pop	
February 14	A Boogie wit da Hoodie	Artist 2.0		Highbridge the Label, Atlantic	
February 14	Carly Pearce	Carly Pearce	Country	Big Machine	
February 14	Eden	No Future		MCMXCV, Astralwerks	
February 14	Hollywood Undead	New Empire, Vol. 1	Rap rock, nu metal, hard rock	Dove & Grenade Media, BMG	
February 14	Huey Lewis and the News	Weather	Rock	BMG	
February 14	Jack River	Stranger Heart		I Oh You, Universal Australia	
February 14	Justin Bieber	Changes	R&B	RBMG, Def Jam	
February 14	Katie Gately	Loom	Avant-pop, electronic	Houndstooth	
February 14	Kvelertak	Splid	Heavy metal, black 'n' roll	Rise	
February 14	The Men	Mercy		Sacred Bones	
February 14	Monsta X	All About Luv	Pop	Epic	
February 14	Nathaniel Rateliff	And It's Still Alright	Folk	Stax	
February 14	New Hope Club	New Hope Club		Hollywood, Virgin	
February 14	Post Animal	Forward Motion Godyssey	Progressive rock, psychedelic rock	Polyvinyl	
February 14	Puss n Boots	Sister			
February 14	Robinson	Watching You		Sony Australia, Ministry of Sound	
February 14	Suicide Silence	Become the Hunter	Deathcore	Nuclear Blast	
February 14	Tame Impala	The Slow Rush	Psychedelic pop, disco, progressive pop	Modular	
February 14	Tennis	Swimmer		Mutually Detrimental Label	
February 17	Iz*One	Bloom*Iz	K-pop	Off the Record, Stone Music	
February 18	Dreamcatcher	Dystopia: The Tree of Language	EDM, rock	Dreamcatcher	
February 20	Guided by Voices	Surrender Your Poppy Field	Indie rock, power pop	Guided by Voices Inc.	
February 21	Allie X	Cape God		Twin Music	
February 21	The Amity Affliction	Everyone Loves You... Once You Leave Them	Metalcore	Pure Noise	
February 21	Best Coast	Always Tomorrow		Concord	
February 21	BTS	Map of the Soul: 7	Pop, R&B, hip-hop	Big Hit	
February 21	Coin	Dreamland			
February 21	Greg Dulli	Random Desire		Royal Cream, BMG	
February 21	Grimes	Miss Anthropocene	Industrial, pop, electropop	4AD	
February 21	Katie Pruitt	Expectations	Country	Rounder	
February 21	King Krule	Man Alive!	Post-punk	True Panther, Matador	
February 21	Ozzy Osbourne	Ordinary Man	Heavy metal, hard rock	Epic	
February 21	Polaris	The Death of Me		Resist Records	
February 21	Rose Cousins	Bravado		Outside Music	
February 21	Royce da 5'9"	The Allegory	Hip-hop	eOne	
February 21	Sarah Harmer	Are You Gone		Arts & Crafts	
February 21	Spinning Coin	Hyacinth		Geographic Music	
February 21	The Word Alive	Monomania		Fearless	
February 24	Young Nudy	Anyways	Hip-hop	RCA	
February 26	Princess Nokia	Everything Is Beautiful	Hip-hop, alternative rock	Platoon	
February 27	Christine and the Queens	La vita nuova	Electropop	Because Music	
February 28	The Allman Brothers Band	Trouble No More: 50th Anniversary Collection	Southern rock	Mercury	
February 28	Arashi	Arashi Reborn Vol.1	J-pop	J Storm	
February 28	Beneath the Massacre	Fearmonger		Century Media	
February 28	Caribou	Suddenly	Pop, electronica	Merge, City Slang	
February 28	Five Finger Death Punch	F8	Groove metal, alternative metal, hard rock	Better Noise	
February 28	Four Year Strong	Brain Pain	Pop-punk, melodic hardcore	Pure Noise	
February 28	James Taylor	American Standard	Traditional pop	Fantasy	
February 28	Lil Baby	My Turn	Hip-hop	Quality Control	
February 28	Lisa Loeb	A Simple Trick to Happiness	Pop	Furious Rose	
February 28	Najwa	Viene de Largo			
February 28	Nova Twins	Who Are the Girls?		333 Wreckords Crew	
February 28	Ratboys	Printer's Devil		Topshelf	
February 28	Real Estate	The Main Thing	Indie rock	Domino	
February 28	The Secret Sisters	Saturn Return		New West	
February 28	Soccer Mommy	Color Theory		Loma Vista	
February 29	Bad Bunny	YHLQMDLG	Reggaeton	Rimas Entertainment	

=== March ===
List of albums released in March 2020
Go to: January | February | March | April | May | June | July | August | September | October | November | December | Back to top
Release date	Artist	Album	Genre	Label	Ref.
March 3	Jay Whiss	Peace of Mind	Canadian hip-hop	Universal	
March 6	Anna Calvi	Hunted		Domino	
March 6	Body Count	Carnivore	Rap metal, thrash metal, hardcore punk	Century Media	
March 6	Brandy Clark	Your Life Is a Record	Country	Warner	
March 6	Caroline Rose	Superstar		New West	
March 6	Cornershop	England Is a Garden		Ample Play Records	
March 6	Flora Cash	Baby, It's Okay			
March 6	Hot Mulligan	You'll Be Fine	Emo	No Sleep	
March 6	Jhené Aiko	Chilombo	Neo soul	ArtClub, ARTium, Def Jam	
March 6	Kenny Barron Dave Holland Trio	Without Deception	Jazz	Dare2 Records	
March 6	King Von	Levon James	Hip-hop	Only the Family, Empire	
March 6	Lauv	How I'm Feeling	Pop	AWAL	
March 6	Lil Uzi Vert	Eternal Atake	Hip-hop	Roc Nation	
March 6	Mandy Moore	Silver Landings		Verve Forecast	
March 6	Megan Thee Stallion	Suga	Hip-hop, R&B	1501 Certified, 300	
March 6	NCT 127	Neo Zone		SM, Capitol, Caroline	
March 6	Noel Gallagher's High Flying Birds	Blue Moon Rising		Sour Mash Records	
March 6	Paul Heaton and Jacqui Abbott	Manchester Calling	Pop, folk, ska, soul	Virgin EMI	
March 6	Phantogram	Ceremony		Republic	
March 6	R.A.P. Ferreira	Purple Moonlight Pages		Ruby Yacht	
March 6	Silverstein	A Beautiful Place to Drown	Post-hardcore, pop punk	UNFD	
March 6	Stephen Malkmus	Traditional Techniques	Folk rock, psychedelic rock	Matador, Domino	
March 6	U.S. Girls	Heavy Light		4AD	
March 6	Viagra Boys	Common Sense			
March 9	Itzy	It'z Me	K-pop	JYP	
March 11	Koda Kumi	re(Mix)	Drum and bass, dubstep, house	Rhythm Zone	
March 13	Adam Brand	Speed of Life	Country	ABC	
March 13	The Boomtown Rats	Citizens of Boomtown		BMG	
March 13	Caitlyn Smith	Supernova		Monument	
March 13	Circa Waves	Sad Happy		Prolifica Inc.	
March 13	CocoRosie	Put the Shine On		Marathon Artists	
March 13	Code Orange	Underneath	Metalcore, hardcore punk, industrial metal	Roadrunner	
March 13	Cody Carnes	Run to the Father	Worship, CCM	Sparrow	
March 13	David James	If I Were You	Country pop	MDM, Universal Music Canada	
March 13	Deap Lips	Deap Lips		Cooking Vinyl	
March 13	Dogleg	Melee	Emo	Triple Crown	
March 13	The Districts	You Know I'm Not Going Anywhere		Fat Possum	
March 13	Don Toliver	Heaven or Hell	Hip-hop, trap, R&B	Cactus Jack	
March 13	Four Tet	Sixteen Oceans		Text	
March 13	Francesca Michielin	Feat (stato di natura)		RCA	
March 13	The Garden	Kiss My Super Bowl Ring	Experimental rock	Epitaph	
March 13	Gotthard	#13		Nuclear Blast	
March 13	Grouplove	Healer		Atlantic, Canvasback Music	
March 13	Horse Lords	The Common Task	Experimental rock	Northern Spy	
March 13	Jay Electronica	A Written Testimony	Hip-hop	Roc Nation	
March 13	Joywave	Possession	Indie pop, electropop, funk	Cultco, Hollywood	
March 13	Natalia Lacunza	EP2			
March 13	Niall Horan	Heartbreak Weather	Pop	Capitol	
March 13	Porridge Radio	Every Bad		Secretly Canadian	
March 13	R.E. Seraphin	Tiny Shapes	Jangle pop, power pop, indie rock	Paisley Shirt Records	
March 13	The Shires	Good Years	Country	BMG	
March 13	Tainy	Neon16 Tape: The Kids That Grew up on Reggaeton	Reggaeton	NEON16	
March 13	Two Feet	Pink		Republic	
March 13	Wolf	Feeding the Machine	Heavy metal, power metal	Century Media	
March 16	Die Antwoord	House of Zef	Hip-hop, electronic	Zef	
March 19	J Balvin	Colores	Reggaeton	Universal Latin	
March 20	Adam Lambert	Velvet	Funk rock, disco, glam rock	Empire Distribution	
March 20	Baxter Dury	The Night Chancers		Le Label, Heavenly	
March 20	Conan Gray	Kid Krow	indie pop, indie rock	Republic	
March 20	Fleur East	Fearless		Platinum East	
March 20	Grateful Dead	June 1976	Rock	Rhino	
March 20	Gordon Lightfoot	Solo		Warner Music Canada	
March 20	Irreversible Entanglements	Who Sent You?	Free jazz, spoken word	Don Giovanni, International Anthem	
March 20	Kelsea Ballerini	Kelsea	Pop, country	Black River	
March 20	Låpsley	Through Water		XL	
March 20	Morrissey	I Am Not a Dog on a Chain		BMG	
March 20	Myrkur	Folkesange		Relapse	
March 20	Roger Eno and Brian Eno	Mixing Colours		Deutsche Grammophon	
March 20	Rustin Man	Clockdust		Domino	
March 20	Sarah Close	And Now, We're Shining	Pop	The Kodiak Club, LAB	
March 20	Tony Allen and Hugh Masekela	Rejoice	Jazz, Afrobeat	World Circuit	
March 20	Tower of Power	Step Up	Funk	Mack Avenue	
March 20	Triángulo de Amor Bizarro	Triángulo de Amor Bizarro		Mushroom Pillow	
March 20	Uru	Orion Blue		Sony Music Associated Records	
March 20	The Weeknd	After Hours	New wave, R&B, dream pop	XO, Republic	
March 20	Zebra Katz	Less Is Moor			
March 22	Childish Gambino	3.15.20		RCA	
March 24	Kang Daniel	Cyan	K-pop	Konnect	
March 24	Pabllo Vittar	111		Sony Music	
March 24	Sufjan Stevens and Lowell Brams	Aporia	New-age	Asthmatic Kitty	
March 26	Nine Inch Nails	Ghosts V: Together	Ambient	The Null Corporation	
March 26	Nine Inch Nails	Ghosts VI: Locusts		The Null Corporation	
March 27	5 Seconds of Summer	Calm		Interscope	
March 27	The Birthday Massacre	Diamonds		Metropolis	
March 27	Brian Fallon	Local Honey		Lesser Known Records	
March 27	Candlemass	The Pendulum		Napalm	
March 27	Cavetown	Sleepyhead		Sire	
March 27	The Chats	High Risk Behaviour	Punk rock	Bargain Bin Records	
March 27	Chicago Underground Quartet	Good Days	Free jazz	Astral Spirits	
March 27	Cláudia Pascoal	!		Universal Music Portugal	
March 27	Daniel Avery and Alessandro Cortini	Illusion of Time		Rough Trade	
March 27	Dua Lipa	Future Nostalgia	Disco, electropop, dance-pop	Warner	
March 27	Giveon	Take Time	R&B	Not So Fast Records, Epic	
March 27	Half Waif	The Caretaker		Anti-	
March 27	Hellripper	Coronach		Century Media	
March 27	Igorrr	Spirituality and Distortion		Metal Blade	
March 27	In This Moment	Mother	Alternative metal, gothic metal, industrial metal	Atlantic, Roadrunner	
March 27	Ingrid Andress	Lady Like	Country pop	Warner	
March 27	Jessie Reyez	Before Love Came to Kill Us		FMLY, Island	
March 27	Joyner Lucas	ADHD	Hip-hop	Twenty Nine Music Group	
March 27	Knxwledge	1988	Funk	Stones Throw	
March 27	Lilly Hiatt	Walking Proof		New West	
March 27	Little Dragon	New Me, Same Us		Ninja Tune	
March 27	Loud Luxury	Nights Like This		Armada	
March 27	Nicolas Jaar	Cenizas		Other People	
March 27	The Orb	Abolition of the Royal Familia	Ambient house	Cooking Vinyl	
March 27	PartyNextDoor	Partymobile		OVO Sound, Warner	
March 27	Pearl Jam	Gigaton	Experimental rock, grunge, post-punk	Monkeywrench, Republic	
March 27	San Cisco	Flaws		Island City Records	
March 27	San Fermin	The Cormorant II		Better Company, Sony Music	
March 27	Skepta, Chip and Young Adz	Insomnia	British hip-hop, trap	SKC M29	
March 27	Sorry	925		Domino	
March 27	Vanessa Carlton	Love Is an Art		Dine Alone	
March 27	Waxahatchee	Saint Cloud	Indie rock	Merge	
March 30	Cowboy Junkies	Ghosts		Latent	
March 30	Suho	Self-Portrait	K-pop, rock	SM	
March 31	Fisher	Freaks		Catch & Release	

== Second quarter ==
=== April ===
List of albums released in April 2020
Go to: January | February | March | April | May | June | July | August | September | October | November | December | Back to top
Release date	Artist	Album	Genre	Label	Ref.
April 1	Brymo	Yellow	Sentimental ballad, trap, sophisti-pop		
April 1	TOO	Reason for Being: Benevolence		n.CH, Stone Music	
April 2	Code Kunst	People	Hip-hop	AOMG	
April 2	Phish	Sigma Oasis	Progressive rock	JEMP	
April 2	Yaeji	What We Drew 우리가 그려왔던		XL	
April 3	All Time Low	Wake Up, Sunshine		Fueled by Ramen	
April 3	Ashley McBryde	Never Will	Country	Warner Music Nashville	
April 3	August Burns Red	Guardians	Metalcore	Fearless	
April 3	Conception	State of Deception	Progressive metal		
April 3	Cory Wong with Metropole Orkest	Live in Amsterdam		Cory Wong	
April 3	Empress Of	I'm Your Empress Of		Terrible, XL	
April 3	Everything Is Recorded	Friday Forever		XL	
April 3	Kerser	Roll the Dice		Warner Australia	
April 3	Kiana Ledé	Kiki	R&B	The Heavy Group, Republic	
April 3	M. Ward	Migration Stories		Anti-	
April 3	Mystery Jets	A Billion Heartbeats		Caroline	
April 3	Peach Pit	You and Your Friends			
April 3	Pigs Pigs Pigs Pigs Pigs Pigs Pigs	Viscerals	Stoner rock, doom metal	Rocket Recordings	
April 3	Pure Reason Revolution	Eupnea		Inside Out Music	
April 3	Purity Ring	Womb		4AD	
April 3	Red	Declaration		Red Entertainment, The Fuel Music	
April 3	Ren Harvieu	Revel in the Drama			
April 3	Rod Wave	Pray 4 Love	Hip-hop	Alamo Records	
April 3	Sam Hunt	Southside	Country	MCA Nashville	
April 3	Steve Aoki	Neon Future IV		Dim Mak	
April 3	Testament	Titans of Creation	Thrash metal	Nuclear Blast	
April 3	Thundercat	It Is What It Is		Brainfeeder	
April 3	Titãs	Titãs Trio Acústico EP 01		Sony BMG	
April 3	Tops	I Feel Alive		Arbutus	
April 3	Violent Soho	Everything Is A-OK		I Oh You	
April 3	Vlossom (Nick Littlemore and Alistair Wright)	My Friend		Lab78, Etcetc	
April 3	Wilma Archer	A Western Circular		Domino	
April 3	Yves Tumor	Heaven to a Tortured Mind	Experimental rock, psychedelic soul	Warp	
April 8	Anly	Sweet Cruisin'			
April 10	Benighted	Obscene Repressed			
April 10	Cadet	The Rated Legend	Afroswing	Underrated Legends	
April 10	DJ Python	Mas Amable		Incienso	
April 10	The Dream Syndicate	The Universe Inside		Anti-	
April 10	Hamilton Leithauser	The Loves of Your Life	Indie rock	Glassnote	
April 10	Joe Satriani	Shapeshifting	Instrumental rock, hard rock, blues rock	Sony Music	
April 10	Laura Marling	Song for Our Daughter		Chrysalis, Partisan	
April 10	Maddie & Tae	The Way It Feels	Country	Mercury Nashville	
April 10	Nightwish	Human. :II: Nature.	Symphonic metal	Nuclear Blast	
April 10	The Strokes	The New Abnormal	Indie rock, new wave, post-punk	Cult, RCA	
April 10	Tory Lanez	The New Toronto 3	Hip-hop	Interscope	
April 10	Wolfheart	Wolves of Karelia	Melodic death metal	Napalm	
April 13	Apink	Look	K-pop	Play M	
April 13	Black Dresses	Peaceful as Hell		Blacksquares Records	
April 16	Erodelia	Erodelia			
April 17	The Black Dahlia Murder	Verminous	Melodic death metal	Metal Blade	
April 17	DaBaby	Blame It on Baby	Hip-hop	Interscope	
April 17	Danzig	Danzig Sings Elvis	Rock	Cleopatra	
April 17	David Bromberg Band	Big Road	Americana	Red House	
April 17	Duke Dumont	Duality		Virgin EMI	
April 17	Dvsn	A Muse in Her Feelings		OVO Sound	
April 17	EOB	Earth		Capitol	
April 17	Enter Shikari	Nothing Is True & Everything Is Possible		SO Recordings	
April 17	Fiona Apple	Fetch the Bolt Cutters		Epic	
April 17	Gerry Cinnamon	The Bonny		Little Runaway Records	
April 17	Incubus	Trust Fall (Side B)		Island	
April 17	Infant Island	Sepulcher		Acrobat Unstable Records, Left Hand Label, Zegema Beach Records	
April 17	Jeremy Zucker	Love Is Not Dying		Republic	
April 17	Lido Pimienta	Miss Colombia	Latin pop, electronic	Anti-	
April 17	The Pack A.D.	It Was Fun While It Lasted			
April 17	R.A. the Rugged Man	All My Heroes Are Dead	Hip-hop	Nature Sounds	
April 17	Rina Sawayama	Sawayama		Dirty Hit	
April 17	Shabazz Palaces	The Don of Diamond Dreams		Sub Pop	
April 17	Soul Asylum	Hurry Up and Wait	Alternative rock	Blue Élan	
April 17	Tech N9ne	Enterfear	Hip-hop	Strange Music	
April 17	The Smith Street Band	Don't Waste Your Anger		Pool House Records	
April 17	Westside Gunn	Pray for Paris	Hip-hop	Griselda	
April 17	The White Buffalo	On the Widow's Walk	Americana	Snakefarm	
April 17	White Denim	World as a Waiting Room			
April 20	Liar, Flower (KatieJane Garside and Chris Whittingham)	Geiger Counter	Art rock, folk, freak folk	One Little Indian	
April 20	Moor Jewelry (Moor Mother and Mental Jewelry)	True Opera			
April 20	Smino	She Already Decided		Zero Fatigue	
April 22	April	Da Capo	Synth-pop, dance-pop	DSP	
April 22	mxmtoon	Dawn	Pop	AWAL	
April 22	X	Alphabetland	Punk rock	Fat Possum	
April 23	Asher Roth	Flowers on the Weekend	Hip-hop	RetroHash LLC	
April 23	Taylor Swift	Live from Clear Channel Stripped 2008	Country pop	Big Machine	
April 24	Alice Bag	Sister Dynamite		In the Red	
April 24	Alina Baraz	It Was Divine		Mom + Pop	
April 24	Awolnation	Angel Miners & the Lightning Riders	Alternative rock, electronic rock, pop	Better Noise	
April 24	Birds of Tokyo	Human Design		Eleven, EMI Australia	
April 24	Brendan Benson	Dear Life		Third Man	
April 24	Dance Gavin Dance	Afterburner	Post-hardcore, experimental rock	Rise	
April 24	Day Wave	Crush		PIAS	
April 24	Guapdad 4000	Platinum Falcon Tape, Vol. 1			
April 24	Jerry Garcia Band	Garcia Live Volume 13	Rock	ATO	
April 24	K Camp	Kiss Five	Hip-hop	Interscope	
April 24	Katatonia	City Burials	Progressive rock	Peaceville	
April 24	King Gizzard & the Lizard Wizard	Chunky Shrapnel		Flightless	
April 24	Lennon Stella	Three. Two. One.		Columbia	
April 24	Lil Gotit	Hood Baby 2	Trap	Alamo Records	
April 24	Lorenzo Senni	Scacco Matto		Warp	
April 24	Lucinda Williams	Good Souls Better Angels	Americana, heartland rock	Highway 20 Records, Thirty Tigers	
April 24	Quelle Chris and Chris Keys	Innocent Country 2	Alternative hip-hop	Mello Music	
April 24	Rone	Room with a View		InFiné	
April 24	Tom Misch and Yussef Dayes	What Kinda Music		Beyond the Groove, Blue Note, Caroline	
April 24	Trivium	What the Dead Men Say	Heavy metal, metalcore, thrash metal	Roadrunner	
April 24	The Used	Heartwork		Big Noise Music	
April 24	Whitney Rose	We Still Go to Rodeos		MCG Recordings	
April 27	Oh My Girl	Nonstop	K-pop	WM	
April 28	GWSN	The Keys	Dance-pop	Miles Entertainment	
April 28	Imfact	L.L		Star Empire	
April 29	The Oral Cigarettes	Suck My World		A-Sketch	

=== May ===
List of albums released in May 2020
Go to: January | February | March | April | May | June | July | August | September | October | November | December | Back to top
Release date	Artist	Album	Genre	Label	Ref.
May 1	American Aquarium	Lamentations		New West	
May 1	Austra	Hirudin	Electronic	Domino	
May 1	Boston Manor	Glue	Alternative rock	Pure Noise	
May 1	Caleb Landry Jones	The Mother Stone	Psychedelic rock	Sacred Bones	
May 1	Car Seat Headrest	Making a Door Less Open		Matador	
May 1	Courage My Love	Spectra			
May 1	Diet Cig	Do You Wonder About Me?		Frenchkiss	
May 1	Drake	Dark Lane Demo Tapes		OVO Sound, Republic	
May 1	Ghostpoet	I Grow Tired but Dare Not Fall Asleep	Art pop	PIAS	
May 1	Grateful Dead	Dave's Picks Volume 34	Rock	Rhino	
May 1	Hot Country Knights	The K Is Silent	Country, parody	Capitol Nashville	
May 1	JoJo	Good to Know	R&B	Clover Music, Warner	
May 1	Juan María Solare	Numbered Places		Bliss Recordings	
May 1	Ka	Descendants of Cain	Underground hip-hop, alternative hip-hop	Iron Works	
May 1	Kenny Chesney	Here and Now		Warner Music Nashville	
May 1	Maddy Jane	Not All Bad or Good		Lemon Tree Records, Sony Australia	
May 1	Mozzy	Beyond Bulletproof	Hip-hop	Mozzy Records, Epic	
May 1	The Wrecks	Infinitely Ordinary		Big Noise Music Group	
May 4	Astro	Gateway	K-pop	Fantagio	
May 4	Fanatics	Plus Two		FENT	
May 5	Chris Brown and Young Thug	Slime & B		CBE, RCA	
May 6	Can't Swim	When the Dust Settles		Pure Noise	
May 7	Cali y El Dandee	Colegio		Universal	
May 7	Camo & Krooked x Kolonovits & Orchestra	Red Bull Symphonic		Hospital	
May 8	Blake Mills	Mutable Set		Verve	
May 8	Hailee Steinfeld	Half Written Story	Pop	Republic	
May 8	Hayley Williams	Petals for Armor	Art pop, experimental pop, indie pop	Atlantic	
May 8	I Break Horses	Warnings		Bella Union	
May 8	Kehlani	It Was Good Until It Wasn't	R&B	Atlantic	
May 8	Lil Durk	Just Cause Y'all Waited 2	Hip-hop	Alamo Records, Geffen	
May 8	Mark Lanegan	Straight Songs of Sorrow	Rock	Heavenly	
May 8	Natalia Lafourcade	Un Canto por México, Vol. 1	Folk, bolero, son jarocho	Sony Music Mexico	
May 8	Nav	Good Intentions	Hip-hop, trap	XO, Republic	
May 8	Okkyung Lee	Yeo-Neun		Shelter Press	
May 10	Bad Bunny	Las que no iban a salir	Reggaeton, latin trap	Rimas Entertainment	
May 11	Day6	The Book of Us: The Demon	K-pop	JYP	
May 11	NU'EST	The Nocturne	K-pop	Pledis	
May 13	Bvndit	Carnival	K-pop	MNH	
May 13	Deante' Hitchcock	Better	Hip-hop	ByStorm Entertainment, RCA	
May 15	Alma	Have U Seen Her?		PME Records	
May 15	Ana Popović	Live for Live	Electric blues, funk	ArtisteXclusive Records	
May 15	Asking Alexandria	Like a House on Fire	Hard rock, pop rock, arena rock	Sumerian	
May 15	C. Tangana	Bien		Sony Music	
May 15	Charli XCX	How I'm Feeling Now	Electropop, experimental pop, hyperpop	Atlantic	
May 15	The Dears	Lovers Rock		Dangerbird	
May 15	Einstürzende Neubauten	Alles in Allem	Experimental, industrial	Potomak	
May 15	Emma Blackery	My Arms Are Open		RWG Records	
May 15	Firewind	Firewind	Hard rock, power metal	AFM	
May 15	Future	High Off Life		Freebandz, Epic	
May 15	Infant Island	Beneath	Screamo	Dog Knights Productions	
May 15	Jason Isbell	Reunions		Southeastern Records	
May 15	Jerry Paper	Abracadabra		Stones Throw	
May 15	Jess Williamson	Sorceress		Mexican Summer	
May 15	Jim White and Marisa Anderson	The Quickening	Experimental	Thrill Jockey	
May 15	JXN	Never a Sad Adventure		Warner Music Australia	
May 15	Kaitlyn Aurelia Smith	The Mosaic of Transformation		Ghostly International	
May 15	KennyHoopla	How Will I Rest in Peace if I'm Buried by a Highway?		Arista, Mogul Vision	
May 15	Louise Patricia Crane	Deep Blue	Progressive pop	Peculiar Doll Records	
May 15	Moby	All Visible Objects		Little Idiot Collective, Mute	
May 15	Moses Sumney	Græ		Jagjaguwar	
May 15	Noah Cyrus	The End of Everything		Records, Columbia	
May 15	Paradise Lost	Obsidian	Gothic metal, death-doom	Nuclear Blast	
May 15	Perfume Genius	Set My Heart on Fire Immediately		Matador	
May 15	Polo G	The Goat		Columbia	
May 15	Sara Evans	Copy That		Born to Fly Records	
May 15	Sleaford Mods	All That Glue		Rough Trade	
May 15	Sparks	A Steady Drip, Drip, Drip		BMG	
May 15	The Teskey Brothers	Live at the Forum		Ivy League	
May 15	Thao & the Get Down Stay Down	Temple	Alternative folk, experimental pop	Ribbon Music	
May 15	Tiësto	The London Sessions		Musical Freedom, PM:AM Recordings, Universal Music	
May 15	Travis Denning	Beer's Better Cold		Mercury Nashville	
May 15	Willie Nile	New York at Night	Pop rock	River House Records	
May 15	Woo!ah!	Exclamation			
May 15	Yung Lean	Starz	Cloud rap	YEAR0001	
May 18	TXT	The Dream Chapter: Eternity	Pop	Big Hit, Republic, Dreamus	
May 20	Crossfaith	Species	Metalcore, electronicore, electronica	UNFD	
May 20	Fujii Kaze	Help Ever Hurt Never		Universal Sigma	
May 20	Jeff Rosenstock	No Dream	Punk rock, power pop	Quote Unquote, Polyvinyl	
May 20	Ryu Su-jeong	Tiger Eyes		Woollim	
May 21	Carly Rae Jepsen	Dedicated Side B		604, School Boy, Interscope	
May 21	Sech	1 of 1	Reggaeton	Rich Music	
May 22	The 1975	Notes on a Conditional Form	Pop, rock	Dirty Hit, Polydor	
May 22	The Airborne Toxic Event	Hollywood Park		Rounder	
May 22	Agust D	D-2		Big Hit	
May 22	Craig Morgan	God, Family, Country			
May 22	Dej Loaf	It's a Set Up!		Yellow World, The Dispensary	
May 22	Gunna	Wunna		YSL, 300	
May 22	Key Glock	Son of a Gun		Paper Route Empire	
May 22	KSI	Dissimulation	British hip-hop	RBC, BMG	
May 22	Nation of Language	Introduction, Presence	Synth-pop, post-punk		
May 22	Owen Pallett	Island		Domino	
May 22	Party Dozen	Pray for Party Dozen		Grupo Records	
May 22	Steve Earle	Ghosts of West Virginia		New West	
May 22	Styles P	Styles David: Ghost Your Enthusiasm		The Phantom Entertainment, Empire	
May 22	Tim Burgess	I Love the New Sky		Bella Union	
May 22	Woods	Strange to Explain		Woodsist	
May 22	Young M.A	Red Flu		M.A Music	
May 26	Monsta X	Fantasia X	Hip-hop, EDM, R&B	Starship Entertainment	
May 27	Novelbright	Wonderland		Emperor Driver	
May 27	Vaundy	Strobo		SDR	
May 28	Backxwash	God Has Nothing to Do with This Leave Him Out of It	Horrorcore, trap metal, industrial hip-hop	Grimalkin	
May 29	Aitch	Polaris		Since 93	
May 29	Alec Benjamin	These Two Windows		Warner	
May 29	Alestorm	Curse of the Crystal Coconut		Napalm	
May 29	Alex Lahey	Between the Kitchen and the Living Room		Caroline Music Australia, Dead Oceans	
May 29	Anuel AA	Emmanuel	Latin trap, reggaeton	Real Hasta la Muerte, Inc.	
May 29	Blanche	Empire		PIAS	
May 29	Christian Lee Hutson	Beginners		Anti-	
May 29	Cory Wong and Jon Batiste	Meditations		Cory Wong, Jon Batiste	
May 29	Deerhoof	Future Teenage Cave Artists		Joyful Noise	
May 29	Diplo	Diplo Presents Thomas Wesley, Chapter 1: Snake Oil	Country pop, EDM, trap	Columbia	
May 29	Freddie Gibbs and The Alchemist	Alfredo	Hip-hop	ALC Records, Empire	
May 29	Jimmy Buffett	Life on the Flip Side	Soft rock	Mailboat	
May 29	Kip Moore	Wild World	Country	MCA Nashville	
May 29	Kygo	Golden Hour		Sony Music	
May 29	L.E.J	Pas peur		Mercury	
May 29	Lady Gaga	Chromatica		Interscope, Streamline Records	
May 29	Lil Yachty	Lil Boat 3		Quality Control, Capitol	
May 29	Loïc Nottet	Sillygomania		Sony Music	
May 29	Lucki	Almost There		Empire	
May 29	The Magnetic Fields	Quickies	Indie rock, indie pop	Nonesuch	
May 29	Mala Rodríguez	Mala		Universal	
May 29	Mrs. Piss	Self-Surgery		Sargent House	
May 29	Owl Eyes	Invisible Woman		Owl Eyes	
May 29	Palaye Royale	The Bastards		Sumerian	
May 29	Powfu	Poems of the Past		Columbia	
May 29	Ricky Martin	Pausa		Sony Music Latin	
May 29	Teddy Thompson	Heartbreaker Please	Americana	Thirty Tigers	
May 29	Vistas	Everything Changes in the End		Retrospect Records	

=== June ===
List of albums released in June 2020
Go to: January | February | March | April | May | June | July | August | September | October | November | December | Back to top
Release date	Artist	Album	Genre	Label	Ref.
June 1	Twice	More & More	K-pop, EDM, future house	JYP, Republic	
June 3	Mameshiba no Taigun	Start	J-pop	Tower Records	
June 3	Milet	Eyes		SME	
June 3	Run the Jewels	RTJ4	Hip-hop	Jewel Runners, BMG	
June 5	Ambrose Akinmusire	On the Tender Spot of Every Calloused Moment	Jazz, avant-garde	Blue Note	
June 5	Armand Hammer	Shrines	Underground hip-hop	Backwoodz Studioz	
June 5	Black Midi	The Black Midi Anthology Vol. 1: Tales of Suspense and Revenge	Experimental rock, post-rock, noise rock	Black Midi	
June 5	Blanco White	On the Other Side		Yucatán Records	
June 5	Bruno Major	To Let a Good Thing Die		AWAL	
June 5	Emilie Nicolas	Let Her Breathe		Mouchiouse Music	
June 5	Flatbush Zombies	Now, More Than Ever		The Glorious Dead	
June 5	Hinds	The Prettiest Curse	Garage rock	Mom + Pop, Lucky Number Music	
June 5	Janet Devlin	Confessional		Insomnia Music	
June 5	Leifur James	Angel in Disguise		Night Time Stories	
June 5	Matt Lang	More	Country	Jayward	
June 5	Mt. Joy	Rearrange Us		Dualtone	
June 5	Nick Lowe	Lay It on Me	Rock, Americana	Yep Roc	
June 5	Ohmme	Fantasize Your Ghost		Joyful Noise	
June 5	Rolling Blackouts Coastal Fever	Sideways to New Italy	Indie rock, jangle pop	Sub Pop	
June 5	Sarah Jarosz	World on the Ground	Folk, Americana	Rounder	
June 5	Sonic Boom	All Things Being Equal		Carpark	
June 5	Sports Team	Deep Down Happy		Island	
June 5	Westerman	Your Hero Is Not Dead	Experimental pop	Partisan, PIAS	
June 5	Wiley	The Godfather III		CTA Records	
June 9	Kiyoshi Hikawa	Papillon -Bohemian Rhapsody-		Columbia	
June 10	DIA	Flower 4 Seasons	K-pop	MBK	
June 10	Heize	Lyricist		Stone Music	
June 10	N.Flying	So, 通		FNC	
June 12	Brad Mehldau	Suite: April 2020	Jazz	Nonesuch	
June 12	Built to Spill	Built to Spill Plays the Songs of Daniel Johnston		Ernest Jenning	
June 12	Chloe x Halle	Ungodly Hour	R&B, pop, hip-hop soul	Parkwood, Columbia	
June 12	Gia Margaret	Mia Gargaret	Ambient	Dalliance Recordings, Orindal Records	
June 12	Gone West	Canyons		Triple Tigers	
June 12	Iann Dior	I'm Gone		Internet Money, Caroline	
June 12	Jack Garratt	Love, Death & Dancing	Pop	Island	
June 12	Jehnny Beth	To Love Is to Live	Alternative, industrial	Caroline	
June 12	John Scofield	Swallow Tales	Jazz	ECM	
June 12	Kate NV	Room for the Moon		RVNG Intl.	
June 12	Kodaline	One Day at a Time		AWAL, B-Unique	
June 12	Larkin Poe	Self Made Man		Tricki-Woo Records	
June 12	Liam Gallagher	MTV Unplugged (Live at Hull City Hall)		Warner	
June 12	The McClymonts	Mayhem to Madness	Country	Universal, Island Australia	
June 12	Norah Jones	Pick Me Up Off the Floor	Jazz pop, jazz folk	Blue Note	
June 12	Paul Kelly	Forty Days		Paul Kelly	
June 12	Spacey Jane	Sunlight		AWAL	
June 12	Vika and Linda	'Akilotoa		Bloodlines Music	
June 15	Iz*One	Oneiric Diary	K-pop	Off the Records, Swing	
June 17	D1ce	Draw You: Remember Me		D1CE Company	
June 17	Nature	Nature World: Code M		n.CH Entertainment	
June 17	Stray Kids	Go Live	K-pop	JYP	
June 18	Phantom Planet	Devastator		Gong Records	
June 18	Phoebe Bridgers	Punisher	Indie rock, indie folk	Dead Oceans	
June 18	Weki Meki	Hide and Seek	Dance-pop	Fantagio	
June 19	Amnesia Scanner	Tearless		PAN Records	
June 19	Baauer	Planet's Mad		LuckyMe	
June 19	Black Eyed Peas	Translation		Epic	
June 19	Bob Dylan	Rough and Rowdy Ways	Americana, American folk, blues	Columbia	
June 19	Carlos Sadness	Tropical Jesus	Tropical		
June 19	Clint Black	Out of Sane		Blacktop Records, Thirty Tigers	
June 19	Gabby Barrett	Goldmine	Country pop	Warner Music Nashville	
June 19	Jason Mraz	Look for the Good	Reggae	BMG	
June 19	John Legend	Bigger Love		Columbia	
June 19	Lamb of God	Lamb of God		Epic, Nuclear Blast	
June 19	Mushroomhead	A Wonderful Life		Napalm	
June 19	Neil Young	Homegrown	Country rock, folk rock	Reprise	
June 19	New Found Glory	Forever + Ever x Infinity		Hopeless	
June 19	Ocean Alley	Lonely Diamond		UNIFIED	
June 19	Oumou Sangaré	Acoustic		No Format!	
June 19	Protest the Hero	Palimpsest		Spinefarm	
June 19	Sault	Untitled (Black Is)	Soul, R&B, funk	Forever Living Originals	
June 19	Smokepurpp	Florida Jit		Alamo Records	
June 19	Tee Grizzley	The Smartest	Hip-hop	300	
June 19	Teyana Taylor	The Album	R&B	GOOD, Def Jam	
June 19	Trapt	Shadow Work	Post-grunge, alternative rock, pop rock	Crash Collide	
June 19	Txarango	De Vent i Ales		Halley Records	
June 19	Wale	The Imperfect Storm		Warner	
June 19	Yo-Yo Ma, Stuart Duncan, Edgar Meyer, Chris Thile	Not Our First Goat Rodeo	Bluegrass, classical	Sony Masterworks	
June 20	City Girls	City on Lock	Trap	Quality Control, Motown	
June 21	Mike	Weight of the World		10k Productions	
June 22	Seventeen	Heng:garæ		Pledis	
June 23	Hum	Inlet		Polyvinyl	
June 25	Nasty C and DJ Whoo Kid	Zulu		Def Jam	
June 26	6lack	6pc Hot EP		LoveRenaissance, Interscope	
June 26	Arca	Kick I		XL	
June 26	Buju Banton	Upside Down 2020	Reggae, dancehall	Gargamel Music, Roc Nation	
June 26	CeeLo Green	CeeLo Green Is Thomas Callaway	Soul	Easy Eye Sound, BMG	
June 26	Corb Lund	Agricultural Tragic		New West	
June 26	Daniel Avery	Love + Light		Phantasy	
June 26	G-Eazy	Everything's Strange Here		RCA	
June 26	Gordi	Our Two Skins		Jagjaguwar	
June 26	Grey Daze	Amends		Loma Vista	
June 26	Haim	Women in Music Pt. III	Pop rock	Columbia	
June 26	IDK	IDK & Friends 2		Clue No Clue	
June 26	Japandroids	Massey Fucking Hall		Anti-	
June 26	Jeff Ament	American Death Squad		Pearl Jam Ten Club	
June 26	Jessie Ware	What's Your Pleasure?	Disco, post-disco, funk	PMR, Friends Keep Secrets, Interscope	
June 26	Joe Lovano	Arctic Riff	Jazz	ECM	
June 26	Khruangbin	Mordechai		Dead Oceans	
June 26	Long Distance Calling	How Do We Want to Live?		Inside Out Music	
June 26	Louis the Child	Here for Now		Interscope	
June 26	Metrik	Ex Machina	Drum and bass	Hospital	
June 26	Nadine Shah	Kitchen Sink	Post-punk	Infectious	
June 26	Paysage d'Hiver	Im Wald			
June 26	Pottery	Welcome to Bobby's Motel		Partisan	
June 26	Raleigh Ritchie	Andy		Alacran Records	
June 26	Remo Drive	A Portrait of an Ugly Man		Epitaph	
June 26	Vanessa Amorosi	The Blacklisted Collection		Vanessa Amorosi	
June 28	Amee	Dreamee		St.319 Entertainment	
June 29	Hwasa	María	K-pop	RBW	

== Third quarter ==
=== July ===
List of albums released in July 2020
Go to: January | February | March | April | May | June | July | August | September | October | November | December | Back to top
Release date	Artist	Album	Genre	Label	Ref.
July 1	Piggs	Hallo Piggs		PourPourLand	
July 1	Verivery	Face You		Jellyfish	
July 1	Zico	Random Box		KOZ Entertainment	
July 2	The Rentals	Q36		The Rentals	
July 3	Animal Collective	Bridge to Quiet		Domino	
July 3	Boris	No	Hardcore punk, crust punk, metalcore	Fangs Anal Satan	
July 3	Bury Tomorrow	Cannibal	Metalcore	Music For Nations	
July 3	Cloud Nothings	The Black Hole Understands		Cloud Nothings	
July 3	Dream Wife	So When You Gonna...		Lucky Number Music	
July 3	Gucci Mane	So Icy Summer		Atlantic, GUWOP	
July 3	Honne	No Song Without You		Tatemae, Atlantic	
July 3	Keleketla! (Rangoatoo Hlasane, Malose Malahlela and Coldcut)	Keleketla!		Ahead of Our Time	
July 3	Paul Weller	On Sunset		Polydor	
July 3	Pop Smoke	Shoot for the Stars, Aim for the Moon	Drill, trap, R&B	Victor Victor, Republic	
July 3	Titãs	Titãs Trio Acústico EP 02		Sony BMG	
July 3	Westside Gunn	Flygod Is an Awesome God II		Griselda	
July 3	Willie Nelson	First Rose of Spring		Legacy	
July 6	Dalai Lama	Inner World	Spoken word, new-age, easy listening	Khandro Music	
July 8	Mrs. Green Apple	5		EMI	
July 8	SahBabii	Barnacles			
July 10	100 gecs	1000 Gecs and the Tree of Clues	Hyperpop	Dog Show Records	
July 10	The Beths	Jump Rope Gazers		Carpark, Rough Trade	
July 10	Brett Eldredge	Sunday Drive	Country	Warner Nashville	
July 10	The Buoys	All This Talking Gets Us No Where		Spunk Records	
July 10	Cory Wong	Trail Songs: Dusk			
July 10	DMA's	The Glow		I Oh You	
July 10	Ensiferum	Thalassic		Metal Blade	
July 10	Gillian Welch and David Rawlings	All the Good Times (Are Past & Gone)		Acony Records	
July 10	Hayden James	Hayden James Presents Waves of Gold (DJ Mix)		Future Classic	
July 10	Jimmie Allen	Bettie James		Stoney Creek, BMG	
July 10	Joshua Redman, Brad Mehldau, Christian McBride and Brian Blade	RoundAgain	Jazz	Nonesuch	
July 10	Juice Wrld	Legends Never Die	Hip-hop, emo rap	Grade A, Interscope	
July 10	Julianna Barwick	Healing Is a Miracle		Ninja Tune	
July 10	July Talk	Pray for It	Indie rock	Sleepless Records	
July 10	Kacy Hill	Is It Selfish If We Talk About Me Again		Kacy Hill Music	
July 10	Kamasi Washington, Robert Glasper, Terrace Martin and 9th Wonder	Dinner Party	Jazz, jazz rap, hip-hop	Sounds of Crenshaw	
July 10	Lime Cordiale	14 Steps to a Better You		Chugg Music Entertainment	
July 10	Margo Price	That's How Rumors Get Started	Americana, country rock	Loma Vista	
July 10	The Midnight	Monsters	Synthwave	Counter Records	
July 10	Mike Shinoda	Dropped Frames, Vol. 1		Kenji Kobayashi Productions	
July 10	My Morning Jacket	The Waterfall II	Psychedelic pop	ATO	
July 10	Nikki Yanofsky	Turn Down the Sound		eOne	
July 10	NZCA Lines	Pure Luxury		Memphis Industries	
July 10	Rufus Wainwright	Unfollow the Rules	Pop	BMG	
July 10	Soko	Feel Feelings		Because Music, Babycat Records	
July 10	Static-X	Project Regeneration Vol. 1	Industrial metal, nu metal	Otsego Entertainment Group	
July 10	Summer Walker	Life on Earth		LoveRenaissance, Interscope	
July 10	The Streets	None of Us Are Getting Out of This Life Alive		Island	
July 10	Z Berg	Get Z to a Nunnery		Metropolitan Indian Records	
July 13	GFriend	Song of the Sirens		Source, Kakao M	
July 14	BTS	Map of the Soul: 7 ~ The Journey ~	Pop	Def Jam, Virgin, Big Hit	
July 14	Gracie Abrams	Minor	Bedroom pop, electropop, indie folk	Interscope	
July 15	B.O.L.T	Pop		King	
July 17	The Aces	Under My Influence	Indie pop	Red Bull	
July 17	Alice Ivy	Don't Sleep		Dew Process	
July 17	Bladee	333	Cloud rap	Year0001	
July 17	Blu & Exile	Miles: From an Interlude Called Life	Hip-hop	Dirty Science Records	
July 17	Bush	The Kingdom	Alternative rock, grunge	BMG	
July 17	The Chicks	Gaslighter	Country	Columbia	
July 17	David Guetta and Morten	New Rave		Parlophone	
July 17	Ellie Goulding	Brightest Blue	Pop	Polydor	
July 17	Illuminati Hotties	Free I.H: This Is Not the One You've Been Waiting For		Tiny Engines	
July 17	Jarv Is	Beyond the Pale	Art rock, space rock, wonky pop	Rough Trade	
July 17	Joy Oladokun	In Defense of My Own Happiness (The Beginnings)	Pop	White Boy Records, Amigo Records, Verve Forecast	
July 17	Kansas	The Absence of Presence		Inside Out	
July 17	Kyle	See You When I Am Famous		Atlantic	
July 17	Laraaji	Sun Piano			
July 17	Lianne La Havas	Lianne La Havas		Warner	
July 17	Nicolas Jaar	Telas		Other People	
July 17	Oliver Tree	Ugly Is Beautiful		Atlantic	
July 17	The Pretenders	Hate for Sale		BMG	
July 17	Protomartyr	Ultimate Success Today		Domino	
July 17	Willaris. K	Full Noise		Astralwerks, Soothsayer Records	
July 17	Yo La Tengo	We Have Amnesia Sometimes	Drone, ambient	Matador	
July 21	Dehd	Flower of Devotion		Fire Talk	
July 22	Bish	Letters		Avex Trax	
July 22	Boldy James and Sterling Toles	Manger on McNichols	Jazz rap, experimental hip-hop, gangsta rap	Sector 7-G	
July 22	Go to the Beds	Go to the Beds		Fueled By Mentaiko	
July 24	Babes Wodumo	Idando Kazi		West Ink	
July 24	Broadside	Into the Raging Sea		SharpTone	
July 24	Burner Herzog	Big Love	Psychedelic pop, indie rock	Paisley Shirt Records	
July 24	Commander Cody and His Lost Planet Airmen	Bear's Sonic Journals: Found in the Ozone	Country rock	Owsley Stanley Foundation	
July 24	Courtney Marie Andrews	Old Flowers	Americana, folk, indie pop	Fat Possum	
July 24	Cub Sport	Like Nirvana	Indie pop	Cub Sport Records, Believe	
July 24	Currensy and Harry Fraud	The OutRunners		Jet Life	
July 24	Flo Milli	Ho, Why Is You Here?	Hip-hop	RCA	
July 24	Haken	Virus		Inside Out	
July 24	Jade Eagleson	Jade Eagleson	Country	Universal Music Canada	
July 24	Jerry Garcia and John Kahn	Garcia Live Volume 14	Americana	ATO	
July 24	Jessy Lanza	All the Time	Pop, electronic	Hyperdub	
July 24	Kamaal Williams	Wu Hen		Black Focus	
July 24	Katie Dey	Mydata		Run for Cover	
July 24	The Kid Laroi	F*ck Love	Emo rap, trap	Columbia	
July 24	Logic	No Pressure	Hip-hop	Visionary, Def Jam	
July 24	Lori McKenna	The Balladeer		CN Records	
July 24	Lupe Fiasco and Kaelin Ellis	House		1st and 15th Too Marketed	
July 24	The Naked and Famous	Recover		Somewhat Damaged Ltd	
July 24	Neck Deep	All Distortions Are Intentional	Pop punk	Hopeless	
July 24	Neon Trees	I Can Feel You Forgetting Me		Thrill Forever LLC	
July 24	Primal Fear	Metal Commando		Nuclear Blast	
July 24	Ronan Keating	Twenty Twenty		Decca, Universal	
July 24	Shirley Collins	Heart's Ease	Folk	Domino	
July 24	Taylor Swift	Folklore	Alternative	Republic	
July 28	Lana Del Rey	Violet Bent Backwards over the Grass	Spoken word	Polydor, Interscope	
July 28	Soulja Boy	King Soulja 9		Stacks on Deck Entertainment	
July 29	Daoko	Anima		Toy's Factory	
July 30	Jessi	Nuna	Hip-hop	P Nation, Kakao M	
July 31	Alain Johannes	Hum		Ipecac	
July 31	Alanis Morissette	Such Pretty Forks in the Road	Indie pop, chamber pop	Epiphany Music, Thirty Tigers	
July 31	Brandy	B7	R&B	Brand Nu Inc, Entertainment One	
July 31	Cory Asbury	To Love a Fool	Worship	Bethel Music	
July 31	Creeper	Sex, Death & the Infinite Void		Roadrunner	
July 31	Dizzy	The Sun and Her Scorch		Royal Mountain Records	
July 31	Dominic Fike	What Could Possibly Go Wrong	Hip-hop, rock, pop	Columbia	
July 31	E^ST	I'm Doing It		Warner Music Australia	
July 31	Fontaines D.C.	A Hero's Death	Post-punk, neo-psychedelia	Partisan, Rough Trade	
July 31	Grateful Dead	Dave's Picks Volume 35	Rock	Rhino	
July 31	Halsey	Collabs	Pop	Capitol	
July 31	Hockey Dad	Brain Candy		Farmer & The Owl	
July 31	Kota Banks	Sweet and the Spice		Sony Music Australia	
July 31	Liv.e	Couldn't Wait to Tell You	Psychedelic soul, R&B	In Real Life Music	
July 31	Max Richter	Voices		Decca	
July 31	Mike Shinoda	Dropped Frames, Vol. 2		Kenji Kobayashi Productions	
July 31	NOFX and Frank Turner	West Coast vs. Wessex	Punk rock, folk punk	Fat Wreck Chords	
July 31	Paul Kelly & Paul Grabowsky	Please Leave Your Light On		EMI Music Australia	
July 31	The Psychedelic Furs	Made of Rain		Cooking Vinyl	
July 31	Sebastian Maschat and Erlend Øye	Quarantine at El Ganzo		Bubbles Records	
July 31	Rival Consoles	Articulation		Erased Tapes	
July 31	Shoreline Mafia	Mafia Bidness	Hip-hop	Atlantic	
July 31	Trey Anastasio	Lonely Trip	Lo-fi	Rubber Jungle	
July 31	Wye Oak	No Horizon	Art pop	Merge	

=== August ===
List of albums released in August 2020
Go to: January | February | March | April | May | June | July | August | September | October | November | December | Back to top
Release date	Artist	Album	Genre	Label	Ref.
August 3	Kang Daniel	Magenta		Konnect, Sony Music	
August 3	(G)I-dle	Dumdi Dumdi		Cube	
August 3	Saturday	D.B.D.B.Dib		SD Entertainment	
August 4	Rocket Punch	Blue Punch	K-pop, EDM trap	Woollim	
August 7	Aminé	Limbo	Hip-hop	CLBN, Republic	
August 7	Another Sky	I Slept on the Floor		Fiction	
August 7	Avatar	Hunter Gatherer		eOne, Century Media	
August 7	Bronson	Bronson	House	Warner Music Australia, Ninja Tune, Foreign Family Collective	
August 7	Cory Marks	Who I Am	Country rock	Better Noise	
August 7	Cory Wong	Trail Songs: Dawn		Roundwound Media	
August 7	Death by Stereo	We're All Dying Just in Time		Indecision Records	
August 7	Deep Purple	Whoosh!		earMUSIC	
August 7	Eyedress	Let's Skip to the Wedding	Bedroom pop	Lex	
August 7	The Fall of Troy	Mukiltearth	Mathcore, post-hardcore, progressive rock	The Fall of Troy	
August 7	Felt	Felt 4 U	Hip-hop	Rhymesayers	
August 7	Glass Animals	Dreamland	Indie rock	Wolf Tone, Republic, Polydor	
August 7	Great Gable	Tracing Faces	Psychedelia	ADA Worldwide, Warner Music Australia	
August 7	In Hearts Wake	Kaliyuga	Metalcore, nu metal	UNFD, Rise	
August 7	Jason Molina	Eight Gates		Secretly Canadian	
August 7	Lil Keed	Trapped on Cleveland 3		YSL	
August 7	Luke Bryan	Born Here Live Here Die Here	Country	Capitol Nashville	
August 7	Melody Thornton	Lioness Eyes		Symphonic Distribution	
August 7	The Microphones	Microphones in 2020	Experimental rock	P. W. Elverum & Sun, Ltd.	
August 7	Onslaught	Generation Antichrist		AFM	
August 7	Shy Martin	Sad Songs		BLNK Music	
August 7	Sini Sabotage	Blueberry Makkonen			
August 7	Stand Atlantic	Pink Elephant		Hopeless	
August 7	Tkay Maidza	Last Year Was Weird (Vol. 2)		4AD	
August 7	Victoria Monét	Jaguar	R&B	Tribe Records	
August 7	Washed Out	Purple Noon	Chillwave	Sub Pop	
August 12	A. G. Cook	7G		PC Music	
August 12	My First Story	V		Intact Records	
August 13	Ho99o9	Blurr			
August 13	Lizzy McAlpine	Give Me a Minute	Indie folk, folk-pop	Harbour Artists & Music	
August 14	03 Greedo with RonRonTheProducer	Load It Up Vol 01		Alamo	
August 14	Biffy Clyro	A Celebration of Endings	Progressive rock	14th Floor, Warner	
August 14	Bill Frisell	Valentine	Jazz	Blue Note	
August 14	Black Marble	I Must Be Living Twice		Sacred Bones	
August 14	Bruce Hornsby	Non-Secure Connection		Zappo Productions	
August 14	Burna Boy	Twice as Tall	Afrobeats	Atlantic	
August 14	Busty and the Bass	Eddie	Electro, soul, hip-hop	Arts & Crafts	
August 14	Dave East	Karma 3	Hip-hop	Def Jam	
August 14	Emma Swift	Blonde on the Tracks	Alternative country	Tiny Ghost Records	
August 14	Fantastic Negrito	Have You Lost Your Mind Yet?	Blues	Cooking Vinyl, Blackball Universe	
August 14	Gloria Estefan	Brazil305	Samba	Crescent Moon	
August 14	Holly Humberstone	Falling Asleep at the Wheel	Pop-soul		
August 14	James Dean Bradfield	Even in Exile	Progressive rock	MontyRay	
August 14	Jacob Collier	Djesse Vol. 3			
August 14	Kaash Paige	Teenage Fever			
August 14	Kamelot	I Am the Empire – Live from the 013		Napalm	
August 14	Kane Brown	Mixtape, Vol. 1		Sony Nashville	
August 14	Kathleen Edwards	Total Freedom	Alternative country	Dualtone	
August 14	Kiesza	Crave		Island	
August 14	Lindsay Ell	Heart Theory		Stoney Creek	
August 14	Orville Peck	Show Pony	Country pop	Columbia, Sub Pop	
August 14	RaeLynn	Baytown		Round Here Records	
August 14	Sea Girls	Open Up Your Head	Indie rock, indie pop	Polydor	
August 14	Tech N9ne	More Fear			
August 14	Young Dolph	Rich Slave		Paper Route Empire	
August 21	Alex the Astronaut	The Theory of Absolutely Nothing		ADA, Nettwerk	
August 21	Blackbear	Everything Means Nothing		Beartrap, Alamo, Interscope	
August 21	Bright Eyes	Down in the Weeds, Where the World Once Was		Dead Oceans	
August 21	Bully	Sugaregg		Sub Pop	
August 21	Cut Copy	Freeze, Melt		Cutters Records, The Orchard	
August 21	Duckwrth	SuperGood		Republic	
August 21	Erasure	The Neon		Mute	
August 21	The Front Bottoms	In Sickness & In Flames		Fueled by Ramen	
August 21	Hope Darst	Peace Be Still	Contemporary worship music	Fair Trade Services	
August 21	The Killers	Imploding the Mirage		Island, EMI	
August 21	Lecrae	Restoration	Christian hip-hop	Reach	
August 21	The Lemon Twigs	Songs for the General Public	Glam rock		
August 21	Maluma	Papi Juancho		Sony Music Latin	
August 21	Matmos	The Consuming Flame		Thrill Jockey	
August 21	Maya Hawke	Blush	Folk rock	Mom + Pop	
August 21	Nas	King's Disease	East Coast hip-hop, R&B, trap	Mass Appeal	
August 21	Nubya Garcia	Source	Jazz	Concord Jazz	
August 21	Seeming	The Birdwatcher's Guide to Atrocity		Artoffact	
August 21	ShitKid	20/20 ShitKid		PNKSLM Recordings	
August 21	Tim McGraw	Here on Earth	Country	Big Machine Records	
August 21	Troye Sivan	In a Dream		Capitol	
August 21	Wafia	Good Things		Atlantic	
August 21	The Waterboys	Good Luck, Seeker		Cooking Vinyl	
August 22	Jefferson Starship	Mother of the Sun		Golden Robot	
August 26	Haley Blais	Below the Salt	Indie pop	Tiny Kingdom Music	
August 28	Agoney	Libertad		Universal	
August 28	The Allman Betts Band	Bless Your Heart	Southern rock	BMG	
August 28	Aluna	Renaissance		Mad Decent	
August 28	Angel Olsen	Whole New Mess		Jagjaguwar	
August 28	Bobby Rush	Rawer than Raw	Blues	Deep Rush	
August 28	Brandon Lake	House of Miracles	Contemporary worship	Bethel Music	
August 28	Cazzu	Una Niña Inútil			
August 28	Colter Wall	Western Swing & Waltzes and Other Punchy Songs	Country, Western	La Honda Records, Thirty Tigers	
August 28	Dallas Smith	Timeless		604	
August 28	Diesel	Sunset Suburbia		Bloodlines Records	
August 28	Disclosure	Energy	House	Island	
August 28	Dua Lipa	Club Future Nostalgia	House, pop, soul	Warner	
August 28	From Ashes to New	Panic		Better Noise	
August 28	Gregory Porter	All Rise	Jazz, soul, gospel	Blue Note, Decca	
August 28	Halsey	Badlands (Live from Webster Hall)		Capitol	
August 28	Internet Money	B4 the Storm	Hip-hop	Internet Money	
August 28	Jaden	CTV3: Cool Tape Vol. 3		MSFTSMusic, Roc Nation	
August 28	JessB	3 Nights in Amsterdam		The Orchard	
August 28	John Petrucci	Terminal Velocity	Instrumental rock, progressive rock, progressive metal	RenSam Songs, Sound Mind Music, The Orchard, Napalm Records	
August 28	Jyoti	Mama, You Can Bet!	Jazz	SomeOthaShip Connect	
August 28	Katy Perry	Smile	Pop	Capitol	
August 28	Kelly Lee Owens	Inner Song		Smalltown Supersound	
August 28	Needtobreathe	Out of Body	Alternative rock, Christian rock, Southern rock	Elektra	
August 28	Lovelytheband	Conversations with Myself About You			
August 28	The Lox	Living Off Xperience	Hip-hop	D-Block Records, Roc Nation	
August 28	Metallica with the San Francisco Symphony	S&M2	Symphonic metal	Blackened Recordings	
August 28	Nasty C	Zulu Man with Some Power		Def Jam	
August 28	Pig Destroyer	The Octagonal Stairway		Relapse	
August 28	Powerman 5000	The Noble Rot	Industrial metal	Cleopatra	
August 28	Pvris	Use Me		Warner	
August 28	Rome	The Lone Furrow		Trisol	
August 28	Ruston Kelly	Shape & Destroy		Rounder	
August 28	Sam Fischer	Homework		RCA	
August 28	The Score	Carry On		Republic	
August 28	Seether	Si Vis Pacem, Para Bellum		Fantasy	
August 28	Seth MacFarlane	Great Songs from Stage & Screen	Traditional pop, swing, easy listening	Republic, Verve, Fuzzy Door	
August 28	Sevdaliza	Shabrang		Twisted Elegance	
August 28	Skip Marley	Higher Place		Tuff Gong, Island	
August 28	Tim Bowness	Late Night Laments		Inside Out	
August 28	Toni Braxton	Spell My Name	R&B	Island	
August 28	Toots and the Maytals	Got to Be Tough	Reggae, rocksteady, ska	Trojan Jamaica, BMG	
August 28	Ulver	Flowers of Evil	Synth-pop, art rock	House of Mythology	
August 28	Wifisfuneral	Pain?		Alamo	
August 28	Zella Day	Where Does the Devil Hide	Indie pop, soft rock, funk	Concord	

=== September ===
List of albums released in September 2020
Go to: January | February | March | April | May | June | July | August | September | October | November | December | Back to top
Release date	Artist	Album	Genre	Label	Ref.
September 1	Lovelyz	Unforgettable		Woollim	
September 2	A.C.E	HZJM: The Butterfly Phantasy		Beat Interactive	
September 2	Silent Siren	Mix10th		Universal Music Japan	
September 3	Muzz	The Promised Land	Drum and bass	Monstercat	
September 4	6ix9ine	TattleTales	Hip-hop, trap	Create Music	
September 4	All Them Witches	Nothing as the Ideal	Stoner rock, neo-psychedelia	New West	
September 4	Big Sean	Detroit 2	Hip-hop	GOOD, Def Jam	
September 4	Bill Callahan	Gold Record		Drag City	
September 4	Billy Ocean	One World		Sony Music	
September 4	Boy & Bear	At Golden Retriever Studio		Boy & Bear, Island	
September 4	Code Orange	Under the Skin	Acoustic, grunge, electronic	Roadrunner	
September 4	Cory Wong	The Syncopate & Motivate Tour (Set 1)[Live]		Cory Wong	
September 4	Declan McKenna	Zeros		Columbia	
September 4	Grant-Lee Phillips	Lightning, Show Us Your Stuff		Yep Roc	
September 4	Hannah Grace	Remedy		Never Fade	
September 4	Hardy	A Rock	Country rock	Big Loud	
September 4	Hurts	Faith		Lento Records	
September 4	India Ramey	Shallow Graves		India Ramey	
September 4	JK-47	Made for This		JK-47, New World Artists	
September 4	Ozuna	Enoc		Aura Music	
September 4	The Pineapple Thief	Versions of the Truth	Alternative rock, progressive rock	Kscope	
September 4	San Cisco	Between You and Me		Island City Records	
September 4	Scott Helman	Nonsuch Park (SA)		Warner Music Canada	
September 4	Throwing Muses	Sun Racket	Alternative rock	Fire	
September 4	Tricky	Fall to Pieces		False Idols	
September 4	Wonho	Love Synonym Pt.1: Right for Me	K-pop	Highline	
September 4	Yelle	L'Ère du Verseau	Electropop	Recreation Center	
September 4	Yello	Point	EDM	UMG	
September 7	Lee Tae-min	Never Gonna Dance Again: Act 1		SM	
September 7	YooA	Bon Voyage		WM	
September 7	Jang Woo-hyuk	He (Don't Wanna Be Alone)			
September 9	Aimyon	Heard That There's Good Pasta	J-pop, pop rock	Unborde	
September 10	Niki	Moonchild	Alternative R&B, electropop	88rising, 12 Tone Music	
September 11	Conway the Machine	From King to a God		Griselda	
September 11	Cory Wong	The Syncopate & Motivate Tour (Set 2) [Live]		Cory Wong	
September 11	Doves	The Universal Want		Virgin, EMI	
September 11	Everything Everything	Re-Animator	Art pop	AWAL	
September 11	The Flaming Lips	American Head	Psychedelic rock	Warner, Bella Union	
September 11	Kelsea Ballerini	Ballerini	Country	Black River	
September 11	Marilyn Manson	We Are Chaos	Post-punk, gothic rock, industrial rock	Loma Vista	
September 11	Mickey Guyton	Bridges	Country	Capitol Nashville	
September 11	Neal Morse	Sola Gratia	Progressive rock	Inside Out	
September 11	Suzanne Vega	An Evening of New York Songs and Stories	Folk rock, acoustic rock	Cooking Vinyl, Amanuensis Productions	
September 11	Vika and Linda	Sunday (The Gospel According to Iso)	Gospel	Bloodlines Music	
September 11	YoungBoy Never Broke Again	Top	Hip-hop	Atlantic, Never Broke Again	
September 14	Tom Aspaul	Black Country Disco	Pop, disco	Tom Aspaul	
September 14	Vision Eternel	For Farewell of Nostalgia	Ambient, ethereal, post-rock	Somewherecold, Geertruida, Abridged Pause Recordings	
September 16	Fromis 9	My Little Society		Off The Record Entertainment, Stone Music	
September 18	10 Years	Violent Allies		Mascot	
September 18	A. G. Cook	Apple		PC Music	
September 18	Alicia Keys	Alicia	R&B, soul, chamber pop	RCA	
September 18	Anjimile	Giver Taker	Country, indie folk, folk	Father/Daughter	
September 18	Ava Max	Heaven & Hell	Pop	Atlantic	
September 18	Cults	Host		Sinderlyn	
September 18	Currensy and Harry Fraud	The Director's Cut		Jet Life, SRFSCHL	
September 18	Dee-1 and Murs	He's the Christian, I'm the Rapper		Mission Vision Music, Murs 316	
September 18	Elderbrook	Why Do We Shake in the Cold?		Parlophone	
September 18	Eric Johanson	Below Sea Level	Blues, Southern rock	Nola Blue Records	
September 18	Fit for a King	The Path	Metalcore	Solid State	
September 18	Gus Dapperton	Orca		AWAL	
September 18	Into It. Over It.	Figure		Triple Crown	
September 18	Jess Kent	Parking Karma		Ourness	
September 18	Joan Osborne	Trouble and Strife	Rock, soul	Thirty Tigers, Womanly Hips	
September 18	Kamaiyah and Capolow	Oakland Nights		GRND.WRK	
September 18	Keith Urban	The Speed of Now Part 1		Capitol Nashville	
September 18	Knuckle Puck	20/20		Rise	
September 18	Krizz Kaliko	Legend		Strange Music	
September 18	La Oreja de Van Gogh	Un susurro en la tormenta		Sony Music	
September 18	Lil Tecca	Virgo World		Galactic, Republic	
September 18	Matt Berry	Phantom Birds		Acid Jazz	
September 18	Max	Colour Vision	Pop	Colour Vision Records, RED Music	
September 18	Mike Shinoda	Dropped Frames, Vol. 3		Kenji Kobayashi Productions	
September 18	Moneybagg Yo and Blac Youngsta	Code Red		N-Less, Interscope, Epic	
September 18	Movements	No Good Left to Give		Fearless	
September 18	Napalm Death	Throes of Joy in the Jaws of Defeatism		Century Media	
September 18	Okkervil River	A Dream in the Dark: Two Decades of Okkervil River Live		ATO	
September 18	Osees	Protean Threat		Castle Face	
September 18	Sault	Untitled (Rise)	R&B	Forever Living Originals	
September 18	Semisonic	You're Not Alone	Alternative rock	Pleasuresonic Recordings	
September 18	Yours Truly	Self Care	Pop-punk	UNFD	
September 18	Yusuf/Cat Stevens	Tea for the Tillerman 2		Cat-O-Log Records, Decca	
September 21	Everglow	-77.82X-78.29	K-pop	Yuehua	
September 22	Fleet Foxes	Shore	Indie folk, chamber pop	Anti-	
September 23	Armored Saint	Punching the Sky	Heavy metal	Metal Blade	
September 23	Ghost9	Pre Episode 1: Door		Maroo	
September 23	Hinatazaka46	Hinatazaka		Sony Music	
September 24	Oklou	Galore		TaP Records	
September 24	Up10tion	Light Up	K-pop, EDM	TOP Media	
September 25	Action Bronson	Only for Dolphins	Alternative hip-hop	Loma Vista, Concord	
September 25	Alpha Wolf	A Quiet Place to Die	Metalcore, nu metal	Greyscale Records, SharpTone	
September 25	Anna von Hausswolff	All Thoughts Fly		Southern Lord	
September 25	ASAP Ferg	Floor Seats II		A$AP Worldwide, Polo Grounds Music, RCA	
September 25	Ayreon	Transitus		Music Theories Recordings	
September 25	Blitzen Trapper	Holy Smokes Future Jokes	Folk rock	Yep Roc	
September 25	Bob Mould	Blue Hearts	Alternative rock	Merge	
September 25	Carrie Underwood	My Gift	Christmas	Capitol Nashville	
September 25	Christian McBride	For Jimmy, Wes and Oliver	Jazz	Mack Avenue	
September 25	Deftones	Ohms	Alternative metal, shoegaze	Reprise	
September 25	Diana Krall	This Dream of You	Jazz	Verve	
September 25	Granger Smith	Country Things	Country	Wheelhouse	
September 25	Hen Ogledd	Free Humans	Experimental, alternative rock	Domino	
September 25	Idles	Ultra Mono	Post-punk, punk rock, industrial rock	Partisan	
September 25	Joji	Nectar	R&B	88rising	
September 25	Lydia Loveless	Daughter	Country	Honey, You're Gonna Be Late Records	
September 25	Machine Gun Kelly	Tickets to My Downfall	Pop punk	Bad Boy, Interscope	
September 25	Marie Davidson & L'Œil Nu	Renegade Breakdown		Ninja Tune	
September 25	Matt Mays	Dog City	Rock	Sonic Records	
September 25	Melanie Martinez	After School		Atlantic	
September 25	Moor Mother	Circuit City	Free jazz, spoken word	Don Giovanni	
September 25	The Neighbourhood	Chip Chrome & the Mono-Tones		Columbia	
September 25	The Ocean	Phanerozoic II: Mesozoic / Cenozoic	Post-metal, sludge metal, progressive metal	Metal Blade	
September 25	Public Enemy	What You Gonna Do When the Grid Goes Down?		Def Jam	
September 25	Spillage Village, JID & EarthGang	Spilligion	Hip-hop	Dreamville, Interscope, Sincethe80s	
September 25	Sufjan Stevens	The Ascension	Electropop	Asthmatic Kitty	
September 25	SuperM	Super One	K-pop	SM	
September 25	Svalbard	When I Die, Will I Get Better?	Post-hardcore, post-metal	Church Road	
September 25	Sylvan Esso	Free Love		Loma Vista	
September 25	Thurston Moore	By the Fire	Alternative rock	Daydream Library Series	
September 25	Tim Heidecker	Fear of Death	Pop rock	Spacebomb	
September 25	Titãs	Titãs Trio Acústico EP 03		Sony BMG	
September 25	Tory Lanez	Daystar	Hip-hop, R&B	One Umbrella	
September 25	Will Butler	Generations		Merge	
September 30	Neil Cicierega	Mouth Dreams	Mashup		

== Fourth quarter ==
=== October ===
List of albums released in October 2020
Go to: January | February | March | April | May | June | July | August | September | October | November | December | Back to top
Release date	Artist	Album	Genre	Label	Ref.
October 1	Laura Jane Grace	Stay Alive	Folk punk, power pop	Polyvinyl	
October 1	mxmtoon	Dusk	Folk-pop	AWAL	
October 2	21 Savage and Metro Boomin	Savage Mode II		Slaughter Gang, Boominati, Epic	
October 2	Aloe Blacc	All Love Everything		BMG	
October 2	Blackpink	The Album	Pop, R&B, hip-hop	YG, Interscope	
October 2	Bon Jovi	2020		Island	
October 2	Bryson Tiller	Anniversary		RCA	
October 2	Carys	To Anyone Like Me		Warner Canada	
October 2	Corey Taylor	CMFT	Hard rock	Roadrunner	
October 2	Cosmo's Midnight	Yesteryear		Sony Australia	
October 2	Dawes	Good Luck with Whatever		Rounder	
October 2	DevilDriver	Dealing with Demons I	Groove metal	Napalm	
October 2	Dolly Parton	A Holly Dolly Christmas	Christmas	Butterfly Records, 12Tone Music Group	
October 2	Drive-By Truckers	The New Ok	Country rock, alternative rock, alternative country	ATO	
October 2	Eartheater	Phoenix: Flames Are Dew Upon My Skin	Experimental, electronica	PAN	
October 2	Enslaved	Utgard	Progressive black metal	Nuclear Blast	
October 2	Frankie and the Witch Fingers	Monsters Eating People Eating Monsters...		Greenway Records	
October 2	Gabriel Garzón-Montano	Agüita	R&B, urbano	Jagjaguwar	
October 2	Giveon	When It's All Said and Done	R&B	Epic	
October 2	Groove Armada	Edge of the Horizon	Yacht rock	BMG	
October 2	The Hunna	I'd Rather Die Than Let You In		300 Entertainment	
October 2	The Jaded Hearts Club	You've Always Been Here		Helium 3, BMG, Infectious Music	
October 2	Jónsi	Shiver		Krunk	
October 2	Josh Baldwin	Evidence	Contemporary worship music	Bethel Music	
October 2	LANY	Mama's Boy		Polydor	
October 2	Mariah Carey	The Rarities	R&B	Columbia, Legacy	
October 2	Melanie C	Melanie C	Electronic, pop	Red Girl Media	
October 2	Mike Dillon	Shoot the Moon		Royal Potato Family	
October 2	Nathy Peluso	Calambre	Latin hip-hop	Sony Music	
October 2	Queen + Adam Lambert	Live Around the World		EMI	
October 2	Riley	Riley			
October 2	Róisín Murphy	Róisín Machine		Skint, BMG	
October 2	Shamir	Shamir	Indie rock		
October 2	Smoke DZA	Homegrown		RFC Music, Cinematic	
October 2	Westside Gunn	Who Made the Sunshine	Hip-hop	Griselda, Shady	
October 2	William Shatner	The Blues		Cleopatra	
October 2	YG	My Life 4Hunnid	Hip-hop	4Hunnid Records, Def Jam	
October 3	The Alchemist	A Doctor, a Painter & an Alchemist Walk into a Bar			
October 5	Jay Electronica	Act II: The Patents of Nobility (The Turn)	Hip-hop	Roc Nation, Equity	
October 5	WEi	Identity: First Sight		Oui, Kakao M	
October 8	Weki Meki	New Rules	K-pop, hip-hop, R&B	Fantagio Music	
October 9	Bahamas	Sad Hunk	Folk rock	Brushfire	
October 9	BlocBoy JB	FatBoy		Bloc Nation	
October 9	Blue Öyster Cult	The Symbol Remains	Hard rock, heavy metal	Frontiers	
October 9	Brothers Osborne	Skeletons		EMI Nashville	
October 9	Cepeda	Con Los Pies en el Suelo		Universal	
October 9	Dawn	Dawndididawn		P-Nation	
October 9	Future Islands	As Long as You Are	Synth-pop	4AD	
October 9	Headie One	Edna	British hip-hop, UK drill	Relentless	
October 9	Kiiara	Lil Kiiwi	Electropop	Atlantic	
October 9	Laraaji	Moon Piano			
October 9	Machinedrum	A View of U		Ninja Tune	
October 9	Mary Lattimore	Silver Ladders		Ghostly	
October 9	Mat Zo	Illusion of Depth		Anjunabeats	
October 9	Metz	Atlas Vending		Sub Pop	
October 9	Necrophobic	Dawn of the Damned	Blackened death metal	Century Media, Napalm	
October 9	Reason	New Beginnings	Hip-hop	Top Dawg	
October 9	Slow Pulp	Moveys	Bubblegrunge	Winspear	
October 9	Sub Focus and Wilkinson	Portals	Drum and bass	Virgin EMI	
October 9	Sun Ra Arkestra	Swirling		Strut	
October 9	Touché Amoré	Lament	Post-hardcore, melodic hardcore, screamo	Epitaph	
October 9	Travis	10 Songs		BMG	
October 9	Trey Songz	Back Home	R&B, soul	Atlantic	
October 12	NCT	NCT 2020 Resonance Pt. 1		SM	
October 12	Pentagon	We:th		Cube	
October 14	James Blake	Before	Dance	Republic, Polydor	
October 16	The Allman Brothers Band	The Final Note	Southern rock	Allman Brothers Band Recording Company	
October 16	The Allman Brothers Band	Warner Theatre, Erie, PA 7-19-05	Blues rock	Peach Records	
October 16	Annie	Dark Hearts		Annie Melody	
October 16	Astrid S	Leave It Beautiful	Electropop, synth-pop	Universal	
October 16	Beabadoobee	Fake It Flowers	Alternative rock, indie rock	Dirty Hit	
October 16	Benny the Butcher	Burden of Proof		Griselda	
October 16	Black Thought	Streams of Thought, Vol. 3: Cane & Able		Republic	
October 16	Blackswan	Goodbye Rania	K-pop	DR Music	
October 16	Cxloe	Heavy, Part. 1		Sandlot, AWAL	
October 16	The Damned	The Rockfield Files	Rock, gothic rock, psychedelic rock	Search And Destroy, Spinefarm	
October 16	Dorian Electra	My Agenda		Dorian Electra	
October 16	Gucci Mane and the New 1017	So Icy Gang, Vol. 1		1017, Atlantic	
October 16	Guy Sebastian	T.R.U.T.H.		Sony Music Australia	
October 16	Hawkwind Light Orchestra	Carnivorous	Progressive rock, progressive pop	Cherry Red	
October 16	Helena Deland	Someone New		Chivi Chivi, Luminelle Recordings	
October 16	Homeboy Sandman	Don't Feed the Monster	Hip-hop	MMG	
October 16	Katie Melua	Album No. 8		BMG	
October 16	Kevin Morby	Sundowner		Dead Oceans	
October 16	Lous and the Yakuza	Gore		Columbia	
October 16	Mario	Closer to Mars	R&B	New Citizen LLC	
October 16	Matt Berninger	Serpentine Prison		Book Records	
October 16	Mayday Parade	Out of Here	Emo	Rise	
October 16	Midwxst	Secrets			
October 16	Nena	Licht		Laugh + Peas	
October 16	Ninja Sex Party	The Prophecy			
October 16	Omar Apollo	Apolonio		Warner	
October 16	Open Mike Eagle	Anime, Trauma and Divorce	Alternative hip-hop	Auto Reverse Records	
October 16	PartyNextDoor	Partypack		OVO, Warner	
October 16	Pluralone	I Don't Feel Well		ORG Music	
October 16	The Reklaws	Sophomore Slump		Universal Music Canada	
October 16	Sasha Sloan	Only Child		RCA	
October 16	The Struts	Strange Days		Interscope	
October 16	Sturgill Simpson	Cuttin' Grass, Vol. 1: The Butcher Shoppe Sessions	Bluegrass	High Top Mountain Records	
October 16	T.I.	The L.I.B.R.A.	Hip-hop, trap	Grand Hustle, Empire	
October 16	Tommy Lee	Andro	Hip-hop	Better Noise	
October 16	The Vamps	Cherry Blossom		Virgin EMI	
October 16	Woodkid	S16		Green United Music	
October 19	Loona	12:00		Blockberry Creative	
October 19	B1A4	Origine		WM	
October 19	Im Chang-jung	Love Should Not Be Harsh on You			
October 19	Seventeen	Semicolon		Pledis	
October 20	Poppy	Music to Scream To	Noise, ambient	Sumerian	
October 21	Sakura Fujiwara	Supermarket		Speedstar Records	
October 23	Actress	Karma & Desire	Electronic	Ninja Tune	
October 23	Adrianne Lenker	Songs and Instrumentals	Acoustic, sound collage, folk	4AD	
October 23	Ashton Irwin	Superbloom			
October 23	Ball Park Music	Ball Park Music		Prawn Records, Inertia Music	
October 23	Blue October	This Is What I Live For		Up/Down-Brando Records	
October 23	Boy Pablo	Wachito Rico		777 Music	
October 23	Bruce Springsteen	Letter to You		Columbia	
October 23	Clipping	Visions of Bodies Being Burned	Experimental hip-hop, industrial hip-hop, horrorcore	Sub Pop	
October 23	Cory Wong	The Stripped Album		Roundwound Media	
October 23	Ela Minus	Acts of Rebellion		Domino	
October 23	Faithless	All Blessed		PIAS, Ultra	
October 23	Fuzz	III	Heavy metal, hard rock	In the Red	
October 23	Gorillaz	Song Machine, Season One: Strange Timez		Gorillaz Productions, Parlophone, Warner	
October 23	Hands Like Houses	Hands Like Houses		UNFD	
October 23	I Dont Know How but They Found Me	Razzmatazz		Fearless	
October 23	Jean Dawson	Pixel Bath	Alternative hip-hop, dream pop	P+	
October 23	Jeff Tweedy	Love Is the King	Indie rock	dBpm	
October 23	John Frusciante	Maya		Timesig	
October 23	Junglepussy	JP4		Jagjaguwar	
October 23	Loma	Don’t Shy Away		Sub Pop	
October 23	Major Lazer	Music Is the Weapon		Mad Decent	
October 23	Melody Gardot	Sunset in the Blue	Jazz	Decca	
October 23	The Mountain Goats	Getting Into Knives	Alternative rock	Merge	
October 23	Nothing But Thieves	Moral Panic		Sony Music UK	
October 23	Pallbearer	Forgotten Days	Doom metal	Nuclear Blast	
October 23	PUP	This Place Sucks Ass		Little Dipper, Rise	
October 23	Ruel	Bright Lights, Red Eyes		RCA, Sony Australia	
October 23	Sevendust	Blood & Stone	Alternative metal, hard rock	Rise	
October 23	They	The Amanda Tape		Avant Garden Records, Island	
October 23	This Is the Kit	Off Off On	Folk rock	Rough Trade	
October 23	Ty Dolla Sign	Featuring Ty Dolla Sign		Atlantic, Taylor Gang, 4Hunnid	
October 23	Vulfpeck	The Joy of Music, The Job of Real Estate		Vulf Records	
October 23	Wallows	Remote		Atlantic	
October 23	Yvie Oddly	Drag Trap		Voss Music	
October 26	TXT	Minisode1: Blue Hour		Big Hit	
October 26	Twice	Eyes Wide Open	K-pop, dance, city pop	JYP, Republic	
October 30	Andrew Bird	Hark!	Christmas	Loma Vista	
October 30	Ariana Grande	Positions	Pop, R&B	Republic	
October 30	Atmosphere	The Day Before Halloween		Rhymesayers	
October 30	Black Stone Cherry	The Human Condition	Hard rock, Southern rock	Mascot	
October 30	Bring Me the Horizon	Post Human: Survival Horror	Alternative metal, metalcore, nu metal	Sony Music, RCA	
October 30	Busta Rhymes	Extinction Level Event 2: The Wrath of God	Hip-hop	Conglomerate, Empire	
October 30	Cam	The Otherside	Country pop, EDM	RCA	
October 30	CamelPhat	Dark Matter		Sony Music, RCA UK	
October 30	Common	A Beautiful Revolution Pt. 1	Alternative hip-hop, jazz rap	Loma Vista	
October 30	Dizzee Rascal	E3 AF	Grime	Dirtee Stank, Island	
October 30	Draconian	Under a Godless Veil	Gothic metal, doom metal	Napalm	
October 30	Eels	Earth to Dora	Indie rock	E Works, PIAS	
October 30	Elvis Costello	Hey Clockface	Pop rock	Concord	
October 30	Eric Ethridge	Good with Me	Country pop	Anthem	
October 30	For King & Country	A Drummer Boy Christmas	Christmas	Word	
October 30	Goo Goo Dolls	It's Christmas All Over	Christmas, pop rock	Warner	
October 30	Jim White	Misfit's Jubilee	Alternative country	Fluff & Gravy, Loose Music	
October 30	JoJo	December Baby	Christmas	Warner	
October 30	Kate Miller-Heidke	Child in Reverse	Pop	Kate Miller-Heidke, EMI	
October 30	King Von	Welcome to O'Block	Hip-hop, drill, gangsta rap	Only the Family, Empire	
October 30	Kwame	Please, Get Home Safe		Def Jam ANZ	
October 30	Like Moths to Flames	No Eternity in Gold	Metalcore	UNFD	
October 30	Meghan Trainor	A Very Trainor Christmas	Christmas	Epic	
October 30	Midnight Oil	The Makarrata Project		Sony Music Australia	
October 30	Mr. Bungle	The Raging Wrath of the Easter Bunny Demo	Thrash metal	Ipecac	
October 30	Netsky	Second Nature	Drum and bass	Hospital	
October 30	Nothing	The Great Dismal	Shoegaze, alternative rock	Relapse	
October 30	Oneohtrix Point Never	Magic Oneohtrix Point Never		Warp	
October 30	Petit Biscuit	Parachute		Écurie Records	
October 30	Puscifer	Existential Reckoning	Industrial rock, alternative rock, electronic	Alchemy Recordings, BMG	
October 30	Queen Naija	Missunderstood	R&B	Capitol	
October 30	Sam Smith	Love Goes	Pop	Capitol	
October 30	The Spits	VI		Thriftstore Records	
October 30	Suuns	Fiction	Avant rock, noise rock, psychedelic	Secret City, Joyful Noise	
October 30	Tia Gostelow	Chrysalis		Lovely Records	
October 30	Tori Kelly	A Tori Kelly Christmas	Christmas	Capitol	
October 30	Triple One	Panic Force		Sony Music Australia	
October 30	Trippie Redd	Pegasus	Emo rap	10K Projects	
October 30	Wizkid	Made in Lagos	Afro-pop	Sony Music, RCA	

=== November ===
List of albums released in November 2020
Go to: January | February | March | April | May | June | July | August | September | October | November | December | Back to top
Release date	Artist	Album	Genre	Label	Ref.
November 2	Monsta X	Fatal Love	Hip-hop, EDM, R&B	Starship Entertainment	
November 2	AB6IX	Salute		Brand New Music	
November 4	Park Ji-hoon	Message		Maroo	
November 6	Bree Runway	2000and4Eva	Hip-hop, trap, pop	EMI	
November 6	Cory Asbury	To Love a Fool — A Rooftop Experience	Worship	Bethel Music	
November 6	Fates Warning	Long Day Good Night		Metal Blade	
November 6	Heather Trost	Petrichor		Third Man	
November 6	JPEGMafia	EP!		Republic	
November 6	K/DA	All Out		Riot Games, Stone Music	
November 6	Kylie Minogue	Disco	Dance-pop, disco	Darenote, BMG	
November 6	Little Mix	Confetti	Pop, R&B	RCA	
November 6	MacKenzie Porter	Drinkin' Songs: The Collection		Big Loud	
November 6	Mae Muller	No One Else, Not Even You		Capitol	
November 6	Mike Dillon	Suitcase Man		Royal Potato Family	
November 6	Nav and Wheezy	Emergency Tsunami		XO, Republic	
November 6	Novo Amor	Cannot Be, Whatsoever		AllPoints	
November 6	Ólafur Arnalds	Some Kind of Peace			
November 6	Pablo Alborán	Vértigo		Warner	
November 8	Matt Maltese	Krystal		7476 Records	
November 9	GFriend	Walpurgis Night	K-pop, dance	Source, Kakao M	
November 9	Ha Sung-woon	Mirage		Star Crew Entertainment	
November 9	Taemin	Never Gonna Dance Again: Act 2	Pop	SM	
November 11	Orbit	00		Present Label	
November 12	Amaarae	The Angel You Don't Know		Golden Child Entertainment Ltd.	
November 12	Delta Goodrem	Only Santa Knows	Christmas	Sony Music Australia	
November 12	Lali	Libra		Sony Music Argentina	
November 13	2 Chainz	So Help Me God!	Hip-hop	Def Jam	
November 13	AC/DC	Power Up	Hard rock, rock and roll	Columbia	
November 13	Aesop Rock	Spirit World Field Guide	Hip-hop	Rhymesayers	
November 13	Andrea Bocelli	Believe		Sugar Music, Decca	
November 13	Archie Roach	The Songs of Charcoal Lane		Bloodlines Records	
November 13	Benee	Hey U X	Alt-pop	Republic	
November 13	Cakes da Killa and Proper Villains	Muvaland		Classic Music Company	
November 13	Chris Stapleton	Starting Over	Country	Mercury Nashville	
November 13	Future and Lil Uzi Vert	Pluto × Baby Pluto	Hip-hop, trap	Freebandz, Generation Now, Epic	
November 13	George Benson	Weekend in London	Jazz		
November 13	Goodie Mob	Survival Kit	Hip-hop	Organized Noize	
November 13	Josh Teskey and Ash Grunwald	Push the Blues Away		Ivy League	
November 13	Katya	Vampire Fitness		Producer	
November 13	McFly	Young Dumb Thrills		BMG	
November 13	Molchat Doma	Monument		Sacred Bones	
November 13	Paloma Faith	Infinite Things		Sony Music	
November 13	Paris Jackson	Wilted	Alternative folk, folk rock	Republic	
November 13	Pa Salieu	Send Them to Coventry	British hip-hop	Warner Music UK	
November 13	The Wytches	Three Mile Ditch	Surf rock, hard rock	Cable Code Records	
November 16	BtoB 4U	Inside		Cube, Kakao M, U-Cube	
November 16	Roc Marciano	Mt. Marci	East Coast hip-hop, mafioso rap	Marci Enterprises, Art That Kills	
November 17	Woodz	Woops!		Yuehua Entertainment	
November 17	CNBLUE	Re-Code		FNC Entertainment	
November 18	Dean Brody	Boys	Country	Scurvy Dog Music, Starseed Records	
November 18	Kali Uchis	Sin Miedo (del Amor y Otros Demonios)	R&B, reggaeton, bedroom pop	EMI, Interscope	
November 19	Glaive	Cypress Grove	Art pop	Interscope	
November 20	BTS	Be	Pop	Big Hit	
November 20	Cabaret Voltaire	Shadow of Fear	Electronic, industrial	Mute	
November 20	Communic	Hiding from the World	Progressive metal, power metal, thrash metal	AFM	
November 20	The Cribs	Night Network		Sonic Blew, PIAS	
November 20	Dark Tranquillity	Moment	Melodic death metal	Century Media	
November 20	Garth Brooks	Fun	Country	Pearl Records	
November 20	Jeezy	The Recession 2		Def Jam	
November 20	John Fogerty	Fogerty's Factory	Roots rock	BMG	
November 20	Josh Groban	Harmony		Reprise	
November 20	King Gizzard & the Lizard Wizard	K.G.	Psychedelic rock	KGLW	
November 20	Lastlings	First Contact		Rose Avenue, Liberation	
November 20	Mamalarky	Mamalarky	Indie rock, noise pop, progressive rock	Fire Talk Records	
November 20	Megan Thee Stallion	Good News	Hip-hop	300	
November 20	Michael Ball and Alfie Boe	Together at Christmas		Decca	
November 20	Nick Cave	Idiot Prayer (Nick Cave Alone at Alexandra Palace)		Bad Seed Ltd.	
November 20	Phoebe Bridgers featuring Rob Moose	Copycat Killer		Dead Oceans	
November 20	Sfera Ebbasta	Famoso		Island	
November 20	Something for Kate	The Modern Medieval		Universal Australia	
November 20	Tayla Parx	Coping Mechanisms		Atlantic	
November 20	Tim Minchin	Apart Together		BMG	
November 20	Tired Lion	Breakfast for Pathetics		Dew Process, Universal Australia	
November 23	NCT	NCT 2020 Resonance Pt. 2		SM, Capitol	
November 24	Michael Falzarano and Extended Family	A Kaleidoscope Christmas	Christmas	Hypnotation Records	
November 25	Andrea Corr	The Christmas Songs		East West	
November 25	JO1	The Star	J-pop	Lapone	
November 25	Miliyah Kato	Covers -Woman and Man-		Sony Japan	
November 25	Tinashe	Comfort & Joy		Tinashe Music LLC	
November 27	AJ Tracey	Secure the Bag! 2		AJ Tracey	
November 27	Bad Bunny	El Último Tour Del Mundo	Latin trap, reggaeton, alternative rock	Rimas	
November 27	Billie Joe Armstrong	No Fun Mondays		Reprise	
November 27	Gary Barlow	Music Played by Humans		Polydor	
November 27	Granger Smith	Country Things, Vol. 2		Wheelhouse	
November 27	Hatebreed	Weight of the False Self	Metalcore	Nuclear Blast	
November 27	Juicy J	The Hustle Continues	Hip-hop	Trippy Music, eOne	
November 27	Miley Cyrus	Plastic Hearts	Rock, synth-pop, glam rock	RCA	
November 27	Powderfinger	Unreleased		Universal Music Australia	
November 27	Sabrina Claudio	Christmas Blues		SC Entertainment, Atlantic	
November 27	The Smashing Pumpkins	Cyr	Alternative rock, synth-pop	Sumerian	
November 27	Sodom	Genesis XIX	Thrash metal	SPV/Steamhammer	
November 27	Steps	What the Future Holds	Pop, dance-pop, electropop	BMG	
November 27	Tim Burgess	The Ascent of the Ascended		Bella Union	
November 27	Volbeat	Rewind, Replay, Rebound: Live in Deutschland		Republic	
November 27	Waterparks	Fandom: Live in the UK		Hopeless	
November 27	Will Joseph Cook	Something to Feel Good About		Bad Hotel	

=== December ===
List of albums released in December 2020
Go to: January | February | March | April | May | June | July | August | September | October | November | December | Back to top
Release date	Artist	Album	Genre	Label	Ref.
December 1	BoA	Better	R&B, pop	SM	
December 1	Drakeo the Ruler	We Know the Truth			
December 1	Poppy	A Very Poppy Christmas		Sumerian	
December 2	Ichiko Aoba	Windswept Adan	Folk baroque, psychedelic folk	Hermine Records	
December 2	Milet	Who I Am		SME	
December 3	Tini	Tini Tini Tini		Hollywood	
December 4	Arctic Monkeys	Live at the Royal Albert Hall		Domino	
December 4	Can't Swim	Someone Who Isn't Me		Pure Noise	
December 4	Death Cab for Cutie	The Georgia EP			
December 4	Gama Bomb	Sea Savage	Thrash metal	Prosthetic	
December 4	Geographer	Down and Out in the Garden of Earthly Delights			
December 4	Goldfinger	Never Look Back	Punk rock, pop-punk, ska punk	Big Noise	
December 4	Gone Is Gone	If Everything Happens for a Reason...Then Nothing Really Matters at All		Clouds Hill	
December 4	Grandson	Death of an Optimist		Fueled by Ramen	
December 4	High Contrast	Notes from the Underground	Drum and bass		
December 4	Hollywood Undead	New Empire, Vol. 2	Rock, hip-hop, rap rock	Dove & Grenade Media, BMG	
December 4	Inna	Heartbreaker		Global	
December 4	Kelly Jones	Don't Let the Devil Take Another Day		Parlophone	
December 4	Mariah Carey	Mariah Carey's Magical Christmas Special	Christmas	Sony Music	
December 4	Mike Dillon	1918		Royal Potato Family	
December 4	The Network	Money Money 2020 Part II: We Told Ya So!		Warner, Joe Robot Records	
December 4	Prurient and Kelly Moran	Chain Reaction at Dusk		Hospital	
December 4	Red City Radio	Paradise	Punk rock	Pure Noise	
December 4	Rico Nasty	Nightmare Vacation	Hip-hop	Atlantic, Sugar Trap	
December 4	Russell Dickerson	Southern Symphony	Country	Triple Tigers	
December 4	Shawn Mendes	Wonder	Pop	Island	
December 4	Sigur Rós	Odin's Raven Magic	Classical, post-rock	Krúnk, Warner Classics	
December 4	Tori Amos	Christmastide	Christmas	Decca	
December 4	Your Old Droog	Dump YOD: Krutoy Edition			
December 4	Yung Baby Tate	After the Rain		Raedio	
December 4	Yungblud	Weird!	Indie rock, pop-punk	Locomotion Recordings, Geffen, Interscope	
December 10	Sturgill Simpson	Cuttin' Grass, Vol. 2: The Cowboy Arms Sessions	Bluegrass	High Top Mountain, Thirty Tigers	
December 11	Aitana	11 Razones	Pop rock	Universal Music	
December 11	The Avalanches	We Will Always Love You	Sampledelia, psychedelia	Astralwerks	
December 11	Belle and Sebastian	What to Look for in Summer		Matador	
December 11	Boldy James and Real Bad Man	Real Bad Boldy	Hip-hop	Real Bad Man	
December 11	Boris with Merzbow	2R0I2P0	Doom metal, noise rock	Relapse	
December 11	Channel Tres	I Can't Go Outside	House, West Coast hip-hop	Art For Their Good	
December 11	Cold Chisel	The Live Tapes Vol. 5		Cold Chisel Music	
December 11	Foster the People	In the Darkest of Nights, Let the Birds Sing	Indie rock, psychedelic pop		
December 11	Foxy Shazam	Burn			
December 11	Frock Destroyers	Frock4Life		PEG	
December 11	Guided by Voices	Styles We Paid For	Garage rock, |indie rock	Guided by Voices, Inc.	
December 11	Jack Harlow	Thats What They All Say	Hip-hop	Generation Now, Atlantic	
December 11	Jason Lancaster	Say I'm What You Want		We Are Triumphant Records, The Orchard	
December 11	Kid Cudi	Man on the Moon III: The Chosen	Hip-hop, cloud rap, psychedelia	Wicked Awesome Records, Republic	
December 11	Less Than Jake	Silver Linings	Ska punk	Pure Noise	
December 11	Roxette	Bag of Trix	Pop rock	Rhino	
December 11	Taylor Swift	Evermore	Alternative	Republic	
December 16	Arca	Riquiquí;Bronze-Instances(1-100)		XL	
December 16	Mica Levi	Ruff Dog			
December 18	Ali Akbar Khan	Bear's Sonic Journals: That Which Colors the Mind	Indian classical music	Owsley Stanley Foundation	
December 18	Cancer Bats	You'll Never Break Us // Separation Sessions, Vol. 1		Batskull Records, New Danger Records	
December 18	E-40 & Too Short	Ain't Gone Do It/Terms and Conditions		Trunk Productions, Heavy on the Grind Entertainment, Empire	
December 18	Hecker and Okkyung Lee	Statistique Synthétique / Teum (the Silvery Slit)		Portraits GRM	
December 18	Moor Mother & Billy Woods	Brass	Indie rap	Backwoodz Studioz	
December 18	Paul McCartney	McCartney III	Rock	Capitol	
December 19	Luys Bien	Firme Albor	Latin		
December 23	Chō Tokimeki Sendenbu	Tokimeki ga Subete		Avex	
December 23	Navy Blue	Song of Sage: Post Panic!		Freedom Sounds	
December 24	Elva Hsiao	Naked Truth		TakeOne Music	
December 24	Moby	Live Ambients – Improvised Recordings Vol. 1		Mobyambient	
December 25	00110100 01010100	871		Text	
December 25	Four Tet	Parallel	Ambient house	Text	
December 25	Playboi Carti	Whole Lotta Red	Rage	AWGE, Interscope	
December 25	Worm Shepherd	In the Wake ov Sòl	Death metal		
