= Live in Paris '19 =

Live album by King Gizzard & the Lizard Wizard
- Released: 10 January 2020
- Recorded: 14 October 2019
- Venue: Olympia, Paris, France
- Length: 92:48
- Producer: Stu Mackenzie

King Gizzard & the Lizard Wizard chronology
Infest the Rats' Nest (2019)	Live in Paris '19 (2020)	Live in Adelaide '19 (2020)

Live in Paris '19 is the first in a trio of benefit live albums by Australian psychedelic rock band King Gizzard & the Lizard Wizard, which was released digitally to Bandcamp on 10 January 2020. It was released simultaneously with one other live album, Live in Adelaide '19. The third album Live in Brussels '19 was then released five days later. The album debuted at number nine on the ARIA Albums Chart.

== Background ==
The album features a set by the band performed at the Olympia in Paris on 14 October 2019. The tracks span seven of the band’s albums: Polygondwanaland, Flying Microtonal Banana, Infest the Rats' Nest, Gumboot Soup, Nonagon Infinity, I'm in Your Mind Fuzz, and Fishing for Fishies.

All of the proceeds have gone to Wildlife Victoria.

== Track listing ==
Live in Paris '19 track listing
No.	Title	Length
1.	"Evil Star"	1:54
2.	"Venusian 2"	3:45
3.	"Perihelion"	3:21
4.	"Crumbling Castle"	8:24
5.	"The Fourth Colour"	3:39
6.	"Deserted Dunes Welcome Weary Feet"	1:56
7.	"The Castle in the Air"	1:18
8.	"Muddy Water"	4:17
9.	"People-Vultures"	5:32
10.	"Mr. Beat"	4:40
11.	"Hot Water"	5:25
12.	"This Thing"	6:31
13.	"Billabong Valley"	6:45
14.	"Nuclear Fusion"	5:13
15.	"Anoxia"	3:38
16.	"All Is Known"	3:38
17.	"Boogieman Sam"	5:52
18.	"Mars for the Rich"	4:22
19.	"Am I in Heaven?"	12:33
Total length:		92:48

== Personnel ==
Credits for Live in Paris '19 adapted from Bandcamp.

- Michael Cavanagh – drums
- Cook Craig – guitar, keyboards
- Lucas Harwood (Skinner) – bass guitar
- Ambrose Kenny-Smith – harmonica, vocals, keyboards, percussion
- Stu Mackenzie – vocals, guitar, keyboards, mixing
- Eric Moore – drums
- Joey Walker – guitar, vocals

Additional personnel

- Gaspard De Meulemeester – live recording
- Sam Joseph – live recording
- Stacey Wilson – live recording
- Jason Galea – cover design

== Charts ==
Sales chart performance for Live in Paris '19
Chart (2020)	Peak position
Australian Albums (ARIA)	9

== See also ==
- List of 2020 albums
