= Live in Brussels '19 =

Live album by King Gizzard & the Lizard Wizard
- Released: 15 January 2020
- Recorded: 8–9 October 2019
- Venue: Ancienne Belgique, Brussels, Belgium
- Length: 95:24
- Producer: Stu Mackenzie

King Gizzard & the Lizard Wizard chronology
Live in Adelaide '19 (2020)	Live in Brussels '19 (2020)	Chunky Shrapnel (2020)

Live in Brussels '19 is the third in a trio of benefit live albums by Australian psychedelic rock band King Gizzard & the Lizard Wizard, which was released digitally to Bandcamp on 15 January 2020. The previous two live albums, Live in Adelaide '19, and Live in Paris '19, were both released five days prior. The album debuted at number 34 on the ARIA Albums Chart.

== Background ==
The album features a set by the band performed at the Ancienne Belgique in Brussels on 8 and 9 October 2019. The tracks come from eight of the band's albums: Nonagon Infinity, Murder of the Universe, Infest the Rats' Nest, Fishing for Fishies, Gumboot Soup, Paper Mâché Dream Balloon, Oddments, and Float Along – Fill Your Lungs.

All of the proceeds have gone to Wires Wildlife Rescue, in response to the 2019–20 Australian bushfires.

== Track listing ==
Tracks 1–9 were recorded from the 8 October 2019 concert, and Tracks 10–17 were from the 9 October concert.

Live in Brussels '19 track listing
No.	Title	Length
1.	"Evil Star"	1:51
2.	"Venusian 2"	3:44
3.	"Superbug"	6:49
4.	"The Lord of Lightning"	5:11
5.	"Alter Me III"	0:47
6.	"Altered Beast IV"	4:48
7.	"People-Vultures"	5:48
8.	"This Thing"	6:13
9.	"Sense"	8:46
10.	"The Wheel"	7:40
11.	"The Bird Song"	4:45
12.	"Down the Sink"	4:30
13.	"Work This Time"	7:11
14.	"Robot Stop"	5:43
15.	"Big Fig Wasp"	4:34
16.	"Gamma Knife"	4:54
17.	"Float Along – Fill Your Lungs"	12:11
Total length:		95:24

== Personnel ==
Credits for Live in Brussels '19 adapted from Bandcamp.

- Michael Cavanagh – drums
- Cook Craig – guitar, keyboards, vocals
- Ambrose Kenny-Smith – harmonica, vocals, keyboards, percussion
- Stu Mackenzie – vocals, guitar, keyboards, mixing
- Eric Moore – drums
- Lucas Harwood - bass
- Joey Walker – guitar, vocals

Additional personnel

- Gaspard De Meulemeester – live recording
- Sam Joseph – live recording
- Stacey Wilson – live recording
- Jason Galea – cover design

== Charts ==
Sales chart performance for Live in Brussels '19
Chart (2020)	Peak position
Australian Albums (ARIA)	34

== See also ==
- List of 2020 albums
