= Mind Hive =

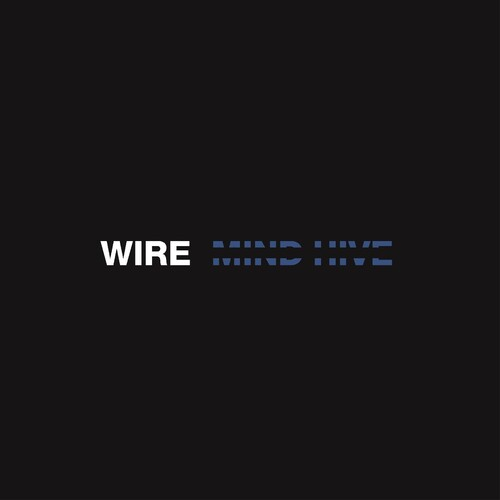

Studio album by Wire
- Released: 24 January 2020
- Recorded: 2018–2019
- Studios: Rockfield Studios (Rockfield, Wales); Swim Studios (London, England)
- Genres: Art punk; post-punk
- Length: 34:52
- Label: Pinkflag
- Producer: Colin Newman

Wire chronology
Silver/Lead (2017)	Mind Hive (2020)	10:20 (2020)

Singles from Mind Hive
- 1. "Cactused" Released: October 2019; 2. "Primed and Ready" Released: January 2020

Mind Hive is the seventeenth studio album from English art punk band Wire, released on 24 January 2020 by Pinkflag. The release was preceded by a music video for "Cactused" made up of clips from the forthcoming documentary People in a Film and streaming audio for "Primed and Ready". They also announced a brief tour of North America to promote the recording.

== Critical reception ==
Professional ratings
Aggregate scores
Source	Rating
AnyDecentMusic?	7.7/10
Metacritic	84/100
Review scores
Source	Rating
AllMusic	4.5/5 stars
DIY	3.5/5 stars
The Guardian	4/5 stars
PopMatters	9/10 stars
Rolling Stone	3.5/5 stars

According to the review aggregator Metacritic, Mind Hive received "universal acclaim" based on a weighted average score of 84 out of 100 from 10 critic scores. Review aggregator AnyDecentMusic? assess the critical consensus as a 7.7 out of 10. Brooklyn Vegan praised the album saying Wire "have honed a sound that pulls from all periods of the band." Alexis Petridis of The Guardian gave the album four out of five stars and said, "If Mind Hive were the debut by a hot new band, you suspect what's left of the music press would be doing their nut over it."

=== Accolades ===
Accolades for Mind Hive
Issuer	Listing	Rank
Rough Trade	Albums of the Year 2020	85

== Track listing ==
All songs written by Colin Newman, except "Oklahoma" by Graham Lewis. All music by Wire. All lyrics by Graham Lewis, except "Cactused" and "Unrepentant" by Colin Newman. (Songwriting credits as per liner notes for Mind Hive)

1. "Be Like Them" – 3:51
2. "Cactused" – 3:35
3. "Primed and Ready" – 2:44
4. "Off the Beach" – 2:23
5. "Unrepentant" – 5:01
6. "Shadows" – 2:46
7. "Oklahoma" – 3:08
8. "Hung" – 7:54
9. "Humming" – 3:30

== Personnel ==
Wire

- Graham Lewis – bass guitar, backing vocals on "Be Like Them" and "Cactused", synthesizer on "Oklahoma", vocals on "Oklahoma" and "Humming"; effects on "Hung"
- Robert Grey – drums, cymbals on "Unrepentant"
- Colin Newman – vocals, guitar; keyboards; acoustic guitar on "Be Like Them", "Off the Beach", "Unrepentant", and "Shadows"; 12-string acoustic guitar on "Off the Beach" and "Unrepentant"; stylophone on "Hung"; tenor guitar on "Be Like Them" and "Unrepentant"
- Matthew Simms – guitar; synths on "Be Like Them", "Primed and Ready", "Unrepentant", "Oklahoma", and "Hung"; effects on "Hung"; organ on "Humming"

Additional musicians

- Sean Douglas – organ on "Humming"
- Harald Pettersson – hurdy gurdy on "Oklahoma"

Technical

- Colin Newman – producer, mixing
- Sean Douglas – engineer
- Matthew Simms – additional engineer
- Denis Blackham – mastering
- Jon Wozencroft – art direction, photography

== Charts ==
Sales chart performance for Mind Hive
Chart	Peak
Belgian Albums (Ultratop Flanders)	155
Scottish Albums (Official Charts)	22
UK Albums (Official Charts)	82

== See also ==
- List of 2020 albums
