= Hex Key (album) =

Studio album by Mamalarky
- Released: April 11, 2025
- Studio: Los Angeles
- Length: 42:41
- Label: Epitaph

Mamalarky chronology
Pocket Fantasy (2022)	Hex Key (2025)

Singles from Hex Key
- 1. "Nothing Lasts Forever" Released: October 22, 2024; 2. "Feels So Wrong" Released: January 29, 2025; 3. "#1 Best Of All Time" Released: February 19, 2025; 4. "Anhedonia" Released: March 18, 2025; 5. "Won't Give Up" Released: April 7, 2025

Hex Key is the third studio album by American indie rock band Mamalarky. It was released on April 11, 2025, by Epitaph Records.

== Background ==
Consisting of thirteen songs, Hex Key incorporates elements of noise pop, alternative R&B, indie rock, art rock, and soft rock. The first album in three years since the band released Pocket Fantasy in 2022, it was recorded in the band's home studio in Los Angeles, and preceded by five singles, "Anhedonia", "Nothing Lasts Forever", "Feels So Wrong", "#1 Best Of All Time", and "Won't Give Up".

== Reception ==
Professional ratings
Review scores
Source	Rating
AllMusic	4/5 stars
The Line of Best Fit	9/10 stars
Paste	7.2/10

AllMusic's Marcy Donelson stated in her review of the album that "the mercurial Hex Key is compellingly weird and rhythmically and melodically catchy, with each of its fluorescent, silver-, or neon-colored tracks holding earworm potential." Paste Magazine rated the album 7.2 out of ten, describing it as "the clearest reconciliation between the tension of their easygoing indie pop and their meticulous musicianship yet." The Line of Best Fit assigned it a rating of nine out of ten and wrote "This relative obscurity grates, not only because these songs are too good not to reach a bigger audience, but also because they address what all of us have to deal with in life: hope, love, uncertainty, and soldiering on no matter what."

== Track listing ==
Hex Key track listing
No.	Title	Length
1.	"Broken Bones"	2:30
2.	"Won't Give Up"	2:51
3.	"The Quiet"	4:06
4.	"Hex Key"	2:15
5.	"Anhedonia"	3:49
6.	"#1 Best of All Time"	2:08
7.	"Take Me"	3:19
8.	"MF"	2:43
9.	"Blow Up"	2:18
10.	"Blush"	3:38
11.	"Nothing Lasts Forever"	3:17
12.	"Feels So Wrong"	2:55
13.	"Here's Everything"	2:52
Total length:		42:41

== Personnel ==
Credits for Hex Key adapted from Bandcamp.

- Livvy Bennett – produced, engineered
- Michael B. Hunter – produced, engineered, mixed
- Joe LaPorta – mastered
