= Welcome to Bobby's Motel =

Studio album by Pottery
- Released: June 26, 2020
- Recorded: Summer 2019
- Studio: Break Glass Studio (Montreal, Quebec, Canada)
- Genre: Garage punk; indie rock; dance-punk; art punk; post-punk; funk rock
- Length: 37:41
- Label: PTKF; Partisan Records
- Producer: Jonathan Schenke

Welcome to Bobby's Motel is the debut full-length studio album by Canadian five-piece indie rock/garage punk band Pottery. It was released on June 26, 2020 through PTKF/Partisan Records, and was produced by Jonathan Schenke. Recording sessions took place at Break Glass Studio in Montreal during summer 2019.

== Critical reception ==
Professional ratings
Aggregate scores
Source	Rating
AnyDecentMusic?	7.5/10
Metacritic	80/100
Review scores
Source	Rating
AllMusic	4/5 stars
CLASH	8/10
DIY	4/5 stars
Exclaim!	7/10
Gigwise	9/10 stars
Loud and Quiet	7/10
NME	4/5 stars
Pitchfork	6.7/10
The Line of Best Fit	8.5/10
Under The Radar	6.5/10 stars

Welcome to Bobby's Motel was met with generally positive reviews. At Metacritic, which assigns a normalized rating out of 100 to reviews from mainstream publications, the album received an average score of 80, based on twelve reviews. The aggregator AnyDecentMusic? has the critical consensus of the album at a 7.5 out of 10, based on thirteen reviews.

Lewis Budd of Gigwise praised the album stating: "a solid contender for album of the year awaits". Alice Jenner of The Line of Best Fit said: "Bobby's Motel is a big, bold slap in the face right from the start. Manic Bobby greets you at the door, takes you by the hand, and leads you straight to the dancefloor". AllMusic's Heather Phares said: "Even when they slow down, there's a lot of excitement in Pottery's music. Though they frequently threaten to steamroll over anyone within earshot of Welcome to Bobby's Motel, the band have so much fun that their listeners probably won't mind". Will Richards of NME said: "'Welcome To Bobby's Motel' sees them flexing their muscles and trying to find their own space within it, all while having a hell of a lot of fun along the way. By the end, you're desperate to find out just who Bobby is and how on earth you can beg, steal or borrow to spend a night in that mysterious motel". Rob Hakimian of DIY said: "Even when entering darker territories Pottery keep things jovial, ensuring the album rattles by with spirits high. Their characters are often down-and-out losers, badly clothed with peeling skin and no money, but when they come to 'Bobby's Motel' none of that matters. Here, the scuzz is celebrated, the outside world is non-existent, and there's always space for another body". Ross Horton of Clash said: "'Welcome to Bobby's Motel' is a superb, lovingly crafted set from a band who have clearly done their homework". Spencer Nafekh-Blanchette of Exclaim! said: "More than anything on this album, the quintet prove they are willing to travel far and wide when it comes to exploring new sounds, while still being able to deliver a cohesive final product". Max Pilley of Loud and Quiet said: "'Welcome to Bobby's Motel' is an endlessly re-listenable album, and fans of post-punk and new wave will find many joys in its contents". Linnie Greene said: "This band is at its best operating at the edge of kitsch and excess, as with the "Monster Mash" voice inexplicably mumbling over "Bobby's Forecast"." Andy Von Pip of Under The Radar said: "Welcome to Bobby's Motel is without a doubt an album that at times is a heck of a lot of fun, but it ultimately leaves you with a vague feeling of wondering who Pottery actually are".

== Track listing ==
No.	Title	Length
1.	"Welcome to Bobby's Motel"	1:58
2.	"Hot Heater"	3:33
3.	"Under the Wires"	3:33
4.	"Bobby's Forecast"	3:03
5.	"Down in the Dumps"	3:03
6.	"Reflection"	3:35
7.	"Texas Drums, Pts. 1–2"	6:21
8.	"NY Inn"	2:26
9.	"What's in Fashion?"	2:41
10.	"Take Your Time"	3:14
11.	"Hot Like Jungle"	3:47
Total length:		37:41

== Personnel ==
- Austin Boylan – guitar, vocals
- Peter Baylis – keyboards, vocals
- Paul Jacobs – drums, vocals, artwork, design, layout
- Jacob Shepansky – guitar, vocals
- Tom Gould – bass, vocals
- Jonathan Schenke – engineering, mixing, producer

== Charts ==
Chart (2020)	Peak position
UK Independent Albums (OCC)	9
UK Vinyl Albums (OCC)	20
