= Mamalarky (album) =

Studio album by Mamalarky
- Released: November 20, 2020
- Recorded: November 2018 – January 2020
- Venue: 30:10
- Studios: Studio 22; Los Angeles, California
- Genres: Indie rock; noise pop; progressive rock
- Label: Fire Talk
- Producer: Joe LaPorta

Mamalarky chronology
Fundamental Thrive Hive (2018)	Mamalarky (2020)

Singles from Mamalarky
- 1. "Fury" Released: January 15, 2020; 2. "Schism Trek" Released: September 15, 2020; 3. "You Make Me Smile" Released: October 17, 2020; 4. "Drug Store Model" Released: November 16, 2020

Mamalarky is the debut studio album by American indie rock band Mamalarky. The album was released on November 20, 2020 through Fire Talk Records.

== Background and recording ==
Recording for the album took over a period of two years, from the time they released their debut extended play, Fundamental Thrive Hive in 2018, to the eponymous debut album. Recording and mixing took place across Los Angeles in Studio 22 and Automatic and the band's hometown of Austin, Texas during those two years. Recording took place from November 2018 until December 2019, and in January 2020, mixing of the album took place in Austin.

== Critical reception ==
Professional ratings
Aggregate scores
Source	Rating
Metacritic	74/100
Review scores
Source	Rating
AllMusic	3.5/5 stars
Gigwise	8/10 stars
Paste	7.5/10
Pitchfork	7.1/10
Under the Radar	7.5/10 stars

Mamalarky was well received by contemporary music critics. On review aggregator website, Metacritic, Mamalarkey received an average rating of 74 out of 100 based on four critic reviews. Jesse Locke, writing for Pitchfork, gave the album a 7.1 out of 10, summarizing that the "Atlanta indie-rock quartet's debut album stands out from their contemporaries’ laid-back melancholy with complex instrumental interplay that inspires lean-forward listening."

Gigwise writer, Niamh Pillinger, gave the album 8 out of 10. Pillinger said that Mamalarky "fuse a multitude of influences to create a unique prog-indie rock sound. With the rest of the band members having their own musical backgrounds – keyboard and synth bass player Michael Hunter plays with White Denim, and drummer Dylan Hill with Big Wy's brass band – there is no shortage of inspiration on their eponymous debut".

== Track listing ==
Mamalarky
No.	Title	Length
1.	"Fury"	2:09
2.	"You Make Me Smile"	3:36
3.	"Schism Trek"	2:32
4.	"Cosine"	3:35
5.	"Big Trouble"	2:52
6.	"Hero"	3:13
7.	"Almighty Heat"	3:34
8.	"Singalong"	1:35
9.	"Drug Store Model"	3:00
10.	"Don't Laugh At Me"	4:04
Total length:		30:10
