= Live in Adelaide '19 =

Live album by King Gizzard & the Lizard Wizard
- Released: 10 January 2020
- Recorded: 12 July 2019
- Venue: Thebarton Theatre, Adelaide, Australia
- Length: 111:22
- Producer: Stu Mackenzie

King Gizzard & the Lizard Wizard chronology
Live in Paris '19 (2020)	Live in Adelaide '19 (2020)	Live in Brussels '19 (2020)

Live in Adelaide '19 is the second in a trio of benefit live albums by Australian psychedelic rock band, King Gizzard & the Lizard Wizard, which was released digitally to Bandcamp on 10 January 2020. It was released simultaneously with one other live album, Live in Paris '19. The third album Live in Brussels '19 was then released five days later. The album debuted at number six on the ARIA Albums Chart.

== Background ==
The album features a set by the band performed at the Thebarton Theatre in Adelaide on 12 July 2019. Most of the tracks come from the band's later releases at the time; Infest the Rats' Nest (which as of this performance had yet to be released), Fishing for Fishies, Flying Microtonal Banana, and Polygondwanaland. Two other tracks come from earlier releases, namely "Hot Water" from I'm in Your Mind Fuzz, and the album closer, a nearly half-hour long rendition of "Head On/Pill" from Float Along – Fill Your Lungs which integrated elements of tracks from other releases such as "Hot Water", "Altered Beast", "Cellophane", "I'm in Your Mind", "Am I in Heaven?" and "Rattlesnake".

All of the proceeds have gone to Animals Australia in response to the 2019–2020 Australian bushfires.

== Track listing ==
Live in Adelaide '19 track listing
No.	Title	Length
1.	"Evil Star"	2:34
2.	"Planet B"	4:17
3.	"Mars for the Rich"	4:13
4.	"Venusian 1"	4:47
5.	"Cyboogie"	6:56
6.	"Real's Not Real"	3:53
7.	"Hot Water"	6:52
8.	"Open Water"	8:04
9.	"Sleep Drifter"	3:17
10.	"Billabong Valley"	7:13
11.	"The Bird Song"	5:28
12.	"Inner Cell"	3:46
13.	"Loyalty"	4:03
14.	"Horology"	2:41
15.	"Plastic Boogie"	4:04
16.	"Organ Farmer"	2:56
17.	"Self-Immolate"	6:36
18.	"Head On/Pill"	29:42
Total length:		112:22

2021 Vinyl Track Listing

Side 1
No.	Title	Length
1.	"Evil Star" (Tape)	2:34
2.	"Planet B"	4:17
3.	"Mars For The Rich"	4:13
4.	"Venusian 1"	4:47

Side 2
No.	Title	Length
1.	"Cyboogie"	6:56
2.	"Real’s Not Real"	3:53
3.	"Hot Water" (With Adam Halliwell of Mildlife on flute)	6:52

Side 3
No.	Title	Length
1.	"Open Water"	8:04
2.	"Sleep Drifter"	3:17
3.	"Billabong Valley"	7:13

Side 4
No.	Title	Length
1.	"The Bird Song"	5:28
2.	"Inner Cell"	3:46
3.	"Loyalty"	4:03
4.	"Horology"	2:41
5.	"Plastic Boogie"	4:04

Side 5
No.	Title	Length
1.	"Organ Farmer"	2:56
2.	"Self-Immolate"	6:36
3.	"Head On/Pill" (With Adam Halliwell on flute)	8:30

Side 6
No.	Title	Length
1.	"Head On/Pill" (Con’t)	21:13

== Personnel ==
King Gizzard & the Lizard Wizard

- Stu Mackenzie – vocals, guitar, keyboards, Vocoder, mixing
- Cook Craig – guitar, keyboard
- Joey Walker – guitar, vocals
- Ambrose Kenny-Smith – harmonica, vocals, keyboard, percussion
- Lucas Harwood – bass guitar
- Michael Cavanagh – drums
- Eric Moore – drums

Additional musicians

- Adam Halliwell – flute

Production

- Sam Joseph – recording
- Stacey Wilson – recording
- Gaspard De Meulemeester – recording
- Jason Galea – cover design

== Charts ==
Sales chart performance for Live in Adelaide '19
Chart (2020)	Peak position
Australian Albums (ARIA)	6
