= Fogerty's Factory =

Studio album by John Fogerty
- Released: November 20, 2020
- Genre: Roots rock
- Length: 42:15
- Label: BMG
- Producer: Julie Fogerty

John Fogerty chronology
| Wrote a Song for Everyone (2013) | Fogerty's Factory (2020) | Legacy: The Creedence Clearwater Revival Years (2025) |

Fogerty's Factory is the tenth solo studio album by American guitarist and singer-songwriter John Fogerty, who served as a member of his family band, Fogerty's Factory. It was initially released as an extended play on May 28, 2020, and was later released as a full-length album on November 20, 2020, both through BMG.

== Background and release ==
While on lockdown during the COVID-19 pandemic in early 2020, Fogerty, accompanied by sons Shane and Tyler and daughter Kelsey, began releasing performance videos of previously released originals and covers. Under the name "Fogerty's Factory", the group performed remotely on The Late Show with Stephen Colbert, NPR's Tiny Desk Concerts, and SiriusXM's Classic Vinyl station. Initially collecting seven songs from the remote performances, the Fogerty's Factory EP was released on May 28, 2020, coinciding with Fogerty's 75th birthday. The 12-track full-length album edition featuring additional lockdown performances followed on November 20. The album name and cover art are a direct reference to the Creedence Clearwater Revival album Cosmo's Factory.

== Critical reception ==
Professional ratings
Aggregate scores
| Source | Rating |
|---|---|
| Metacritic | 71/100 |
Review scores
| Source | Rating |
| AllMusic | 3/5 stars |
| Classic Rock | 3/5 stars |
| Mojo | 4/5 stars |
| Uncut | 3.5/5 stars |

AllMusic critic Stephen Thomas Erlewine says, "The Fogertys don't tinker too much with the arrangements of any of the songs here, but the recordings do have a casual, relaxed feel that separates them from their original recordings or any live versions the rocker has released over the years." He then states, "This is a warm, low-key affair, a record about family bonds and togetherness that gets by on its gentle, endearing vibes." Henry Yates of Classic Rock Magazine gave Fogerty's Factory three out of five stars, stating, "This factory runs on goodwill. In less cataclysmic times the exercise might be mawkish, and while a cover of Lean On Me is well-meant it feels a little like eating too much cake icing."

== Track listing ==
All songs written by John Fogerty, except "Lean on Me", written by Bill Withers, and "City of New Orleans", written by Steve Goodman.

1. "Centerfield" – 4:01
2. "Have You Ever Seen the Rain?" – 2:37
3. "Lean on Me" – 4:24
4. "Hot Rod Heart" – 3:11
5. "Blue Moon Nights" – 2:56
6. "Tombstone Shadow" – 4:08
7. "City of New Orleans" – 4:45
8. "Proud Mary" – 3:16
9. "Blueboy" – 4:02
10. "Bad Moon Rising" – 2:27
11. "Fortunate Son" – 2:35
12. "Don't You Wish It Was True" – 3:53

== Personnel ==
Credits adapted from Tidal.

=== Fogerty's Factory ===
- John Fogerty – vocals, guitar, harmonica
- Shane Fogerty – vocals, guitar, bass
- Tyler Fogerty – vocals, guitar, bass, keyboards
- Kelsey Fogerty – guitar, drums

=== Additional personnel ===
- Julie Fogerty – producer, cover art, photography
- Kevin Estrada – photography
- Lacee Benda – photography
- Lyndsay Lebiedzinski – photography
- Bob Fogerty – cover photo, management
- Dale Voelker – art direction, design
- Simon Edwards – product manager
- David Spero – executive producer
- John Loeffler – executive producer
- Bob Ludwig – mastering
- Michael Kachko – marketing
- David Whiston – guitar technician
- Ryan Matthias – guitar technician

== Charts ==
Chart performance for Fogerty's Factory
| Chart (2020) | Peak position |
|---|---|
| Belgian Albums (Ultratop Flanders) | 131 |
| Swiss Albums (Schweizer Hitparade) | 39 |
