= Your Hero Is Not Dead =

Studio album by Westerman
- Released: 5 June 2020
- Genre: Experimental pop
- Length: 39:48
- Labels: Partisan (US); PIAS (UK/Europe)

Westerman chronology
Ark (2018)	Your Hero Is Not Dead (2020)	An Inbuilt Fault (2023)

Professional ratings
Aggregate scores
Source	Rating
AnyDecentMusic?	7.7/10
Metacritic	78/100
Review scores
Source	Rating
AllMusic	4/5 stars
Beats Per Minute	62%
Clash	8/10
Crack Magazine	8/10
DIY	3.5/5 stars
Exclaim!	7/10
Gigwise	9/10
The Line of Best Fit	8.5/10
NME	4/5 stars
Pitchfork	8/10

Your Hero Is Not Dead is the debut studio album by English musician Westerman. It was released on 5 June 2020 under Partisan Records in the US and PIAS Recordings in the Europe.

== Singles ==
The first single to be released from the album, "Blue Comanche" was announced on 17 January 2020. The second single "Think I'll Stay" was announced on 11 March 2020, along with the announcement of the album. The third single to be released from album "Waiting on Design" was released on 8 April 2020. The fourth single, the same name as the album, was announced 21 April 2020. On 7 May 2020, Westerman released the fifth single "The Line".

== Critical reception ==
Your Hero Is Not Dead was met with "generally favorable" reviews from critics. At Metacritic, which assigns a weighted average rating out of 100 to reviews from mainstream publications, the album received an average score of 78, based on 10 reviews. Aggregator Album of the Year gave the album 76 out of 100 based on a critical consensus of 15 reviews. At AnyDecentMusic?, the release received 7.7 out of 10.

== Track listing ==
All tracks are written by Will Westerman.

Your Hero Is Not Dead track listing
No.	Title	Length
1.	"Drawbridge"	2:10
2.	"The Line"	3:17
3.	"Big Nothing Glow"	3:22
4.	"Waiting on Design"	4:35
5.	"Think I'll Stay"	3:20
6.	"Dream Appropriate"	1:44
7.	"Easy Money"	4:33
8.	"Blue Comanche"	3:28
9.	"Confirmation"	4:18
10.	"Paper Dogs"	3:06
11.	"Float Over"	2:20
12.	"Your Hero Is Not Dead"	3:35
Total length:		39:48

== Release history ==
Region	Date	Format	Label	Catalogue
United States	5 June 2020	CD; digital download; streaming; LP	Partisan	PTKF2181-1
UK and Europe	5 June 2020	CD; digital download; streaming; LP	PIAS	PIASR1140DA
