= Pottery (band) =

Canadian indie rock/garage punk band

- Origin: Montreal, Quebec, Canada
- Genres: Garage punk; indie rock; dance-punk; art punk; post-punk
- Years active: 2017–present
- Labels: PTKF; Partisan Records
- Members: Austin Boylan; Jacob Shepansky; Peter Baylis; Paul Jacobs; Tom Gould
- Website: Potteryband.com; Bandcamp; Twitter

Pottery is a Canadian five-piece indie rock/garage punk band from Montreal, Quebec, composed of Austin Boylan, guitarist Jacob Shepansky, keyboardist Peter Baylis, drummer Paul Jacobs and bassist Tom Gould. They released their debut single Hank Williams on November 28, 2018, which was later included in their 2019 extended play No. 1. On June 26, 2020, the band released their first full-length album, Welcome to Bobby's Motel.

== Discography ==
Studio albums

Title
Welcome to Bobby's Motel
- Released: June 26, 2020
- Label: PTKF

Extended plays

Title
No. 1
- Released: May 10, 2019
- Label: PTKF/Partisan Records

Singles

- 2018 - "Hank Williams"

Videography

List of music videos, years released and director
Title	Year	Director
"The Craft"	2019	Bronwyn Ford & Max Taeuschel
"Texas Drums Pt. I"	2020	Charlie Coote & Jacob Shepansky & Paul Jacobs
"Take Your Time"	2020	Paul Jacobs & Raised by Bears
"Hot Like Jungle"	2020	Paul Jacobs
