= Erodelia =

Brazilian hard rock band

- Origin: Santos, São Paulo
- Genres: Hard rock
- Years active: 2010–present
- Members: Dell; Yan Cambiucci; Danilove; Erick Ajifu; Heittor Jabbur

Erodelia (a portmanteau of the Greek word "eros", the god of love; and the Latin word "delia", which means demonstration) is a Brazilian rock band, formed in 2010. It gained notoriety after taking part of the Batalha de Bandas (Bands Battle) Pepsi by Pleimo and being selected with four other groups to perform at the 6th edition of Rock in Rio in 2015.

The band's influences, dating back mainly to the 1970s/80s, include Metallica, Mötley Crüe, AC/DC, Led Zeppelin, Queen, Kiss and Black Sabbath. Among artists that have invited them as opening acts for their shows or that have expressed admiration for their music are Cachorro Grande, Tico Santa Cruz, Paulo Miklos and Matanza.

== History ==
The promotional video for the track "Essa Semana Eu Tirei pra te Odiar" featured a guest appearance of Brazilian director Zé do Caixão. The title of Santa Madeira EP is a word play with Hollywood, which sounds like "holy wood" and can be translated as "santa madeira" in Portuguese.

In 2014, they won the Rock Show Award at the Rock Artist category.

In April 2020, they released their first, self-titled studio album, with 50% of its proceedings going to COVID-19 treatment and prevention efforts, in the context of the disease's pandemic.

== Members ==
- Caio "Dell" del Lucchesi – vocals
- Yan Cambiucci – lead guitar
- Danilove – rhythm guitar
- Erick Ajifu – bass
- Heittor Jabbur – drums

== Discography ==
=== Extended plays ===
- Me Segura Neném (2011)
- Santa Madeira (2014)
- Fora da Lei (2014)

=== Albums ===
- Erodelia (2020)
