= Westerman (musician) =

British singer-songwriter

- Born: Will Westerman
- Origin: London, England
- Genre: Art pop
- Occupations: Singer-songwriter; musician
- Years active: 2010s–present
- Label: Partisan Records

Westerman is the stage name of British singer-songwriter Will Westerman. His debut album, Your Hero Is Not Dead (2020), was released to critical acclaim, followed by An Inbuilt Fault (2023) and A Jackal's Wedding (2025).

== Career ==
Originally from London, Westerman first gained attention in the late 2010s with a series of music releases marked by intricate, soft-rock-inflected production. Critics have noted similarity of Westerman's music with various artists, including Arthur Russell, Talk Talk, and Nick Drake.

=== Your Hero Is Not Dead (2020) ===
Recorded in Lisbon and London, Westerman's debut album, Your Hero Is Not Dead, was released on Partisan Records in 2020. Produced with Nathan Jenkins (Bullion), the album combines "whimsical curiosity and technical proficiency," and explores themes of uncertainty and self-interrogation.

=== An Inbuilt Fault (2023) ===
Westerman's second album, An Inbuilt Fault was released in 2023, receiving positive reviews, leading him to be named Billboard's 'indie artist of the month'.

=== A Jackal's Wedding (2025) ===
Produced with Marta Salogni, A Jackal's Wedding incorporates contributions from drummers Stella Mozgawa and James Krivchenia and foregrounds piano- and guitar-based songs that are more minimalist in composition than his earlier albums. The album was written in Athens and recorded on the Greek island Hydra. It received acclaim upon release.

== Personal life ==
Westerman currently lives in Greece. He spent time during the pandemic in Italy, where his father lives.
