= Mamalarky =

Indie rock band

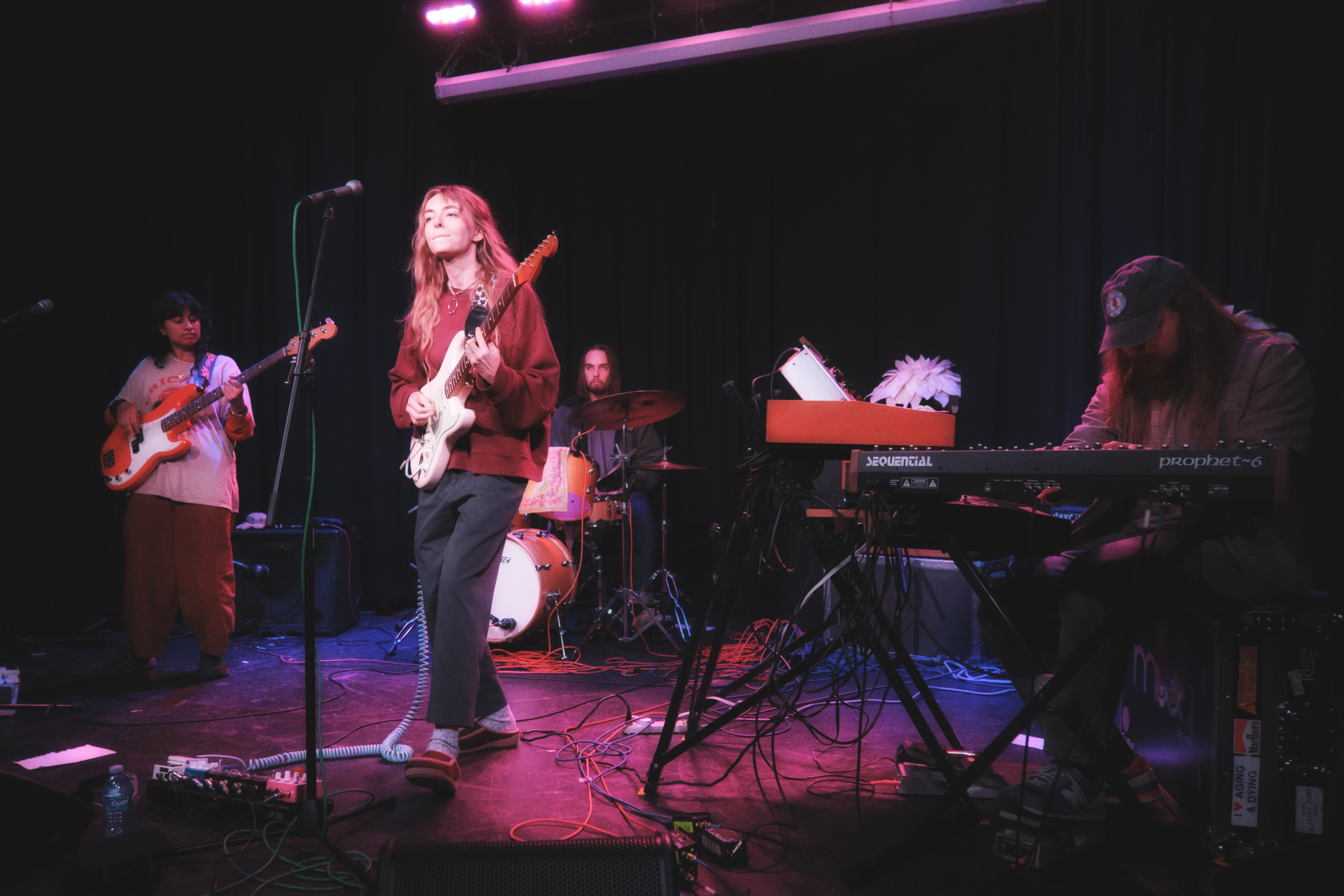
- Mamalarky in 2022 (from left to right: Noor Khan, Livvy Bennett, Dylan Hill, and Michael Hunter)

Background information
- Origin: Austin, Texas, U.S.
- Genres: Indie rock, psych rock, lo-fi, jazz rock
- Years active: 2016–present
- Label: Fire Talk
- Members: Livvy Bennett; Michael Hunter; Dylan Hill; Noor Khan
- Website: www.mamalarky.com

Mamalarky is an American indie rock band formed in 2016 in Austin, Texas. The group is based in Los Angeles, California after a period residing in Atlanta, Georgia.

== History ==
Singer and guitarist Livvy Bennett and drummer Dylan Hill first became acquainted in middle school and later met keyboardist Michael Hunter in high school. After high school, the members began playing together and adopted the name Mamalarky by 2016. The band was initially active in their hometown of Austin before relocating to Los Angeles. Bennett played bass on tour with Cherry Glazerr and Hunter played with White Denim during this time.

Mamalarky released their debut EP, Fundamental Thrive Hive, in May 2018. Bassist Noor Khan joined the band late that year in response to a call for musicians put out by Bennett on Tinder.

In December 2019, the band signed to Brooklyn based record label Fire Talk. The following month, they released "Fury", the first single off their debut album. This was followed by "How To Say" in May 2020 and lead single "Schism Trek" that September. Bennett, Hunter, and Khan relocated to Atlanta late that year. The band released the final singles from their full length debut, “You Make Me Smile” and "Drug Store Model", in October and November 2020 respectively.

Mamalarky’s self-titled debut album, a culmination of two years of effort, was released on November 20, 2020. Pitchfork contributor Jesse Locke praised the band’s “complex instrumental interplay”, awarding the album a rating of 7.1 out of 10. Ben Salmon of Paste magazine gave the album a rating of 7.5, describing the album's sound as "fussed over" and "distant" but ultimately commending the group's fluency in multiple genres.

The band’s second album, Pocket Fantasy, was released in September 2022 on Fire Talk Records. Writing for Pitchfork, critic Will Gottsegen rated the album 7.3 out of 10, praising the balance the band struck between technical proficiency and “playfulness”.

The band released its third studio album, Hex Key, on April 11, 2025, through Epitaph Records.

== Members ==
- Livvy Bennett – vocals, guitar (2016–present)
- Dylan Hill – drums (2016–present)
- Michael Hunter – keyboard (2016–present)
- Noor Khan – bass (2018–present)

== Discography ==
=== Studio albums ===
Title	Details
Mamalarky	Released: November 20, 2020; Label: Fire Talk Records; Formats: LP, digital download
Pocket Fantasy	Released: September 30, 2022; Label: Fire Talk Records; Formats: LP, digital download
Hex Key	Released: April 11, 2025; Label: Epitaph Records; Formats: LP, digital download

=== EPs ===
- Fundamental Thrive Hive (2018)

=== Singles ===
- "Loose Leaf" (2017)
- "Nonmonogamy" (2017)
- "Mama's Bear" (2018)
- "Hero" (2019)
- "Fury" (2020)
- "How to Say" (2020)
- "Schism Trek" (2020)
- "You Make Me Smile" (2020)
- "Drug Store Model" (2020)
- "Meadow" (2021)
- "Moss" (2021)
- "You Know I Know" (2022)
- "Mythical Bonds" (2022)
- "It Hurts" (2022)
- "Shining Armor" (2022)
- "Nothing Lasts Forever" (2024)
- "Feels So Wrong" (2025)
- "#1 Best Of All Time" (2025)
- "Anhedonia" (2025)
- "Won't Give Up" (2025)
