= Goldfish (Hit-Boy and the Alchemist album) =

2025 collaborative album by Hit-Boy and the Alchemist

Studio album by Hit-Boy and the Alchemist
- Released: October 24, 2025
- Recorded: 2024–2025
- Genre: West Coast hip-hop
- Length: 49:53
- Labels: Surf Club; ALC; Empire
- Producers: Hit-Boy; The Alchemist; Chase N. Cashe

Hit-Boy chronology
High-Class Wiggler (2025)	Goldfish (2025)	Yeast Talkin' (2025)

The Alchemist chronology
Alfredo 2 (2025)	Goldfish (2025)	Mercy (2025)

Singles from Goldfish
- 1. "Business Merger" Released: October 3, 2025; 2. "Celebration Moments" Released: October 17, 2025

Goldfish (stylized in all caps) is a collaborative studio album by American record producers and rappers Hit-Boy and the Alchemist. It was released on October 24, 2025, through Surf Club, ALC Records, and Empire Distribution. Goldfish is the duo's second collaborative album following Blacks & Whites (2024). As the project features both producers rapping, the Alchemist was inspired to rap by Larry June, leading to the duo's first single "Slipping Into Darkness" (2023). Guest appearances include Conway the Machine, Havoc, Boldy James, Jay Worthy, Johnathan Hullet, and Big Hit.

A West Coast hip-hop album recorded in Los Angeles and New York between 2024 and 2025, the duo described the production of Goldfish as relaxed, collaborative, and organic, emphasizing their mutual trust and compromise in making the album successful and cohesive. An accompanying film was conceptualized during the album's production, which was directed by Abteen Bagger.

Goldfish was promoted with two singles, "Business Merger" and "Celebration Moments (featuring Havoc), and previews of the accompanying film in New York City, Los Angeles, and Las Vegas. The album received generally positive reviews from music critics, praising the duo's collaborative effort while both rapping and producing. One critic compared Goldfish to J Dilla and Madlib's Champion Sound (2003).

== Background ==
Hit-Boy first connected with the Alchemist in 2010, when the former emailed beats for rapper Prodigy, who was recently out of prison at the time. One of the beats in the collection included "1 Train" (2013) on ASAP Rocky's debut studio album, Long. Live. ASAP (2013). A decade later, they made their debut collaboration on the single, "Slipping Into Darkness" (2023), where they rap on each other's beats. They collaborated extensively following the single in 2024, releasing the three-track EP, Theodore & Andre, and the album, Black & Whites (2024), with the latter featuring Big-Hit, Hit-Boy's father.

When the Alchemist was asked by Mackenzie Cummings-Grady of Billboard on what inspired him to get back into rapping, he responded that while he had been writing lyrics with hip-hop duo Gangrene and rapper and record producer Oh No, fellow rapper Larry June inspired him to get back into rapping, leading to the conception of the song "Slipping Into Darkness" (2023). In 2025, the year of the album's release, he worked with music artists Larry June, 2 Chainz, Yasiin Bey, Mobb Deep, Boldy James, Armand Hammer, Erykah Badu, and Freddie Gibbs on various projects.

== Production ==
Goldfish was recorded in Los Angeles and New York between 2024 and 2025. During a Billboard interview, Hit-Boy stated that the production of the album was organic and collaborative, describing his working relationship with the Alchemist as relaxed. Hit-Boy revealed that hearing the album's finalized mixes influenced his understanding of the project's sound, particularly its warm, vinyl-like quality, as well as being inspired to use this approach into his own work. The Alchemist also emphasized mutual trust and compromise as reasons for the album's success. He commented that putting away individual egos paved way for their distinct styles to merge into a cohesive project.

The Alchemist stated that the accompanying film developed gradually without an initial plan, evolving into a fully realized film rather than promotional material. He described the production as a learning experience that gave him a greater appreciation for filmmaking and the process behind film production. Hit-Boy was inspired by thefilm concept after seeing the work of its director Abteen Bagheri, particularly his visual effects. The film's production involved a custom-built animatronic dog, with the duo financing some of the production costs from their own resources.

== Composition ==
"Business Merger"
A 20-second excerpt of the lead single "Business Merger", highlighting Hit-Boy's production and flow on Goldfish.

Goldfish is a West Coast hip-hop album with a running time of forty-nine and fifty-three seconds. The album emphasizes producers Hit-Boy and the Alchemist as rappers who "refuse to treat the mic as a novelty". Guest appearances include Conway the Machine, Havoc, Boldy James, Jay Worthy, Johnathan Hullet, and Big Hit. The album ranges from introspection on "Celebration Moments" to a focus on bars on "Business Merger", with its themes usually reflecting on logevity, respect, success, and self-worth. Quincy of Ratings Game Music described the album's beats as "glorious, soulful, and impossibly refined."

Hit-Boy's polished and structured beats blend in with the Alchemist's warm and groove-based beats. Eight tracks are produced by Hit-Boy, six by the Alchemist, and one by Chase N. Cashe. "Business Merger" opens with layered drums, clipped vocal chops, and shared flows. "Mick & Cooley" features East Coast rapper Conway the Machine, which Hip Hop Golden Age described as "recorded in the middle of a smoke-filled studio session." "Ricky" features a looping piano line and crisp drums with Hit-Boy's vivid storytelling based on memories and regret. "Celebration Moments" is a slow, eerie-sounding described as an "after-hours toast to survival". "Not Much" shows rapper Boldy James using his calm precision, while "All Gas No Brakes" features a sense of ease and humor through guest features Jay Worthy and Big Hit.

== Promotion and release ==
On October 3, 2025, Hit-Boy and the Alchemist released the album's lead single, "Business Merger", along with an accompanying music video. On October 7, they announced a collaborative album titled Goldfish, scheduling its release on October 24 with distribution from Empire. They also announced an accompanying film, which featured cameos from Danny Trejo and Simon Rex. The premise is based on "a squad of hit men disguised as carpet cleaners" attempting to leave their criminal life in a "chaotic flurry of events."

The film premiered on October 8 at The Roxy in New York City. Following its initial premiere, Hit-Boy and the Alchemist hosted various screenings of the film in New York City, Los Angeles, and Las Vegas, of which the latter took place at ComplexCon. On October 17, "Celebration Moments" was released as the album's second single, which featured rapper and producer Havoc. On October 22, the duo revealed the track list to the album. Two days later, Goldfish was released through Surf Club, ALC Records, and Empire Distribution. It marks Hit-Boy's first album release since leaving his 18-year publishing deal. In addition, the music video for "Ricky" was released through YouTube, which is directed by Issac Garcia.

== Critical reception ==
Professional ratings
Review scores
Source	Rating
Hip Hop Golden Age	7.5/10

Hip Hop Golden Age praised the album and compared it to J Dilla and Madlib's Champion Sound (2003), describing it as living in reflection. In a short review, Preezy Brown of Vibe compliment Hit-Boy and the Alchemist's rapping style, commenting that they treat "the craft not as a side hustle, but as an art form with purpose and precision." Similarly, Quincy of Ratings Game Music complimented the duo's production while adding their own verses.

== Track listing ==
All tracks are written by Chauncey Hollis II and Alan Maman with additional writers listed below.

No.	Title	Writer(s)	Producer	Length
1.	"Doing My Best"	Chauncey Hollis II; Alan Maman		2:45
2.	"Business Merger"			3:38
3.	"Show Me the Way"			3:28
4.	"Mick & Cooley" (featuring Conway the Machine)	Demond Price		1:46
5.	"Ask for Me"			3:17
6.	"Ricky"			4:17
7.	"Groupie Love"			2:58
8.	"Celebration Moments" (featuring Havoc)	Kejuan Muchita		3:54
9.	"Home Improvement"			4:04
10.	"Recent Memory"			2:45
11.	"Walk in Faith"			2:44
12.	"Not Much" (featuring Boldy James)	James Jones III		4:27
13.	"Drawing Bridges" (featuring Johnathan Hullet)	Johnathan Hullet		3:08
14.	"All Gas No Breaks" (featuring Jay Worthy and Big Hit)	Jeffrey James; Chauncey Hollis Sr.	Chase N. Cashe	3:26
15.	"God is Great"			3:16
Total length:				49:53

== Personnel ==
Credits were adapted from Tidal and the album's liner notes.

- Mike Bozzi – mastering
- Andre Guirguis – assistant sound engineer
- Davis Strauss – recording, mixing
- Dave Virgile – product manager
