= Life Is Beautiful (Larry June, 2 Chainz and the Alchemist album) =

Studio album by Larry June, 2 Chainz and the Alchemist
- Released: February 7, 2025
- Genre: Hip-hop
- Length: 36.53
- Labels: ALC; The Freeminded; Empire
- Producer: The Alchemist

Larry June chronology
Doing It for Me (2024)	Life Is Beautiful (2025)	When Night Comes (2025)

2 Chainz chronology
Welcome 2 Collegrove (2023)	Life Is Beautiful (2025)

The Alchemist chronology
The Skeleton Key (2024)	Life Is Beautiful (2025)	Alfredo 2 (2025)

Singles from Life Is Beautiful
- 1. "Bad Choices" Released: January 22, 2025; 2. "I Been" Released: January 31, 2025

Life Is Beautiful is a collaborative studio album by American rappers Larry June and 2 Chainz and record producer the Alchemist. It was released on February 7, 2025, by ALC Records and Empire Distribution. Production was handled entirely by the Alchemist. It marks the second collaboration between Larry June and the Alchemist, following The Great Escape (2023), and marks 2 Chainz's first major release since departing from Def Jam after two decades with the label.

== Background and lyrics ==
"Bad Choices"
18-second sample of "Bad Choices"

Larry June and the Alchemist, who have worked together on projects in the past, enlisted Atlanta rapper 2 Chainz for the album, who is primarily known for his work in the trap subgenre. Despite their differing styles, the three artists found chemistry in their shared approach to storytelling and introspective lyricism. The Alchemist noted, "Maybe on paper the styles are kinda different, but the content is not far off."

As the three artists collaborated, the album came together organically, with initial plans for a shorter project before expanding into a full-length release. "Every joint just kept getting better. I wanted to do a five-pack, and then it was clear once we did a few of them, it was like, ‘We would be cheating them if we only gave them five," said the Alchemist.

The album explores themes of personal growth, responsibility, and the realities of success, with both 2 Chainz and Larry June reflecting on their journeys. Larry June described the project's relatability, stating, "We might talk our shit about watches, cars and shit here and there. But we also give them the real. You gotta show 'em both sides and who you really are."

2 Chainz, known for his energetic delivery on trap beats, embraced a different approach for the album. "I'm actually more comfortable rapping than doing trap music," he explained. "For the most part, I think my peers in the industry knew what I could do, but I don't think the fans knew what I could do."

The album was announced on January 31, 2025. An album trailer was released alongside the announcement, featuring footage from cities around the world and clips of the artists working together in the studio.

A deluxe edition of the album was released on August 8, 2025.

== Critical reception ==
Professional ratings
Review scores
Source	Rating
AllMusic	3.5/5 stars
Clash	8/10
Pitchfork	6.8/10

=== Accolades ===
Publication	Accolade	Rank	Ref.
Billboard	The 50 Best Albums of 2025	42	
Complex	The 50 Best Albums of 2025	32	
HotNewHipHop	The 40 Best Rap Albums Of 2025	40	

== Track listing ==
All tracks are written by Larry Hendricks, Tauheed Epps, and Alan Maman. All tracks are produced by the Alchemist.

Life Is Beautiful track listing
No.	Title	Length
1.	"Munyon Canyon"	3:43
2.	"Colossal"	3:16
3.	"I Been"	2:34
4.	"LLC"	3:18
5.	"Bad Choices"	3:02
6.	"Life Is Beautiful"	3:06
7.	"Generation"	4:16
8.	"Any Day"	3:04
9.	"Epiphany"	3:45
10.	"Tru Organics"	2:58
11.	"Jean Prouvé"	3:51
Total length:		36:53

Deluxe edition bonus tracks
No.	Title	Length
12.	"Days Like This"	3:36
13.	"Spy Hunter"	3:50
Total length:		44:19

== Personnel ==
- Larry Eugene "Larry June" Hendricks III – vocals
- Tauheed "2 Chainz" Epps – vocals
- Alan Daniel "The Alchemist" Maman – producer, vocals on "Spy Hunter"
- Nolan Presley – recording
- Finis KY White – mixing
- Nick Cavalieri – mixing
- Todd Cooper – mixing
- Joe LaPorta – mastering

== Charts ==
Chart performance for Life Is Beautiful
Chart (2025)	Peak position
US Billboard 200	89
US Top R&B/Hip-Hop Albums (Billboard)	35
US Independent Albums (Billboard)	15
