= Love It or Hate It =

Love It or Hate It or Hate It or Love It may refer to:

- "Love it or hate it", a marketing slogan for Marmite.
- "Hate It or Love It", a single by the Game
- Hate It or Love It (album), an album by Chingy
- "Love It or Hate It", a song by the Game from The Documentary III
