= 40 Nights =

- Scrapped cover art

Song by the Game and Kanye West

from the album The Documentary III
- Released: August 21, 2026
- Recorded: 2025–2026
- Length: 4:20
- Label: Numinati
- Songwriters: Jayceon Taylor; Ye; Dominique Sanders; Hassan Khaffaf; Jason Martin; Samuel Lindley; Skeez; Tommy Brown
- Producers: Ye; Buci; Tommy Brown; Traxster

"40 Nights" is a song by American rappers the Game and Kanye West from the former's eleventh studio album, The Documentary III (2026). The lead artists wrote it alongside Dominique Sanders, Hassan Khaffaf, JasonMartin, Skeez, Tommy Brown, and Traxster, with production handled by West, Buci, Brown, and Traxster. West had previously executive produced the album in February 2025, but fell out with Game two months later. Lyrically, the track finds both rappers acknowledging the controversy surrounding West's career and his antisemitic statements, with West celebrating his continued success in spite of them. "40 Nights" received mixed reception from music critics, who often criticized Game's references to West's antisemitism.

== Background and recording ==
American rapper Kanye West began working on the Game's eleventh studio album, The Documentary III (2026), in February 2025, serving as its executive producer. West was brought into the role following him gifting two custom 2025 Mercedes-Maybach S680s to Game that same month, and he had begun recording for the album by February 17. The two promoted The Documentary III with the West-produced promotional single "Tina", wherein Game raps about his attempts to become intimate with Tina Knowles. West later left his executive producer position in April 2025 after Game publicly associated with Canadian rapper Top5, who had previously threatened West; Game reached out to Top5 at the request of West, but West changed his phone number before Game could text him back.

Game and West's vocals on "40 Nights" were recorded by audio engineers Brian Sumner and Treyvonce Moore, with the latter clarifying on Instagram that he also mixed the track. In a leaked version, Game references American rapper Jay-Z and his Watch the Throne (2011) collaborative album with West, rapping: "I never got a verse from Hov, [b]ut my brother did a whole album with him".

== Composition and lyrics ==
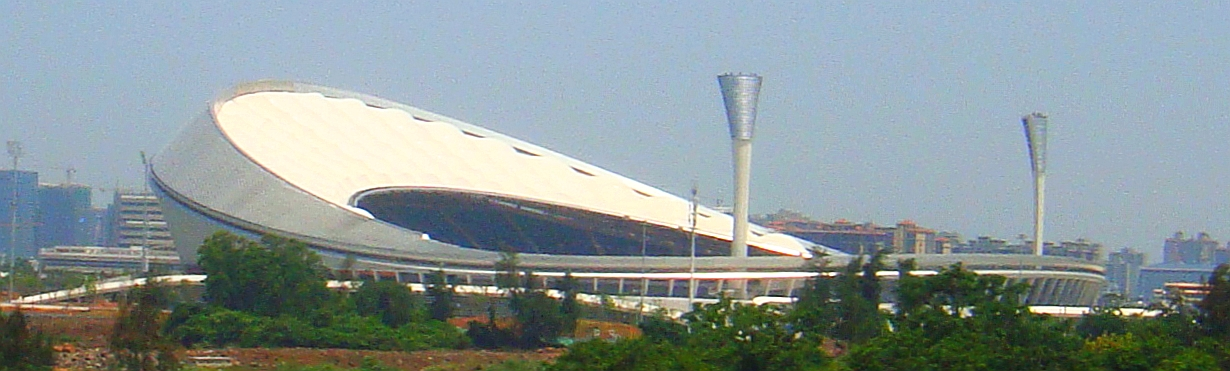
West references the commercial success of his 2024 Wuyuan River Stadium shows during the refrain of "40 Nights".

"40 Nights" was written by the Game and West alongside Dominique Sanders, Hassan Khaffaf, JasonMartin, Skeez, Tommy Brown, and Traxster. Its beat, produced by West, Buci, Tommy Brown, and Traxster, features "dusty" drums and is led by a "dramatic" sample, described by HotNewHipHop's Gabriel Nevares as adding "grandeur". Both rappers deliver verses, with Game handling the first two verses while West does the third. West also raps the refrain, where he references his public cancellation without apologizing, remarking that despite posting his "rage" to X, he was able to sell ~80,000 seats overall at his Wuyuan River Stadium listening experiences in Haikou, China in 2024.

In his second verse, Game references West's antisemitic statements from 2025 in relation to how previous comments from West caused his contract with Adidas to be terminated ("Last year, Ye said we mad at the Jews/I said, 'What that mean? We ain't gettin' no more shoes?'"). Game follows this up with clarification that he does not hate Jewish people, as he likes "most" of them, including the "half-Jewish" Canadian rapper Drake, though acknowledges he has felt sentiments similar to West's in regard to his own race. He additionally remarks that he dislikes the album cover for The Documentary III, stating he should have done the photo shoot wearing a balaclava instead.

== Release and reception ==
"40 Nights" was released as the tenth track from The Documentary III on August 21, 2026, through Numinati Records. It is one of two tracks on the album to feature West, with him also appearing on "LA Monster". Hip-hop production duo Mike & Keys were initially credited as producers and lead artists on streaming services, though their credits have since been removed.

"40 Nights" received mixed reception from music critics, often in regard to Game's second verse. In an otherwise positive review, Nevares criticized the verse as "cringey", and Quincy Dominic of RGM similarly called it "a bit weird". Complex's Joe Price argued that Game's usage of the phrase "half-Jewish" could be seen as problematic, as the description was most famously used by Nazi Germany, although he acknowledged that some Jews use the phrase themselves if they have a non-Jewish parent.
