= Tina (song) =

2025 song by the Game and Kanye West

Promotional single by the Game and Kanye West
- Released: February 25, 2025
- Recorded: February 17–24, 2025
- Length: 1:12
- Songwriters: Jayceon Terrell Taylor; Ye
- Producer: Ye

"Tina" is a song by American rappers the Game and Kanye West. It was intended to feature on the Game's eleventh studio album, The Documentary III (2026), which was executively produced by West at the time of the song's release. Produced by West, the track prominently samples the song "What's Love Got to Do with It" by Tina Turner, as well as Tina Knowles's appearance on The Jefferson Hudson Show's Spirit Tunnel.

After making multiple Instagram posts about Knowles, including a photo of the Game sending her a banana emoji, West posted the full music video for "Tina" on February 25, 2025. The video features the Game, West, and Jim Jones wearing balaclavas and high-visibility jackets while the Game raps about his attempts to become intimate with Knowles.

"Tina" received mixed reviews from music critics. While some praised West's production on the track, others harshly criticized its subject matter, finding the Game's lines towards Knowles to be off-putting. Some critics simply found the song strange, unsure if its lyricism was intentionally disrespectful. Knowles later acknowledged the song, stating she was disinterested in dating men younger than her.

== Background and promotion ==
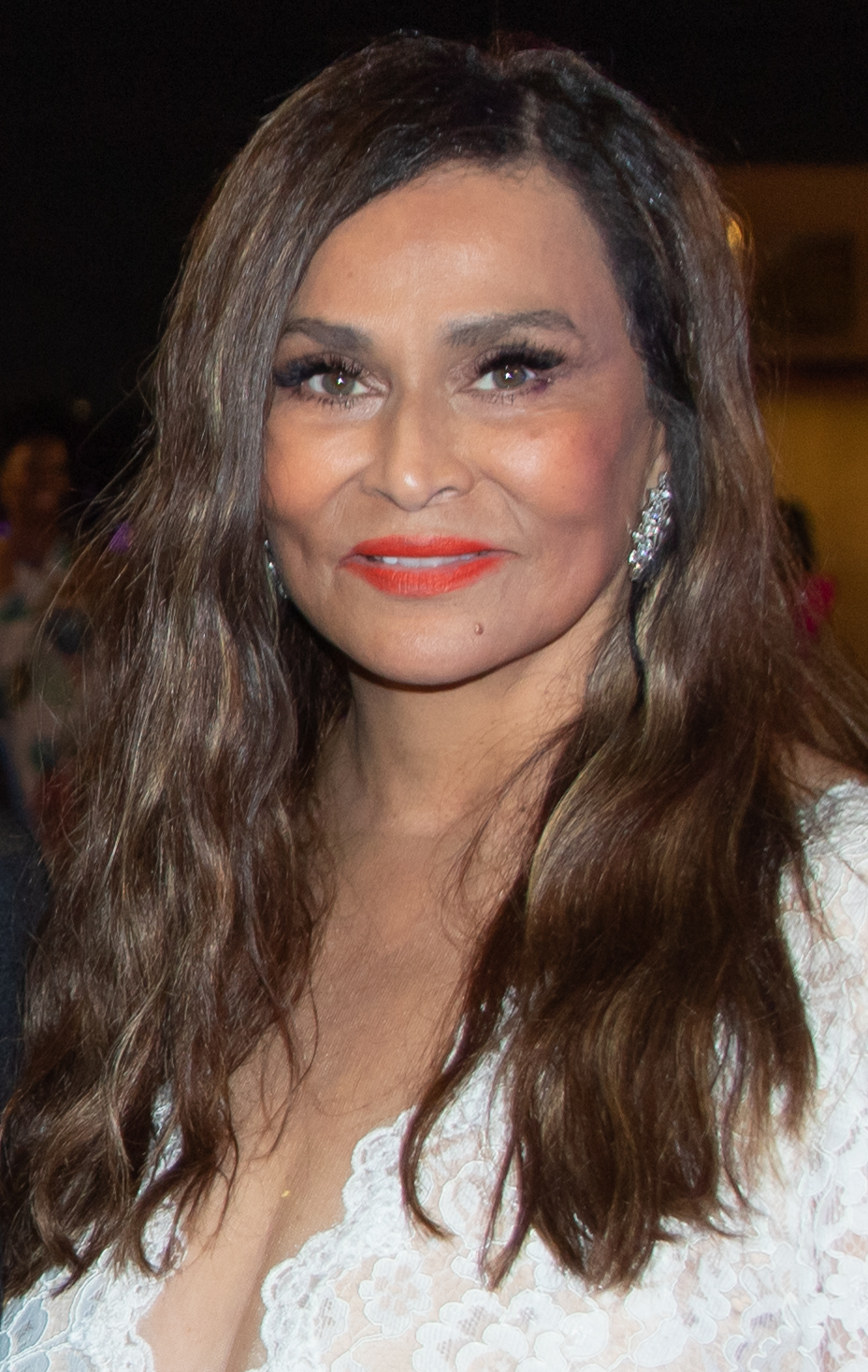
The promotion of "Tina" and its lyrics contain various taunts aimed at Tina Knowles (pictured in 2023).

On February 17, while in the middle of a rant on Twitter, Kanye West revealed that he was currently recording a feature for the Game. Promotion for the song formally began on February 24, via a series of Instagram posts made by West. He first uploaded a picture of a banana emoji, captioned with "Tear that monkey down". Afterwards, West posted a photo of an exchange between the Game and Tina Knowles, in which the Game had sent her the same emoji. West made a third post relating to Knowles before the song's release, uploading a video of her in the Spirit Tunnel with the caption "Game finna slide for the guys". The final post by West was a video of the Game recording vocals for "Tina".

== Composition ==
"Tina"
"Tina" uses a prominent sample of "What's Love Got to Do with It" by Tina Turner in its composition.

"Tina" opens with a sample of Knowles's appearance on the Spirit Tunnel, a segment on The Jennifer Hudson Show. The song itself is mainly built from samples of the Tina Turner song "What's Love Got to Do with It" (1984), which loop throughout the song. The Game opens the song with lines regarding his attempt to contact Knowles: "I see my Destiny's Child / DMing was stressing me out / Nervous, my stomach in knots / So I took a couple of shots." Multiple music publications have theorized that the use of Turner's song would negatively impact its ability to be uploaded to streaming, especially as West had been involved in multiple recent lawsuits regarding sample clearance.

== Release and reception ==
"The world is controlled by those who give no f*cks. The heartless have always waged war against those with hearts. Life is chess & this time their kings & queens are the pawns. @Ye just gave me the vibe I needed to complete #TheDocumentary3 - Game Time ♟️"

— The Game, Instagram

West uploaded the music video for "Tina" to his Instagram page on February 25, 2025, captioning the post "TINA BY GAME PRODUCED BY ME". The song was originally the meant for The Documentary III, which West was the executive producer of, but he later withdrew from the project after falling out with the Game due to the latter showing support for the Canadian rapper Top5; Top5 had allegedly threatened to kill West over comments he made online. The Game claimed that West had misinterpreted the situation, posting on Twitter that West had asked him to "reach out to him", but by the time the Game called West to say he talked to Top5, West had changed his phone number. The album was eventually released on August 21, 2026, which featured contributions from West on the tracks "40 Nights" and "LA Monster".

On the podcast Billboard Unfiltered, Billboard staff writer Kyle Denis said that West and the Game were "too old" for their stunt, adding: "45 and 47, really? It's just so desperate and so pathetic and it's so clear you want their attention and they haven't given you it in recent years." Trace Cowen of Complex said that while he was thankful that "Tina" didn't reference West's tweets regarding Nazism, he felt that "many are still left scratching their heads" in regards to the song's content. At the time of the song's release, Knowles did not make any comments regarding it. However, when approached by TMZ days later, who asked her about her reaction to "Tina", Knowles stated that she would not date anyone younger than her and is not currently seeking a relationship.

== Music video ==
The music video for "Tina" features the Game, West, and Jim Jones donning balaclavas and high-visibility jackets. Complex described the video as "impromptu, Blair Witch-esque". At the end of the music video, a fourth, unnamed individual is prompted to explain the backstory behind the song's creation. They state that the song "started off as a joke" before evolving "into the basis of [the Game's] whole album, and then before we knew it, The Documentary [III]".
