= Hold You Down (The Alchemist song) =

Single by the Alchemist featuring Prodigy, Illa Ghee and Nina Sky

from the album 1st Infantry
- Released: October 19, 2004
- Recorded: 2004
- Studio: The Lab (New York, NY)
- Genre: Hip-hop
- Length: 4:01
- Label: Koch Records
- Songwriters: Alan Maman; Albert Johnson; Gregory W. Jackson; Nicole Albino; Natalie Albino; Alan Peter Kuperschmidt
- Producer: The Alchemist

The Alchemist singles chronology
"Midnight Creep" (2003)	"Hold You Down" (2004)	"Bangers" (2004)

Nina Sky singles chronology
"Turnin' Me On" (2004)	"Hold You Down" (2004)	"Flippin' That" (2006)

Prodigy singles chronology
"Y.B.E. (Young Black Entrepreneurs)" (2000)	"Hold You Down" (2004)	"Mac 10 Handle" (2006)

Music video
- "Hold You Down" on YouTube

"Hold You Down" is a song by American hip hop musician the Alchemist featuring fellow rappers Prodigy and Illa Ghee and musical duo Nina Sky. It was released on October 19, 2004 via Koch Records as the lead single from the Alchemist's debut studio album 1st Infantry. Recording sessions took place at The Lab in New York City. Production was handled by the Alchemist himself, who utilised a sample from Al Kooper's "Love Theme". The music video was directed by Estevan Oriol.

The song peaked at number 95 on the Billboard Hot 100, number 47 on the Hot R&B/Hip-Hop Songs, number 44 on the R&B/Hip-Hop Airplay and number 17 on the Hot R&B/Hip-Hop Singles Sales in the United States.

== Track listing ==
No.	Title	Length
1.	"Hold You Down" (Clean)
2.	"Hold You Down" (Dirty)
3.	"Hold You Down" (Instrumental)

== Personnel ==
- Albert "Prodigy" Johnson – songwriter, rapping first and fourth verses
- Alan Daniel "Alchemist" Maman – songwriter, rapping second verse, producer
- Gregory "Illa Ghee" Jackson – songwriter, rapping third verse
- Nicole Albino – songwriter, singing chorus
- Natalie Albino – songwriter, singing chorus
- Jeff White – recording
- Kevin Crouse – mixing
- Alan Peter "Al Kooper" Kuperschmidt – songwriter (via sample)

== Charts ==
Chart (2004)	Peak position
US Billboard Hot 100	95
US Hot R&B/Hip-Hop Songs (Billboard)	47
US R&B/Hip-Hop Airplay (Billboard)	44
