= The Great Escape (Larry June album) =

Studio album by Larry June and the Alchemist
- Released: March 31, 2023
- Genre: Hip-hop
- Length: 45:51
- Labels: ALC; The Freeminded; Empire
- Producer: The Alchemist

Larry June chronology
| Spaceships on the Blade (2022) | The Great Escape (2023) | The Night Shift (2023) |

The Alchemist chronology
| The Elephant Man's Bones (2022) | The Great Escape (2023) | Voir Dire (2023) |

Singles from The Great Escape
- 1. "60 Days" Released: February 15, 2023; 2. "89 Earthquake" Released: March 1, 2023; 3. "Palisades, CA" Released: March 22, 2023; 4. "Porsches in Spanish" Released: March 27, 2023

The Great Escape is a collaborative studio album by American rapper Larry June and hip-hop record producer the Alchemist. It was released on March 31, 2023, through ALC Records and Empire Distribution. Production was handled entirely by the Alchemist, with Beat Butcha serving as an additional producer on one track. It features guest appearances from Action Bronson, Big Sean, Boldy James, Currensy, Evidence, Jay Worthy, Joey Badass, Slum Village, Ty Dolla Sign and Wiz Khalifa. The album peaked at number 32 on the Billboard 200, number 12 on the Top R&B/Hip-Hop Albums chart, number 9 on the Top Rap Albums chart, and number 4 on the Independent Albums chart in the United States.

Music videos were directed for "60 Days", "89 Earthquake", "Porsches in Spanish", "Solid Plan" and "Turkish Cotton".

On March 28, 2025, the album was re-released as The Great Escape (ALC Edition), featuring an extra verse on "Porsches in Spanish", a remix of "Margie's Candy House", and a bonus track, "Lunch in Tiburon".

== Background and recording ==
Larry June and the Alchemist's first collaborative project, The Great Escape, was the result of a natural and organic creative process, as detailed in their interview with Rolling Stone. The two artists, initially brought together by their mutual connection with L.A. artist Jay Worthy, found a creative synergy that evolved from working on a couple of songs to conceiving a full-length project. The process of making the album not only produced a body of work but also forged a genuine friendship between Larry June and the Alchemist. Their collaboration extended beyond the studio, with the artists traveling to Malibu and Mexico together to create and draw inspiration.

The Alchemist expressed uncertainty about collaborating with Larry June, but found inspiration after working together on Jay Worthy's "Rainy Night in SF". Larry June, in turn, admired the Alchemist's legacy in hip-hop and appreciated the opportunity to collaborate with someone he looked up to musically.

The collaborative process between Larry June and the Alchemist involved a mix of remote interactions and in-person sessions. Larry recorded the majority of the material at home, with collaborative refinements made during studio sessions. Alchemist praised Larry's recording process, highlighting his musicality and ability to contribute ideas beyond just rapping.

The album's title, The Great Escape, originated from the Alchemist's suggestion, drawing inspiration from the Robb Report and encapsulating the theme of upscale yet grounded content. To promote the album, Larry June and the Alchemist planned a comprehensive campaign, including live band shows, installations, pop-ups, and unique marketing merch.

== Critical reception ==
Professional ratings
Review scores
| Source | Rating |
|---|---|
| AllMusic | 4/5 stars |
| Clash | 8/10 |
| HipHopDX | 3.8/5 |
| laut.de | 3/5 stars |
| Pitchfork | 7.4/10 |

The Great Escape was met with generally favorable reviews from music critics.

AllMusic's Paul Simpson wrote: "June still isn't quite the most distinctive rapper in terms of subject matter or delivery, but his optimism and effortless style are endearing, and The Great Escape is easily one of his most successful projects". Shanté Collier-McDermott of Clash praised the album, saying "GRAMMY-winner talent The Alchemist didn't not disappoint, the tracks skilfully developed from top to bottom. Top shelf sampling, cool laid-back tunes and prodigious lyricism illustrate this project". Louis Pavlakos of HipHopDX stated: "whether he raps about attaching a gold piece to his Rolls Royce over a rich set of piano keys on "89 Earthquake" or buying a multi-million dollar home on "What Happened To The World", June sounds relatable and provides the blueprint for aspirational listeners looking to cling to a formula that resulted in success". Dash Lewis of Pitchfork resumed: "on their first joint album, the veteran producer's relaxed tempos and the San Francisco rapper's coolheaded flows slide together with easy fluidity".

== Track listing ==
The Great Escape track listing
| No. | Title | Writer(s) | Length |
|---|---|---|---|
| 1. | "Turkish Cotton" | Larry Eugene Hendricks; Alan Daniel Maman | 2:46 |
| 2. | "89 Earthquake" | Hendricks; Maman | 3:12 |
| 3. | "Solid Plan" (featuring Action Bronson) | Hendricks; Ariyan Arslani; Maman | 2:55 |
| 4. | "Palisades, CA" (featuring Big Sean) | Hendricks; Sean Michael Anderson; Maman | 3:14 |
| 5. | "Summer Reign" (featuring Ty Dolla Sign) | Hendricks; Tyrone William Griffin Jr.; Maman; Carl Harvey | 2:55 |
| 6. | "Orange Village" (featuring Slum Village) | Hendricks; Anthony Brown Jr.; Ralph J. Rice Jr.; Maman; Eliot Peter Phillip Dubock | 3:41 |
| 7. | "Porsches in Spanish" | Hendricks; Maman; Leo Price | 2:51 |
| 8. | "Art Talk" (featuring Boldy James) | Hendricks; James Clay Jones III; Maman | 3:17 |
| 9. | "Ocean Sounds" | Hendricks; Maman | 2:36 |
| 10. | "Left No Evidence" (featuring Evidence) | Hendricks; Michael Taylor Perretta; Maman | 3:01 |
| 11. | "What Happened to the World?" (featuring Wiz Khalifa) | Hendricks; Cameron Jibril Thomaz; Maman | 3:52 |
| 12. | "Éxito" (featuring Jay Worthy) | Hendricks; Jeffrey James Sidhoo; Maman | 2:49 |
| 13. | "60 Days" | Hendricks; Maman | 3:19 |
| 14. | "Barragán Lighting" (featuring Joey Badass and Currensy) | Hendricks; Jo-Vaughn Virginie Scott; Shante Scott Franklin; Maman | 2:32 |
| 15. | "Margie's Candy House" | Hendricks; Maman; Erasmo Carlos; Roberto Carlos | 2:51 |
| Total length: | | | 45:51 |

The Great Escape (ALC Edition) track listing
| No. | Title | Length |
|---|---|---|
| 7. | "Porsches in Spanish" (extended version) | 3:47 |
| 15. | "Margie's Candy House" (Jake One remix) | 2:43 |
| 16. | "Lunch in Tiburon" (bonus track) | 2:33 |
| Total length: | | 49:17 |

== Personnel ==
- Larry Eugene "Larry June" Hendricks III – vocals
- Ariyan "Action Bronson" Arslani – vocals (tracks 3)
- "Big Sean" Michael Anderson – vocals (tracks 4)
- Tyrone "Ty Dolla Sign" Griffin Jr. – vocals (tracks 5)
- R.L. "T3" Altman III – vocals (tracks 6)
- Ralph J. "Young RJ" Rice Jr. – vocals (tracks 6)
- James Clay "Boldy James" Jones III – vocals (track 8)
- Michael "Evidence" Perretta – vocals (track 10)
- Cameron "Wiz Khalifa" Thomaz – vocals (track 11)
- Jeffrey James "Jay Worthy" Sidhoo – vocals (track 12)
- Alan Daniel "The Alchemist" Maman – producer – vocals (track 13), producer
- Jo-Vaughn "Joey Badass" Scott – vocals (track 14)
- Shante "Currensy" Franklin – vocals (track 14)
- Eliot "Beat Butcha" Dubock – additional producer (track 6)
- Todd Cooper – mixing
- Joe LaPorta – mastering

== Charts ==
| Chart (2023) | Peak position |
|---|---|
| US Billboard 200 | 32 |
| US Top R&B/Hip-Hop Albums (Billboard) | 12 |
| US Top Rap Albums (Billboard) | 9 |
| US Independent Albums (Billboard) | 4 |
