= Lndn Drgs =

Canadian music duo

- Origin: Vancouver & Compton
- Genres: Hip-hop; gangsta rap; G-funk
- Years active: 2013–present
- Labels: GDF Records; Griselda (Jay Worthy's management); Empire Distribution
- Members: Jay Worthy; Sean House
- Website: lndndrgs.com

Lndn Drgs (stylized in all caps, disemvoweling of "London Drugs") is a Canadian-American hip hop duo made up of Jay Worthy and producer Sean House. As of 2025, they have been primarily releasing projects through their GDF Records imprint.

== History ==
Rapper Jay Worthy and producer Sean House began working on music in the early 2010’s for Jay Worthy’s 2012 mixtape The Lifestyle hosted by DJ Mustard. They continued making new music together through 2013-2014, leading to the formation of Lndn Drgs as a group. Mentored by the late A$AP YAMS, they released the EP’s: Lndn Drgs EP, ‘'Burnout EP and their debut full-length album Aktive in 2015 on Fool's Gold Records.

In 2016 Lndn Drgs released the follow up EP Burnout 2 EP on Fool's Gold Records. Between 2017-2019 Lndn Drgs released collaborative EP’s with rappers Curren$y, Left Brain, and producers The Alchemist, A$AP P On The Boards and King Most. In 2018 the group released the third installment of the Burnout series Burnout 3 EP and a deluxe version of their debut album Aktive featuring 9 new songs.

In September 27th, 2019 the duo released their second full length project Affiliated, a compilation album with each song featuring a different artist. In December 11th, 2020 Lndn Drgs dropped the full-length album Burnout 4. On March 25th, 2022 Lndn Drgs teamed up with rapper Larry June to release the joint album 2 P'z In A Pod. On March 8th, 2024 Lndn Drgs released Affiliated 2 the follow up to 2019’s compilation album Affiliated. On May 23rd, 2025 Lndn Drgs released the fifth entry of the Burnout series Burnout 5 EP.

== Discography ==
=== Albums ===
- Lndn Drgs EP (2015)
- Burnout EP (2015)
- Aktive (2015)
- Burnout 2 EP (2016)
- Aktive (Instrumentals) (2016)
- P On the DRGS EP (with P On The Boards) (2017)
- Aktive Deluxe (2018)
- Burnout 3 EP (2018)
- Brain On Drgs (with Left Brain) (2018)
- Umbrella Symphony EP (with Currensy) (2019)
- Affiliated (2019)
- Burnout 4 (2020)
- 2 P'z In A Pod (with Larry June) (2022)
- Affiliated 2 (2024)
- Burnout 5 EP (2025)
- Generation P (with George Clinton) (2026)

=== Singles ===
Title	Year	Album
"The Time Is Now" (featuring Da$h)	2013	Non-album singles
"I Do This" (featuring Alexander Spit)	2013	Non-album singles
"Harvey Keitel"	2014	Non-album singles
"Pimp God"	2014	Non-album singles
"Feel" (featuring Chuck Inglish)	2014	Non-album singles
"On Mamas (Original Version)" (featuring Da$h)	2014	Non-album singles
"Uza Trikk" (featuring A$AP Yams, G-Perico and Earl Swavey of Kioe Boyz)	2014	Non-album singles
"The Meaning of Life" (featuring Mike G and Kashflow Da God)	2014	Non-album singles
"Nineteen" (featuring YG Hootie)	2015	Non-album singles
"Dope Sick" (featuring Sha Hef)	2016	Non-album singles
"Blue Hundreds"	2016	Non-album singles
"Do You Wrong"	2017	Non-album singles
"Hop Out (Remix)" (featuring Curren$y)	2018	Non-album singles
"Tomorrow" (featuring Freddie Gibbs)	2018	Non-album singles
"Feel Alright"	2018	Non-album singles
"Sake (Original Version)" (with Curren$y)	2019	Non-album singles
"Payback" (with Curren$y)	2019	Non-album singles
"All About U" (featuring Problem)	2019	Non-album singles
"Sideshow" (featuring Conway the Machine)	2019	Non-album singles
"Town Bidness" (featuring Casey Veggies)	2019	Non-album singles
"Leave It Up to Me" (with Larry June)	2022	Non-album singles
"Summer Madness (Freestyle)"	2023	Non-album singles
"Waffle House" (featuring Stalley)	2024	Non-album singles
"Real Original" (featuring Domo Genesis)	2024	Non-album singles
"Amalfi Drive" (featuring Leven Kali and Compton's Most Wanted)	2024	Non-album singles
"I Wish"	2025	Non-album singles
"Choosing Shoes" (featuring Boldy James)	2025	Non-album singles
"Reckless"	2025	Non-album singles
"Sake" (featuring Curren$y)	2025	Non-album singles
"2P'z" (featuring Larry June)	2025	Non-album singles
"Atomic P" (with George Clinton)	2026	Non-album singles
"Knee Deep" (with George Clinton featuring Snoop Dogg)	2026	Non-album singles
"P of the Week" (with George Clinton featuring Larry June)	2026	Non-album singles
