= The Alchemist's Cookbook =

EP by the Alchemist
- Released: November 18, 2008
- Recorded: 2007–08
- Genre: Hip-hop
- Label: Koch
- Producer: The Alchemist

The Alchemist chronology
The Cutting Room Floor 2 (2008)	The Alchemist's Cookbook (2008)	Chemical Warfare (2009)

Professional ratings
Review scores
Source	Rating
HipHopDX	3.5/5

The Alchemist's Cookbook is the first extended play by American hip-hop musician the Alchemist. It was released digitally via iTunes on November 18, 2008, through Koch Records. Produced entirely by the Alchemist himself, it features guest appearances from Evidence, Prodigy, Blu, Capone-N-Noreaga, Jadakiss, Keak da Sneak, Kid Cudi, Nina Sky, Pusha T, Snoop Dogg and Styles P. The six-track EP's title was inspired by the 1971 book The Anarchist Cookbook.

== Background ==
The EP serves as a build-up to the Alchemist's second full-length studio album Chemical Warfare. "Keys to the City" was the first promotional single from the project, released in 2007. The song "Calmly Smoke" previously appeared on the 2008 mixtape The Cutting Room Floor 2. The song "Lose Your Life" was released as the second promotional single from the EP with an accompanying animated music video co-created by Devin Flynn. "Lose Your Life" and "Therapy" ended up included in the final tracklist of Chemical Warfare.

== Track listing ==
The Alchemist's Cookbook track listing
No.	Title	Length
1.	"Key to the City" (featuring Nina Sky and Prodigy)	3:48
2.	"Lose Your Life" (featuring Jadakiss, Snoop Dogg and Pusha T)	3:33
3.	"Follow the Dollar" (featuring Capone-N-Noreaga)	3:20
4.	"Calmly Smoke" (featuring Styles P and Evidence)	3:54
5.	"Therapy" (featuring Blu, Evidence and KiD CuDi)	3:09
6.	"Al Capone Zone" (featuring Prodigy and Keak da Sneak)	2:47

== Personnel ==
- Daniel Alan "The Alchemist" Maman – vocals, producer, recording (tracks: 1–2, 4–6)
- Natalie Albino – vocals (track 1)
- Nicole Albino – vocals (track 1)
- Albert "Prodigy" Johnson – vocals (tracks: 1, 6)
- Jason "Jadakiss" Phillips – vocals (track 2)
- Calvin "Snoop Dogg" Broadus – vocals (track 2)
- Terrence "Pusha T" Thornton – vocals (track 2)
- Kiam "Capone" Holley – vocals (track 3)
- Victor "N.O.R.E." Santiago – vocals (track 3)
- David "Styles P" Styles – vocals (track 4)
- Michael "Evidence" Perretta – vocals (tracks: 4, 5)
- Johnson "Blu" Barnes III – vocals (track 5)
- Scott "KiD CuDi" Mescudi – vocals (track 5)
- Charles "Keak da Sneak" Bowens-Williams – vocals (track 6)
- Christian "Hazardis Soundz" Rodriguez – recording & mixing (track 3)
- Kevin Crouse – mixing (tracks: 1–2, 4–5)
- Eddie Sancho – mixing (track 6)
