= 1st Infantry (album) =

Studio album by the Alchemist
- Released: September 21, 2004
- Recorded: 2003–04
- Studios: The Lab (New York, NY); Baseclef Studios (Queens, NY); Soundproof (Los Angeles, CA); D-Block Studios (Yonkers, NY); MGS Sound Lab (Los Angeles, CA); Infamous Studios (Queens, NY)
- Genre: Hip-hop
- Length: 1:05:07
- Labels: ALC; Goliath; Koch
- Producer: The Alchemist

The Alchemist chronology
Insomnia (2003)	1st Infantry (2004)	The Chemistry Files (2006)

Singles from 1st Infantry
- 1. "Hold You Down" Released: May 18, 2004

Professional ratings
Review scores
Source	Rating
AllMusic	4/5 stars
HipHopDX	4/5
IGN	8.4/10
Now	4/5
PopMatters	7/10
RapReviews	7.5/10
Stylus Magazine	B−
Tiny Mix Tapes	3.5/5 marks

1st Infantry is the debut solo studio album by American hip-hop producer and rapper the Alchemist. It was released on September 21, 2004, through his label ALC Records and Koch Records. Recording sessions took place at The Lab, Baseclef Studios and Infamous Studios in New York City, at Soundproof and MGS Sound Lab in Los Angeles, and at D-Block Studios in Yonkers. Production was handled entirely by the Alchemist, who also served as executive producer together with his brother Neil Maman, with Prodigy serving as co-executive producer. It features guest appearances from the Lox, Mobb Deep, Big Noyd, Big Twins, B-Real, Chinky, Devin the Dude, Dilated Peoples, Illa Ghee, Lloyd Banks, M.O.P., Nas, Nina Sky, PSC, Stat Quo and the Game.

The album peaked at number 101 on the Billboard 200, number 11 on the Top R&B/Hip-Hop Albums, number 6 on the Top Rap Albums, number 8 on the Independent Albums, and topped the Heatseekers Albums chart in the United States. It also reached number 43 on the UK Independent Albums chart. The album's instrumental version and deluxe edition with a bonus DVD were released on October 4, 2005.

One single from the album, "Hold You Down", peaked at No. 95 on the Billboard Hot 100 and No. 47 on the Hot R&B/Hip-Hop Songs chart in the US. The song "Bangers" appeared in the 2006 video game Saints Row.

== Track listing ==
All tracks are produced by the Alchemist.

No.	Title	Writer(s)	Length
1.	"Intro"		0:56
2.	"Dead Bodies" (featuring the Game and Prodigy)	Alan Maman; Jayceon Taylor; Albert Johnson	4:20
3.	"Your Boy Al" (Interlude)		0:47
4.	"The Essence" (featuring the Lox)	Maman; David Styles; Jason Phillips; Sean Jacobs	4:43
5.	"Hold You Down" (featuring Prodigy, Nina Sky and Illa Ghee)	Maman; Johnson; Natalie Albino; Nicole Albino; Gregory Jackson; Alan Peter Kuperschmidt	3:57
6.	"Industry Rule 4080 (Interlude)" (featuring Riggs)		1:57
7.	"Stop the Show" (featuring Stat Quo and M.O.P.)	Maman; Stanley Benton; Eric Murray; Jamal Grinnage	2:45
8.	"D Block to QB" (featuring Havoc, Big Noyd, Styles P and J-Hood)	Maman; Kejuan Muchita; Tajuan Perry; Styles; Joshua Hood	4:03
9.	"Bangers" (featuring Lloyd Banks)	Maman; Christopher Lloyd	3:44
10.	"Where Can We Go" (featuring Devin the Dude)	Maman; Devin Copeland	4:31
11.	"It's a Craze" (featuring Mobb Deep)	Maman; Johnson; Muchita	4:03
12.	"For the Record" (featuring Dilated Peoples)	Maman; Michael Perretta; Rakaa Taylor; Chris Oroc	3:47
13.	"Boost the Crime Rate" (featuring J-Hood and Sheek Louch)	Maman; Hood; Jacobs	5:24
14.	"Strength of Pain" (featuring Chinky)	Maman; Shalene Evans; Jay Hoggard; Mauro Malavasi	4:02
15.	"A Soul Assassin's Tale (Interlude)" (featuring DJ Muggs)		1:35
16.	"Bang Out" (featuring B-Real)	Maman; Louis Freese; Arthur Reynolds	3:30
17.	"Tick Tock" (featuring Nas and Prodigy)	Maman; Nasir Jones; Johnson	3:57
18.	"Pimp Squad" (featuring P$C)	Maman; Clifford Harris; Nathaniel Josey; Sean Merrett; Akeem Lawal	3:05
19.	"Different Worlds" (featuring Twin Gambino)	Maman; Jamal Abdul Raheem	3:57
Total length:			1:05:07

== Personnel ==
- Alan "The Alchemist" Maman – producer, executive producer, sleeve notes
- Albert "Prodigy" Johnson – performer (tracks: 2, 5, 11, 17), co-executive producer
- Jayceon "The Game" Taylor – performer (track 2)
- David "Styles P" Styles – performer (tracks: 4, 8)
- Sean "Sheek Louch" Jacobs – performer (tracks: 4, 13)
- Jason "Jadakiss" Phillips – performer (track 4)
- Gregory "Illa Ghee" Jackson – performer (track 5)
- Natalie Albino – performer (track 5)
- Nicole Albino – performer (track 5)
- Rigo "Riggs" Morales – performer (track 6), A&R direction
- Stanley "Stat Quo" Benton – performer (track 7)
- Eric "Billy Danze" Murray – performer (track 7)
- Jamal "Lil' Fame" Grinnage – performer (track 7)
- Kejuan "Havoc" Muchita – performer (tracks: 8, 11)
- Joshua "J Hood" Hood – performer (tracks: 8, 13)
- Terance "Big Noyd" Perry – performer (track 8)
- Christopher "Lloyd Banks" Lloyd – performer (track 9)
- Devin "Devin the Dude" Copeland – performer (track 10)
- Michael "Evidence" Perretta – performer & recording (track 12), mastering
- Rakaa "Iriscience" Taylor – performer (track 12)
- Chris "DJ Babu" Oroc – performer (track 12)
- Shalene "Chinky" Evans – performer (track 14)
- Louis "B-Real" Freese – performer (track 16)
- Nasir "Nas" Jones – performer (track 17)
- Clifford "T.I." Harris – performer (track 18)
- Nathaniel "Mac Boney" Josey – performer (track 18)
- Sean "Big Kuntry King" Merrett – performer (track 18)
- Akeem "AK tha Razor Man" Lawal – performer (track 18)
- Jamal "Big Twins"/"Twin Gambino" Abdulraheem – performer (track 19)
- Richard "Segal" Huredia – mixing (tracks: 2, 10, 11)
- Kevin Crouse – mixing (tracks: 4, 5, 7, 9, 12, 17–19)
- Jeff White – recording (tracks: 5, 7–11, 14, 18, 19), A&R administrator, product manager
- Steve Sola – mixing (tracks: 8, 14)
- Ken "Duro" Ifill – mixing (track 13)
- Rob Hill – recording & mixing (track 16)
- Bernie Grundman – mastering
- Neil Maman – executive producer, A&R administrator, management
- Ronald "Gotti" Odum – production coordinator
- Damian Davis – production assistant
- Ola Kudu – art direction, design, additional photography
- Fubz – photography
- Gerard Rechnitzer – additional photography
- Paul Rosenberg – management
- Tracy McNew – management
- Theo Sedlmayr – legal
- Lena Kasambalides – legal
- Bonsu Thompson – marketing
- Amanda Silverman – publicist
- Bianca Bianconi – publicist

== Charts ==
Chart (2004)	Peak position
French Albums (SNEP)	159
UK Independent Albums (Official Charts)	43
US Billboard 200	101
US Top R&B/Hip-Hop Albums (Billboard)	11
US Top Rap Albums (Billboard)	6
US Independent Albums (Billboard)	8
US Heatseekers Albums (Billboard)	1
