= Chemical Warfare (The Alchemist album) =

Studio album by Alchemist
- Released: July 7, 2009
- Recorded: 2006–2009
- Genre: Hip-hop
- Length: 55:29
- Labels: ALC; E1
- Producer: Alchemist

Alchemist chronology
1st Infantry (2004)	Chemical Warfare (2009)	Russian Roulette (2012)

Singles from Chemical Warfare
- 1. "Smile" Released: May 5, 2009

Chemical Warfare is the second solo studio album by American hip-hop producer and recording artist the Alchemist. It was released on July 7, 2009, via ALC Records and E1 Music. Produced entirely by the Alchemist himself, it features guest appearances from Blu, Eminem, Evidence, Fabolous, Jadakiss, Juvenile, Kid Cudi, Kool G Rap, KRS-One, Kxng Crooked, Lil' Fame, Maxwell, Oh No, Prodigy, Pusha T, Roc C, Snoop Dogg, Talib Kweli, Tha Dogg Pound, The Lady of Rage, Three 6 Mafia and Twista.

The album debuted at number 63 on the Billboard 200, number 13 on the Top R&B/Hip-Hop Albums, number 4 on the Top Rap Albums, number 6 on the Independent Albums charts in the United States. Its lead single "Smile" was released on May 5, 2009, with an accompanying music video was directed by Jason Goldwatch. Songs "Lose Your Life" and "Therapy" previously appeared on The Alchemist's Cookbook EP.

== Background ==
The back cover of the Alchemist's promotional single "Keys to the City", released in 2007, mentioned a new album, expected to be in-stores in early 2008. On his 2008 mixtape The Cutting Room Floor 2, the Alchemist revealed that the album titled Chemical Warfare is scheduled to be released in Summer 2008. In the closing credits of the animated music video for the song "Lose Your Life" it was stated that the album would be released in February 2009. In May 2009, the full track listing was revealed with the release set for July 7, 2009.

== Critical reception ==
Professional ratings
Aggregate scores
Source	Rating
Metacritic	83/100
Review scores
Source	Rating
AllMusic	4/5 stars
HipHopDX	3.5/5
laut.de	3/5 stars
Pitchfork	7.8/10
RapReviews	8.5/10
XXL	3/5 (L)

Chemical Warfare was met with generally favourable reviews from music critics. At Metacritic, which assigns a normalized rating out of 100 to reviews from mainstream publications, the album received an average score of 83 based on four reviews.

Steve 'Flash' Juon of RapReviews praised the work, saying "it may be that the only constant on Chemical Warfare IS Alchemist's beats, but that's enough to make it work--and like the futuristic battle it implies the album is filled with hits you'll never see coming". AllMusic's Jeffries found the album "keeps this capo's reputation intact. Recommended for aspiring dons and more open-minded thugs". David Drake of Pitchfork stated: "Chemical Warfare is a rap version of Speilberg's Minority Report; it draws upon a gritty underground past while embracing more modern craftsmanship, where new smooth edges are balanced by the felt-authenticity of its caliginous vision".

== Track listing ==
No.	Title	Writer(s)	Length
1.	"Intro"	Alan Maman	0:58
2.	"ALC Theme" (with Kool G Rap)	Maman; Nathaniel Wilson	3:49
3.	"Lose Your Life" (with Snoop Dogg, Jadakiss and Pusha T)	Maman; Calvin Broadus; Jason Phillips; Terrence Thornton	4:28
4.	"Chemical Warfare" (with Eminem)	Maman; Marshall Mathers	1:33
5.	"Grand Concourse Benches" (with KRS-One)	Maman; Lawrence Parker	5:22
6.	"Therapy" (with Evidence, Blu, Talib Kweli and KiD CuDi)	Maman; Michael Perretta; Johnson Barnes; Talib Kweli Greene; Scott Mescudi	5:22
7.	"That'll Work" (with Three 6 Mafia and Juvenile)	Maman; Paul Beauregard; Jordan Houston; Terius Gray	5:00
8.	"Smile" (with Maxwell and Twista)	Maman; Gerald Maxwell Rivera; Carl Mitchell	4:43
9.	"Keep the Heels On" (with Prodigy)	Maman; Albert Johnson	3:45
10.	"Acts of Violence" (Gangrene with Roc 'C' and Crooked I)	Maman; Michael Jackson; Damien Smith; Dominic Wickliffe	5:22
11.	"Lights, Cameras, Action" (with Lil' Fame)	Maman; Jamal Grinnage	1:39
12.	"Some Gangster Shit" (with Fabolous)	Maman; John Jackson	2:00
13.	"On Sight" (with Tha Dogg Pound and The Lady of Rage)	Maman; Delmar Arnaud; Ricardo Brown; Robin Allen	3:46
14.	"Take a Look Back"	Maman	5:29

Bonus track
No.	Title	Writer(s)	Producer(s)	Length
15.	"Under Siege" (performed by Gangrene)	Maman; M. Jackson	Oh No	2:13
Total length:				55:29

Digital bonus tracks
No.	Title	Length
16.	"Lose Your Life" (Instrumental)	3:26
17.	"Chemical Warfare" (Instrumental)	1:26
18.	"That'll Work" (Instrumental)	4:19

== Personnel ==
- Daniel Alan "The Alchemist" Maman – vocals, producer (tracks: 1–14), recording (tracks: 1–3, 5–15), mixing (track 6), sleeve notes
- Nathaniel "Kool G Rap" Wilson – vocals (track 2)
- Calvin "Snoop Dogg" Broadus – vocals (track 3)
- Jason "Jadakiss" Phillips – vocals (track 3)
- Terrence "Pusha T" Thornton – vocals (track 3)
- Marshall "Eminem" Mathers – vocals (track 4)
- Lawrence "KRS-One" Parker – vocals (track 5)
- Michael "Evidence" Perretta – vocals (track 6)
- Johnson "Blu" Barnes III – vocals (track 6)
- Talib Kweli – vocals (track 6)
- Scott "KiD CuDi" Mescudi – vocals (track 6)
- Paul "DJ Paul" Beauregard – vocals (track 7)
- Jordan "Juicy J" Houston – vocals (track 7)
- Terius "Juvenile" Gray – vocals (track 7)
- Gerald Maxwell Rivera – vocals (track 8)
- Carl "Twista" Mitchell – vocals (track 8)
- Eric Johnson – bass (track 8)
- Albert "Prodigy" Johnson – vocals (track 9)
- Michael "Oh No" Jackson – vocals (tracks: 10, 15), producer (track 15)
- Damien "Roc C" Smith – vocals (track 10)
- Dominic "Crooked I" Wickliffe – vocals (track 10)
- Jamal "Lil' Fame" Grinnage – vocals (track 11)
- John "Fabolous" Jackson – vocals (track 12)
- Delmar "Daz Dillinger" Arnaud – vocals (track 13)
- Ricardo "Kurupt" Brown – vocals (track 13)
- Robin "The Lady of Rage" Allen – vocals (track 13)
- Ming – additional vocals (track 13)
- Mike Strange – recording (track 4)
- Eddie Sancho – mixing (tracks: 2, 13)
- Kevin Crouse – mixing (tracks: 3–5, 7–12, 14)
- Romeo "DJ Romes" Jimenez – scratches & mixing (track 15)
- Arnold Mischkulnig – mastering
- Neil Maman – executive producer, management
- Paul Grosso – design, creative director
- Chad Griffith – photography
- Michael Greene – A&R
- Stephen Hacker – A&R
- Tiffany R. Almy – legal

== Charts ==
Chart (2009)	Peak position
US Billboard 200	63
US Top R&B/Hip-Hop Albums (Billboard)	13
US Top Rap Albums (Billboard)	4
US Independent Albums (Billboard)	6
