= Israeli Salad (album) =

Studio album by the Alchemist
- Released: May 26, 2015
- Genre: Hip-hop; instrumental
- Length: 37:48
- Label: ALC
- Producer: The Alchemist

The Alchemist chronology
Welcome to Los Santos (With Oh No) (2015)	Israeli Salad (2015)	Retarded Alligator Beats (2015)

Israeli Salad is the first instrumental studio album by producer and musician the Alchemist. The album is a concept album, based almost entirely on Israeli samples. The album was produced entirely by the Alchemist, and was released through his own ALC Records on May 26, 2015.

== Background ==
The Alchemist's father is an Israeli businessman. After record shopping in Israel while visiting there, in a 2012 Billboard interview, Alchemist stated that he planned on creating an instrumental album with all Israeli samples. The project really developed much later, and he announced it in late March 2015.

Like other albums by The Alchemist, Israeli Salad is an instrumental hip-hop album consisting of beats and audio collages. The album has many samples and recordings in Hebrew; additionally some of the song names contain Hebrew phrases (eg. "Shalom Alechem", "Chetzi") and Israeli cultural references. Some of the beats in the album were used before on songs produced by The Alchemist. For example, "The Type" was the beat of a song of the same title, featuring Prodigy on Curren$y and Alchemist's album Covert Coup, "Bold" was on Boldy James and Alchemist's album My 1st Chemistry Set, and more.

== Track listing ==
All songs were produced, arranged and mixed by The Alchemist.

No.	Title	Length
1.	"Arrival"	1:35
2.	"Bone Thugs N' Haifa"	1:50
3.	"Collage Pt. 1: Sunrise"	1:10
4.	"Collage Pt. 2: Popeye The Pimp"	1:12
5.	"Collage Pt. 3: Rush Hour"	1:19
6.	"Collage Pt. 4: Sunset"	2:22
7.	"Chetzi"	2:58
8.	"The Type"	3:02
9.	"Turn This Sh*t Up Pt. 1"	2:24
10.	"Turn This Sh*t Up Pt. 2"	2:03
11.	"Za'atar Smoke"	2:46
12.	"Shalom Alechem"	2:19
13.	"Matzik"	0:49
14.	"Yala Yala"	1:52
15.	"Meduza"	1:13
16.	"Listen To Yitzhak"	1:05
17.	"Bold"	2:27
18.	"Tunnel Rat"	1:52
19.	"Yehudi El Yehudi"	1:31
20.	"Departure"	1:59
Total length:		37:48
