= Jay Worthy =

Canadian-American rapper

- Also known as: P Worthy; Street Legend; Rap's Forrest Gump
- Born: Jeffrey James Worthy; January 14, 1986 (age 40); Vancouver, Canada
- Origin: Compton, California, U.S.
- Genres: West Coast hip-hop; Gangsta rap; G-Funk
- Occupations: Rapper; Songwriter; Record producer
- Years active: 2013-present
- Labels: GDF Records; Griselda Records; Empire Distribution
- Member of: LNDN DRGS

Jeffrey James Worthy (born January 14, 1986), better known by his shortened name Jay Worthy or his nickname P Worthy, is a Canadian-American rapper and record producer from Vancouver and Compton, California. He is known for his relaxed, smooth-talking street narratives and his unique fusion of West Coast street rap with late '70s and early '80s R&B, soul, and G-Funk. He is also widely known in pop culture as the stepbrother of the alternative pop artist Grimes.

== Early life ==
Born in Vancouver, Worthy spent much of his early childhood there, frequently visiting family in California before moving permanently. He has noted that he was "off the porch" at a young age in Vancouver before a series of circumstances and a dispersed crew made staying there unsafe. In Compton, he was "off the porch" early, living a gritty street-level life in the neighborhood and building foundational ties with local figures. He was notably roommates with Big Fase 100 (The Game's brother, tied to Compton's Cedar Block Piru set), and navigated the same local ecosystem that raised future West Coast mainstays like Westside Boogie, YG Hootie, and Problem. When Worthy officially moved to Compton, he became a member to the West Side Piru Bloods.

== Musical style and influences ==
While he stays deeply rooted in traditional West Coast hip-hop culture, his approach subverts typical modern production by bypassing heavy, hard-hitting trap drums in favor of organic grooves, guitar riffs, and piano loops. He is influenced by rappers like Ice Cube, Spice 1, MC Eiht, Tha Dogg Pound, Project Blowed, DJ Quik, Snoop Dogg, Ice-T, Eazy-E, and X-Raided. His street legitimacy and deep ties allowed him to move fluidly through LA's red and blue divides, later famously teaming up with G Perico (a Crip) and producer Cardo to conceptualize G-Worthy as a modern-day Westside Connection ("one rapper from the red side, one from the blue").

== Discography ==
=== Studio albums ===
- Once Upon A Time (2022)
- Once Upon A Time 2 (2022)

=== EPs ===
- Two4one (2020)
- Two4two (2021)
- ST LGND 94 (2021)
- Tokyo Drift (2023)

=== Collaborative albums ===
- The Lifestyle (2012) (Hosted By DJ Mustard)
- LNDN DRGS (2015) (with Sean House, as LNDN DRGS)
- Aktive (2015) (with Sean House, as LNDN DRGS)
- Burnout (2015) (with Sean House, as LNDN DRGS)
- Burnout 2 (2016) (with Sean House, as LNDN DRGS)
- Aktive Instrumentals (2016) (with Sean House, as LNDN DRGS)
- G-Worthy (2017) (with G-Perico & Cardo Got Wings, as G-Worthy)
- P On The Drugs (2017) (with P On The Boards & Sean House, as LNDN DRGS)
- Fantasy Island (2017) (with The Alchemist)
- The Tonite Show with Jay Worthy & Mitchy Slick (2018) (with Mitchy Slick & DJ Fresh)
- Westside Party (2018) (with King Most)
- Aktive Deluxe (2018) (with Sean House, as LNDN DRGS)
- Burnout 3 (2018) (with Sean House, as LNDN DRGS)
- Brain On DRGS (2018) (with Left Brain & Sean House, as LNDN DRGS)
- Umbrella Symphony (2019) (with Curren$y & Sean House, as LNDN DRGS)
- Affiliated (2019) (with Sean House, as LNDN DRGS)
- Eat When You're Hungry Sleep When You're Tired (2020) (with Harry Fraud)
- Till The Morning (2020) (with Shlohmo)
- Burnout 4 (2020) (with Sean House, as LNDN DRGS)
- The Ballad Of A Dopehead (2021) (with T.F. & Budgie)
- No Sleep For The Wicked (2021) (with Sha Hef)
- The Tonite Show (Instrumentals) with Jay Worthy & Mitchy Slick (2022) (with Mitchy Slick & DJ Fresh)
- 2 P’z In A Pod (2022) (with Larry June & Sean House, as LNDN DRGS)
- You Take The Credit, We'll Take The Check (2022) (with Harry Fraud)
- What They Hittin’ 4 (2022) (with DJ Muggs)
- Nothing Bigger Than The Program (2023) (with Roc Marciano)
- THE AM3RICAN DREAM (2023) (with Kamaiyah & Harry Fraud)
- Bootlegs & B-Sides (2023) (with Meet The Whoops)
- Affiliated 2 (2024) (with Sean House, as LNDN DRGS)
- Magic Hour (2024) (with DāM-FunK)
- Time After Time (2024) (with MadeinTYO)
- The Tonite Show (Part 2) with Jay Worthy (2024) (with DJ Fresh)
- The Ballad Of A Dopehead Instrumentals (2025) (with T.F. & Budgie)
- Burnout 5 (2025) (with Sean House, as LNDN DRGS)
- Generation P (2026) (with George Clinton & Sean House, as LNDN DRGS)

=== Compilation albums ===
- Once Upon A Time: The Soundtrack (2026)

=== Singles ===
- Jay Worthy & LNDN DRGS - The Time Is Now (featuring Da$h) (2013)
- Jay Worthy & LNDN DRGS - I Do This (featuring Alexander Spit) (2013)
- Jay Worthy & LNDN DRGS - Harvey Keitel (2014)
- Jay Worthy & LNDN DRGS - Pimp God (2014)
- Jay Worthy & LNDN DRGS - Feel (featuring Chuck English) (2014)
- Jay Worthy & LNDN DRGS - On Mamas (Original Version) (featuring Da$h) (2014)
- Jay Worthy & LNDN DRGS - Uza Trikk (featuring A$AP Yams, G-Perico, & Earl Swavey from Kioe Boyz) (2014)
- Jay Worthy & LNDN DRGS - The Meaning Of Life (featuring Mike G & Kashflow Da God) (2014)
- Jay Worthy & LNDN DRGS - Nineteen (featuring YG Hootie) (2015)
- Jay Worthy - Won’t Holler (Original Version) (featuring Payroll Giovanni, Jay 305, & Freeway Rick Ross) (2015)
- Jay Worthy & LNDN DRGS - Dope Sick (featuring Sha Hef) (2016)
- Jay Worthy & LNDN DRGS - Blue Hundreds (2016)
- Jay Worthy - On Sight (featuring Larry June) (2016)
- G-Worthy & Cardo Got Wings - Never Miss (with G-Perico) (2017)
- G-Worthy & Cardo Got Wings - Ain’t Trippin’ (with G-Perico) (2017)
- Jay Worthy & The Alchemist - Stepping Out (featuring Sha Hef) (2017)
- Jay Worthy & The Alchemist - Boomerang (featuring Polo100 & Big Body Bes) (2017)
- Jay Worthy & The Alchemist - Rising Sun (featuring Ru Gotti) (2017)
- Jay Worthy & The Alchemist - Four Fifteens (featuring Meyhem Lauren & Big Body Bes) (2017)
- Jay Worthy & LNDN DRGS - Do You Wrong (2017)
- Jay Worthy - Really Livin’ (2017)
- Jay Worthy & Mitchy Slick & DJ.Fresh - Drakko (2018)
- Jay Worthy & Mitchy Slick & DJ.Fresh - Cortez (2018)
- Jay Worthy & LNDN DRGS - Hop Out (Remix) (featuring Curren$y) (2018)
- Jay Worthy & LNDN DRGS - Tomorrow (featuring Freddie Gibbs) (2018)
- Jay Worthy & LNDN DRGS - Feel Alright (2018)
- Jay Worthy - October (featuring Smoke DZA) (2018)
- Jay Worthy & LNDN DRGS & Curren$y - Sake (Original Version) (2019)
- Jay Worthy & LNDN DRGS & Curren$y - Payback (2019)
- Jay Worthy & Cardo Got Wings - Love Letter (featuring Rucci) (2019)
- Jay Worthy & LNDN DRGS - All About U (featuring Problem aka Jason Martin) (2019)
- Jay Worthy & LNDN DRGS - Sideshow (featuring Conway The Machine) (2019)
- Jay Worthy & LNDN DRGS - Town Bidness (featuring Casey Veggies) (2019)
- Jay Worthy - Westside Love (featuring Danosta & Ru Gotti) (2020)
- Jay Worthy & Shlohmo - Ride (featuring Krazie Bone) (2020)
- Jay Worthy - Who I Do It For (2020)
- Jay Worthy - Hate On Me (2020)
- Jay Worthy - Boogie Man (featuring Honda Carter) (2021)
- Jay Worthy - Members Only (Outside) (featuring Slumlord Trill) (2021)
- Jay Worthy & LNDN DRGS & Larry June - Leave It Up To Me (2022)
- Jay Worthy & Harry Fraud - Earth Sky (featuring MadeInTYO) (2022)
- Jay Worthy & Harry Fraud - Daytons (featuring Ramirez) (2022)
- Jay Worthy & Harry Fraud - Editorials (featuring Curren$y) (2022)
- Jay Worthy & Harry Fraud - Good Lookin’ (featuring Kamaiyah) (2022)
- Jay Worthy & DJ Muggs - 95 (2022)
- Jay Worthy & DJ Muggs - Check In (2022)
- Jay Worthy - Terry Davis (featuring Curren$y) (2023)
- Jay Worthy & DJ Muggs - We Ain’t Playing (featuring Devin The Dude & 2 Eleven) (2023)
- Jay Worthy & DJ Muggs & Spanto - Check In (Original Version) (2023)
- Jay Worthy - 10 G’s (featuring IAMNOBODI) (2023)
- Jay Worthy & Harry Fraud - GS 350 (2023)
- Jay Worthy & Roc Marciano - Underground Legends (featuring Bun B) (2023)
- Jay Worthy & Roc Marciano - Wake Up (2023)
- Jay Worthy - From The Jump (Original Version) (featuring Wiz Khalifa & OhGeesy) (2023)
- Jay Worthy & LNDN DRGS - Summer Madness (Freestyle) (2023)
- Jay Worthy & Jake One - Christopher Walken (2023)
- Jay Worthy & Kamaiyah & Harry Fraud - 9AM (2023)
- Jay Worthy & Meet The Whoops - Meet The Whoops (2023)
- Jay Worthy & LNDN DRGS - Waffle House (featuring Stalley) (2024)
- Jay Worthy & LNDN DRGS - Real Original (featuring Domo Genesis) (2024)
- Jay Worthy & LNDN DRGS - Amalfi Drive (featuring Leven Kali & Compton Most Wanted) (2024)
- Jay Worthy & Dam Funk - Westside (featuring Dram) (2024)
- Jay Worthy & Dam Funk - 105 West (featuring DJ Quik, A-Trak, Ty Dolla $ign, & Channel Tres) (2024)
- Jay Worthy & MadeInTyo - Master Delux (2024)
- Jay Worthy & MadeInTyo - Nino (2024)
- DJ Quik & Problem aka Jason Martin & Jay Worthy & Meet The Whoops - Meet The Whoops (2024)
- Jay Worthy & Meet The Whoops - Whoop Whoop (2024)
- Jay Worthy & Meet The Whoops - Where I’m From (2024)
- Jay Worthy & Meet The Whoops & Hit Boy - Stand For That (2024)
- Jay Worthy & Meet The Whoops - Christmas In The Ghetto (Freestyle) (2024)
- Jay Worthy - Computer Love (Freestyle) (2025)
- Jay Worthy & Meet The Whoops & Harry Fraud - Cuhmunity (Freestyle) (2025)
- Jay Worthy - 3 Hours Past Noon (featuring Dough Networkz) (2025)
- Jay Worthy & LNDN DRGS - I Wish (2025)
- Jay Worthy & Meet The Whoops - Outside With It (2025)
- Jay Worthy & LNDN DRGS - Choosing Shoes (featuring Boldy James) (2025)
- Jay Worthy & LNDN DRGS - Reckless (2025)
- Jay Worthy - P Funkentelechy (featuring George Clinton & Leven Kali) (2025)
- Jay Worthy & LNDN DRGS - Sake (featuring Curren$y) (2025)
- Jay Worthy & LNDN DRGS - 2P’z (featuring Larry June) (2025)
- Jay Worthy - Famous Players (featuring Eyedress) (2025)
- Jay Worthy - Visions (featuring Method Man) (2026)
- Jay Worthy & 9th Wonder - I Can’t Relate (2026)
- Jay Worthy - Trippin’ (2026)
- Jay Worthy & LNDN DRGS & George Clinton - Atomic P (2026)
- Jay Worthy & LNDN DRGS & George Clinton - Knee Deep (featuring Snoop Dogg) (2026)
- Jay Worthy & LNDN DRGS & George Clinton - P Of The Week (featuring Larry June) (2026)
- Jay Worthy & YG Hootie - Initiation (2026)
