= No Brakes (song) =

2026 song by The Game featuring Drake

Single by The Game featuring Drake

from the album The Documentary III
- Released: August 20, 2026
- Genre: Hip-hop
- Length: 2:18
- Label: Numinati; FTS Global Management
- Songwriters: Jayceon Terrell Taylor; Aubrey Drake Graham; Thomas Lee Brown; Martell Smith-Williams
- Producer: FBG Goat

The Game singles chronology
"Red People" (2026)	"No Brakes" (2026)

Drake singles chronology
"Shabang" (2026)	"No Brakes" (2026)	"Cold Shoulder" (2026)

"No Brakes" is a single by American rapper The Game featuring Canadian rapper Drake, released on August 20, 2026, as part of The Game's album The Documentary III.

== Background and composition ==
On the song, Drake performs the hook, repeatedly delivering the line "[n]o brakes, no brakes, no brakes, no brakes," while The Game raps the verses.

According to The Source, The Game later stated that he had pulled Drake's original verse from the song to "keep peace" amid West Coast hip-hop tensions, with Drake instead remaining on the track only for its hook. Billboard reported that, during an appearance on Real 92.3 LA's The Cruz Show, The Game revealed multiple versions of "No Brakes" exist, stating, "[t]hat is not the first version of that song. There's about three versions, and some other versions, they weren't really too kind." When host J. Cruz asked whether Drake had originally recorded a verse for the song, The Game responded, "I don't know. Maybe," before suggesting he may have removed it "to protect the [West] Coast as a whole." He added that he had made broader edits to the album generally, saying, "I pulled certain things off the album. I altered the album a lot to make sure the focus would be more on music and less on B.S."

== Reception ==
Hot 97 reported that reaction to "No Brakes" was divided, with some listeners welcoming the reunion between the Game and Drake and others criticizing the track.

== Charts ==
Chart (2026)	Peak position
New Zealand Hot Singles (RMNZ)	15
US Hot R&B/Hip-Hop Songs (Billboard)	38

== Credits and personnel ==
- The Game – vocals, songwriting
- Drake – vocals, hook, songwriting
- Thomas Lee Brown – songwriting
- Martell Smith-Williams – songwriting
- FBG Goat – producer
