= The Alchemist (musician) =

American record producer and DJ (born 1977)

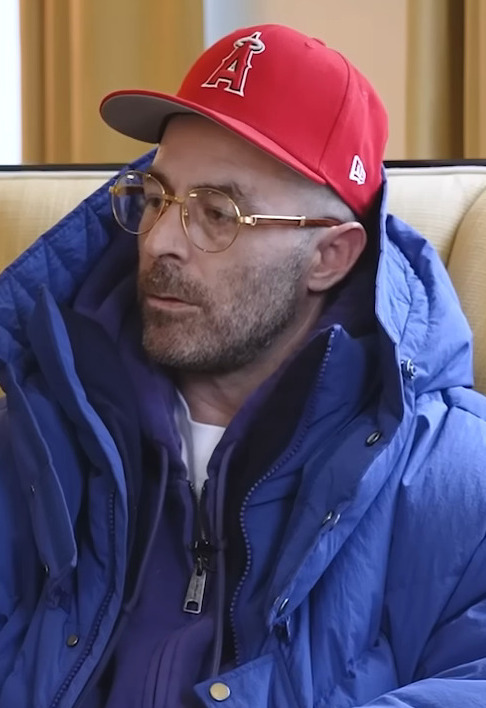
- The Alchemist in 2025

Background information
- Also known as: Alchemist; Uncle Al; Mudfoot; Alan the Chemist
- Born: Alan Daniel Maman; October 25, 1977 (age 49); Beverly Hills, California, U.S.
- Genres: Hip-hop; alternative hip-hop; jazz rap; underground rap; instrumental; lo-fi
- Occupations: Record producer; DJ; rapper; songwriter
- Works: The Alchemist production discography
- Years active: 1991–present
- Labels: ALC; Decon; Shady
- Member of: Boldy James & the Alchemist; Currensy & the Alchemist; Gangrene; Step Brothers; The Whooliganz
- Website: alcrecords.com

Alan Daniel Maman (born October 25, 1977), known professionally as the Alchemist, is an American record producer, DJ and rapper. Critically acclaimed for his sample-heavy production style, he is regarded as one of the most influential producers in modern hip-hop and underground rap. His frequent collaborators include Mobb Deep, Curren$y, Freddie Gibbs, Larry June and Boldy James.

Raised in Beverly Hills, California, Maman began his career in music as a rapper in the early 1990s as part of the duo the Whooliganz. He transitioned to production in the late 1990s, gaining recognition for his work with Dilated Peoples and Mobb Deep. Maman relocated to New York City to further his career, during which he worked with East Coast artists including Nas, Jadakiss and Prodigy.

Maman gained wider recognition for producing the 1999 single "The Realest" for Mobb Deep, which helped establish his signature sound. He was credited on a string of critically acclaimed projects throughout the 2000s and 2010s, including work on Action Bronson's Mr. Wonderful.

As a solo artist, Maman has released several instrumental albums and collaborative projects. His debut solo album, 1st Infantry (2004), featured a mix of well-known and underground rappers. He has since released numerous acclaimed projects, including Russian Roulette (2012), the Rapper's Best Friend series, and The Food Villain (2020). Together with collaborators Oh No (with whom he forms the group Gangrene), Woody Jackson and Tangerine Dream he composed the official score to the 2013 video game Grand Theft Auto V and hosts the radio station "The Lab" in it.

Furthermore, he has released collaborative projects with various artists, including Covert Coup (2011) with Currensy, Albert Einstein (2013) with Prodigy, Fetti (2018) with Freddie Gibbs and Currensy, Haram (2021) and Mercy (2025) with Armand Hammer, The Great Escape (2023) with Larry June, Voir Dire (2023) with Earl Sweatshirt, Faith Is a Rock with Mike and Wiki (2023) and Alfredo (2020) with Freddie Gibbs, which was nominated for Best Rap Album at the 63rd Annual Grammy Awards. As a member of a duo with Boldy James, they have released four albums and one EP.

== Career ==
=== 1991–2003: Early career, the Whooliganz and Soul Assassins ===
Alan Daniel Maman grew up in Beverly Hills, California. As a teenager, Maman began to identify strongly with the rebellious lyrics and urban sounds of hip-hop, and eventually started writing his own lyrics. He credited the influence of the Beastie Boys as a pivotal moment in his early career, citing that their story as Jewish musicians became an inspiration to him. He joined up with other like-minded artists who wrote lyrics and rebelled against their suburban surroundings. These included Evidence and Scott Caan (son of James Caan).

In 1991, a 14-year-old Maman and Scott Caan formed a duo named the Whooliganz. While rapping at a party in Los Angeles, they attracted the attention of B-Real of Cypress Hill. B-Real invited the teens to join his crew, Soul Assassins, which also included the groups House of Pain and Funkdoobiest.

The Whooliganz released their first single, "Put Your Handz Up", in 1993. The song received little radio airplay and their record label, Tommy Boy Records, decided to shelve their album. Feeling rejected, Caan decided to focus on acting, while Maman developed an interest in the process of making hip-hop beats.

DJ Muggs mentored and taught him how to use a sampler and mixing board. After helping to produce a few tracks for Cypress Hill, Maman became the main producer for his childhood friend Evidence and his group Dilated Peoples. Maman also produced several tracks on the debut album of Likwit Crew member Defari, who was another Dilated Peoples and tha Alkaholiks affiliate. In 1999, Muggs introduced Maman to his good friends, the popular hip-hop group Mobb Deep. Maman produced two songs for Mobb Deep's Murda Muzik album. Impressed by Maman's production skills and street smarts, Mobb Deep continued using his beats on all of the group's subsequent albums. As Maman's profile in the music industry grew, he began producing for many of hip-hop's most successful and prominent artists, such as Nas, Fat Joe, Jadakiss, Ghostface Killah, and Snoop Dogg. He has also remixed songs for bands and artists in other genres, such as Linkin Park and Morcheeba.

In 1999, Maman was set to produce three tracks for American rapper Ras Kass' then-upcoming album Van Gogh, which was scheduled for a late 2000 release at the time. One of the said tracks was "Home Sweet Home", which was also slated to be the album's lead single. After receiving the first half of the payment for the beat, Maman accused Ras Kass' record label Priority of ignoring him. In 2000, while attending the Source Hip-Hop Music Awards in Pasadena, California, Maman informed Ras Kass that he'd been showcasing the beat to other artists. Jadakiss would then go on to record "We Gonna Make It" over the same beat for his 2001 release, Kiss tha Game Goodbye. After taking notice of this, Ras Kass attempted to stop the release by releasing his version of the song on mixtapes, to no avail. This prompted Ras Kass to diss Maman in freestyles and on a track on Van Gogh. Eventually, the beef ended with Ras Kass citing a loss of respect for Maman as a producer. In an interview with www.hiphopgame.com, Ras Kass admitted that he had been stubborn and refused to listen when Maman approached him about the payment issue. The pair briefly reconciled, with Maman producing the track "Get It In" for Ras Kass's 2006 album entitled Eat or Die, before falling out again.

=== 2004–2008: 1st Infantry and Shady Records ===
In 2004, six years after his rapping career folded, Maman released his debut album, 1st Infantry. The album yielded the single "Hold You Down", featuring Prodigy, Illa Ghee, and Nina Sky, which hit number ninety-five on the Billboard Hot 100 in 2005.

After DJ Green Lantern departed Shady Records in 2005 due to a dispute related to the feud between 50 Cent and Jadakiss, Maman began serving as Eminem's official concert DJ.

On July 13, 2005, the tour bus carrying Eminem's entourage, including Maman and rapper Stat Quo, was involved in an accident when it swerved off the road and flipped over. Maman was treated for broken ribs and a collapsed lung.

In 2006, Eminem released a collaboration album with Shady Records called Eminem Presents: The Re-Up. Maman was responsible for compiling the album into a mixtape format, as well as producing some of its tracks.

In 2007, Maman produced Prodigy's second solo album, Return of the Mac, which debuted at number thirty-two on the Billboard 200, selling 27,000 copies in its first week.

=== 2009–2011: Chemical Warfare and Gangrene ===
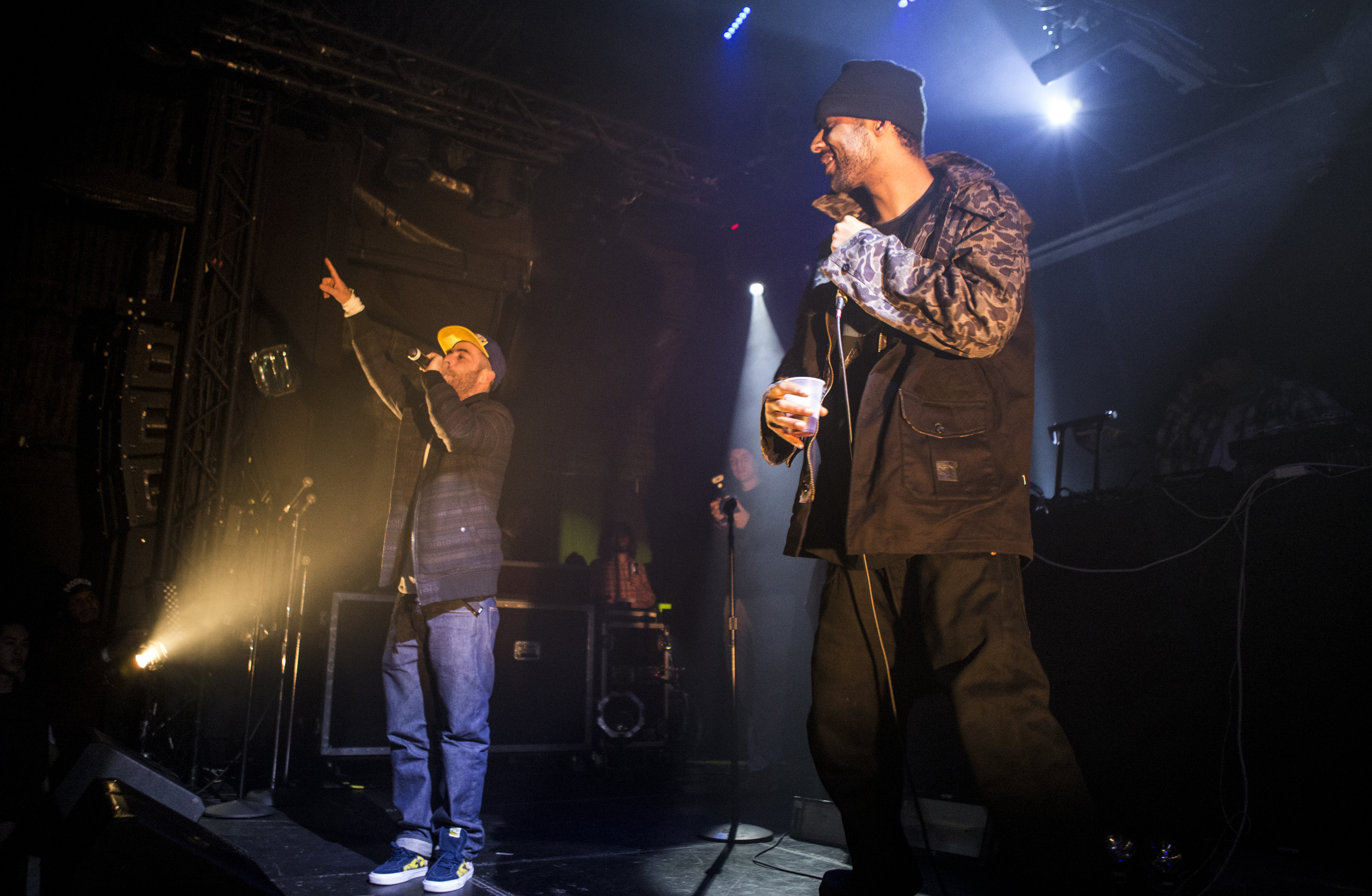
Gangrene performing in March 2014

Maman is one of the music producers behind the video game Grand Theft Auto: Chinatown Wars released by Rockstar Games in 2009.

On July 7, 2009, Maman released his second studio album, Chemical Warfare. It contains two tracks by Gangrene, the group consisting of Maman himself and Oh No. Since then, they released three studio albums and, along with Tangerine Dream and Woody Jackson, contributed music for the 2013 video game Grand Theft Auto V.

In 2009, Maman produced an entire mixtape with rapper Fashawn, called The Antidote.

=== 2012–2014: Russian Roulette and Step Brothers ===
On July 17, 2012, Maman released his third studio album, Russian Roulette.

In August 2012, Maman produced the mixtape of Odd Future member, Domo Genesis, entitled No Idols.

Rare Chandeliers, Maman's collaboration mixtape with Action Bronson, was released on November 15, 2012.

Prodigy's second album with Maman, Albert Einstein, was released on June 11, 2013. It debuted at number 175 on the Billboard 200 chart, with first-week sales of 3,000 copies in the United States.

In 2012, Boldy James signed a record deal with Decon for a Maman-produced album; My 1st Chemistry Set was released on October 15, 2013.

On December 18, 2013, Maman was named the runner-up for Producer of the Year by HipHopDX.

Since 2008, Maman and fellow rapper Evidence have performed as the duo Step Brothers. Their debut album, Lord Steppington, was released through the record label Rhymesayers Entertainment in January 2014. In an interview discussing the album, Maman stated, "I want to create a sound for it. I don't want Step Brothers songs to sound like it could've been a Dilated Peoples song, or an Evidence song, that I'd rap on."

In an interview for Dead End Hip-Hop, Maman stated that he had been working on a project related to the gospel. Later, on March 2, 2014, he posted a teaser photo to The Good Book, a collaboration between Maman and producer Budgie. He also retweeted a tweet from Frank the Butcher, the founder of BAU, which the project was going to be released on, announcing the project and saying that more information will be released two days after.

Later, on March 5, they announced that the project name would be The Good Book, and released the first single "In Heaven's Home", featuring Roc Marciano and Prodigy. It comes in a well-designed cover in a shape of a bible book, covered in leather, and is limited to one thousand. It released on March 11. The project includes mostly instrumentals and also some raps featuring Prodigy, Roc Marciano, Action Bronson, Domo Genesis and Blu.

=== 2015–present: Craft Singles and collaborative albums ===
On March 6, 2015, a while after Rockstar Games announced the release of the PC version of Grand Theft Auto V, it was announced that Maman and Oh No would have a new radio station called The Lab in the game. In addition to that, a new song "Play It Cool", featuring Earl Sweatshirt and Samuel Herring, was released. The song is apart from a new album of tracks inspired by GTA V named Welcome to Los Santos that was released on April 21, 2015. The album is a compilation album of new songs from a wide range of artists. Maman and Oh No were involved in the production of the songs, and the album was released for the release of the PC version of the game.

On November 18, Maman released a single on his SoundCloud, featuring Mac Miller and Migos, titled "Jabroni". Later he said on Twitter that it would be released on limited 45 vinyl single with an instrumental version, as part of a new single series, called Craft Singles. On February 11, Maman announced the dates of release of every one of the four Craft Singles vinyls. The tracks were: "Hoover Street (Original Version)" by Schoolboy Q (March 11, 2016), "Any Means" and "Supply" by MC Eiht and Spice One (April 8), "Cobb" and "Palisades" by Blu (May 6) and "Jabroni" (June 3). Some of those were already released online and Maman released the "Hoover Street (Original Version)" online on the same day of the announcements. On August 11, another song was released: "All for It" by Roc Marciano.

On March 2, 2016, Havoc posted a photo on his Instagram stating that his next album is produced by Maman, and is coming soon. The title was revealed to be The Silent Partner and the first single, "Maintain", was released later. The album was released on May 20.

In December 2016, mixer Eddie Sancho revealed that he was mixing a joint project by Maman and rapper Jay Worthy. Much later, in April 2017, Maman revealed the name and June 2 release date of the project, titled Fantasy Island EP.

Maman teased the sequel to The Good Book project with producer Budgie on his Instagram Story a couple of times. Then, on May 7, 2017, he surprisingly tweeted a link to pre-order the project and a first single, "Brother Jedediah", featuring Action Bronson and Big Body Bess. The project was released on July 21. Like the previous Good Book, it contains two parts, one by Maman and one by Budgie. Maman's part features lyrics from Mobb Deep, Westside Gunn, Conway the Machine, Royce da 5'9", Action Bronson and more, as well as beats and some audio collages.

In November 2019, Maman and Action Bronson announced that a new special edition vinyl of Rare Chandeliers is coming soon, along with a brand new collaboration EP, Lamb over Rice. The EP was released on November 22 and it contains seven tracks. Five of them are brand new, but it also contains two previously released singles: "Descendant to the Stars", that was released on 2016 for Action Bronson's Antient Aliens show, and "Just the Way It Is" that was a part of Maman's Coca-Cola mix "Diagnosis" from 2013, sampling a Coca-Cola commercial.

Lulu, a collaboration EP with Conway the Machine, was released on March 30, 2020.

On May 27, 2020, Freddie Gibbs and Maman announced the release of new music via social media, before confirming the collaborative project named Alfredo shortly after. The announcement came alongside the option for pre-ordering the album in digital and physical format, including a comic book stylized based on the album.

On October 3, 2020, Maman released A Doctor, Painter & An Alchemist Walk Into a Bar, a collaborative project with DRx Romanelli and Spencer Lewis.

On August 25, 2023, Voir Dire, a collaborative project with Earl Sweatshirt, was released for free on the Gala Music website.

On May 5, 2024, Maman produced "Meet the Grahams", a diss track by Kendrick Lamar towards Drake as part of their ongoing feud.

On February 7, 2025, Life Is Beautiful, a collaborative project with Larry June and 2 Chainz, was released. The album's press run saw the trio in New York City where they would perform on The Tonight Show Starring Jimmy Fallon.

In March 2025, R&B/neo-soul singer Erykah Badu revealed she was working on an album slated to be produced solely by Maman. The song "Next to You" was released in June 2025, serving as the lead single to their upcoming Abi & Alan album.

On July 25, 2025, Freddie Gibbs and Maman released Alfredo 2. In September 2025, it was announced the album Mercy with Armand Hammer was planned for release on November 7, 2025, through Backwoodz Studioz. On October 7, 2025, Hit-Boy and The Alchemist announced their collaborative project named Goldfish, which was released on October 24, 2025.

On August 28, 2026, a collaborative album, Before the World Blows with Erykah Badu, was released by Control Freaq/Young.

== Personal life ==
Maman is Jewish, and was named as one of the 10 most influential Jewish artists in rap over the last 50 years. His father is Israeli, and when he was visiting Israel he "conceived of creating an entire album made from Israeli samples." In June of 2023, he returned to Israel once again for a concert, saying that "he never expected to feel so at home in Tel Aviv, and he emphasized it will always be home for him".

== Discography ==
=== Studio albums ===
Title	Album details	Peak chart positions			
Title	Album details	US	US R&B/HH	US Rap	US Ind.
1st Infantry	Released: June 29, 2004; Label: ALC, eOne; Format: CD, LP, digital download, streaming	101	11	6	8
Chemical Warfare	Released: July 7, 2009; Label: ALC, eOne; Format: CD, LP, digital download, streaming	63	13	4	6
Russian Roulette	Released: July 17, 2012; Label: ALC, Decon, RED; Format: CD, LP, digital download, streaming	—	65	—	—
360 Waves (with Durag Dynasty)	Released: March 26, 2013; Label: Nature Sounds; Format: CD, digital download, streaming	—	—	—	—
Albert Einstein (with Prodigy)	Released: June 11, 2013; Label: Infamous; Format: CD, digital download, streaming	175	19	13	33
The Silent Partner (with Havoc)	Released: March 8, 2016; Label: Babygrande; Format: CD, digital download, streaming	—	27	17	36
Alfredo (with Freddie Gibbs)	Released: May 29, 2020; Label: ALC, ESGN, Empire; Format: CD, LP, digital download, streaming	15	12	11	3
Haram (with Armand Hammer)	Released: March 26, 2021; Label: Backwoodz Studioz; Format: CD, digital download, streaming	—	—	—	—
The Elephant Man's Bones (with Roc Marciano)	Released: August 26, 2022; Label: ALC, Pimpire; Format: CD, LP, digital download, streaming	—	—	—	—
The Great Escape (with Larry June)	Released: March 31, 2023; Label: ALC, The Freeminded, Empire; Format: CD, LP, digital download, streaming	32	12	9	4
Voir Dire (with Earl Sweatshirt)	Released: August 25, 2023; Label: ALC, Tan Cressida, Warner; Format: CD, LP, digital download, streaming	—	—	—	—
Faith Is a Rock (with Mike and Wiki)	Released: September 22, 2023; Label: ALC; Format: CD, LP, digital download, streaming	—	—	—	—
Black & Whites (with Hit-Boy and Big Hit)	Released: May 30, 2024; Label: ALC, Surf Club; Format: CD, LP, digital download, streaming	—	—	—	—
The Skeleton Key (with Roc Marciano)	Released: December 9, 2024; Label: ALC, Pimpire; Format: Digital download, streaming	—	—	—	—
Life Is Beautiful (with Larry June and 2 Chainz)	Released: February 7, 2025; Label: ALC, The Freeminded, Empire; Format: LP, digital download, streaming	89	35	—	15
Alfredo 2 (with Freddie Gibbs)	Released: July 25, 2025; Label: ALC, ESGN, Virgin; Format: CD, LP, digital download, streaming	13	6	4	1
Goldfish (with Hit-Boy)	Released: October 24, 2025; Label: ALC, Surf Club, Empire; Format: CD, LP, digital download, streaming	—	—	—	—
Mercy (with Armand Hammer)	Released: November 7, 2025; Label: Backwoodz Studioz; Format: CD, LP, digital download, streaming	—	—	—	—
Before the World Blows (with Erykah Badu)	Released: August 28, 2026; Label: Control Freaq, Young; Format: CD, LP, digital download, streaming	—	—	—	—

=== Extended plays ===
- The Alchemist's Cookbook (2008)
- How Does It Feel (2011) (with ChrisCo)
- Masterpiece Theatre (2013) (with Willie the Kid)
- Fashionably Late (2014) (with Fashawn)
- Rap 'n Glorie (2016) (with Kempi)
- Fantasy Island (2017) (with Jay Worthy)
- Lunch Meat (2018)
- Bread (2018)
- Yacht Rock 2 (2019)
- Lamb Over Rice (2019) (with Action Bronson)
- Lulu (2020) (with Conway the Machine)
- This Thing of Ours (2021)
- This Thing of Ours 2 (2021)
- Flying High (2023)
- Flying High: Part Two (2023)
- The Genuine Articulate (2024)

=== Mixtapes ===
- The Cutting Room Floor (2003)
- Insomnia (2003)
- Heavy Surveillance (2003) (with Dilated Peoples)
- The Chemistry Files (2006)
- No Days Off (2006)
- The Cutting Room Floor 2 (2008)
- The Antidote (2009) (with Fashawn)
- No Idols (2012) (with Domo Genesis)
- Rare Chandeliers (2012) (with Action Bronson)
- The Cutting Room Floor 3 (2013)
- The Past and Present (2014) (with Agallah)
- Paris L.A. Bruxelles (2017)
- Hall & Nash 2 (2023) (with Westside Gunn and Conway the Machine)

=== Instrumental albums ===
- The Good Book (2014) (with Budgie)
- Israeli Salad (2015)
- The Good Book, Vol. 2 (2017) (with Budgie)
- Mixed Fruit, Vol. 1: Pineapple Ginger (2025)
- The Good Book III (2026) (with Budgie)

=== Instrumental EPs ===
- Retarded Alligator Beats (2015)
- Moving Parts (2017) (with Lunice)
- French Blend (2017)
- French Blend Pt. 2 (2017)
- A Doctor, Painter & An Alchemist Walk Into a Bar (2020) (with DRx Romanelli and Spencer Lewis)
- The Food Villain (2020)
- Carry the Fire (2021)
- Cycles (2021)

=== Compilations ===
- The Alchemist Sandwich (2022)

=== Instrumental compilations ===
- Gangster Theme Music (2000)
- Action/Drama (2001)
- The Ultimate Music Machine (2002)
- Lab Tested, Street Approved (2004)
- Rapper's Best Friend (2007)
- Rapper's Best Friend 2 (2012)
- Rapper's Best Friend 3 (2014)
- Rapper's Best Friend 4 (2017)
- Rapper's Best Friend 5 (2019)
- Rapper's Best Friend 6 (2021)

=== Singles ===
- "E=MC²" (1999) (featuring Evidence and Mr. Eon)
- "The Man: The Icon" (2001) (with Big Daddy Kane)
- "Different Worlds" (2001) (with Twin)
- "Block Value" (2002) (featuring Littles and Prodigy)
- "Backwards" (2003) (featuring Mobb Deep)
- "The Midnight Creep" / "Fourth of July" (2004) (with Mobb Deep, Twin and Evidence)
- "Hold You Down" (2004) (featuring Prodigy, Illa Ghee and Nina Sky)
- "Bangers" (2004) (featuring Lloyd Banks)
- "Key to the City" (2007) (featuring Prodigy and Nina Sky)
- "Lose Your Life" (2008) (featuring Jadakiss, Snoop Dogg and Pusha T)
- "Smile" (2009) (featuring Maxwell and Twista)
- "Yacht Rock" (2012)
- "SSUR" (2013)
- "Diagnosis" (2013) (featuring Action Bronson)
- "British Knights: Which Way's the Beach" (2014) (with Samiyam and Action Bronson)
- "Brother Jedidiah" (2017) (featuring Action Bronson and Big Body Bes)
- "A Thousand Birds" (2017) (featuring Conway the Machine and Westside Gunn)
- "Try My Hand" (2017) (featuring Mobb Deep)
- "Fork in the Pot" / "94 Ghost Shit" (2018) (featuring Conway the Machine, Westside Gunn and Schoolboy Q)
- "Still Playing Celo" / "Codename" (2019) (with Meyhem Lauren)
- "Layups" (2019) (with The Cool Kids)
- "A Man of Many Hats" (2020)
- "Doka Sessions" (2022)
- "One More" (2022) (with Mike and Wiki)
- "60 Days" (2023) (with Larry June)
- "89 Earthquake" (2023) (with Larry June)
- "Slipping Into Darkness" (2023) (with Hit-Boy)
- "Nothing Is Freestyle" (2023)
- "Palisades, CA" (2023) (with Larry June and Big Sean)
- "Porsches in Spanish" (2023) (with Larry June)
- "Theodore & Andre" (2024) (with Hit-Boy)
- "Seasons Change" (2024)
- "Next to You" (2024) (with Erykah Badu)
- "Together Forever" (2024) (with Big Sean)
- "Ferraris in the Rain" (2024) (featuring Schoolboy Q)
- "Ferraris in the Rain Part 2" (2024) (featuring Schoolboy Q and Freddie Gibbs)
- "Floppy Disks" (2024)

==== Craft Singles series ====
- "Hoover Street (Original Version)" (2016) (with Schoolboy Q)
- "Any Means" / "Supply" (2016) (with MC Eiht and Spice 1)
- "Cobb" / "Palisades" (2016) (with Blu)
- "Jabroni" (2016) (with Migos and Mac Miller)
- "All for It" (2016) (with Roc Marciano)
- "Fat Albert" (2016) (with Currensy and Lil Wayne)
- "Brand Name" (2017) (with Mach-Hommy)
- "Universal Studios" (2018) (with Wiz Khalifa)
- "In Case You Forgot" (2018) (with Roc Marciano)
- "W.Y.G.D.T.N.S." (2019) (with Schoolboy Q)
- "Plug House" (2019) (with Benny the Butcher)
- "Wind in My Sails" (2020) (with Earl Sweatshirt)
- "Drug Zone" (2022) (with Boldy James)
- "Diesel" (2022) (with Kool G Rap)
- "Lonnie P" (2023) (with Vince Staples)
- "No Yeast" (Remix) (2023) (with Currensy, Boldy James and Westside Gunn)
