= The Documentary III =

Studio album by the Game
- Released: August 21, 2026
- Genre: Hip-hop
- Length: 87:48
- Labels: Numinati; FTS Global Management
- Producers: Axlfolie; AzizTheShake; Bangladesh; Beat Butcha; Big Duke; Buci; Coleman; Conductor Williams; Cool & Dre; Cubeatz; Donut; FBG Goat; JasonMartin; Jet Stanley; London on da Track; Maneesh; Maxwell BAE Seay; Mike & Keys; Papatinho; Phonix Beats; Roccstar; Sela V; Sndtrak; Statik Selektah; Titus Johnson; Tommy Brown; Traxster; Treyvonce; Ye

The Game chronology
Gangsta Grillz: E.M.N.T – The Credits (2026)	The Documentary III (2026)

Singles from The Documentary III
- 1. "No Brakes" Released: August 20, 2026

The Documentary III is the eleventh studio album by American rapper the Game, released on August 21, 2026, through Numati and FTS Global Management. It is a surprise album, which was announced the evening before its release. It features notable guest appearances by Black Thought, Drake, Drakeo the Ruler, E-40, Kanye West, Larry June, Leon Thomas, Lil Wayne, Marsha Ambrosius, PartyNextDoor, Snoop Dogg, Tyga and YG, among others. Production was handled by various producers including Bangladesh, Beat Butcha, Cool & Dre, Conductor Williams, Cubeatz, JasonMartin, Kanye West, London on da Track, Maneesh, Mike & Keys, Statik Selektah, TBHits and Traxster.

The album acts as the fourth addition in his The Documentary series, following The Documentary 2.5 in 2015.

== Background ==
The Game first mentioned The Documentary III during an interview with Tacos n Shawarma in August 2024. He later hinted at it on November 9, 2024, in a Facebook post promoting his tour. Additionally, the Game teased the album's track listing on September 5, 2024, in an Instagram post.

=== Collaboration with Kanye West ===
The Game revealed that American rapper Kanye West, gifted him two custom 2025 Mercedes-Maybach S680s in February 2025. He also stated that West asked him to announce The Documentary III. In another post, Game said that West would serve as the album's executive producer. On February 25, 2025, the rappers released "Tina" following several previews. "Tina" was originally intended for The Documentary III, though West later separated his involvement from the project after a feud with the Game, due to his support of Canadian rapper Top5, who threatened West.

=== Every Movie Needs a Trailer ===
On December 5, 2025, the Game and DJ Drama released their mixtape Every Movie Needs a Trailer. Game described the mixtape as "preparing for the release of Documentary 3." The mixtape's deluxe edition, The Credits, was released on January 30, 2026.

== Promotion and release ==
The album's lead single "No Brakes" featuring Drake was premiered by podcaster DJ Akademiks on August 20, 2026. That same day, Game announced that The Documentary III would be released on streaming services at 9 p.m. Pacific Time that evening. Game previewed the album's cover art was shot by photographer Jonathan Mannion and revealed that he co-produced the album with Tommy Brown, Mike & Keys, and Travis Wilson.

The Documentary III was officially released on August 21, 2026, through Numati and FTS Global Management.

== Composition and lyrics ==
Lyrically, the album revolves around themes of abandonment, death, legacy, family, gang life, and love. The Documentary III is noted for its use of sampling and club-oriented production.

== Critical reception ==
Professional ratings
Review scores
Source	Rating
AllMusic	3/5 stars
Ratings Game Music	C
Shatter the Standards	2.5/5 stars
Stanisland	2.5/5 stars

The Documentary III received mixed reviews from critics. Music journalist Quincy Dominic gave the album a positive review on his website RatingsGameMusic, praising its versatile production and Game's performances, though criticizing the album's 'gimmicky' moments. Writing for Shatter the Standards, Miles Everette assigned the album a mixed rating, criticizing certain songs' subject matter while praising others.

== Track listing ==
The Documentary III track listing
No.	Title	Writer(s)	Producer(s)	Length
1.	"Geezus"	Jayceon Terrell Taylor; Thomas Lee Brown; London Tyler Holmes	TBHits; London on da Track	4:36
2.	"Love It or Hate It" (with Snoop Dogg, Sela V, and Cool & Dre)	J. Taylor; Calvin Cordozar Broadus Jr.; Sela Vave; Marcello Antonio Valenzano; André Christopher Lyon	Cool & Dre; TBHits	3:23
3.	"Steppers" (featuring Lil Wayne)	J. Taylor; Dwayne Michael Carter Jr.; T. Brown; Shondrae Lee Crawford	TBHits; Bangladesh	3:27
4.	"The Life"	J. Taylor	TBHits; Maneesh	2:37
5.	"Scary Times" (with RJMrLA, Lit Papi, BG 100, Wacko, EastSide K-Boy, and Almighty Joey)	J. Taylor; Rodney Jerome Brown Jr.; George A. Taylor IV; Damon Grison; Kenneth Bernard Walker; T. Brown; Tiago da Cal Alves	TBHits; Papatinho	2:39
6.	"20 Deep" (with Mike & Keys and F.T. Hop Out)	J. Taylor; T. Brown; Michael Ray Cox; John Groover	Mike & Keys; TBHits; JasonMartin	2:32
7.	"No Brakes" (featuring Drake)	J. Taylor; Aubrey Drake Graham; T. Brown; Christian Immanuel Harry Jackson; Martell Smith-Williams	TBHits; Jet Stanley	2:18
8.	"Sticks"	J. Taylor; T. Brown; Bidaye	TBHits; Maneesh	3:39
9.	"Geekin" (with Drakeo the Ruler)	J. Taylor; Darrell Wayne Caldwell Jr.; T. Brown; Treyvonce Moore	TBHits; Buci Buci; Treyvonce Moore	2:35
10.	"40 Nights" (with Kanye West)	J. Taylor; Ye; Hassan Khaffaf; Jason Martin; Dominique Sanders	Ye; TBHits; The Legendary Traxster; Buci Buci	4:20
11.	"Do You Love Me" (with Cool & Dre)	J. Taylor; Valenzano; Lyon; T. Brown	Cool & Dre; TBHits	4:47
12.	"Run It Up" (featuring Leon Thomas)	J. Taylor; Leon George Thomas III; T. Brown; Axel Albert Morgan	TBHits; Axl Folie	4:58
13.	"Party at Game's" (with PartyNextDoor)	J. Taylor; Jahron Anthony Brathwaite; Lyon; Brandon Kenneth Bell; T. Brown	Dre; Donut; TBHits	4:45
14.	"Baby" (with Kalan.FrFr and ArmonieJay)	J. Taylor; Kalan Emani Montgomery; Armonie Williams	DontMindIfIDuke; Titus E. Johnson; Phonix Beats	2:30
15.	"In the Way" (with RJMrLA and Tyga)	J. Taylor; R. Brown Jr.; Micheal Ray Stevenson; T. Brown; Bidaye	TBHits; Maneesh	3:50
16.	"The Part" (with Lefty Gunplay, YG, RJMrLA, Mark Lux, JasonMartin, and Mike & Keys)	J. Taylor; Franklin Scott Holladay; Keenon Dequan Ray Jackson; Damaria Kayshawn Walker; Cox; Groover; T. Brown	TBHits; Mike & Keys; JasonMartin	3:58
17.	"Hella" (with RJMrLa, E-40, Serrin Joy, and Mike & Keys)	J. Taylor; R. Brown Jr.; Earl Tywone Stevens; Serrin Joy Scrutchings; Cox; Groover	Mike & Keys; Buci Buci; TBHits	3:17
18.	"Nothing 2 Hide"	J. Taylor; Abdul Aziz Dieng	AzizTheShake; Coleman	4:09
19.	"LA Monster" (with Kanye West)	J. Taylor; Ye; Howard Sturghall; T. Brown; Bidaye	TBHits; Maneesh	2:13
20.	"Meet the Parents"	J. Taylor; T. Brown; Denzel Williams	TBHits; Conductor Williams	3:48
21.	"The Pen"	J. Taylor	TBHits; Statik Selektah	3:54
22.	"The Cookout" (with Larry June)	J. Taylor; Leonard Eugene Hendricks III	Sndtrak; Beat Butcha; Tommy Parker; Biako	3:45
23.	"I Won't Be Afraid" (with Black Thought and Cool & Dre)	J. Taylor; Tariq Luqmaan Trotter; Valenzano; Lyon; Kevin Gomringer; Tim Gomringer	Cool & Dre; Cubeatz	4:44
24.	"Game Recognize Game" (with Marsha Ambrosius)	J. Taylor; Marsha Ambrosius-Billups; T. Brown; S. Vave	TBHits; Buci Buci	4:52
Total length:				87:48

=== Notes ===
- "The Part" initially included vocals by AZ Chike; he was replaced by Mark Lux on streaming services
- "Baby" features a sample of "Baby" by Ashanti.
- "LA Monster" interpolates "I Love It" by Kanye West and Lil Pump; and interpolates "What Happened to That Boy" by Baby featuring Clipse
- "I Won't Be Afraid" features a sample of Sade’s "Cherish the Day"

== Charts ==
Chart performance
Chart (2026)	Peak position
UK Album Downloads (Official Charts)	27
US Billboard 200	68
US Independent Albums (Billboard)	10
US Top R&B/Hip-Hop Albums (Billboard)	18
