= Larry June =

American rapper (born 1991)

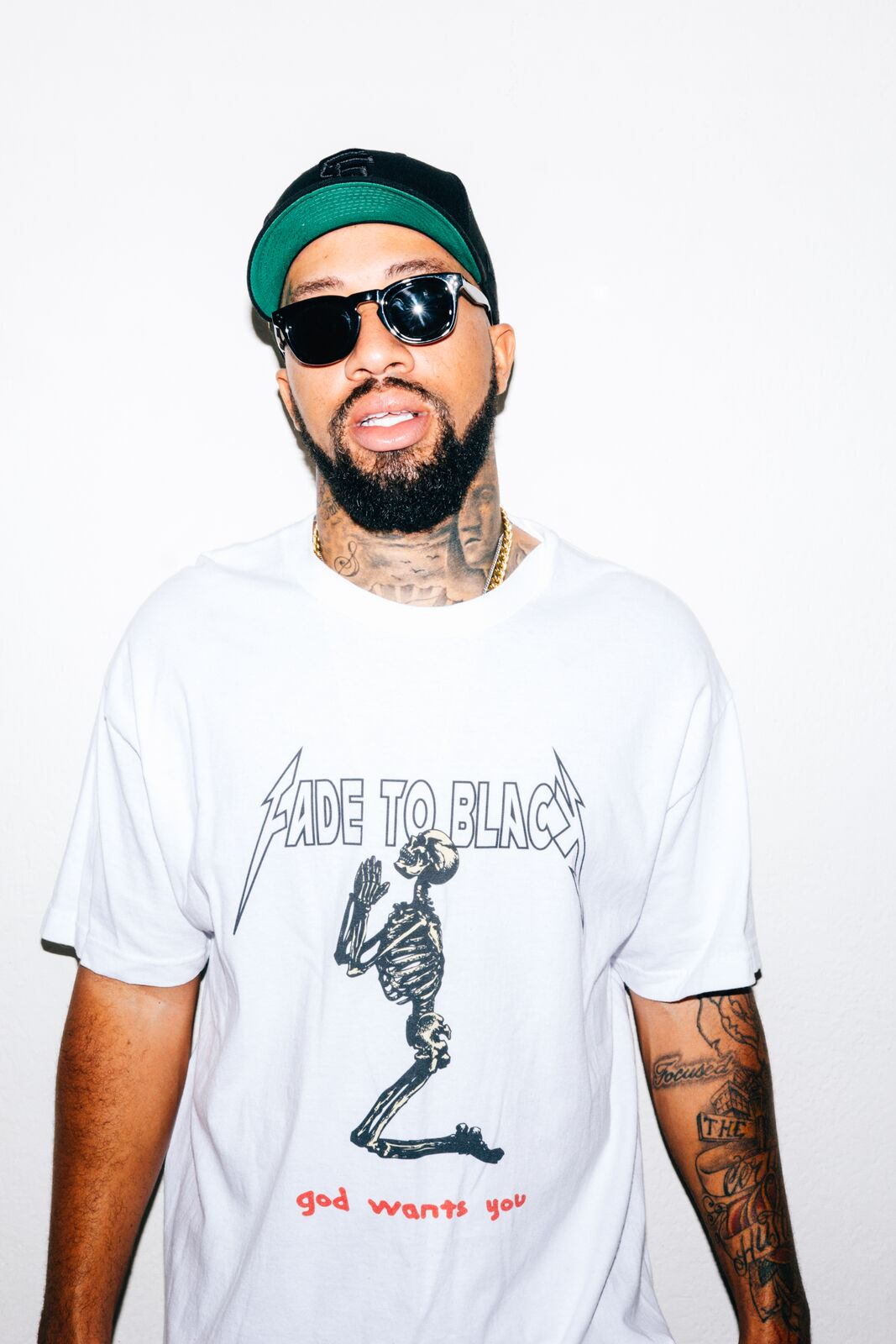
- Larry June in 2016

Background information
- Born: Leonard Eugene Hendricks III; April 8, 1991 (age 35); San Francisco, California, U.S.
- Genre: West Coast hip-hop
- Occupations: Rapper; songwriter
- Years active: 2006–present
- Labels: The FreeMinded (TFM); Empire; Warner
- Website: midnightorganic.com

Leonard Eugene Hendricks III (born April 8, 1991), known professionally as Larry June, is an American rapper from San Francisco, California. He is best known for his albums Orange Print (2021), Spaceships on the Blade (2022), and The Great Escape (2023), and has toured with fellow rappers including Cousin Stizz, Berner, Curren$y, and Post Malone. June has self-released 19 projects, and was briefly signed to Warner Records from 2015 to 2017.

== Early life ==
Larry Eugene Hendricks III is originally from San Francisco's Bayview Hunters Point neighborhood, specifically Harbor road (also home to RBL Posse and Prezi). He was born to teenage parents. At the age of five, he moved to Atlanta, Georgia, where he stayed until the age of 15, though he would return to visit family in San Francisco every summer. After middle school, June attended high school at Jesse Bethel High School in Vallejo, California. His father dabbled in rap, which influenced June. He would distribute CD's with his music to schools in his area, and found a breakthrough after selling his music to a Rasputin Music store in Berkeley. June later dropped out of high school to focus on making music.

== Career ==
As a teenager in the mid-2000s, June used MySpace to collaborate with rappers including G-Eazy, and used YouTube to listen to instrumentals by producers such as Cardo in 2008. He later collaborated with both artists. In 2010, June released his debut album, Cali Grown.

In 2014, Complex posted June's mixtape Route 80 with TM88. Following the exposure in Complex, he was signed to Warner Records, with the label giving him a $20,000 advance in exchange for two extended plays with the option for more records. According to June, Warner failed to show interest in his work, which led him to stop recording music for two years. He instead toured the US, opening for Post Malone and Smokepurpp. June released numerous tracks in 2016, including the full-length mixtape Sock It to Me. Warner eventually released him, and he created an account with DistroKid, releasing the projects You're Doing Good, Sock it to Me, Pt. 2 and Very Peaceful. As an independent artist, he made more profit from his music streams. He also released the EPs Larry and Orange Season, both of which were produced by Cookin' Soul. The release of Orange Season was accompanied by an iOS game of the same name, inspired by Nintendo's early era 8-bit graphics. He also toured with Cousin Stizz in 2016 and was featured on Stizz's song Down Like That as well as Malone's single Never Understand. Additional collaborations in 2016 include rapping with Asher Roth and Michael Christmas on the track "Laundry".

In 2020, during the COVID-19 pandemic, he recorded at his home studio, releasing six projects, including Adjust to the Game, Cruise USA, Numbers, and Keep Going. In early 2021, June launched the Honeybear Boba in San Francisco.

On June 11, 2021, June released Orange Print, a project that "displays every bit of his persona". The release marked his first to be distributed through Empire Distribution, after he stopped releasing independently through DistroKid. Speaking to The Ringer in May 2021, June said he would consider a major-label record deal if the opportunity comes, but is not rushed about it.

== Artistry ==
Logan Murdock of The Ringer wrote about June's craft: "If E-40 is rap's model of independence, June is hip-hop's Jack LaLanne, and he's primed to transform Bay Area rap. He has a mouthpiece like Mac Dre and the soul of RBL Posse, with a mission to make it on his terms, even if celebrity doesn't necessarily follow. June is known to rap about "passive income", and has said he does not consider his music to portray him as a "lifetime coach", but instead wants to help those from the streets who are trying to make a healthy income. Among his most used ad-libs are "Yee-hee", inspired by Michael Jackson, and "Good job, Larry", stemming from his ascent in the industry.”

=== Orange branding ===
Outside his career as a musician, June plans on releasing his own brand of oranges based on a suggestion from a friend whose family owns a farm. On his social media promotions, June ends his sentences with an orange emoji.

== Discography ==
=== Studio albums ===
List of studio albums
Title	Album details	Peak chart positions
Title	Album details	US
Cali Grown	Released: December 20, 2010; Label: The Freeminded; Format: Digital download, streaming	—
Cali Grown 2	Released: July 16, 2013; Label: The Freeminded; Format: Digital download, streaming	—
Very Peaceful	Released: November 29, 2018; Label: The Freeminded; Format: Digital download, streaming	—
Early Bird	Released: February 15, 2019; Label: The Freeminded; Format: Digital download, streaming	—
The Port of San Francisco	Released: April 10, 2019; Label: The Freeminded; Format: Digital download, streaming	—
Out the Trunk	Released: September 5, 2019; Label: The Freeminded; Format: Digital download, streaming	—
Product of the Dope Game	Released: November 9, 2019; Label: The Freeminded; Format: Digital download, streaming	—
Adjust to the Game	Released: March 4, 2020; Label: The Freeminded; Format: Digital download, streaming	—
Orange Print	Released: June 11, 2021; Label: The Freeminded, Empire; Format: Digital download, streaming	125
Spaceships on the Blade	Released: August 19, 2022; Label: The Freeminded, Empire; Format: CD, Digital download, streaming	39
Doing It for Me	Released: August 9, 2024; Label: The Freeminded; Format: CD, Digital download, streaming	81
Who Coppin	Released: July 17, 2026; Label: The Freeminded; Format: CD, Digital download, streaming	29

=== Collaborative albums ===
List of collaborative albums
Title	Album details	Peak chart positions
Title	Album details	US
Sock It to Me, Pt. 2 (with Sledgren)	Released: July 2, 2018; Label: The Freeminded; Format: Digital download, streaming	—
Mr. Midnight (with Cardo)	Released: June 29, 2019; Label: The Freeminded; Format: Digital download, streaming	—
Game Related (with Cardo, Payroll Giovanni, and HBK Kid)	Released: January 27, 2020; Label: EI$G, The Freeminded, BYLUG; Format: Digital download, streaming	—
Cruise USA (with Cardo)	Release date: May 7, 2020; Label: The Freeminded; Format: Digital download, streaming	—
Keep Going (with Harry Fraud)	Released: October 2, 2020; Label: The Freeminded, SRFSCHL; Format: Digital download, streaming	—
Into the Late Night (ITLN) (with Cardo)	Released: September 24, 2021; Label: The Freeminded, Empire; Format: Digital download, streaming	—
2 P'z in a Pod (with Jay Worthy)	Released: March 25, 2022; Label: GDF, The Freeminded, Empire; Format: Digital download, streaming	—
The Great Escape (with the Alchemist)	Released: March 31, 2023; Label: The Freeminded, ALC, Empire; Format: Digital download, streaming	32
The Night Shift (with Cardo)	Released: November 10, 2023; Label: The Freeminded, Empire; Format: Digital download, streaming	112
Life Is Beautiful (with 2 Chainz and the Alchemist)	Released: February 7, 2025; Label: The Freeminded, ALC, Empire; Format: Digital download, streaming	89
Until Night Comes (with Cardo)	Released: July 11, 2025; Label: The Freeminded, Empire; Format: Digital download, streaming	149
Spiral Staircases (with Currensy and the Alchemist)	Released: February 20, 2026; Label: The Freeminded, Jet Life, ALC, Empire; Format: Digital download, streaming	—

=== Extended plays ===
List of extended plays
Title	EP details
Route 80	Released: October 22, 2014; Label: The Freeminded; Format: Digital download, streaming
Bad Dreams	Released: April 8, 2015; Label: The Freeminded; Format: Digital download, streaming
Larry Bird	Released: July 6, 2015; Label: The Freeminded; Format: Digital download, streaming
Route to Spain	Released: August 27, 2015; Label: The Freeminded; Format: Digital download, streaming
Good Job Larry	Released: September 8, 2015; Label: The Freeminded; Format: Digital download, streaming
Route to U.K.	Released: October 18, 2015; Label: The Freeminded; Format: Digital download, streaming
Larry	Released: June 17, 2016; Label: Warner; Format: Digital download, streaming
Orange Season (with Cookin' Soul)	Released: August 5, 2016; Label: Warner; Format: Digital download streaming
Larry Two	Released: February 10, 2017; Label: Warner; Format: Digital download, streaming
You're Doing Good	Released: March 2, 2018; Label: Warner; Format: Digital download, streaming
Cooks & Orange Juice (with Berner)	Released: October 27, 2020; Label: Bern One Entertainment; Format: Digital download, streaming

=== Mixtapes ===
List of mixtapes
Title	Album details
#GoodJobLarry	Released: September 10, 2015; Label: Warner Bros.; Format: Digital download
Sock It to Me (with Sledgren)	Released: January 2, 2016; Label: Warner, Taylor Gang; Format: Digital download, streaming
4 Deep No Sleep	Released: April 19, 2017; Label: Warner Bros.; Format: Digital download, streaming
Trap Larry	Released: May 16, 2019; Label: The Freeminded; Format: Digital download, streaming
Numbers	Released: December 23, 2020; Label: The Freeminded; Format: Digital download, streaming

=== Singles ===
==== As lead artist ====
Title	Year	Peak chart positions	Album
"Came a Long Way"	2015	—	Non-album single
"Larry Bird"	2015	—	Larry Bird
"My Paisa"	2015	—	Route 80
"Mad Now" (featuring OG Maco and Iamsu!)	2015	—	Non-album single
"Glock 40"	2015	—	Larry
"Joog One Time"	2016	—	Sock It to Me
"Suicide"	2016	—	Non-album singles
"Forever"	2016	—	Non-album singles
"Wall Listening"	2016	—	Non-album singles
"3rd Girl" (featuring G-Eazy)	2016	—	Orange Season
"The Scale"	2016	—	Larry Two
"Rock Band"	2017	—	Non-album singles
"So Much"	2017	—	Non-album singles
"Off the Dribble"	2017	—	Non-album singles
"Gary Payton 2" (with Ill Chris)	2018	—	Rise of Sensei
"Trap Trap Trap"	2018	—	Sock It to Me, Pt. 2
"Papers Served"	2018	—	Non-album singles
"Pleasant Hill"	2018	—	Non-album singles
"Numbers"	2018	—	Non-album singles
"Aug 12th"	2018	—	Non-album singles
"Organic Pimping" (featuring Dreebo)	2018	—	Non-album singles
"Bout Me" (with Chippass)	2018	—	Non-album singles
"Floating P's"	2019	—	Non-album singles
"Expensive Lemonade"	2019	—	Non-album singles
"33" (with Caleborate)	2019	—	Hear Me Out
"Before Rap" (with Mitchy Slick)	2019	—	Non-album singles
"Around the World" (Remix) (featuring Too Short)	2019	—	Non-album singles
"Rainy Night in SF" (with Jay Worthy and The Alchemist)	2020	—	Non-album singles
"Organic Tokens" (with Cardo)	2020	—	Cruise USA
"Wait on Me"	2021	—	Non-album single
"You Gotta"	2021	—	Orange Print
"Cookie Jar" (with Ronski and Berner)	2021	—	Non-album single
"All or Nothing" (with The Cool Kids)	2021	—	Before Shit Got Weird
"Leave It Up to Me" (with Jay Worthy)	2022	—	2 P'z in a Pod
"Private Valet"	2022	—	Spaceships on the Blade
"In My Pockets"	2022	—	Spaceships on the Blade
"Corte Madera, CA / Another Day Pt. 2" (Live at COLORS)	2022	—	Non-album singles
"Keep Calling" (with Blxst)	2022	—	Non-album singles
"60 Days" (with The Alchemist)	2023	—	The Great Escape
"89 Earthquake" (with The Alchemist)	2023	—	The Great Escape
"Palisades, CA" (with The Alchemist)	2023	—	The Great Escape
"Just Like You" (with Slum Village and The Dramatics)	2023	—	Non-album single
"Say Luv" (with 22nd Jim)	2023	—	Sleeve Music
"The Good Kind" (with Cardo)	2023	—	The Night Shift
"First Class" (with Trae tha Truth)	2023	—	Stuck in Motion
"I Suppose" (with Knucks)	2023	—	Non-album single
"Fashion Week" (with Peezy and Money Man)	2023	—	Ghetto
"Chops on the Blade" (with Cardo)	2023	—	The Night Shift
"Without You (Blxst Interlude)" (with Cardo and Blxst)	2023	—	The Night Shift

==== As featured artist ====
Title	Year	Peak chart positions	Album
"Put 'Em in a Coffin" (Keith Jenkins featuring Larry June)	2015	—	Non-album single
"Dirt" (Key Nyata featuring Larry June)	2015	—	Dad of the Year; No Way
"Laundry" (Asher Roth featuring Michael Christmas and Larry June)	2016	—	Non-album singles
"Understand" (Dutch Santana featuring Larry June and Primo)	2016	—	Non-album singles
"No Chill" (Kool John featuring Larry June)	2016	—	Up All Night
"On Sight" (Jay Worthy featuring Larry June)	2016	—	Non-album singles
"Big Money" (T.Spoon featuring Larry June)	2016	—	Non-album singles
"Pusherman" (Evenodds featuring Larry June)	2017	—	Non-album singles
"Hooligans, Pt. 2" (Coupe Cujo featuring Larry June)	2017	—	Non-album singles
"Track Shoes" (Chezi featuring Larry June)	2017	—	Non-album singles
"Money Counter" (Young L featuring Larry June)	2017	—	Non-album singles
"Like a Foo (Remix)" (Stevie Joe featuring Larry June, Chippass, Young Chop, Semi Auto CEC, and Birch Boy Barie)	2017	—	The Leak 3
"Pastime (Remix)" (RileyPnP featuring Larry June)	2017	—	Non-album singles
"Revenge" (OG Maco featuring Larry June)	2017	—	Non-album singles
"Straight to Yale" (Dretussin featuring Larry June)	2017	—	Non-album singles
"Pay Scale" (Currensy featuring Larry June)	2018	—	Non-album singles
"Living Fast Sipping Slow" (Julia Lewis featuring Yung Pinch and Larry June)	2018	—	Non-album singles
"Yeah" (Croosh featuring Larry June)	2018	—	Non-album singles
"What'z Real (Remix)" (Yung Lott featuring Mozzy, Larry June, Stevie Joe, and E-Bang)	2018	—	Non-album singles
"Ducked Off" (JoogSzn featuring SaySoTheMac and Larry June)	2019	—	Non-album singles
"Run the Bag Up" (Kool John featuring Nef the Pharaoh, Larry June, and P-Lo)	2019	—	Up All Night 2
"I Just Want to Ball" (June the Legend featuring Larry June)	2019	—	Checkered Flags and Money Bags
"Never Been Better" (Apollo Anthony featuring Larry June)	2019	—	Non-album single
"Selfies" (Tree Thomas featuring Larry June)	2019	—	Roots
"All Trapp N****s Go to Heaven" (Paypa_boy featuring 24kGoldn and Larry June)	2020	—	Non-album singles
"Saucy & Bossy" (Mafi D and Ralphy Davis featuring Larry June)	2020	—	Non-album singles
"Brand New AMG" (Joey Fatts featuring Larry June)	2020	—	Still Cutthroat
"Pay Up" (Fendi P featuring Larry June)	2020	—	Non-album singles
"Know You One (Remix)" (Young Bari featuring Fillmoe Rocky and Larry June)	2020	—	Non-album singles
"Like This" (Percy Macc featuring Larry June)	2021	—	The Program
"Ride Wit Me" (Nhale featuring Larry June)	2021	—	The Next Episode
"The New $ Team" (Kapo Bravado featuring Larry June)	2021	—	Non-album single
"Wonders" (64Johnny featuring Larry June)	2021	—	Wake Up 2018
"What's Hat'nin" (Black C featuring Larry June)	2021	—	Black Caesar
"Please Forgive Me" (Godfather of Harlem featuring Swizz Beatz and Larry June)	2021	—	Godfather of Harlem: Season 2 soundtrack
"Chill With Me" (Sledgren featuring Wiz Khalifa and Larry June)	2022	—	Non-album singles
"For Fun" (General Fly featuring Larry June and Oso Ocean)	2022	—	Non-album singles
"Jerry Curl" (Rexx Life Raj featuring Larry June)	2022	—	The Blue Hour
"Good" (P-Lo featuring Larry June)	2022	—	Stunna
"Summer Goodbye" (Steelo featuring Larry June)	2022	—	Non-album single
"Thuggin" (Yung Lott and Guce featuring Larry June)	2023	—	Lott Season
"Pop My Shit" (DJ Fresh featuring E-40, Larry June, and Dreebo)	2023	—	Non-album singles
"Toast" (T.F and Local Astronauts featuring Larry June, Jay Worthy, and Washeyi Choir)	2023	—	Non-album singles
"What's Hat'nin (DJ Idea Mix)" (Black C featuring Larry June)	2023	—	Non-album singles
"Marble Columns" (Currensy and Harry Fraud featuring Larry June)	2023	—	Vices
"Rainy Day Schedule" (Black C featuring Larry June)	2023	—	Non-album single

=== Guest appearances ===
List of non-single guest appearances, with other performing artists, showing year released and album name
Title	Year	Other artist(s)	Album
"Never Understand"	2016	Post Malone	August 26th
"Survivor Series 95"	2021	Westside Gunn, Jay Worthy, TF	Hitler Wears Hermes 8: Side B
"One of Us"	2022	Joey Badass	2000
"Golden Hour"	2023	MIKE	Burning Desire
"Bad Juju"	2024	Roc Marciano	Marciology
"Kin Xpress"	2024	Conway The Machine	Slant Face Killah
"Kompressor"	2024	Action Bronson	Johann Sebastian Bachlava The Doctor
"Put It In My Hand"	2024	YG	Just Re'd Up 3
"Million Pieces"	2024	Big Sean, Teyana Taylor, DJ Premier	Better Me Than You
"Next One"	2024	Currensy & DJ Fresh	The Tonite Show: The Sequel
"Details"	2024	The Alchemist	The Genuine Articulate
"Back From Aspen"	2025	Richie Rich, Currensy	Richard
"Feeling"	2025	Freddie Gibbs & The Alchemist	Alfredo 2
"The Cookout"	2026	The Game	The Documentary III
"Neighbors"	2026	Jhené Aiko	Westside Whimsy

=== Music videos ===
Year	Album	Title	Director	Featured artist
2014	Cali Grown	Now	Tyler Acosta	
2015	Route 80	My Paisa	Adrian Per	
2015	/	Glock 40	Kidlongshot	
2015	/	Cookin	Tyler Acosta	
2015	Good Job Larry	Max Pain	Kevin Davis	
2015	Larry	Joog One Time	Tyler Acosta	
2016	Larry	Master Manipulator	JMP	
2016	Larry	I'm Workin	Adrian Per	
2016	Larry	007	Terrence Jones & Sophia Bacuros	
2017	Larry Two	The Scale	Goodboyshady	
2017	Larry Two	4DEEP	Adrian Per	
2017	You're Doing Good	On Me	Sean Kelly	
2018	You're Doing Good	Healthy	Sean Kelly	Jazz Cartier
2018	Sock It to Me Pt. 2	Trap Trap Trap	Mike Video	
2018	Sock It to Me Pt. 2	Ocean Beach	Farid	
2018	/	Expensive Lemonade	Creating Paradise	
2018	Sock It to Me Pt. 2	Smoke & Mirrors	Creating Paradise	Curren$y
2018	Very Peaceful	One Time	Creating Paradise	
2018	/	Pleasant Hill	Creating Paradise	
2018	/	Numbers	Creating Paradise	
2018	Very Peaceful	Sausalito	Creating Paradise	
2018	Very Peaceful	Back Rappin	n/c	
2018	Very Peaceful	Organic Racks	Creating Paradise	
2018	Very Peaceful	Organic Watermelon Juice	Creating Paradise	
2018	Very Peaceful	30 Day Run	Creating Paradise	
2019	Early Bird	Early Bird	Creating Paradise	
2019	Early Bird	Slow Motion	Creating Paradise	
2019	Early Bird	Lets Go Eat	Larry June & Creating Paradise	
2019	Early Bird	24K Organic	Creating Paradise	
2019	The Port of San Francisco	Dear, Snow	Creating Paradise	
2019	The Port of San Francisco	Diamond Heights	Creating Paradise	
2019	The Port of San Francisco	Cold Summer	Creating Paradise	
2019	The Port of San Francisco	Always Want More	Creating Paradise	
2019	Trap Larry	Trap Larry	Creating Paradise	Lex Luger
2019	Mr. Midnight	Still Active	Creating Paradise	Cardo
2019	Mr. Midnight	Organic Mud	Creating Paradise	Cardo
2019	Mr. Midnight	Feeling Good Today	Creating Paradise	Cardo
2019	Mr. Midnight	Oranges on a Jet	Creating Paradise	Cardo, Curren$y
2019	Mr. Midnight	Tracy, CA	Creating Paradise	Cardo
2019	Out the Trunk	Lets Drive to Vegas	Creating Paradise	
2019	Out the Trunk	Mission Bay	Creating Paradise	
2019	Product of the Dope Game	Recaro Seats	Creating Paradise	
2019	Product of the Dope Game	Adjust to the Game	Creating Paradise	
2019	Product of the Dope Game	Spilled Orange Juice	Creating Paradise	
2020	Out the Trunk	Organic Fatherhood	Creating Paradise	Cardo
2020	Out the Trunk	Smoothies in 1991	Creating Paradise	
2020	Cruise USA	Organic Tokkens	Creating Paradise	Cardo
2020	Cruise USA	Green Juice in Dallas	Creating Paradise	Cardo
2020	Cruise USA	Rolex Truffles	Miguel415	Cardo
2020	Keep Going	I Like You	Creating Paradise	Harry Fraud
2020	Keep Going	Let's Go to New Orleans	Creating Paradise	Harry Fraud, Curren$y
2020	Keep Going	Orange Juice in Vancouver	Creating Paradise	Harry Fraud, Jay Worthy
2021	Numbers	Dear Winter	Creating Paradise	Jay Worthy
2021	Orange Print	Wait On Me	The Daily Gems	
2021	Orange Print	You Gotta	Creating Paradise	
2021	Orange Print	Still Cookin	Creating Paradise	
2021	Orange Print	6am in Sausalito	Creating Paradise	
2021	Orange Print	Intercepted	Creating Paradise	Money Man
2021	Orange Print	Grand Nash Chronicles	n/c	
2021	Into the Late Night	Friday Activities	Creating Paradise	Cardo
2021	Into the Late Night	Don't Try It	The Daily Gems	Cardo
2021	Into the Late Night	Gas Station Run	Lestyn Park	Cardo
2022	2 P'z in a Pod	Leave It Up to Me	The Daily Gems	Jay Worthy, LNDN DRGS
2022	2 P'z in a Pod	She's Not Around / Maybe The Next Time	Miguel415	Jay Worthy, Sean House
2022	Spaceships on the Blade	Private Valet	LX	
2022	Spaceships on the Blade	In My Pockets	LX	
2022	Spaceships on the Blade	Don't Check Me	David Camarena	
2022	Spaceships on the Blade	Breakfast in Monaco	Zaven	The Alchemist
2023	The Great Escape	60 Days	Sean Kelly	The Alchemist
2023	The Great Escape	89 Earthquake	Sean Kelly	The Alchemist
2023	The Great Escape	Palisades, CA	David Camarena	The Alchemist, Big Sean
2023	The Great Escape	Porsches in Spanish	Miggs & Marcela Recio	The Alchemist
2023	The Great Escape	Solid Plan	Sean Kelly	The Alchemist, Action Bronson
2023	The Great Escape	Summer Reign	David Camarena	The Alchemist, Ty Dolla $ign
2023	The Great Escape	Turkish Cotton	LX	The Alchemist
