= LA Monster =

Song by Kanye West

Song by Kanye West

from the album Jesus Is King (intended)
- Released: March 2020 (leak)
- Recorded: 2019–2020
- Length: 3:18
- Producer: Dr. Dre (Note: Only on the Jesus Is King Part II version.)

"LA Monster" is an unreleased song by American rapper Kanye West. It was originally intended for West's ninth studio album, Jesus Is King (2019), and was played at multiple listening parties for it. Though it was teased on multiple track listings for the album, the song failed to make the finished record. West's lyrics criticize the city of Los Angeles, alleging that its streets are run by Satan.

West brought back "LA Monster" for Jesus Is King Part II, a collaborative album between West and American record producer Dr. Dre. It leaked online in March 2020, with a later version that features American rapper ASAP Ferg leaking in September 2023. Elements of "LA Monster" were repurposed by American rapper the Game for a song of the same name in August 2026.

== Background and recording ==
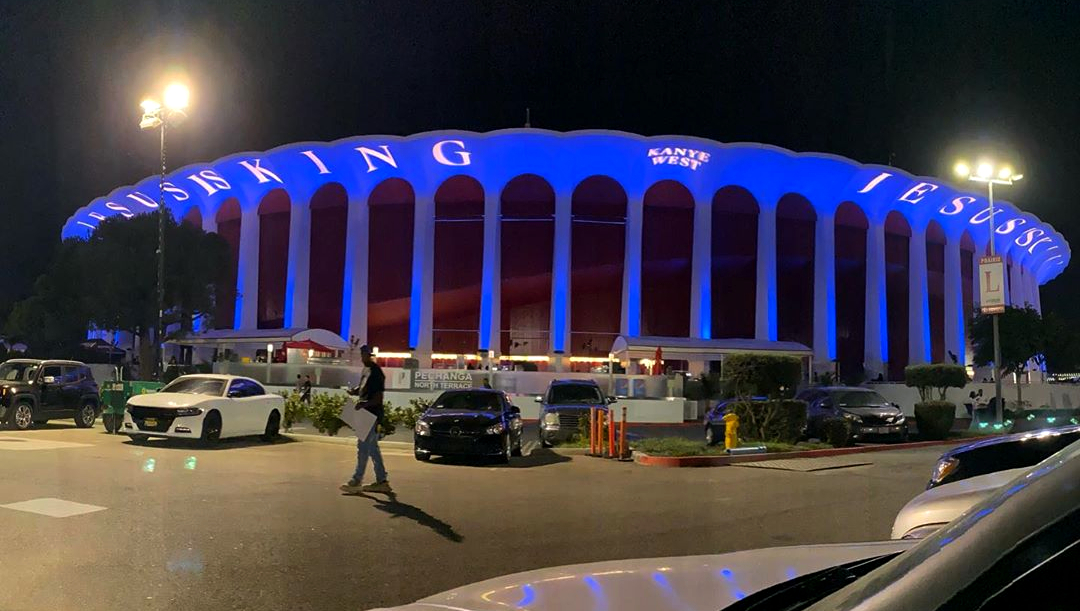
West previewed "LA Monster" at several listening parties for Jesus Is King.

In August 2019, American rapper Kanye West's then-wife, American media personality Kim Kardashian, announced that her husband's ninth album would be titled Jesus Is King. On September 27, West held a listening party for the album at the Fox Theatre in Detroit, Michigan, where "LA Monster" was played. That same day, Kardashian shared a tracklist for the album via Twitter, which included the song as the album's sixth track. On September 29, the listening party in New York City altered the order of the track list, making "LA Monster" the eighth song played out of ten. During the listening party, West announced the song's title as "Ugliest Nightmare". Jesus Is King was released on October 25, 2019, with the song being cut from its final track listing.

On November 18, 2019, West announced on Twitter that he was working with American record producer Dr. Dre on a sequel collaborative project, entitled Jesus Is King Part II. In March 2020, the reworked "LA Monster", intended for this album, leaked online, featuring co-production and mixing by Dr. Dre. Another Jesus Is King Part II track, "Up from the Ashes", had previously leaked online in February 2020. The full album leaked in its entirety on September 23, 2023, with "LA Monster" containing a verse from American rapper ASAP Ferg.

== Composition and lyrics ==
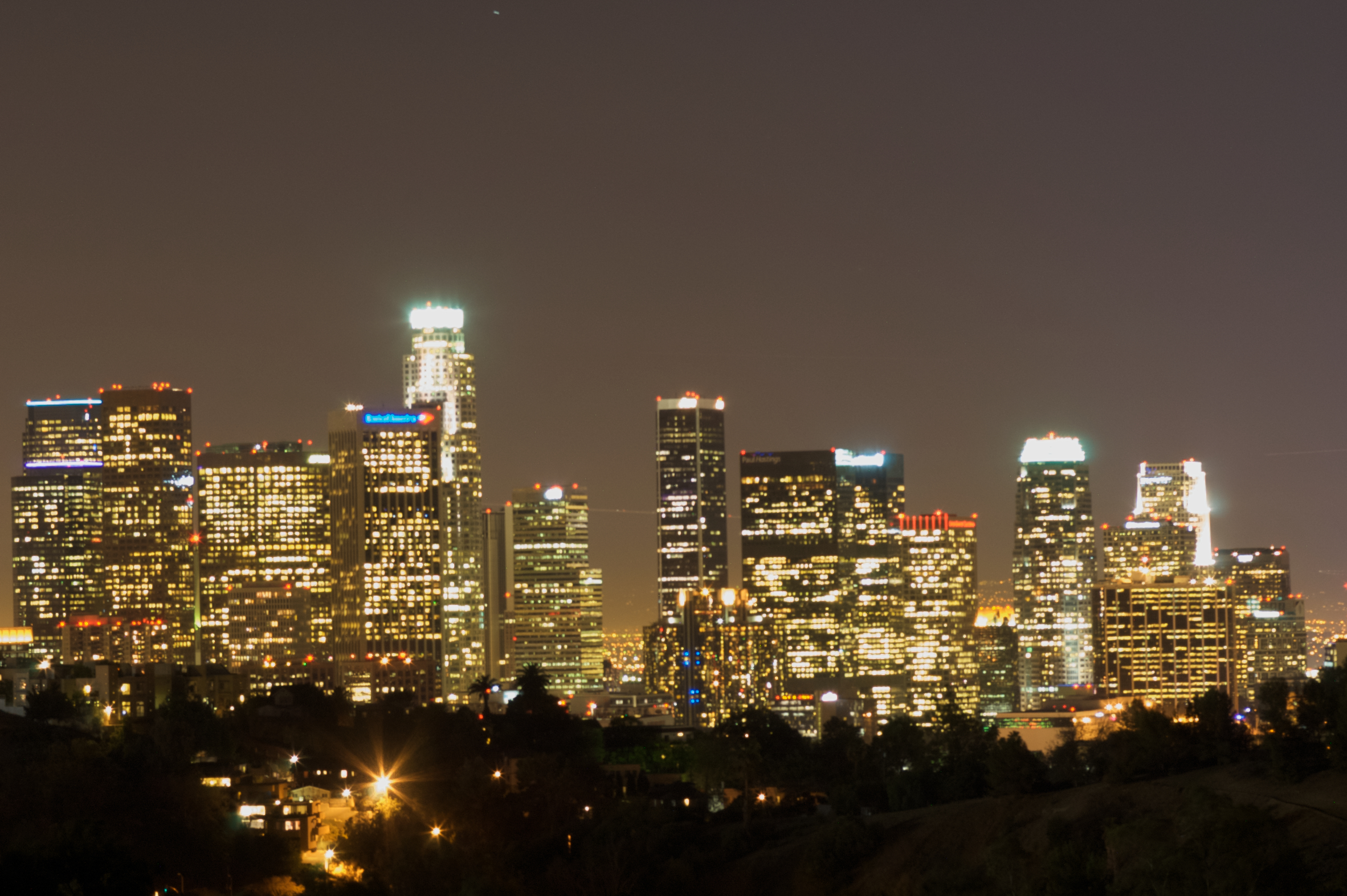
In "LA Monster", West claims that Satan runs the streets of Los Angeles (skyline pictured).

In the song, West talks about his life and grapples with "the challenges of being in [Los Angeles] and what it can do to you." West, who lived in the suburbs of Los Angeles with Kardashian at the time, raps about the city letting Satan run the streets. West pleads to God to save the people of the city from the "LA Monster", an image of the wild lifestyle of Los Angeles. West criticizes those who claim to be woke, saying that they are sleepwalking and have sold their souls. Brian McCollum of the Detroit Free Press wrote that "LA Monster" continues the overarching spiritual theme of Jesus Is King by warning "against the temptations of superficial culture." The Fader's Alex Robert Ross described West's lyrics as "him praying to be removed from the sins of his city."

== Reception ==
Gary Graff of Billboard described the song as "prayerful". Elias Leight of Rolling Stone reported on gospel artist Donald Lawrence praising the song's narrative as refreshing. Lawrence compared "LA Monster" to gospel songs that have a vertical relationship with God, stating that West talking about his life was "something praise and worship doesn't allow you to do."

== The Game version ==
"LA Monster"

Song by the Game and Kanye West

from the album The Documentary III
- Released: August 21, 2026
- Length: 2:13
- Label: Numinati; FTS Global Management
- Songwriters: The Game; HD; Lit Papi
- Producers: Tommy Brown; Big Duke

A song of the same title was released by American rapper the Game on his eleventh studio album, The Documentary III, on August 21, 2026. The Game's "LA Monster" repurposes vocals from West's Jesus Is King demo. Both critics and listeners interpreted The Game's "LA Monster" as a diss track against fellow rapper Kendrick Lamar, though affiliates of Lamar, as well as the Game himself, have denied this.
