= Roc Marciano discography =

- Studio albums: 9
- EPs: 5
- Collaborative albums: 4
- Mixtapes: 2
- Instrumental albums: 1

The discography of Roc Marciano, an American rapper, consists of nine studio albums, three collaborative albums, one instrumental album, five extended plays and two mixtapes.

== Albums ==
=== Studio albums ===
- 2010: Marcberg
- 2012: Reloaded
- 2013: Marci Beaucoup
- 2017: Rosebudd's Revenge
- 2018: RR2: The Bitter Dose
- 2018: Behold a Dark Horse
- 2019: Marcielago
- 2020: Mt. Marci
- 2024: Marciology
- 2026: 656

=== Collaborative albums ===
- 2018: Kaos (with DJ Muggs)
- 2022: The Elephant Man's Bones (with The Alchemist)
- 2024: The Skeleton Key (with The Alchemist)
- 2025: The Coldest Profession (with DJ Premier)

=== Instrumental albums ===
- 2018: Pimpstrumentals

=== Roc Marciano-produced projects ===
- 2017: Saran Rap (with Muja Messiah)
- 2018: Sabbath (with Therman Munsin)
- 2020: Continua a Sparare (Keep Firing) (with XP the Marxman)
- 2020: Reasonable Drought (with Stove God Cooks)
- 2021: Delgado (with Flee Lord)
- 2021: Ekphrasis (with Bronze Nazareth)
- 2021: If These Kitchen Walls Could Talk (with Stove God Cooks)
- 2022: Blame Kansas (with T.F. and Mephux)
- 2023: Nothing Bigger Than the Program (with Jay Worthy)
- 2025: The Round Table (with Knowledge The Pirate)
- 2025: Roc Marciano Presents: MULBERRY SILK ROAD (with Errol Holden)

=== with The U.N. ===
- 2001: World Domination: The Mixtape
- 2004: UN or U Out (World Records/456 Entertainment)

== EPs ==
- 2010: The Marcberg EP
- 2011: The Prophecy EP
- 2011: Greneberg (with Gangrene (The Alchemist + Oh No) as Greneberg)
- 2018: Warm Hennessy
- 2019: The Prequel
- 2025: The Coldest Profession (with DJ Premier)

== Mixtapes ==
- 2004: Strength & Honor (The U.N. presents Rock Marciano) (Promotional mixtape released to promote The U.N.'s album UN or U Out)
- 2013: The Pimpire Strikes Back

== Guest appearances ==
List of non-single guest appearances, with other performing artists, showing year released and album name
Title	Year	Other performer(s)	Album
"The Heist"	2000	Busta Rhymes, Raekwon, Ghostface Killah	Anarchy
"Let's Make a Toast"	2000	Easy Mo Bee, Raekwon, Chip Banks, Busta Rhymes	Now or Never: Odyssey 2000
"Set It On Fire"	2000	Tony Touch, Flipmode Squad (Roc Marciano, Busta Rhymes, Rah Digga, Rampage, Pain in da Ass)	The Piece Maker
"The Regulators"	2004	The X-Ecutioners	Revolutions
"The Example: Lost Chapters"	2004	Wordsmith	Classic Material
"Think Differently"	2005	Casual, Vordul Mega, Tragedy Khadafi	Wu-Tang Meets the Indie Culture
"Army Brickaid"	2005	Royal Fam, True Master	Black Castle
"Swordfish" (Remix)	2005	Pumpkinhead, Marco Polo	N/A
"Lay It Down"	2007	Marco Polo	Port Authority
"Change"	2007	J-Love, Meyhem Lauren	Acknowledge Greatness
"Graveyardshiftin'"	2008	DJ Babu	Duck Season. Vol. 3
"Short Race"	2008	GZA	Pro Tools
"It's So G"	2008	Pete Rock	NY's Finest
"Roc Marciano Joint"	2010	Kool A.D., Heems	Sit Down, Man
"Helpless Dreamer"	2010	Mello Music Group, Apollo Brown, Tranqill, Uptown XO	Helpless Dreamer
"The Black Diamonds"	2011	Ghostface Killah, Killa Sin	Legendary Weapons
"Scarecrows"	2011	Telemachus	In the Evening
"Shotgun"	2011	Quelle Chris, Danny Brown	Shotgun & Sleek Rifle
"Slaves"	2011	Quelle Chris	Shotgun & Sleek Rifle
"Got Berries?"	2011	A.G.	Got Berries?
"Crossroads"	2011	Meyhem Lauren	Self Induced Illness
"Slugs Thru Ya Papaya"	2011	Killah Priest	Dreddy Kruger Presents...
"Bushmaster Music (Remix)"	2011	Blaq Poet, Wais P	Blaq Poet Society (QB Slasher Remixes)
"Monetary Policy"	2011	Beneficence	Sidewalk Science
"Up Against the Wall"	2011	Consequence, Kendrick Lamar	Movies on Demand 2
"Chewbacca"	2011	Random Axe (Black Milk, Guilty Simpson, Sean Price)	Random Axe
"Fame"	2011	Evidence, Prodigy	Cats & Dogs
"G's Us"	2012	Crooked I	Psalm 82: V6
"Modern Day Revelations"	2012	Action Bronson, The Alchemist	Rare Chandeliers
"Pouches of Tuna"	2012	Action Bronson, The Alchemist	Blue Chips
"Iron Age"	2012	Ka	Grief Pedigree
"Change"	2012	The Purist	Double Feature EP
"Thug Poets"	2012	Statik Selektah, Termanology, Havoc	2012
"White Russian"	2012	Melanin 9	Magna Carta
"Grime"	2012	Fatt Father, Guilty Simpson, Sean Price	Fatherhood
"Dirt"	2012	House Shoes, Gangrene	Let It Go
"Half Dead"	2012	Apathy, Planet Asia	Diggaz With Attitude
"The Gusto"	2012	Apathy	Diggaz With Attitude
"1st Degree Murder"	2012	Vinnie Paz, Celph Titled	Diggaz With Attitude
"Drink It Up"	2012	Gangrene	Vodka & Ayahuasca
"M.A.R.S."	2012	Large Professor, Action Bronson, Cormega, Saigon	Professor @ Large
"The Hitmen"	2012	Oh No	Ohnomite
"The Turning Point"	2012	The Alchemist	Russian Roulette
"Take It Back"	2012	Chino XL, Rakaa	Ricanstruction: The Black Rosary
"Golden State (Of Mind)"	2012	Copywrite, Casual, Evidence	God Save the King
"G Lanes"	2012	Sadat X	Love, Hell or Right
"(Side A)"	2012	The Alchemist, Action Bronson, Oh No	Yacht Rock (EP)
"Egyptology"	2012	A.G.	Luv NY
"Pressure Up"	2012	A.G.	Luv NY
"The Blues Got Ya"	2012	Kool Keith	Luv NY
"Peruvian Desserts"	2012	Meyhem Lauren, Action Bronson	Respect the Fly Shit
"Cut Throat Rap"	2012	Awar, Grafh	The Laws of Nature
"Lord Knows What"	2012	Double A.B., Dub Sonata	Media Shower
"Irene"	2012	Timeless Truth	Brugal & Presidentes
"Preset Mars"	2012	Union	Analogtronics
"Tuxedo"	2012	Gensu Dean	Self Sacrifice
"Yen"	2012	Gensu Dean	Lo-Fi Fingahz
"12 Jewelz Pt.2"	2012	Gensu Dean, Nomadic	Lo-Fi Fingahz
"Makin' Moves"	2012	JR & PH7	The Good Life
"Body of Work"	2012	billy woods, Masai Bey	History Will Absolve Me
"Death Sentence"	2013	Prodigy, The Alchemist	Albert Einstein
"Pool Hall Hustler"	2013	The Alchemist, Action Bronson	The Cutting Room Floor 3
"1010 Wins"	2013	The Alchemist, Domo Genesis, Action Bronson, Meyhem Lauren, Despot	SSUR (EP)
"Absolem"	2013	DJ Muggs	Bass for Your Face
"Cement 3's"	2013	Czarface	Czarface
"Sometimes"	2013	Trinity (Sadat X, A.G., DJ Jab)	20 In
"Presume the Unpredictable"	2013	7 G.E.M.S.	Golden Era Music Sciences
"The Professional"	2013	P-Money	Gratitude
"Live from Pimpstead"	2013	14KT	Nickel & Dimed
"Fire"	2013	MidaZ The Beast	AU: Another Universe
"Light Years"	2013	DJ Skizz, A.G., O.C., Godfather Part III	BQE: The Brooklyn-Queens Experience
"Think Differently"	2013	Cannibal Ox, Casual, Tragedy Khadafi	Gotham
"Hold That"	2013	Tony Touch, Busta Rhymes, J-Doe, Reek da Villian	The Piece Maker 3: Return of the 50 MC's
"Men of Honour"	2013	Timeless Truth	Rock-It Science
"Keep It Movin"	2013	Wyld Bunch	Unbreakable
"All Blaq Everything"	2013	Blaq Poet	Blaq Death
"Casino"	2013	DUS, DJ Kwestion	Ambassadors
"Zarathustra"	2013	Sonne Ra, Katharsis	Sanfter Terrorismus
"Soap Box"	2013	Ka	The Night's Gambit
"Murdah Type Thinkin"	2013	Sean Price, M-Phazes	Land of the Crooks
"Blaze of Glory"	2014	Agallah, The Alchemist	Past and Present
"See the Rich Man Play"	2014	Step Brothers	Lord Steppington
"Marciano"	2014	Def Dee	Deja Vu
"Avalon"	2014	Willie the Kid, Bronze Nazareth	The Living Daylights
"In Heaven's Home"	2014	The Alchemist, Prodigy	The Good Book
"Grown Up's"	2014	First Division	The Critical Path Pt. 2
"Broad Daylight"	2014	Awar, Vanderslice	The Winning Team
"Fall of the Bronze (New Iron)"	2014	Ka	1200 B.C.
"Live from the Villa"	2014	A-Villa, Action Bronson, Willie the Kid	Carry on Tradition
"A Hustler's Soliloquy"	2014	A-Villa	Carry on Tradition
"The Wild Bunch"	2014	A-Villa, Oh No, Sean Price	Carry on Tradition
"Lonely & Cold"	2014	Apollo Brown	Thirty Eight
"Shotguns in Hell"	2014	Apollo Brown	Thirty Eight
"Patina"	2015	The Purist	Pyrex Scholar
"By the Book"	2015	The Purist	Pyrex Scholar
"Medusa"	2015	Willie the Kid & The Alchemist, Action Bronson	Masterpiece Theatre
"Industry Remix 2"	2015	Large Professor, Inspectah Deck, Cormega, Sadat X, Lord Jamar	Re: Living
"Half Dead"	2015	Apathy	The Black Lodge
"Day 81"	2015	Dr. Yen Lo (Ka & Preservation)	Days with Dr. Yen Lo
"Kein F"	2015	Blood Spencore, Morlockk Dilemma, Hiob	Party Is' Vorbei
"Rex Ryan"	2015	Conway the Machine, Westside Gunn	Reject 2
"Park Ave"	2016	AG Da Coroner, Action Bronson	Sip the Nectar
"Perfect Plex"	2016	The Purist, Westside Gunn	Fourth Rope
"Omar's Coming"	2016	Westside Gunn, Conway the Machine	Flygod
"Bonus Round"	2016	Meyhem Lauren, Action Bronson, Big Body Bes	Piatto D'oro
"All for It"	2016	The Alchemist	Craft Singles (45 Vinyl Series)
"Unfuckwittable"	2016	Smoke DZA, Domo Genesis	George Kush Da Button (Don't Pass Trump the Blunt)
"Bosses"	2016	DJ Skizz, Conway The Machine	Cruise Control
"Wit No Pressure"	2016	Ras Beats	Control Your Own
"Property of Spitkicker.com"	2016	De La Soul	and the Anonymous Nobody...
"Murder Paragraphs"	2016	DJ Rude One	ONEderful
"Triple Black Benz"	2016	DJ Rude One	ONEderful
"Ball of Yarn"	2016	Gensu Dean	RAW (Refined Alkaline Water)
"Fascinating Grass"	2017	Quelle Chris, Big Tone, 87	Being You Is Great, I Wish I Could Be You More Often
"Hand Gun"	2017	Creestal	Differences
"Frivolous Wardrobe"	2017	Therman Munsin	Sabbath
"Live with Show & A"	2017	Showbiz and A.G., John Robinson	Take It Back
"Horn Play”	2017	Chan Hays, Ghettosocks, Meyhem Lauren	Here
"24 Hrs"	2017	Willie the Kid	Deutsche Marks
"Street Religion"	2017	DJ Muggs & Meyhem Lauren	Gems from the Equinox
"Driven"	2017	JR & PH7, St. Joe Louis	Coral Cadavers
"Wolfing Down"	2017	Nicholas Craven	Craven N
"The Appetite"	2018	Dabrye, Quelle Chris, Danny Brown	Three/Three
"Respect My Gun"	2018	PRhyme	PRhyme 2
"Ghetto Stockbroker"	2018	DJ Muggs & Meyhem Lauren	Frozen Angels
"Ric Martel"	2018	Westside Gunn	Supreme Blientele
"Kevlar Tux"	2018	Conway The Machine & Sonnyjim	Death by Misadventure
"Can't Get Enough"	2018	Knowledge The Pirate	Flintlock
"Dean Martin Steaks"	2018	The Alchemist	Lunch Meat
"Roman Candles"	2018	The Alchemist, Black Thought	Bread EP
"Let's Begin"	2018	Jon Bellion, RZA, Blaque Keyz	Glory Sound Prep
"Murdah Type Thinkin"	2019	Sean Price, Small Professor	86 Witness
"Roses"	2019	DJ Muggs & Eto	Hells Roof
"Harry O."	2019	The Alchemist	Yacht Rock 2
"Chasing Ghosts"	2019	Your Old Droog	It Wasn't Even Close
"Sins of the Father"	2020	Ka	Descendants of Cain
"Ice Water"	2020	Flee Lord	?
"C Beam Dreams"	2020	Real Bad Man	On High Alert Volume 1
"500 Dollar Ounces"	2020	Westside Gunn, Freddie Gibbs	Pray for Paris
"Medicine Drawer"	2020	Preservation	Eastern Medicine, Western Illness
"Ferrari Drip"	2020	RU$H, Jay NiCE	Fly Art
"Durban Poison"	2020	Willie the Kid	Capital Gains
"Silence"	2021	Jameel Na'im X, Mephux	Viktor
”Wallabees & Gucci Loafers”	2021	Flee Lord & DJ Muggs, Ghostface Killah	Rammellzee
”Hallways”	2021	Peter Rosenberg, Flee Lord	Real Late
"Charter Member"	2021	Vic Spencer, Ransom	Legend Laws of Power
"Early Exit"	2021	Lloyd Banks	The Course of the Inevitable
"Photographic Memories"	2021	Boldy James & The Alchemist, Earl Sweatshirt	Bo Jackson
"1000 Mile Stare"	2021	Nicholas Craven	Non-album single
"Absolem Reprise, Pt. 1"	2021	DJ Muggs	Winter 2
"Maybe The Last Time"	2022	Jay Worthy, Larry June & LNDN DRGS	2 P’z in a Pod
"Back On One"	2022	Real Bad Man, Meyhem Lauren	On High Alert, Vol. 4
"Zambezi"	2022	Action Bronson	Cocodrillo Turbo
"Riches Part 2"	2023	Talib Kweli & Madlib	Liberation 2
"Olathe"	2023	T.F., Conway The Machine	Blame Kansas
"Special Sauce"	2023	2 Eleven, T.F.	Skanless Levels 4
"No Mercy"	2023	Sha Money XL, Cormega	—N/a
"Corsairs"	2023	Knowledge The Pirate	5LBS Of Pressure
"Adventure Time"	2023	A$AP Twelvvy	Kid$ Gotta Eat
"Crazy Horse"	2023	DJ Muggs, CRIMEAPPLE	Soul Assassins 3: Death Valley
"67 Keys"	2023	DJ Muggs, Rome Streetz, Meyhem Lauren	Soul Assassins 3: Death Valley
"Antonomasia"	2024	Mach-Hommy	#Richaxxhaitian
"You Gotta Feel It"	2024	T.F.	—N/a
"Gauntlet"	2024	Brother Ali	—N/a
"Elegant"	2024	DJ Rude One	—N/a
'Ice Water, Pt. 2"	2024	Flee Lord	Raised in the Sand
"Lord Knows What"	2025	Double A.B. & Dub Sonata	Alternate Media
"Piece Lee"	2025	Candungranjo	Non-album single
"Bladerunner"	2025	Jay Worthy, Sean House	Once Upon A Time 2
"Diamonds"	2025	Conway The Machine	You Can't Kill God With Bullets
"Lord Protect Me"	2026	The Alchemist & Budgie	The Good Book III
"Ya Heard"	2026	DJ Muggs & T.F.	Don't Call Me Lucky
"Peppers"	2026	Action Bronson	Planet Frog
