= A Martyr's Reward =

Studio album by Ka
- Released: August 13, 2021
- Genre: Hip-hop
- Length: 41:11
- Label: Iron Works
- Producer: Ka; Navy Blue; Preservation

Ka chronology
Descendants of Cain (2020)	A Martyr's Reward (2021)	Languish Arts / Woeful Studies (2022)

A Martyr's Reward is the sixth solo studio album by American rapper and record producer Kaseem "Ka" Ryan. It was released on August 13, 2021, through Iron Works Records. Production was handled by Ka himself, DJ Preservation and Navy Blue. It features guest appearances from Joi and Navy Blue.

== Critical reception ==
Professional ratings
Review scores
Source	Rating
AllMusic	4/5 stars
Beats Per Minute	84%
The Line of Best Fit	9/10
Pitchfork	8.3/10
Spectrum Culture	80%

A Martyr's Reward was met with generally favorable reviews from music critics.

Tim Sentz of Beats Per Minute found that the album "feels like the most complete Ka album yet, from the brighter production to the ever-evolving wordplay". Mano Sundaresan of Pitchfork stated: "one of rap's most inventive stylists surfaces from his memories to reflect on himself and his vocation, transforming his latest record into a searing, soulful gem in his catalog". AllMusic's David Crone wrote: "make no mistake, A Martyr's Reward is an excellent rap record -- but from one of the genre's most visionary poets, it can't help but feel slightly underbaked".

=== Accolades ===
Accolades for A Martyr's Reward
Publication	Accolade	Rank	Ref.
Beats Per Minute	BPM's Top 50 Albums of 2021	11	
Complex	The Best Albums of 2021	40	
Passion of the Weiss	The POW Best Albums of 2021	26	
Pitchfork	The 50 Best Albums of 2021	48	
Spin	The 30 Best Albums of 2021	26	
Stereogum	The 50 Best Albums of 2021	22	

== Track listing ==
A Martyr's Reward track listing
No.	Title	Producer(s)	Length
1.	"Everybody Up"	Ka	2:48
2.	"I Need All That"	Ka	3:51
3.	"Peace Peace Peace" (featuring Joi)	Ka	2:53
4.	"Sad to Say"	Ka	2:13
5.	"P W H"	Ka	2:16
6.	"I Notice"	Ka	3:21
7.	"Like Me"	Ka	4:09
8.	"We Living / Martyr" (featuring Navy Blue)	Navy Blue	4:32
9.	"Subtle"	DJ Preservation	2:14
10.	"With All My Heart"	Ka	2:59
11.	"Enough Praise / Recovering"	Ka	5:12
12.	"Be Grateful"	Ka	2:21
13.	"Having Nothin'"	Ka	2:22
Total length:			41:11

== Personnel ==
- Kaseem "Ka" Ryan – main artist, producer (tracks 1–7, 10–13)
- Joi Gilliam – vocals (track 3)
- Sage "Navy Blue" Elsesser – vocals & producer (track 8)
- Jean "Preservation" Daval – producer (track 9)
- Chris Pummill – engineering
- Charles Scott Harding – mixing
- Michael Fossenkemper – mastering
- Mark Shaw – design
