= Honor Killed the Samurai =

Honor Killed The Samurai

Studio album by Ka
- Released: August 13, 2016
- Studio: The End
- Genre: Hip hop
- Length: 36:07
- Label: Iron Works
- Producer: Ka

Ka chronology
Days With Dr. Yen Lo (2015)	Honor Killed The Samurai (2016)	Orpheus vs. the Sirens (2018)

Honor Killed the Samurai is the fourth solo studio album by American rapper and record producer Ka. It was released on August 13, 2016 via Iron Works Records. It was recorded at The End, and produced entirely by Ka himself.

== Critical reception ==
Professional ratings
Review scores
Source	Rating
HipHopDX	4.3/5
Pitchfork	8.0/10
RapReviews	8.5/10
Spin	8/10
Tom Hull	A−

Honor Killed the Samurai was met with widespread critical acclaim. At Album of the Year, which assigns a normalized rating out of 100 to reviews from mainstream publications, the album received an average score of 82 based on four reviews.

Hugh Leask of HipHopDX said, "Such menacing musical backdrops, coupled with Ka's hushed, raspy tone, ultimately imbue Honor Killed The Samurai with a quietly fearsome vibe which never lets up over the course of the album’s 10 tracks". RapReviews critic Patrick Taylor said that the album "has a cinematic feel to it. Like all of Ka's work, it is a quiet album that requires attention. He never raises his voice, there are no sung hooks, and there is nothing here that you could dance to" and also "some people might find Honor Killed the Samurai kind of boring. Those people are wrong, but it isn't an album that jumps out at you. It's an album that is all about skill and deliberation, and maintains Ka's rep as one of the more unique voices out there". Writing for Spin, Sheldon Pearce said "Unlike last year's abstract masterpiece, Days With Dr. Yen Lo — which rarely peppered his chants with outside noise — the arrangements here are heavier and purposeful". Paul A. Thompson of Pitchfork said, "With his latest, the Brownsville rapper cements himself as a preeminent stylist, his voice hushed but vicious, his production a grim rabbit hole of found sounds, minor keys, and few drums". Tom Hull said that the album "weaves samurai lessons into a more domestic thread, offering a sense of hard-earned accomplishment and brutal fates".

=== Accolades ===
Publication	List	Rank	Ref.
Complex	The 50 Best Albums of 2016	37	
Crack Magazine	Crack Magazine's 100 Greatest LPs of 2016	68	
Passion of the Weiss	The Best Albums of 2016	12	
Red Bull	25 Best Albums of 2016	18	
The Needle Drop	Top 50 Albums of 2016	43	
Tiny Mix Tapes	2016: Favorite 50 Music Releases	48	

== Track listing ==
No.	Title	Length
1.	"Conflicted"	3:20
2.	"Just"	3:40
3.	"That Cold and Lonely"	2:49
4.	"Mourn at Night"	3:34
5.	"$"	3:19
6.	"Destined"	3:50
7.	"Ours"	3:41
8.	"Illicit Fields"	3:25
9.	"Finer Things / Tamahagene"	5:19
10.	"I Wish (Death Poem)"	3:10
Total length:		36:07

== Personnel ==
- Kaseem "Ka" Ryan – main artist, producer
- Chris Pummill – recording
- Charles Scott Harding – mixing
- Tim Fodness – assistant mixing
- Michael Fossenkemper – mastering
- Mark Shaw – design
