= Days with Dr. Yen Lo =

Studio album by Ka, DJ Preservation
- Released: May 16, 2015
- Studio: The End
- Genre: Conscious hip hop
- Length: 39:07
- Label: Pavlov Institute Records
- Producer: DJ Preservation

Ka chronology
The Night's Gambit (2013)	Days with Dr. Yen Lo (2015)	Honor Killed the Samurai (2016)

Days with Dr. Yen Lo is a full-length studio rap album by the duo Dr. Yen Lo (Ka and DJ Preservation). The pair recorded the album at The End in Greenpoint, Brooklyn, New York, where it was released on May 16, 2015 via Pavlov Institute Records. The album was produced by Preservation with Tim Fodness as co-producer. The group's name, as well as the album title, were inspired by Khigh Dhiegh's character Dr. Yen Lo from John Frankenheimer's 1962 film The Manchurian Candidate.

The album was Ka's fourth studio album, following 2013s The Night's Gambit and preceding Honor Killed the Samurai released in 2016. The duo had previously collaborated together on 1200 B.C. an extended play released in 2014. The trailer for the album was released on February 12, 2015 via Ka's YouTube channel. The album features 12 tracks, all named "Day" followed by a number. A series of music videos were released for three of the tracks:"Day 0", "Day 3" and "Day 70", all directed by the duo.

== Themes and recording ==
Rapper Ka released The Night's Gambit in July 2013 before working on a collaborative Extended play with DJ Preservation in 2014 which released as 1200 B.C. The pair decided to name the record after Dr. Yen Lo, Khigh Dhiegh's character from the 1962 political and psychological thriller The Manchurian Candidate by John Frankenheimer. The album was written not to retrace the plot of the film but plays soundbites interspersing original lyrics.

Similar to The Night's Gambit this was recorded in The End in Greenpoint, Brooklyn, New York, Nathan Stevens from Spectrum Culture suggests the record is designed to be "anti-pop, meant to make listeners profoundly uncomfortable." Ka plays the part of the narrator and Preservation takes the position as director.

== Critical reception ==
Professional ratings
Review scores
Source	Rating
Pitchfork	8/10
Spectrum Culture	(85%)
Spin	8/10
Tiny Mix Tapes	5/5 marks
Tom Hull	A−

Days with Dr. Yen Lo was met with generally favorable reviews from critics. Samuel Diamond of Tiny Mix Tapes gave it maximum score saying that the album is "a work of art that feels fully realized on every level, from the Bigavelian harmonization of each seamlessly stacked Ka ad lib to the mix-mastery of each precisely-pitched Preservation sample". Critic Tom Hull said "rapper Ka and producer Preservation styled this concept album after the notorious Chinese doctor-hypnotist in The Manchurian Candidate, which also provides occasional snatches of dialog. The story strays but the music is hypnotic, with or without the monotone raps". Nathan Stevens of Spectrum Culture said that the album "builds the same world of anxiety, paranoia and treacherous twists as The Manchurian" and is "anti-pop-rap, meant to make listeners profoundly uncomfortable". Winston Cook-Wilson of Pitchfork said that the album "doesn't retrace the plot of the film or the book that inspired it, but instead engages with its themes, playing off of soundbytes interspersed between songs".

M.T. Richards of Spin stated that "This is an album about fear, death and strategic miscarriage in buckshot-logged East Brooklyn, where the carrot of job security is no incentive to hold out hope". American rapper Earl Sweatshirt highly praised the work, calling it the "album of 2015".

=== Accolades ===
Publication	List	Rank	Ref.
Rolling Stone	40 Best Rap Albums of 2015	9	
Stereogum	The 40 Best Rap Albums Of 2015	19	
The Village Voice	Pazz & Jop Lists 2015	139	
Tiny Mix Tapes	2015: Favorite 50 Music Releases	46	

== Track listing ==
No.	Title	Length
1.	"Day 0"	2:57
2.	"Day 811"	3:13
3.	"Day 3"	2:58
4.	"Day 1125"	2:04
5.	"Day 777"	3:17
6.	"Day 110"	4:06
7.	"Day 81"	2:57
8.	"Day 22"	3:22
9.	"Day 93"	4:06
10.	"Day 13"	3:59
11.	"Day 70"	2:50
12.	"Day 912"	3:18
Total length:		39:07

== Personnel ==
- Kaseem "Ka" Ryan – vocals
- Jean Daval – producer
- Chris Pummill – recording
- Charles Scott Harding – mixing
- Tim Fodness - assistant mixing
- Michael Fossenkemper – mastering
- Mark Shaw – design
- Rahkeim Calief Meyer – vocals (track 7)
