= Merci Beaucoup =

Merci Beaucoup may refer to:

- "Merci Beaucoup", a song by Pop Smoke from his 2021 album Faith
- "Merci Beaucoup", a 2001 song by Slick Idiot

== See also ==
- Marci Beaucoup, a 2013 album by Roc Marciano
