= Scott Harding =

Scott Harding may refer to:

- Scott Harding (footballer), Australian rules footballer
- Scott Harding (musician), Canadian hip-hop and jazz musician/producer
