= Orpheus vs. the Sirens =

Studio album by Hermit and the Recluse
- Released: August 18, 2018
- Studios: Seaside Lounge (Brooklyn, NY)
- Genre: Abstract hip-hop
- Length: 32:42
- Label: Obol for Charon
- Producer: Animoss

Ka chronology
Honor Killed the Samurai (2016)	Orpheus vs. the Sirens (2018)	Descendants of Cain (2020)

Orpheus vs. the Sirens is a studio album by Brownsville rapper Ka and Los Angeles producer Animoss, together known as Hermit and the Recluse. It was released on August 18, 2018 via Obol for Charon Records. Recording sessions took place at Seaside Lounge in Brooklyn. Production was handled entirely by Animoss. It features a single guest appearance from Citizen Cope.

The album was promoted by three music videos: "Sirens", directed by Alina Popescu, "Argo" and "Oedipus", both directed by Animoss and Ka.

== Critical reception ==
Professional ratings
Review scores
Source	Rating
Exclaim!	8/10
Pitchfork	8.0/10
RapReviews	8.5/10
Tiny Mix Tapes	4.5/5 marks

Orpheus vs. the Sirens was met with generally favorable reviews from critics. At Album of the Year, which assigns a normalized rating out of 100 to reviews from mainstream publications, the album received an average score of 83 based on five reviews.

Evan Coral of Tiny Mix Tapes said, "The self-mythologizing that Ka composes on Orpheus vs. the Sirens constitutes a minoritarian epic that resounds with the properly poetic catharsis that might purge the constraints from a life’s definition". Torii MacAdams of Pitchfork said, "In a twist, the Brownsville rapper projects the streetwise narratives of his youth through the lens of Greek mythology—an audacious move, but his hypnotic voice and evocative writing pull it off". M.T. Richards of Exclaim! said, "Ka's music will be a tough sell for hip-hop fans accustomed to baroque maximalism. Orpheus vs. the Sirens is almost confrontationally intimate; long stretches pass without any percussion at all".

=== Accolades ===
Publication	List	Rank	Ref.
Passion of the Weiss	The POW Best Albums of 2018	19	
The 405	The 405's Top 50 Albums of 2018	13	
Tiny Mix Tapes	2018: Favorite 50 Music Releases	43	

== Track listing ==
All tracks are written by Kaseem Ryan, except track 8 written with Clarence Greenwood.

No.	Title	Length
1.	"Sirens"	3:14
2.	"Fate"	3:08
3.	"Orpheus"	4:20
4.	"Atlas"	2:56
5.	"Argo"	3:26
6.	"Golden Fleece"	2:22
7.	"The Punishment of Sisyphus"	3:23
8.	"Hades" (featuring Citizen Cope)	3:17
9.	"Oedipus"	3:46
10.	"Companion of Artemis"	2:50
Total length:		32:42

== Personnel ==
- Kaseem "Ka" Ryan – vocals
- "Animoss" – producer
- Clarence Greenwood – featured artist (track 8)
- Chris Pummill – recording
- Charles Scott Harding – mixing
- CandIdo Casillas – additional ProTools editing
- Michael Fossenkemper – mastering
- JJ Golden – lacquer cut
- Mark Shaw – design
