= Descendants of Cain (album) =

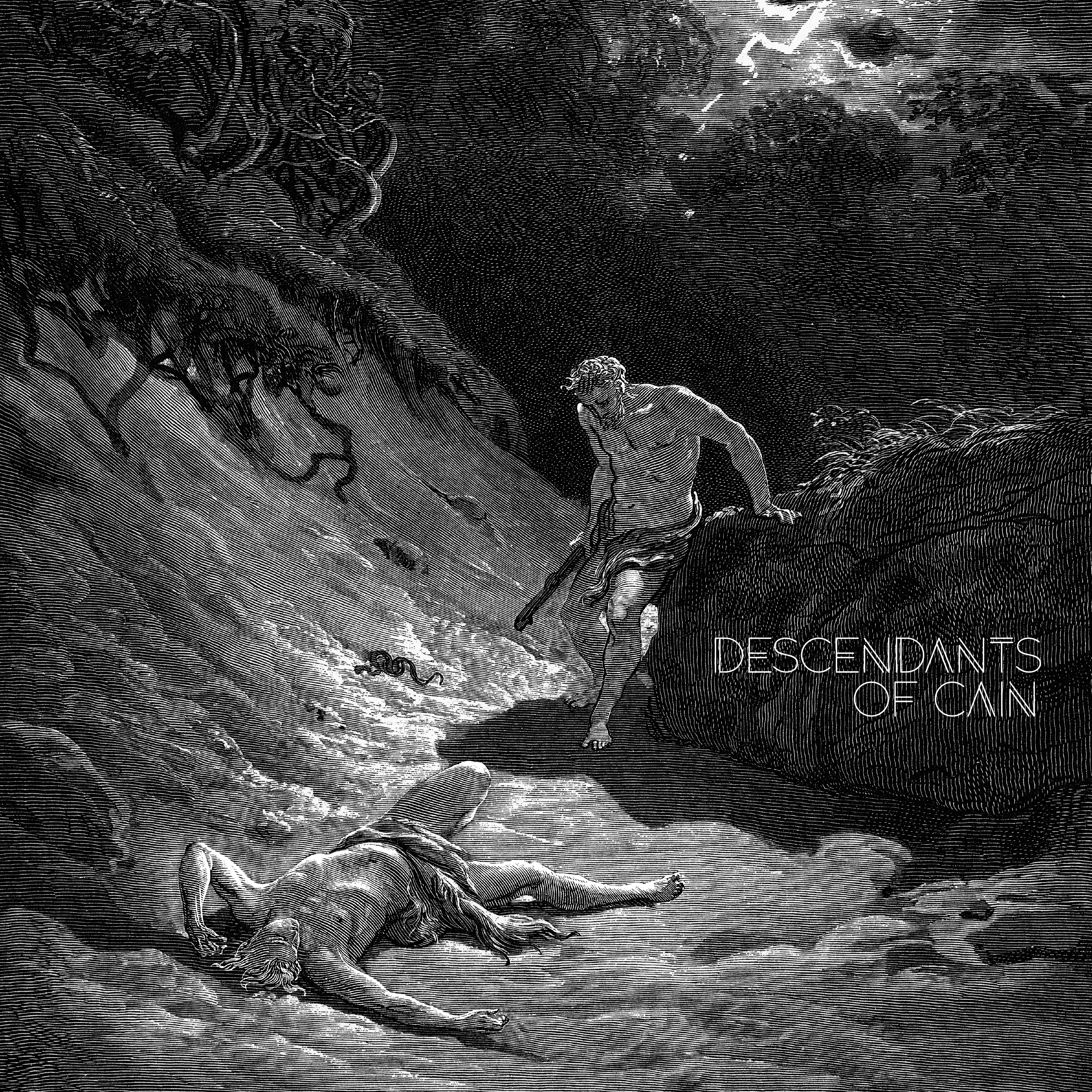

Studio album by Ka
- Released: May 1, 2020
- Studio: Virtue & Vice Studios (Brooklyn, NY)
- Genre: Underground hip hop; alternative hip hop
- Length: 32:55
- Label: Iron Works
- Producer: Animoss; Ka; DJ Preservation; Roc Marciano

Ka chronology
Orpheus vs. the Sirens (2018)	Descendants of Cain (2020)	A Martyr's Reward (2021)

Descendants of Cain is the fifth solo studio album by American rapper and record producer Kaseem "Ka" Ryan. It was released on May 1, 2020, via Iron Works Records. Recording session took place at Virtue & Vice Studios in Brooklyn. Production was handled by Ka himself and his frequent collaborators DJ Preservation, Animoss and Roc Marciano. It features a single guest appearance from Roc Marciano.

== Critical reception ==
Professional ratings
Aggregate scores
Source	Rating
Metacritic	85/100
Review scores
Source	Rating
AllMusic	4.5/5 stars
And It Don't Stop	A−
Beats Per Minute	79%
Pitchfork	8.1/10

Descendants of Cain was met with widespread critical acclaim. At Metacritic, which assigns a normalized rating out of 100 to reviews from mainstream publications, the album received an average score of 85 based on four reviews. The aggregator Album of the Year has the critical consensus of the album at a 80 out of 100, based on 4 reviews.

AllMusic's David Crone wrote: "Descendants of Cain proves an exceptional listen. Pairing Ryan's sublime lyricism with organic production and a precisely constructed concept, the MC's fifth project is a superb statement piece from one of rap's most ingenious poets". Paul A. Thompson of Pitchfork wrote: "It includes some of the most striking writing of Ka's career—the knottier verses and the blunter ones, too—and is utterly immersive, whole lifetimes of fear and pain and death and regeneration condensed into 33 minutes". Tim Sentz of Beats Per Minute wrote: "He may do all of this DIY, but it comes across with more heart than a lot of the tourists of the scene, and it shows in his powerful lyrics just how far he's come in this world". Robert Christgau called the rapper "a matter-of-fact realist" who has "never been averse to recollection or commentary, and this album assumes a didactic stance he puts across", and went on to say:

His basic aim here is to report on, not preach about, the devastation the street life leaves in its economically understandable, politically defensible, humanly unjustifiable wake—reporting that leaves room to articulate emotional alternatives, so that 'Had to use your fists to change your fiscal' evolves into 'Times the inner me cry from the imagery.' Yes he can translate his two-sided experience into a political goal as utopian as it is limited: 'Some equality, none in poverty, I'll be joyous then.' But by closing with 'I Love (Mimi, Moms, Kevs)' (wife, mother, departed homeboy) he makes clear that human connections are a precondition of whatever joy comes his way.

In a song review for "Sins of The Father", Dan-O of Freemusicempire wrote: "...I was very pleased to have retained the thick poetic brilliance of Ka on his seventh album while getting a little more balanced mixture of production. Some beats like "P.R.A.Y." are specifically tailored to be jagged and shocking but "Old Justice" is among the most soulful and listenable beats Ka has ever made himself".

=== Accolades ===
Accolades for Descendants of Cain
Publication	Accolade	Rank	Ref.
Pitchfork	The 50 Best Albums of 2020	35	
Spin	Spin's 30 Best Albums of 2020 – Mid-Year	—	
Stereogum	Stereogum's 50 Best Albums of 2020 – Mid-Year	10	

== Track listing ==
All tracks are written by Kaseem Ryan.

No.	Title	Producer(s)	Length
1.	"Every Now and Then"	Ka	3:34
2.	"Unto the Dust"	DJ Preservation	3:07
3.	"Patron Saints"	Ka	2:35
4.	"My Brother's Keeper"	Animoss	2:50
5.	"Solitude of Enoch"	Ka	3:39
6.	"The Eye of a Needle"	Ka	3:23
7.	"P.R.A.Y."	Ka	2:42
8.	"Land of Nod"	Ka	2:25
9.	"Sins of the Father" (featuring Roc Marciano)	Roc Marciano	2:46
10.	"Old Justice"	Ka	2:41
11.	"I Love (Mimi, Moms, Kev)"	DJ Preservation	3:13
Total length:			32:55

== Personnel ==
- Kaseem "Ka" Ryan – main artist, producer (tracks: 1, 3, 5–8, 10)
- Rahkeim Calief Meyer – featured artist & producer (track 9)
- Jean Daval – producer (tracks: 2, 11)
- Willis "Animoss" Williams – producer (track 4)
- Chris Pummill – recording
- Charles Scott Harding – mixing
- Michael Fossenkemper – mastering
- Mark Shaw – design
