= Beneficence =

Beneficence may refer to:

- Beneficence (hip-hop artist)
- Beneficence, a synonym for philanthropy
- Beneficence (ethics), a concept in medical ethics
- Beneficence (statue), a statue at Ball State University
- Procreative beneficence
- Order of Beneficence (Greece)
