= Stove God Cooks =

American rapper

- Also known as: Aaron Cook$; A-Train
- Born: Aaron Cook
- Origin: Syracuse, New York, U.S.
- Genres: Hip hop; gangsta rap; mafioso rap
- Occupations: Rapper; songwriter
- Instrument: Vocals
- Labels: The Conglomerate; Griselda; Babygrande

Aaron Cook, better known by his stage name Stove God Cooks, is an American rapper from Syracuse, New York. He is signed to Babygrande Records.

== Biography ==
Raised in Syracuse, New York by a musical family, Cooks and his mother taught a gospel group at his grandfather's church. His brother introduced him to hip-hop music, with the music of rappers such as Nas and Big Pun.

In 2015, Cooks signed to Busta Rhymes' record label The Conglomerate Entertainment, and was mentored by Busta throughout the rest of the 2010s and part of the 2020s, Busta then introduced Cooks to fellow rapper Roc Marciano, who solely produced his debut album Reasonable Drought in March 2020, which went on to be called one of the best albums of the 2020s. The album's release also established his stage name Stove God Cooks.

Cooks was signed to Westside Gunn's label Griselda Records, and made his debut with the label featuring on three songs on Gunn's album Flygod is an Awesome God 2 in July 2020. He went on to become a prolific feature artist in the Griselda collective, including a feature on Benny the Butcher's album Tana Talk 4, which was praised by basketball player Kevin Durant. Cooks is also signed to Babygrande Records. In 2024, he announced his Let Him Cook Tour. In July 2025, Cooks was featured on the track "F.I.C.O.", from Clipse's album Let God Sort Em Out.

== Discography ==
Studio albums

- Reasonable Drought (with Roc Marciano) (2020)
- If These Kitchen Walls Could Talk (with Roc Marciano) (2021)

EPs

- Stop Callin Me, I’m Cookin (Side A) (2024)
- MY SAUCONYS GLOWIN (with Westside Gunn) (2025)

Singles

- "Break The Pyrex" (with Roc Marciano) (March 27, 2020)
- "Dope" (April 23, 2021)
- "Run It Up" (July 30, 2021)
- "That's The Game" (September 23, 2021)
- "Melo Chip and a Brick" (February 8, 2024)
- "Carbone" (with Stoupe) (March 1, 2024)
- "We Ballin Again" (April 19, 2024)
- "Goat Stamp" (November 28, 2025)
- "El Pueblo" (December 5, 2025)
- "Welcome To My Garden" (with Swizz Beatz) (February 6, 2026)

=== Guest appearances ===
Song title	Year	Other artist(s)	Album
Daddy Chill$	2015	Busta Rhymes, J-Doe	The Return of the Dragon (The Abstract Went On Vacation)
"Ghost Musik"	2019	Conway The Machine, Busta Rhymes	Everybody Is F.O.O.D. 3
"Puff Daddy"	2019	Roc Marciano	Marcielago
"God Loves You"	2019	Roc Marciano	Marcielago
"Jose Canseco"	2020	Westside Gunn	Flygod Is An Awesome God 2
"One More Hit"	2020	Westside Gunn	Flygod Is An Awesome God 2
"Bubba Chuck"	2020	Westside Gunn	Flygod Is An Awesome God 2
"Frank Murphy"	2020	Westside Gunn, Flee Lord, Estee Nack, Elcamino	Who Made The Sunshine
"Starlife"	2020	CASSOWARY, Roc Marciano	Non-album single
"The Eye of Whorus"	2020	Roc Marciano	Mt. Marci
"Thousand Pills"	2020	Boldy James & Real Bad Man	Real Bad Boldy
"Collateral"	2020	Ransom & Nicholas Craven, Ché Noir	Crime Scenes
"The Rite"	2020	Ransom & Nicholas Craven	Crime Scenes
"Marcus Smart"	2021	Peter Rosenberg, Flee Lord	Real Late
"Opulence"	2021	Nicholas Craven	Craven N 3
"In The Kitchen"	2021	The Yutes	Non-album single
"Hand Made In Paris"	2021	Ru$h & Jay Nice, Tha God Fahim	FAMILI 2
"Diamond Dallas"	2021	Boldy James & The Alchemist	Bo Jackson
"Trim the Fat"	2021	Flee Lord & Roc Marciano	Delgado
"Mermaids"	2021	DJ Muggs & CRIMEAPPLE	Cartagena
"Mariota"	2021	Westside Gunn	Hitler Wears Hermes 8: Sincerely Adolf
"Vogue Cover"	2021	Westside Gunn	Hitler Wears Hermes 8: Sincerely Adolf
"Draymond"	2021	Westside Gunn, Rome Streetz	Hitler Wears Hermes 8: Sincerely Adolf
"RIGHT NOW"	2021	Westside Gunn, Jadakiss	Hitler Wears Hermes 8: Sincerely Adolf
"Westheimer"	2021	Westside Gunn, Boldy James, Sauce Walka	Hitler Wears Hermes 8: Sincerely Adolf
"Ostertag"	2021	Westside Gunn	Hitler Wears Hermes 8: Side B
"99 Avirex"	2021	Westside Gunn, AZ	Hitler Wears Hermes 8: Side B
"Breakfast In Pill Hill"	2021	Vic Spencer, Ironside Hex	Spencer for Higher 4
"Vlad TV"	2022	2 Chainz, Major Myjah, Symba	Dope Don’t Sell Itself
"Back 2x"	2022	Benny The Butcher	Tana Talk 4
"Trap Gods"	2022	Young Roddy	Never Question God
"Pot of Gold"	2022	Real Bad Man, The Alchemist, Boldy James, Evidence	On High Alert, Vol. 4
"Open Door"	2022	Boldy James & Real Bad Man, Rome Streetz	Killing Nothing
"Jesus Crack"	2022	Westside Gunn, Estee Nack	Peace "Fly" God
"Big Ass Bracelet"	2022	Westside Gunn	Peace "Fly" God
"Derrick Boleman"	2022	Westside Gunn	Peace "Fly" God
"Horses On Sunset"	2022	Westside Gunn	Peace "Fly" God
"297 Parkside"	2022	Black Soprano Family, Rick Hyde, Elcamino	Long Live DJ Shay
"W.O.L.F. (We Only Love Family)	2022	Joey Majors & GREA8GAWD, Eto, Rufus Sims	WOLF SZN
"Blow 4 Blow"	2022	Rome Streetz, Benny The Butcher	Kiss The Ring
"Hunnit Dolla Hiccup"	2022	Armani Caesar, Benny The Butcher	THE LIZ 2
"Shootouts In Soho"	2022	Westside Gunn, A$AP Rocky	10
"BDP"	2022	Westside Gunn, Rome Streetz	10
"Science Class"	2022	Westside Gunn, Busta Rhymes, Ghostface Killah, Raekwon	10
"God Is Love"	2022	Westside Gunn, Estee Nack, Keisha Plum	10
"Switches On Everything"	2022	Westside Gunn, Run The Jewels	10
"Red Death"	2022	Westside Gunn, Armani Caesar, Benny The Butcher, Conway The Machine, Jay Worthy, Robby Takac, Rome Streetz	10
"Speshal"	2022	38 Spesh & Harry Fraud	Beyond Belief
"Intro"	2023	French Montana & DJ Drama, Coke Boy Cheeze	Coke Boys 6: Money Heist Edition
"Life is Beautiful"	2023	Grafh & 38 Spesh, Bun B	Art of Words
"Cocaine County"	2023	Heem B$F & Black Soprano Family, Conway The Machine	From the Cradle to the Game
"Can't Stop"	2023	Statik Selektah, Nina Sky, Symba	Round Trip
"1989"	2023	Westside Gunn, DJ Drama	And Then You Pray For Me
"KITCHEN LIGHTS"	2023	Westside Gunn	And Then You Pray For Me
"House of GLORY"	2023	Westside Gunn	And Then You Pray For Me
"JD Wrist"	2023	Westside Gunn, Estee Nack, Trap-A-Holics	And Then You Pray For Me
"Babylon Bis"	2023	Westside Gunn, Kiesha Plum	And Then You Pray For Me
"DODGECARAVAN"	2023	Estee Nack & Mike Shabb	LIVE AT THE TABERNACLE
"One Foot In"	2024	Benny The Butcher	Everybody Can't Go
"Mutty"	2024	Conway The Machine	Slant Face Killah
"Another Full Tank In The Bronco"	2024	Smoke DZA & DJ RellyRell, Westside Gunn	You're All Welcome
"Unreal"	2024	Nicholas Craven, Ransom	Non-album single
"Del Lago"	2024	38 Spesh	Mother & Gun
"Still Praying"	2024	Westside Gunn & DJ Drama, Conway The Machine, Boldy James, Benny The Butcher	Still Praying
"BOSWELL"	2025	Westside Gunn, Estee Nack	12
"ADAM PAGE"	2025	Westside Gunn	12
"VEERT"	2025	Westside Gunn, Estee Nack	12
"055"	2025	Westside Gunn	12
"DUMP WORLD"	2025	Westside Gunn, Elijah Hooks	12
"B.T.L."	2025	ILLTone Beats & Black Soprano Family, Elcamino, OT The Real	The Outcome
"The Louvre"	2025	Statik Selektah, Westside Gunn, Rome Streetz, Joey Badass	Expensive Taste
"F.I.C.O."	2025	Clipse, Pusha T & Malice	Let God Sort Em Out
"BRIKOLAI VOLKOFF"	2025	Westside Gunn	HEELS HAVE EYES 2
"Bottega Trunks"	2025	Dave East	Karma 4
"MANKIND"	2025	Westside Gunn	HEELS HAVE EYES 3
"Accelerant"	2026	Jae Skeese & ILL Tone Beats, Conway The Machine	The Good Part, Vol. 1
"BLOWDYSSEUS	2026	Westside Gunn	Heelmatic
"SOCK A KNEE"	2026	Westside Gunn	Heelmatic
"TOMMY HEELFIGER"	2026	Westside Gunn	Heelmatic
"BAVETTES	2026	Westside Gunn	Heelmatic
