= The Coldest Profession =

EP by Roc Marciano and DJ Premier
- Released: August 8, 2025
- Recorded: 2025
- Studio: Kaufman Astoria Studios (New York)
- Genre: Hip-hop
- Length: 18:14
- Label: To the Top
- Producer: DJ Premier

Roc Marciano chronology
The Skeleton Key (2024)	The Coldest Profession (2025)

DJ Premier chronology
Hip Hop 50: Vol. 1 (2022)	The Coldest Profession (2025)	The Reinvention (2025)

Singles from The Coldest Profession
- 1. "Armani Section" Released: February 7, 2025; 2. "Prayer Hands" Released: August 1, 2025

The Coldest Profession is a collaborative EP by Roc Marciano and DJ Premier. It was released on August 8, 2025, by To the Top. The album incorporates hardcore hip-hop. In July 2025, the album's title and artwork were revealed.

== Track listing ==
All lyrics are written by Rahkeim Meyer and Christopher E. Martin; all music is composed by Martin.

No.	Title	Length
1.	"Arrival"	0:27
2.	"Armani Section"	3:03
3.	"Prayer Hands"	2:14
4.	"Good to Go"	2:40
5.	"Glory Hole"	2:37
6.	"RocMarkable"	2:20
7.	"Travel Fox"	3:18
8.	"Execution Style"	2:55
Total length:		18:34

== Personnel ==
Credits adapted from Tidal.

- Roc Marciano – vocals
- DJ Premier – production, drums
- Parks Vallely – mixing
- Nef – engineering
