= Imperius Rex =

Studio album by Sean Price
- Released: August 8, 2017
- Genre: Hip-hop
- Length: 51:13
- Label: Duck Down Music
- Producer: 4th Disciple; Alchemist; Crummie Beats; Dan The Man; DJ Skizz; Harry Fraud; Joe Cutz; Marco Polo; Marlon Colimon; Nottz; Stu Bangas

Sean Price chronology
Mic Tyson (2012)	Imperius Rex (2017)	86 Witness (2019)

Singles from Imperius Rex
- 1. "Rap Professor" Released: August 8, 2016; 2. "Definition of God" Released: March 17, 2017; 3. "Imperius Rex" Released: July 14, 2017

Imperius Rex is the fourth solo studio album by American rapper Sean Price. It was released on August 8, 2017, via Duck Down Music, exactly two years after his death, making it his first posthumous release. It features guest appearances from Bernadette Price, Buckshot, Foul Monday, Freeway, Ike Eyez, Inspectah Deck, Junior Reid, Method Man, MF Doom, Prodigy, Raekwon, Rim P, Rock, Ruste Juxx, Smif-N-Wessun, Styles P and Vic Spencer.

== Critical reception ==
Professional ratings
Aggregate scores
Source	Rating
Metacritic	87/100
Review scores
Source	Rating
Albumism	4.5/5 stars
AllMusic	4/5 stars
HipHopDX	4.1/5
RapReviews	9.5/10
Spectrum Culture	70%
XXL	XL

Imperius Rex was met with positive reviews. At Metacritic, which assigns a normalized rating out of 100 to reviews from mainstream publications, the album received an average score of 87, based on four reviews. The aggregator Album of the Year has the critical consensus of the album at an 81 out of 100, based on four reviews.

Dana Scott of HipHopDX stated: "This is an impressive showcase for his fans". Chris Gibbons of XXL said: "Imperius Rex is a worthy entry into the Sean Price canon, and proof that his voice will still live on in hip-hop well after his untimely passing". AllMusic's Paul Simpson said: "Nobody on the album overshadows Price, who sounds as forceful, commanding, and even as funny as ever".

=== Accolades ===
Publication	List	Rank	Ref.
Albumism	Albumism's 50 Best Albums of 2017	29	

== Track listing ==
No.	Title	Writer(s)	Producer(s)	Length
1.	"Imperius Rex"	Sean Price; Alan Maman	Alchemist	2:29
2.	"Dead or Alive" (featuring Bernadette Price)	S. Price; Bernadette Price	4th Disciple	2:55
3.	"Definition of God"	S. Price	Stu Bangas	3:09
4.	"Ape in His Apex" (featuring Ruste Juxx)	S. Price; Victor Evans	Crummie Beats	2:35
5.	"Apartheid" (featuring Buckshot and General Steele)	S. Price; Daryl Yates Jr.; Kenyatta Blake	Crummie Beats	3:16
6.	"Lord Have Mercy" (featuring Rim P and Vic Spencer)	S. Price; Karim Trejada	Joe Cutz	3:35
7.	"Negus" (featuring Ike Eyez and Doom)	S. Price; Daniel Dumile	Crummie Beats	3:40
8.	"Church Bells" (featuring Junior Reid)	S. Price	Crummie Beats	4:28
9.	"The 3 Lyrical Ps" (featuring Prodigy and Styles P)	S. Price; Albert Johnson; David Styles; Rory W. Quigley	Harry Fraud	3:36
10.	"Not97"	S. Price		1:32
11.	"Refrigerator P!"	S. Price	Dan The Man	3:15
12.	"Prisoner" (featuring Freeway)	S. Price; Marco Bruno	Marco Polo	4:18
13.	"Resident Evil"	S. Price; Marlon Colimon	Marlon Colimon	2:49
14.	"Clans & Clicks" (featuring Smif-N-Wessun, Rock, Method Man, Raekwon, Inspectah Deck and Foul Monday)	S. Price; Yates Jr.; Jamal Bush; Tekomin Williams	Nottz	5:30
15.	"Rap Professor"	S. Price; Zach Raemer	DJ Skizz	2:26
16.	"Price Family" (featuring Bernadette Price)	S. Price; B. Price	Crummie Beats	1:40
Total length:				51:13

== Charts ==
Chart (2017)	Peak position
US Billboard 200	192
US Independent Albums (Billboard)	8
