= The Night's Gambit =

Solo studio album by Kaseem Ka Ryan

Studio album by Ka
- Released: July 13, 2013
- Studio: The End
- Genres: East Coast hip hop; conscious hip hop
- Length: 39:03
- Label: Iron Works
- Producer: Ka

Ka chronology
Grief Pedigree (2012)	The Night's Gambit (2013)	Days With Dr. Yen Lo (2015)

The Night's Gambit is the third solo studio album by American rapper and record producer Kaseem "Ka" Ryan. It was released on July 13, 2013 via Iron Works Records. It was recorded at The End, and produced entirely by Ka himself. The album features the sole guest appearance from Roc Marciano.

== Critical reception ==
Professional ratings
Aggregate scores
Source	Rating
AnyDecentMusic?	79/100
Review scores
Source	Rating
HipHopDX	4/5
Pitchfork	8.0/10
PopMatters	7/10 stars
RapReviews	9/10
Rolling Stone	3.5/5 stars
Spin	9/10
Tom Hull	B+

The Night's Gambit was met with generally favorable reviews from critics. At AnyDecentMusic?, which assigns a normalized rating out of 100 to reviews from mainstream publications, the album received an average score of 79 based on six reviews. The aggregator Album of the Year has the critical consensus of the album at 82 out of 100, based on seven reviews.

Brandon Soderberg of Spin praised the album, saying it is "the best example yet of Ka's take-it-or-leave-it rap-auteurist style". RapReviews critic Patrick Taylor stated it is "an excellent album, and one of the best manifestations of grimey New York hip-hop". Nate Patrin of Pitchfork admired that "as a rapper/producer, he [Ka] has that finely-tuned awareness of how a track works from every angle". Rolling Stone reporter Jonah Weiner said, "Over the hypnotic, self-produced drones of his third solo album, Ka is an auteur with a hushed delivery worthy of Nineties stalwarts like Raekwon and Prodigy". Marshall Gu of PopMatters said, "the album's brevity -- clocking just under 40 minutes -- and his penchant for bookending each song with samples are both welcome blessings".

=== Accolades ===
Publication	List	Rank	Ref.
Complex	The 50 Best Albums of 2013	21	
Drowned in Sound	Drowned in Sound's Favorite Albums of 2013	11	
Fact	The 50 Best Albums of 2013	11	
NPR Music	NPR Music's 50 Favorite Albums of 2013	*	
Spin	Spin's 50 Best Albums of 2013	8	
The Needle Drop	Top 50 Albums of 2013	9	

== Track listing ==
All tracks are written by Kaseem Ryan.

No.	Title	Length
1.	"You Know It's About"	3:33
2.	"Our Father"	3:13
3.	"Jungle"	3:47
4.	"Barring the Likeness"	3:26
5.	"Nothing Is"	2:41
6.	"Soap Box" (featuring Roc Marciano)	3:37
7.	"Peace Akhi"	4:04
8.	"Knighthood"	3:20
9.	"30 Pieces of Silver"	3:30
10.	"I'm Ready"	3:52
11.	"Off the Record"	4:00
Total length:		39:03

== Personnel ==
- Kaseem "Ka" Ryan – main artist, producer
- Rahkeim Calief Meyer – featured artist (track 6)
- Chris Pummill – engineering
- Christos Tsantilis – mixing & mastering
- Mark Shaw – design & photography
