= Natural Elements (hip-hop group) =

American hip hop group

- Also known as: N.E.
- Origin: Baychester, Bronx, New York, U.S.
- Genres: Hip hop
- Years active: 1993-present
- Labels: Kings Link, Fortress Entertainment, Tommy Boy Records
- Members: L Swift, A-Butta, Mr. Voodoo
- Past members: Charlemagne, KA, Howie Smalls, Dante Pachino, The InTIMidator, G-Blass

Natural Elements are an American underground hip hop group from New York City, active since 1993.

== Origin ==
Brought together in 1993 under the direction of Charlemagne, Natural Elements began as a group consisting of solo artists Mr. Voodoo, L Swift, Ka, Howie Smalls, G-Blass, and the InTIMidator. In 1994, Natural Elements dropped its first 12" with "The EP" which was produced by Charlemagne under Fortress Entertainment. L Swift, Ka and Mr. Voodoo received the most attention initially. Soon after, Ka would voluntarily leave the group. This was due to feelings expressed during a public talk at the Red Bull Music Academy that he wasn't as good as the other two, and felt his presence in the group would hold them back. By 1995, A Butta joined the group and officially Natural Elements condensed into its modern-day trio.

== Recording history ==
After reforming the group into what was now the official Natural Elements, Mr. Voodoo, L Swift, and A-Butta began to record tracks together. With Charlemagne, their original goal before pursuing a major label was to build up Fortress Entertainment. As a side project, A-Butta and L Swift formed the duo "2Face", and released "NYC/Hey Hey Hey" under Blind Side Recordings in 1996. Natural Elements became an NYC underground hip-hop sensation with their presence on DJ Premier's "Reality Check 101", and appearances on radio shows. They became known for their incredible freestyles and their uncanny ability to flow one after another and finish each other's sentences, sometimes trading bars back to back like old school rap groups used to do. This "3-man weave" rhyme style was taught to them by Charlemagne and can still be heard in group tracks today. They became most famously recognized for their appearances on the Stretch and Bobbito Show, "The Underground Railroad", and The Halftime Show on New York University Radio. The group put out its first 12-inch in 1997 under Dolo Records with "Bust Mine" and "Paper Chase" which were also produced by Charlemagne.

During this time, rappers were beginning to get fed up with the lack of creative control given to the artists by their record labels. An indie rap movement began to flourish with Rawkus Records at the helm. Eventually, Natural Elements acquired a record deal with a major label, Tommy Boy Records. In 1998, N.E. released their first single "2 Tons/Live It Up" (Petawane singing the hook on 2 Tons) under their indie division called Tommy Boy Black Label. All three members put out various solo work, but no official albums were ever released as Tommy Boy continually shelved their debut album due to not knowing how to market and promote them. Issues between the group and label would soon lead to Natural Elements leaving Tommy Boy. The debut album was ultimately never released in spite of the hype it accumulated. In an interview, Mr. Voodoo stated "The Tommy Boy situation was hectic. We was suppose [sic] to have an album put out in 1999. First, halfway through the album our A&R was fired. We still were still on and finished the album but they kept sitting on it. We were like let us go but give us our masters. So we got 'em. A whole fuckin album that no one may ever hear." An unfinished and unofficial copy of the album with assorted songs eventually leaked onto the Internet, and thus received mixed reviews. The group eventually took a small hiatus and disbanded due to personal issues.

A decade later, a compilation album entitled "1999: 10 Year Anniversary" was finally released in 2009 under Kings Link Recordz to mostly critical praise from underground hip-hop critics, and contained many unreleased tracks that would have been on their original album. The main criticism with the album was that some of these unreleased tracks seemed to be unmastered, and others had subpar or dated commercial sounding beats that were crafted in the style of rap that was popular at the time, driven and forced onto them by Tommy Boy Records.

Besides their creativity and inventiveness in freestyles, Natural Elements were also known for their multi-syllable rhymes, vivid lyrical imagery, and their masterful battle rap style. Currently, numerous freestyles and other unreleased or rare material are viewed among hip-hop communities and on YouTube and torrent websites. In 2013, Chopped Herring Records was able to secure old DAT tapes found in the basement of a mother of an associate of Natural Elements. This led to a few previously unheard songs being released and pressed into limited edition vinyl records; although the songs are of lower quality than typical releases as they were ripped from demo tapes. Natural Elements recently decided to reform the group and has been putting out new material under their new monikers. Charlemagne is also back to producing songs for the group. On March 10, 2014, they released a digital EP entitled "The NEp". A full-length album is expected. Solo work by all three members has also continued. Former member KA has also been met with unexpected critical acclaim by Rolling Stone, NPR and Spin for his 2013 solo release "The Night's Gambit."

== Members ==
=== A-Butta ===
Anthony Cruz a.k.a. A-Butta was raised in West Harlem and is of Puerto Rican descent. He was introduced to L Swift, Mr. Voodoo, and Charlemagne in the mid-1990s by DJ Mayhem. Over the years, he has been featured in almost every post-1994 Natural Elements song. He worked on a hip-hop/punk fusion project with his new rock band featuring Japanese musicians Butch, Yoshi, and Dai entitled "Bullet Proof Junkies." Recently, he's put out two solo albums with a unique and fresher style then his past work, which compiles more punk rock, EDM, nu-metal, pop and neo-soul musical elements. "Vaudeville Spit" is a double CD that was released in 2010 under Kingz Link Recordz. The fan dedication track "Thank You" had a video produced for it that pushed Cruz to finally earn MTV rotation. His newest work was in 2013, titled "Fear and Loathing in New York City", a free digital album released and made available on his website. The biggest hit from this album was "Enjoy the Ride," which also landed him play on MTV and opened the doors for the entire group in terms of media coverage for a comeback.

=== L Swift ===
L Swift (L. Lesmond) who now goes by the name Swigga Da Don, was born in the Caribbean in the late 1970s and grew up in the Northeast Bronx. At just twenty years old, he along with the other group members were signed to Tommy Boy Records. He released several independent singles such as "Howz It Goin Down" and "Ride This". After the break-up with the record label and the shelving of their debut album along with other personal hardships, he was hospitalized in 2000 after trying to commit suicide by overdosing on a mixture of forty prescription pills. Over the past couple of years under the name Swigga, he has released numerous mixtapes as well as projects with his new group "Northeast Wildcats" which consists of Eddie Brock and Al Giddy. He has also developed the record label Agatha Music in dedication to his mother who died from cancer in 1991. Recently, Swigga has continued to drop tracks on the internet mostly produced by Scram Jones, and has collaborated with Anthony Cruz on both of his solo albums.

=== Mr. Voodoo ===
Growing up in Brooklyn, Mr. Voodoo (Agu Obiakor) starting rapping in the mid-1980s. Throughout his career, Mr. Voodoo released many singles such as "Come Off Hard" (1994) and the "Lyrical Tactics" 12" in 1996, which featured another popular track entitled "Hemlock". Mr. Voodoo now goes by his given name Agu, which was also the name he used when he was the co-host on the Underground Railroad in the early 1990s. Mr. Voodoo co-founded Hemlock Records in 2002. Agu has also been recording solo tracks since the break up of Natural Elements, though no big solo plans have been revealed so far.

== Discography ==
- 1994: "The EP" (12") - (Fortress Entertainment)
- 1997: "Bust Mine/Paper Chase" (12") - (Dolo Records)
- 1998: "2 Tons/Live It Up" (Single) - (Tommy Boy Black Label)
- 1999: "Live It Up Part 2 The Remixes" (12", Promo) - (Tommy Boy Black Label)
- 2005: "EP" (12") - (Word Of Mouth)
- 2009: 1999: 10 Year Anniversary (CD, Album) - (Kings Link Recordz)
- 2011: "The Lost Demos Ep Vol 1" (Vinyl EP) - (Chopped Herring Records)
- 2012: "Lost Demos and Instrumentals" (Vinyl EP) - (Chopped Herring Records)
- 2014: "The Nep" (Digital EP) - (NEw ENTerprise Records)
- 2024: "Alive and Well" (Digital Single) - (NE4LIFEnt)
- 2026: "ALIGNMENT" (LP, CD, Cassette, Album) - (Fat Beats)

=== Appearances ===
- 1997: "Lyrical Tactics" - (Haze Presents: New York Reality Check 101) - (Payday, FFRR)
- 1997: "Bust Mine" - (Lesson 1) - (Dolo Records)
- 1997: "Freestyle", "Bust Mine" - (My Definition Of Hip-Hop Vol.2) - (Flavor Records)
- 1997: "Strategy" - (Raidermen - Top Dollar/Strategy 12") - (Raidermen Entertainment)
- 1998: "Tri-Boro" - (Hip-Hop Independents Day Vol. 1) - (Wreck Records, Nervous Records)
- 1998: "Mayday" - (Lyricist Lounge Volume One) - (Rawkus)
- 1998: "Bust Mine" - (Tags Of The Times) - (Mary Joy Recordings)
- 1999: "The Promo" - (#62 - Ready For Impact?) - (Tape Kingz)
- 1999: "Live It Up" - (Black Mask - Music From The Original Motion Picture) - (Tommy Boy Music)
- 1999: "2 Tons" - (CMJ New Music Monthly Volume 73, September 1999) - (College Music Journal)
- 1999: "2-Tons" - (Dub Sessions Vol. 01) - (P-Jays Recordings)
- 1999: "2-Tons" - (Competition Is None) - (Staple)
- 2000: "A Monster Has Been Born" - (CJ Recording)
- 2000: "The Promo" - (Alien Food) - (Not On Label)
- 2000: "Live It Up (Pt. 2)" - (Black Label: Hip Hop 101) - (Tommy Boy Black Label)
- 2000: "911 Intro" - (Brainwash) - (Not On Label)
- 2000: "Live It Up" - (Tommy Boy Presents: Architects Of Culture) - (HHC Magazine, Tommy Boy Music)
- 2003: "Paper Chase" - (Thé Dansant Des Anciens Elèves) - (Institubes)
- 2004: "Definitely" - (SpitKicker Presents DJ Crossphada: The Next Spit Volume 4) - (SpitKicker)
- 2006: "I Mean This" - (Crime Rhymes) - (Not On Label)
- 2006: "Magnetic" - (Straight From Underground (Best Of 1997)) - (Not On Label)
