= The Thief Next to Jesus =

Studio album by Ka
- Released: August 19, 2024
- Studio: Studio City Sound
- Genre: Experimental hip-hop
- Length: 35:27
- Label: Iron Works
- Producer: Ka

Ka chronology
Languish Arts / Woeful Studies (2022)	The Thief Next to Jesus (2024)

Singles from The Thief Next to Jesus
- 1. "Such Devotion" Released: August 19, 2024

The Thief Next to Jesus is the ninth and final studio album by American rapper Ka, released on August 19, 2024, through Ka's own label Iron Works.

== Background ==
Ka surprise released The Thief Next to Jesus exclusively for purchase for $20 through his website on August 19, 2024, with only a music video for the single "Such Devotion" being made available for streaming. The album's release was announced on Instagram, with Ka writing: "Thank you for still being interested after my 2 years away. I really wanted to come back with something meaningful. This one holds a special place for me. Hope it moves you in the same way." The Thief Next to Jesus was later made available for streaming on September 19, 2024.

The Thief Next to Jesus is Ka's last known recording; he died on October 12, 2024, at the age of 52.

== Critical reception ==
Professional ratings
Review scores
Source	Rating
AllMusic	4/5
The Needle Drop	9/10
Pitchfork	8.1/10

The Thief Next to Jesus received little attention upon release, but was well-regarded by critics. Pitchfork writer Matthew Ritchie gave the album an 8.1/10, praising the use of gospel samples along with its themes of Christianity and its links to African Americans. Ritchie wrote, "Breaking down the tools used to oppress Black folks has always been at the forefront of Ka's writing, and the frank manner in which he parses and critiques the Black American connection to Christianity here produces stunning moments." Anthony Fantano called the album "incredible and highly impressive" and gave it a rating of 9/10, praising the album's production and lyricism. Fantano also highlighted the themes of the album, discussing how Ka's faith was affected deeply through "years of witnessing and experiencing trauma as well as injustice".

Vulture included the album on its list of the "Best Albums of 2024 (So Far)".

=== Accolades ===
Year-end lists for The Thief Next to Jesus
Publication	List	Rank	Ref.
Beats Per Minute	BPM's Top 50 Albums of 2024	19	
BrooklynVegan	BrooklynVegan's Top 50 Albums of 2024	48	
Complex	The 50 Best Albums of 2024	6	
The Fader	The 50 Best Albums of 2024	12	
The Needle Drop	Top 50 Albums of 2024	5	
Okayplayer	The 50 Best Albums of 2024	—	
Paste	The 100 Best Albums of 2024	47	
Pitchfork	The 50 Best Albums of 2024	24	
The Quietus	The Quietus Albums of the Year 2024	83	
Stereogum	The 50 Best Albums of 2024	18	
The Wire	The Wire's Releases of the Year 2024	14	

== Track listing ==
No.	Title	Length
1.	"Bread, Wine, Body, Blood"	2:53
2.	"Beautiful"	3:00
3.	"Tested Testimony"	2:14
4.	"Borrowed Time"	2:47
5.	"Collection Plate"	1:52
6.	"Broken Rose Window"	3:06
7.	"God Undefeated"	2:03
8.	"Soul and Spirit"	1:59
9.	"Lord Have Mercy"	2:36
10.	"Such Devotion"	2:29
11.	"Cross You Bear"	2:23
12.	"Fragile Faith"	2:28
13.	"Hymn and I"	2:33
14.	"True Holy Water"	2:57
Total length:		35:27

== Personnel ==
- Ka – vocals, production
- Michael Fossenkemper – mastering
- Scotty Hard – mixing
- Connor Schultze – recording
- Preservation – additional Pro Tools editing
- Mark Shaw – design
