= Marciology =

Studio album by Roc Marciano
- Released: March 29, 2024
- Genre: Underground hip-hop
- Length: 45:36
- Language: English
- Label: Marci Enterprises
- Producer: The Alchemist; Animoss; Roc Marciano

Roc Marciano chronology
Nothing Bigger Than the Program (2023)	Marciology (2024)	The Skeleton Key (2024)

A lot of haunted shit happens in Long Island, for sure; we have the Amityville Horror house here too! The spooky haunted sound isn't intentional though, it's more like… I think that that's just happening subconsciously. Because when you're writing music more like a movie score, you're trying to bring people into those dark places, to those emotional spaces, and looking for music and words that describe the weirder feelings. When you talk about Lake Ronkonkoma, it's crazy because the indigenous names are still attached to a lot of the places like that in Long Island. And, I definitely feel that American Indian philosophy is in alignment with a lot of the things I feel spiritually and believe around Black people really being indigenous to all parts of the earth. If you hear American Indian sounds [in my music], then I am sure it's a subconscious reflection of my surroundings.

—Marciano on horrorcore sounds in his music

Marciology is the ninth studio album by American rapper and producer Roc Marciano, released on March 29, 2024, through Pimpire Records and Marci Enterprises. The album marks his first solo release in four years since 2020's Mt. Marci. It was proceeded by one single, "Gold Crossbow", which was released on March 21, 2024. Production was handled primary by Marciano himself, with additional production from Animoss and the Alchemist. The album contains guest appearances from Larry June, Crimeapple, T.F, Flee Lord, Jay Worthy, Knowledge the Pirate and GREA8GAWD. Marciology received positive reviews from critics, noting its eerie, neo-noir inspired soundscapes and sharp, witty rhymes.

== Reception ==
According to the review aggregator Metacritic, Marciology received "generally favorable reviews" based on a weighted average score of 75 out of 100 from 5 critic scores. At BrooklynVegan, Andrew Sacher stated that Marciano's style is consistent with "a hefty helping of eerie boom bap production and sinister bars that sound straight out of mid '90s New York City", but the lyrical content will engage listeners and he "makes every syllable count"; this album was included in the 10 best rap albums of the first half of the year and 40 best albums overall from the site. At HipHopDX, Will Schube scored this release a 4 out of 5, stating that Marciano's "instrumentals are diamond-sharp and neo-noir bleak, while his rhymes are as tight as a rubber band ball" and "bar for bar, no one blends extravagance with economy like he does, parceling out morsels of brags that suggest generational wealth, feeding just enough at a time to keep 'em hooked and wanting more". Editors at Pitchfork scored this release 8.1 out of 10 and critic Dash Lewis declared Marciano "the godfather of underground rap" for his ability to mix 1990s influences with modern sounds to create his own style, making this "the decoder ring for an entire generation of hip-hop". Editors at Rolling Stone gave this release a "Hear This" label and critic Andre Gee wrote that "Marciology again demonstrates why Roc is one of rap's most unique voices" with "his slick diction and knack for stacking multi-syllabic rhymes together" and highlights specific tracks and vocal deliveries that show "an expert example of mastering the rules to break them". Grant Jones of RapReviews wrote: "like any successful artist, he's willing to take risks, and he's doing it more than I'd expect this far into his career. He's singing on "Gold Crossbow" for a start, an irresistible set of drums that slap you round the face, with a lovely piece of piano that gives it an underlying sense of horror".

== Track listing ==
All songs are produced by Roc Marciano except where noted.

Marciology track listing
No.	Title	Writer(s)	Producer(s)	Length
1.	"Marciology"	Rakheim Calief Meyer		2:54
2.	"Goyard God"	Meyer	Animoss	3:33
3.	"Gold Crossbow"	Meyer		3:14
4.	"True Love"	Meyer		2:58
5.	"Bebe's Kids"	Meyer		2:16
6.	"Bad JuJu" (featuring Larry June)	Meyer; Larry Eugene Hendricks III; Alan Maman	The Alchemist	3:17
7.	"Tapeworm"	Meyer; Animoss	Animoss	4:07
8.	"Killin' Spree" (featuring Crimeapple)	Meyer; Sebastian Vasco		3:07
9.	"Went Diamond"	Meyer		2:55
10.	"Higher Self" (featuring T.F & Flee Lord)	Meyer; Mychal Hatch; David Cordova; Maman	The Alchemist	3:33
11.	"LeFlair"	Meyer		2:21
12.	"On The Run" (featuring Jay Worthy)	Meyer; Jeffrey Sidhoo		3:08
13.	"Larry Bird" (featuring GREA8GAWD and Knowledge the Pirate)	Meyer; Richard Iverson; Tosh Edward Smith		4:30
14.	"Floxxx"	Meyer		3:56
Total length:				45:36

== Personnel ==
- Roc Marciano – instrumentation, rapping, production, executive production
- The Alchemist – production on "Bad Juju" and "Higher Self"
- Animoss – production on "Goyard God" and "Tapeworm"
- Todd Cooper – mixing on "Bad Juju"
- CRIMEAPPLE – rapping on "Killin' Spree"
- Flee Lord – rapping on "Higher Self"
- GREA8GAWD – rapping on "Larry Bird"
- Larry June – rapping on "Bad Juju"
- Knowledge the Pirate – rapping on "Larry Bird"
- Eddie Sancho – mixing on "True Love"
- T.F – rapping on "Higher Self"
- Josué Thomas – executive production
- Jay Worthy – rapping on "On the Run"
- Trevor Wright – mixing on "Marciology", "Goyard God", "Gold Crossbow", "Bebe's Kids", "Tapeworm", "Killin' Spree", "Went Diamond", "Higher Self", "Leflair", "On the Run", "Larry Bird", and "Floxxx"

== See also ==
- 2024 in American music
- 2024 in hip-hop
- List of 2024 albums
