= RR2: The Bitter Dose =

Studio album by Roc Marciano
- Released: February 27, 2018
- Genre: East Coast hip-hop; gangsta rap
- Length: 48:10
- Label: Marci Enterprises
- Producer: Animoss; Don Cee; Elemnt; Roc Marciano

Roc Marciano chronology
Sabbath (2017)	RR2: The Bitter Dose (2018)	Warm Hennessy (2018)

RR2: The Bitter Dose is the fifth studio album by American hip-hop artist Roc Marciano, released on February 27, 2018, by Marci Enterprises. The album is a sequel to Marciano's previous studio album Rosebudd's Revenge (2017). Marciano produced most of the album, with additional work by Elemnt, Animoss, and Don Cee. The album features guest appearances from rappers Action Bronson and Knowledge the Pirate.

== Release ==
Marciano released RR2: The Bitter Dose at first exclusively on his website as a $30 digital download. It was later released on streaming services on March 9, 2018.

== Critical reception ==
Professional ratings
Review scores
Source	Rating
Pitchfork	8.0/10
Robert Christgau	(3-star Honorable Mention)

Philip Mylnar of Pitchfork praised the album, stating that it "feels like a restatement of Roc Marci's core principles, recited in the hallowed style of reading from a religious scripture". Rajin of Extraordinary Nobodies opined that the album "displays Roc Marciano at his most ambitious" and that it was "his most innovative work" since Marcberg (2010).

Robert Christgau named "Corniche" and "The Sauce" as highlights and wrote: "Complex rhymes, organic textures, well-felt soul samples, and a few deft cameo changeups render this particular lucre quest so entertaining it's almost interesting."

=== Year-end lists ===
Select year-end rankings of RR2: The Bitter Dose
Publication	List	Rank	Ref.
Dead End Hip Hop	Staff Writers Pick: Top Ten Albums of 2018	—	
Hip Hop Golden Age	The Best Hip Hop Albums of 2018	27	

== Track listing ==
RR2: The Bitter Dose track listing
No.	Title	Producer	Length
1.	"Respected"	Elemnt	2:49
2.	"Tent City"	Roc Marciano	3:04
3.	"Bohemian Grove" (featuring Knowledge the Pirate)	Animoss	3:45
4.	"Corniche" (featuring Action Bronson)	Roc Marciano	3:09
5.	"C.V.S." (featuring Knowledge the Pirate)	Don Cee	2:41
6.	"Saks Fifth"	Roc Marciano	3:03
7.	"Major League"	Don Cee	3:38
8.	"Bedspring King"	Roc Marciano	3:50
9.	"The Sauce"	Roc Marciano	3:15
10.	"Happy Endings"	Animoss	4:35
11.	"Kill You"	Roc Marciano	4:28
12.	"67 Lobby"	Elemnt	3:21
13.	"Muse"	Roc Marciano	2:50
14.	"Pimp Smack Shit"	Roc Marciano	0:33
15.	"Power"	Roc Marciano	3:09
Total length:			48:10
