= Vic Spencer =

American rapper

- Born: Victor Terrell Spencer; September 23, 1981 (age 44); Chicago, Illinois, U.S.
- Genres: Hip hop
- Occupations: Rapper, youth advocate
- Years active: 2009–present
- Label: Old Fart Luggage

Victor "Vic" Terrell Spencer (born September 23, 1981), also known by his stage name "Vic Spencer", is an American rapper from Chicago, Illinois. He has worked with Sean Price, Ghostface Killah, Twista, Roc Marciano, Denmark Vessey, and many other artists/musicians. In 2017, he was featured on the Twista album Crook County, and Sean Price's album Imperius Rex. In April, 2018 he contributed a track on a Denmark Vessey album, produced by Earl Sweatshirt.

== Discography ==
- 2015 – The Cost of Victory
- 2016 – Dead
- 2016 – Who the Fuck Is Chris Spencer?? (with Chris Crack)
- 2016 – St. Gregory
- 2016 – The Ghost of Living (with Big Ghost Ltd.)
- 2017 – VicTree EP
- 2018 – Spencer for Higher (with Sonnyjim)
- 2018 – A Smile Killed My Demons
- 2018 – Duffle of Gems
- 2018 – Stupid
- 2019 – Spencer for Higher 2 (with Sonnyjim)
- 2019 – Nothing Is Something (with Tree)
- 2019 – Bah Wounds
- 2020 – Psychological Cheat Sheet
- 2020 – No Shawn Skemps
- 2020 - Spencer for Higher 3
- 2020 – Rather Be a Real One
- 2021 – Psychological Cheat Sheet 2
- 2021 – Legend Laws of Power
- 2021 – Brainstem Factory
- 2021 – Spencer for Higher 4
- 2022 – Still Here
- 2022 – Mudslide
- 2022 – Psychological Cheat Sheet 3
- 2022 – IMPACT (I Must Punch a Car Today)
- 2023 – If George Bush Was Cool
