= Rosebudd's Revenge =

Studio album by Roc Marciano
- Released: February 21, 2017
- Recorded: 2016–17
- Genre: East Coast hip-hop
- Length: 54:50
- Label: Marci Enterprises
- Producer: Roc Marciano (also exec.); Knxwledge; The Arch Druids; Mushroom Jesus; Modus Op; Animoss

Roc Marciano chronology
Marci Beaucoup (2013)	Rosebudd's Revenge (2017)	RR2: The Bitter Dose (2018)

Rosebudd's Revenge is the fourth studio album by American rapper Roc Marciano. It was independently released on February 21, 2017, by Marci Enterprises. The album was produced by The Arch Druids, Mushroom Jesus, Modus Op, Knxwledge, Animoss and Roc Marciano. The album features guest appearances by frequent collaborators Ka and Knowledge the Pirate.

== Background and promotion ==
On April 19, 2016, Marciano announced Rosebudd's Revenge on his social media. It was his first release since Marci Beaucoup in 2013. It was named for a pimp.

On February 27, 2018, Marciano released a sequel, RR2: The Bitter Dose.

== Critical reception ==
Professional ratings
Aggregate scores
Source	Rating
Metacritic	83/100
Review scores
Source	Rating
HipHopDX	4.2/5
Pitchfork	8.0/10
Tiny Mix Tapes	4.5/5 stars
RapReviews	7/10

Rosebudd's Revenge achieved widespread praise from music critics. At Metacritic, which assigns a weighted average score out of 100 to reviews from mainstream critics, the album received an average score of 83 based on 6 reviews, indicating "universal acclaim".

Marciano's writing on the album received particular commendation. Paul A. Thompson of Pitchfork rated the album an 8.0/10, describing it as "endlessly, almost impossibly entertaining" and wrote that Marciano "remains one of rap's most brilliant stylists, the kind of artist who can make you wear out your rewind button despite being old enough to remember when you could wear out a rewind button". Samuel Diamond of Tiny Mix Tapes remarked that it "packs a novel's worth of imagery, mood, characterization, conflict and theme into practically every line". Hugh Leask rated the album a 4.2/5, saying "Rosebudd's Revenge's quiet-storm menace makes for a surreptitiously potent punch of heavyweight Hip Hop". Grant Jones of RapReviews rated the album a 7/10, saying "[Marciano's] vocals lack the razor sharp potency he had on earlier projects. The over-the-top hyper-lyrical Roc Marciano is here and well, but his AR-15 isn’t as finely aimed".

=== Accolades ===
Publication	Accolade	Rank	Ref.
Stereogum	50 Best Albums of 2017	48	

== Track listing ==
Rosebudd's Revenge track listing
No.	Title	Producer	Length
1.	"Move Dope"	Mushroom Jesus	3:40
2.	"Rosebudd's Revenge"	Don C of The Arch Druids	3:23
3.	"History"	Animoss	2:16
4.	"Better Know"	Roc Marciano	4:03
5.	"No Smoke" (featuring Knowledge the Pirate)	Knxwledge	3:43
6.	"Gunsense"	Don C of The Arch Druids	5:02
7.	"Killing Time"	Roc Marciano	3:26
8.	"Burkina Faso"	Animoss	3:15
9.	"Marksmen" (featuring Ka)	Animoss	3:03
10.	"Herringbone"	Roc Marciano	2:48
11.	"Pimp Arrest"	Roc Marciano	3:08
12.	"Pray 4 Me"	Roc Marciano	5:11
13.	"Here I Am"	Roc Marciano	5:05
14.	"Already"	Modus Op	3:55
15.	"Pig Knuckles"	Roc Marciano	2:52
Total length:			54:50
