= Kaos (DJ Muggs and Roc Marciano album) =

Studio album by DJ Muggs and Roc Marciano
- Released: October 15, 2018
- Genre: East Coast hip-hop
- Length: 35:12
- Label: Soul Assassins
- Producer: DJ Muggs

DJ Muggs chronology
Soul Assassins: Dia del Asesinato (2018)	Kaos (2018)	Hells Roof (2019)

Roc Marciano chronology
Behold a Dark Horse (2018)	Kaos (2018)	Pimpstrumentals (2018)

Singles from Kaos
- 1. "Shit I'm On" Released: October 5, 2018

Kaos (stylized in all caps) is a collaborative studio album by American hip-hop producer DJ Muggs and hip-hop artist Roc Marciano, released on October 15, 2018, via Soul Assassins Records. The album is produced entirely by Muggs and features no guest appearances.

== Background and release ==
Kaos was announced on October 5, 2018, with the release of the single "Shit I'm On".

The album was released on October 15, 2018, as a $25 digital download on Muggs' website. It was released on streaming services on October 19, 2018.

== Critical reception ==
Professional ratings
Review scores
Source	Rating
Hip Hop Golden Age	7.5/10
Underground Hip Hop Blog	9/10

Kaos received positive reviews from music critics. Will Gotsegen of Spin called the album "a partnership in every sense of the word", and gave particular praise to the track "Dolph Lundgren". Brandon King of Hip Hop Golden Age said that despite the album being "a fairly short project, there’s enough heat to melt mountain snow here", and highlighted the tracks "Dolph Lundgren", "Aunt Bonnie" and "Shit I'm On".

=== Year-end lists ===
Select year-end rankings of Kaos
Publication	List	Rank	Ref.
Complex	The Best Albums of 2018	33	
Hip Hop Golden Age	The Best Hip Hop Albums of 2018	19	

== Track listing ==
Kaos track listing
No.	Title	Length
1.	"Kaos Theme"	1:48
2.	"Dolph Lundgren"	3:44
3.	"White Dirt"	3:45
4.	"The E Train"	3:13
5.	"Aunt Bonnie"	3:59
6.	"Rolls Royce Rugs"	3:04
7.	"Caught a Lick"	2:00
8.	"Wild Oats"	3:12
9.	"Shit I'm On"	4:12
10.	"Wormhole"	6:15
Total length:		35:21
