= Reloaded (Roc Marciano album) =

Studio album by Roc Marciano
- Released: November 13, 2012
- Recorded: 2010–12
- Genre: Hip-hop
- Length: 54:36
- Label: Decon
- Producer: Roc Marciano; The Alchemist; Ray West; Q-Tip; The Arch Druids

Roc Marciano chronology
Marcberg (2010)	Reloaded (2012)	Marci Beaucoup (2013)

Reloaded is the second studio album by American hip-hop recording artist Roc Marciano, released on November 13, 2012, by Decon Records. Marciano produced most of the album and was assisted by The Alchemist, Ray West, Q-Tip, and The Arch Druids. The album features guest contributions by rappers Ka and Knowledge the Pirate.

== Critical reception ==
Professional ratings
Aggregate scores
Source	Rating
Metacritic	83/100
Review scores
Source	Rating
AllMusic	4/5 stars
Consequence of Sound	3.5/5 stars
Exclaim!	9/10
HipHopDX	4/5
Pitchfork	8.1/10
Q	4/5 stars
RapReviews	9/10
Rolling Stone	3.5/5 stars
Spin	9/10
XXL	(XL)

At Metacritic, which assigns a normalized rating out of 100 to reviews from mainstream critics, the album received an average score of 83, which indicates "universal acclaim", based on 13 reviews. Nick de Molina of XXL praised its production as "bold and experimental", and called Reloaded "a thrilling upgrade of signature East Coast delivery in the new age and one of the best albums of the year to date." Phillip Mlynar of Spin felt that "Marciano's writing style elevates [the album] to a great one" and stated, "he's written perhaps the most vivid rap album of the year — and possibly of his lifetime." Peter Marrack of Exclaim! called it "a sequel nonpareil in its originality and craftsmanship ... a humbling exhibit of spoken poetry knitted to orchestral magic, mixed and beautified by Q-Tip himself." Although he found it thematically "narrow", Pitchfork's Ian Cohen found Marciano's "lyrical genius ... so captivating on a second-by-second basis that these criticisms feel misplaced or even irrelevant", and stated, "Reloaded improves on Marcberg in every conceivable way."

About.com ranked the album #4 on its list of the "Top 10 Rap Albums of 2012." Spin ranked the album #6 on its list of the "40 Best Hip-Hop Albums of 2012."

== Track listing ==
Reloaded track listing
No.	Title	Producer	Length
1.	"Tek to a Mack"	Roc Marciano	4:41
2.	"Flash Gordon"	The Alchemist	2:51
3.	"Not Told" (featuring Knowledge the Pirate & Ka)	Roc Marciano	5:14
4.	"Pistolier"	The Alchemist	3:21
5.	"Thugs Prayer Pt. 2"	Roc Marciano	1:36
6.	"76"	Roc Marciano	4:33
7.	"We Ill"	Roc Marciano	3:23
8.	"Deeper"	Roc Marciano	2:57
9.	"Death Parade"	Roc Marciano	3:36
10.	"20 Guns"	Roc Marciano	1:54
11.	"Peru"	Roc Marciano	3:38
12.	"Thread Count"	Q-Tip	3:53
13.	"Nine Spray" (featuring Ka)	Ray West	4:04
14.	"Emeralds"	The Druids	3:53
15.	"The Man"	Roc Marciano	5:02
Total length:			54:36

Deluxe edition bonus tracks
No.	Title	Producer	Length
16.	"I Shot the King"	Roc Marciano	2:52
17.	"Sweet Nothings"	The Druids	3:26
18.	"Paradise for Pimps"	The Alchemist	3:12
Total length:			64:06

== Charts ==
Chart (2012)	Peak position
US Heatseekers Albums (Billboard)	13
US Top R&B/Hip-Hop Albums (Billboard)	44
