= The Elephant Man's Bones =

Studio album by Roc Marciano and the Alchemist
- Released: August 26, 2022
- Genre: Hip-hop
- Length: 37:58
- Label: Pimpire; ALC
- Producer: The Alchemist

Roc Marciano and the Alchemist chronology
| The Elephant Man's Bones (2022) | The Skeleton Key (2024) |

Roc Marciano chronology
| Blame Kansas (2022) | The Elephant Man's Bones (2022) | Nothing Bigger Than the Program (2023) |

The Alchemist chronology
| Continuance (2022) | The Elephant Man's Bones (2022) | One More (2022) |

Singles from The Elephant Man's Bones
- 1. "Deja Vu" Released: August 12, 2022

The Elephant Man's Bones is the first full-length collaborative studio album by American rappers and record producers Roc Marciano and the Alchemist. It was released on August 26, 2022, through Pimpire/ALC Records. Produced entirely by the Alchemist, it features guest appearances from Action Bronson, Boldy James, Ice-T and Knowledge the Pirate. The album was supported by its lead single, "Deja Vu", with an accompanying music video. A music video was also directed for the song "The Horns of Abraxas". The Elephant Man's Bones received universal acclaim from critics.

A website-exclusive edition of the album, subtitled Pimpire Edition, was released a week prior to its official release via Roc Marciano's website, featuring two bonus tracks entitled "Macaroni" and "Momma Love". Physical versions of this edition were also released on Marciano's website. Another deluxe edition of the album, subtitled ALC Edition, was released over a year later on September 1, 2023; featuring two brand new bonus tracks "DNA" and "Turkey Wingz". Physical versions of this edition were released exclusively on The Alchemist's ALC Records website, and unlike the Pimpire edition, was also available on streaming platforms.

The album marks the second joint project between the two artists, which was preceded by the 2011 EP Greneberg, together with Oh No.

== Critical reception ==
Professional ratings
Aggregate scores
| Source | Rating |
|---|---|
| Metacritic | 82/100 |
Review scores
| Source | Rating |
| AllMusic | 4/5 stars |
| HipHopDX | 4.5/5 |
| laut.de | 5/5 stars |
| Pitchfork | 8.2/10 |
| RapReviews | 9/10 |
| Spectrum Culture | 4/5 stars |
| Tom Hull | B+ |

The Elephant Man's Bones was met with universal acclaim from music critics. At Metacritic, which assigns a normalised rating out of 100 to reviews from mainstream publications, the album received an average score of 82, based on six reviews.

Anthony Malone of HipHopDX praised the album, saying "the realization of internet dream collaboration chatter, where the result is better than fantasy". Grant Jones of RapReviews wrote: "the chemistry is undeniable and The Elephant Man's Bones is the culmination of this partnership. This is an album that gets better with each listen and yet, despite capturing everything great about previous Roc Marciano albums, sounds remarkably fresh and current". Dylan Green of Pitchfork stated: "for the duo to finally meet in the middle for a full-length project after all these years—and for that project to be as warm, gutter, and satisfying as The Elephant Man's Bones—is remarkable". AllMusic's Paul Simpson resumed: "there's nothing sensationalist about the album's most brutal lyrics, and they're balanced out by the record's sly sense of humor and casually innovative production".

In a mixed review, Anthony Fantano for his YouTube channel The Needle Drop gave the album 6 out of 10, concluding: "after a strong start, The Elephant Man's Bones kind of trails off".

=== Accolades ===
Accolades for The Elephant Man's Bones
| Publication | Accolade | Rank | Ref. |
|---|---|---|---|
| BrooklynVegan | BrooklynVegan's Top 50 Albums of 2022 | 19 | |
| Complex | The Best Albums of 2022 | 11 | |
| Okayplayer | Okayplayer's 22 Best Albums of 2022 | 10 | |
| Passion of the Weiss | The POW Best Albums of 2022 | 2 | |
| Sound Opinions | The Best Albums of 2022 | 14 | |
| Stereogum | The 50 Best Albums of 2022 | 41 | |
| The Ringer | The 33 Best Albums of 2022 | 7 | |

== Track listing ==
All songs are produced by the Alchemist.

The Elephant Man's Bones track listing
| No. | Title | Writer(s) | Length |
|---|---|---|---|
| 1. | "Rubber Hand Grip" | Rakheim Calief Meyer; Alan Maman | 3:29 |
| 2. | "Daddy Kane" (featuring Action Bronson) | Meyer; Ariyan Arslani; Maman | 2:54 |
| 3. | "Deja Vu" | Meyer; Maman | 2:40 |
| 4. | "Quantum Leap" | Meyer; Maman | 2:28 |
| 5. | "The Elephant Man's Bones" | Meyer; Maman | 2:37 |
| 6. | "Bubble Bath" | Meyer; Maman | 2:36 |
| 7. | "Liquid Coke" | Meyer; Maman | 2:32 |
| 8. | "Trillion Cut" (featuring Boldy James) | Meyer; James Clay Jones III; Maman | 2:42 |
| 9. | "The Horns of Abraxas" (featuring Ice-T) | Meyer; Tracy Marrow; Maman | 2:46 |
| 10. | "JJ Flash" | Meyer; Maman | 2:48 |
| 11. | "Zig Zag Zig" | Meyer; Maman | 2:49 |
| 12. | "Stigmata" | Meyer; Maman | 2:16 |
| 13. | "Zip Guns" (featuring Knowledge The Pirate) | Meyer; Richard Iverson; Maman | 2:43 |
| 14. | "Think Big" | Meyer; Maman | 2:38 |
| Total length: | | | 37:58 |

Pimpire edition (bonus tracks)
| No. | Title | Writer(s) | Length |
|---|---|---|---|
| 15. | "Macaroni" | Meyer; Maman | 3:16 |
| 16. | "Momma Love" | Meyer; Maman | 3:50 |
| Total length: | | | 45:04 |

ALC edition (bonus tracks)
| No. | Title | Writer(s) | Length |
|---|---|---|---|
| 15. | "DNA" | Meyer; Maman | 2:39 |
| 16. | "Turkey Wingz" | Meyer; Maman | 2:31 |
| Total length: | | | 43:14 |

== Personnel ==
- Rahkeim Calief "Roc Marciano" Meyer – vocals
- Ariyan "Action Bronson" Arslani – vocals (tracks 2)
- James Clay "Boldy James" Jones III – vocals (track 8)
- Tracy Lauren "Ice-T" Marrow – vocals (track 9)
- Richard "Knowledge The Pirate" Iverson – vocals (track 13)
- Alan Daniel "The Alchemist" Maman – producer
- Eddie Sancho – mixing
- Joe LaPorta – mastering
- Darrell Krum – design, layout
- New High Filmz – photography
- Kitasavi – artwork
