= Marcielago =

Studio album by Roc Marciano
- Released: December 2, 2019
- Genre: East Coast hip-hop; gangsta rap
- Length: 49:58
- Label: Marci Enterprises
- Producer: The Alchemist; Animoss; Roc Marciano

Roc Marciano chronology
The Prequel (2019)	Marcielago (2019)	Reasonable Drought (2020)

Marcielago is the seventh studio album by American hip-hop artist Roc Marciano, released on December 2, 2019, via Marci Enterprises. Production was handled by Marciano, Animoss and The Alchemist. The album features guest appearances from rappers Ka, Knowledge the Pirate, Stove God Cooks, Westside Gunn and Willie the Kid.

== Background and release ==
Marciano announced the release date of Marcielago on November 26, 2019. The album was released on December 2, 2019, as a $30 exclusive digital download on Marciano's website, along with a music video for the track "Richard Gear".

== Critical reception ==
Professional ratings
Aggregate scores
Source	Rating
Metacritic	82/100
Review scores
Source	Rating
HipHopDX	4/5
Pitchfork	7.5/10
RapReviews	8/10
Underground Hip Hop Blog	4/5

Marcielago received critical acclaim from music critics. At Metacritic, which assigns a normalized score out of 100 to ratings from publications, the album received an average score of 82 based on four reviews, indicating "universal acclaim".

Grant Jones of RapReviews lauded the album, naming it "his best work since his return in 2017", and described it as "a statement of self-awareness that embraces the superhero role he has ended up personifying". Dana Scott of HipHopDX called the album "one of Roc’s most energetic yet", and commended the album's guest appearances. Writing for Pitchfork, Pete Tosiello considered the album "a capstone for Marci's decade, a mix of evocative soul samples and stripped-down loops paired with his trademark gnomic flow".

=== Year-end lists ===
Select year-end rankings of Marcielago
Publication	List	Rank	Ref.
Hip Hop Golden Age	The Best Hip Hop Albums of 2019	56	
Throw Up Magazine	Top 25: Best Hip Hop Albums of 2019	4	
Vinyl Me, Please	The Best Rap Albums of 2019	—N/a	

== Track listing ==
Marcielago track listing
No.	Title	Producer	Length
1.	"Select Few"	Roc Marciano	1:44
2.	"Molly Ringwald"	Animoss	2:14
3.	"Choosin Fees"	Marciano	2:54
4.	"Richard Gear"	Marciano	3:05
5.	"Ephesians" (featuring Ka)	Marciano	3:41
6.	"Tom Chambers" (featuring Knowledge the Pirate)	Marciano	5:34
7.	"I.G.W.T."	Marciano	4:03
8.	"Puff Daddy" (featuring Stove God Cooks)	Marciano	4:43
9.	"Boosie Fade" (featuring Westside Gunn)	Marciano	2:54
10.	"Bomb Shelter" (featuring Willie the Kid)	Marciano	6:15
11.	"Saw"	The Alchemist	4:11
12.	"Saylavi"	Animoss	3:04
13.	"God Loves You" (featuring Stove God Cooks)	Marciano	4:15
14.	"Joe Jackson"	Marciano	2:58
15.	"Legacy"	Marciano	1:14
Total length:			49:58

== Personnel ==
Credits adapted from album liner notes.

- Rahkeim Meyer – executive production, management
- Mike Kuz – mixing (tracks 2–6, 9, 11)
- 90 – mixing (tracks 1, 7, 8, 10, 12, 13–15)
- Boone McElroy – mastering
- Derek "Jazz" Walker – co-management
- Bernard Rollins – art, design
