= Ka (rapper) =

American rapper (1972–2024)

- Ka, c. 2010s

Background information
- Also known as: Brownsville Ka, Hermit, Dr. Yen Lo, K A
- Born: Kaseem Ryan; August 11, 1972; New York City, U.S.
- Origin: Brownsville, Brooklyn, New York City, U.S.
- Died: October 12, 2024 (aged 52)
- Genres: Underground hip-hop; East Coast hip-hop; conscious hip-hop
- Occupations: Rapper; lyricist; record producer
- Instrument: Vocals
- Years active: 1994–2024
- Labels: Iron Works; Obol for Charon; Pavlov Institute Records
- Formerly of: Natural Elements; Dr. Yen Lo; Hermit and the Recluse
- Spouse: Mimi Valdés
- Website: Brownsville Ka

Kaseem Ryan (August 11, 1972 – October 12, 2024), better known by his stage name Ka, was an American rapper, producer, and firefighter from Brooklyn, New York City. His solo work achieved critical acclaim, and he was often noted for his focused concept albums, skilled lyricism, and hushed vocal delivery.

== Early years ==
Kaseem Ryan was born on August 11, 1972, in New York City and grew up in the Brownsville neighborhood of Brooklyn. He initially developed an interest in hip-hop as a child in the late 1970s; in an interview with Vice, he estimated that he began rapping around the age of eight.

Listening to Slick Rick inspired Ryan to pursue rap as a career. He has noted in interviews that his Ryan stated that his earliest recorded song, named "Clown Ass Niggas", dates back to 1989 or 1990, which he worked on at a friend's studio. In 2012, Ryan described, in typically lyrical fashion, that the song "was horrible, but you couldn’t tell me that at the time. I played it over and over. I played it for my little sister and she was reciting the words, it was beautiful. I played it enough to the point of tricking myself into thinking that flow was aight, but it was horrible".

Ryan attended City College of New York in Manhattan with Mr. Voodoo of Natural Elements. After witnessing him casually rapping with some friends in a hallway, Voodoo invited him to come to his North Bronx studio and meet his producer Charlemagne. Ryan began regularly accompanying Voodoo to the studio, and built his discipline and songwriting skills through these sessions.

== Career ==
Ryan joined Natural Elements in 1994, performing as K A, though he felt that his skills were lacking compared to his groupmates and left soon afterward. In 1995 Ryan formed the duo Nightbreed with his friend Kev, which released a twelve-inch single titled "2 Roads Out the Ghetto" in 1998.

In 2008, Ka released his debut solo album, Iron Works. In an interview with Complex, he recounted that he no longer understood his musical production as a career choice, but simply as an aesthetic project for his family members to listen to. Iron Works caught the attention of Wu-Tang Clan member GZA, who invited Ka to appear on his 2008 album Pro Tools.

In 2012, Ka released the follow-up Grief Pedigree on his label Iron Works. Before the album, Ka released several music videos. The album was self-produced and featured a guest appearance by Roc Marciano.

Ka would release seven further solo albums and two further collaborative albums over the course of his career. In a 2016 interview with Rolling Stone, he described himself as writing from the perspective of "the man who's lived the life already, got out of it, now is trying to lead the honest life".

=== Firefighting career ===
Kaseem "Ka" Ryan served as a fire captain at the New York City Fire Department for twenty years. He was promoted to the position of fire captain at Engine Co. 235 in the Bedford-Stuyvesant neighborhood of Brooklyn in 2009. He was a first responder during the September 11 terrorist attacks on New York City.

Ryan has discussed his career as a fire captain: "I have a full time job and I work all the time. I try to keep that kinda low. I just have a job. It ain't my calling or nothing. It's just my job".

== Musical style ==
Ka's rapping was characterized by quiet, understated delivery and densely packed lyrics, traits which led Pitchfork to describe him as the "quiet sage of underground rap". He produced much of his own music, which was frequently drumless. Ka stated that he initially adopted his muted production style to avoid having the beats distract from his vocals.

Ka's albums are often concept albums focused on particular themes: Rolling Stone identified The Night's Gambit as based upon chess, Days with Dr. Yen Lo as inspired by The Manchurian Candidate, Honor Killed the Samurai as themed around samurai, and Orpheus vs. the Sirens as inspired by Greek mythology.

== Death ==
Ryan died on October 12, 2024, at the age of 52. The cause of death was not announced.

== Discography ==
=== Solo albums ===
List of studio albums, with selected details
Title	Album details
Iron Works	Released: 2008; Label: Iron Works; Format: CD, digital download
Grief Pedigree	Released: February 11, 2012; Label: Iron Works; Format: CD, LP, digital download
The Night's Gambit	Released: July 13, 2013; Label: Iron Works; Format: CD, LP, digital download
Honor Killed the Samurai	Released: August 13, 2016; Label: Iron Works; Format: CD, LP, digital download
Descendants of Cain	Released: May 1, 2020; Label: Iron Works; Format: CD, LP, digital download
A Martyr's Reward	Released: August 13, 2021; Label: Iron Works; Format: CD, LP, digital download
Languish Arts	Released: September 16, 2022; Label: Iron Works; Format: CD, LP, digital download
Woeful Studies	Released: September 16, 2022; Label: Iron Works; Format: CD, LP, digital download
The Thief Next to Jesus	Released: August 19, 2024; Label: Iron Works; Format: CD, LP, digital download

=== Collaborative albums ===
List of collaborative studio albums, with selected details
Title	Album details
Days with Dr. Yen Lo (with Preservation, as Dr. Yen Lo)	Released: May 16, 2015; Label: Iron Works; Format: CD, LP, digital download
Orpheus vs. the Sirens (with Animoss, as Hermit and the Recluse)	Release: August 18, 2018; Label: Obol for Charon; Format: CD, LP, digital download

=== EPs ===
List of EPs, with selected details
Title	Album details
1200 B.C. (with Preservation)	Released: June 2014; Label: Iron Works; Format: CD, 7" vinyl, digital download
The Superfly Single	Released: January 2016; Label: Iron Works; Format: CD, digital download

=== Guest appearances ===
Title	Year	Other performer(s)	Album
"Firehouse"	2008	GZA	Pro Tools
"Nine Spray"	2012	Roc Marciano	Reloaded
"Not Told"	2012	Roc Marciano, Knowledge the Pirate	Reloaded
"Squeeze"	2013	Roc Marciano, Guilty Simpson	Marci Beaucoup
"Confucius"	2013	Roc Marciano	Marci Beaucoup
"Delaney Card"	2016	Little Shalimar	Rubble Kings Soundtrack
"Marksmen"	2017	Roc Marciano	Rosebudd's Revenge
"Ephesians"	2019	Roc Marciano	Marcielago
"In Good Hands"	2020	Navy Blue	Àdá Irin
"A Cure for the Common"	2020	Preservation	Eastern Medicine, Western Illness
"Family Dollar"	2020	Chuck Strangers	Too Afraid to Dance
"Interlude"	2025	Che Noir	Seeds in Babylon
"Circa"	2026	Navy Blue	Sir Render
