= Behold a Dark Horse =

Studio album by Roc Marciano
- Released: September 18, 2018
- Genre: East Coast hip-hop; mafioso rap
- Length: 37:41
- Label: Marci Enterprises
- Producer: The Alchemist; Animoss; Doncee; Preservation; Q-Tip; Roc Marciano

Roc Marciano chronology
Warm Hennessy (2018)	Behold a Dark Horse (2018)	Kaos (2018)

Singles from Behold a Dark Horse
- 1. "The Horse's Mouth" Released: September 18, 2018

Behold a Dark Horse is the sixth studio album by American hip-hop artist Roc Marciano, released on September 18, 2018, by Marci Enterprises. The album is primarily produced by Marciano, with additional production from the Alchemist, Animoss, Doncee, Preservation, and Q-Tip. The album features guest appearances from rappers Black Thought, Knowledge the Pirate and Busta Rhymes.

== Background and release ==
Marciano surprise released Behold a Dark Horse exclusively on his website as a $30 digital download on September 18, 2018—a strategy he had employed for his previous two studio releases—with only a music video for the single "The Horse's Mouth" being made available for streaming.

The album's title is a reference to the book Behold a Pale Horse by American conspiracy theorist Milton William Cooper. The album cover was illustrated by Dom Dirtee.

To celebrate the streaming release of Behold a Dark Horse, Marciano appeared on an episode of music streaming service Tidal's web series Car Test.

== Critical reception ==
Professional ratings
Review scores
Source	Rating
HipHopDX	3.9/5
Pitchfork	7.1/10
RapReviews	6.5/10
Tiny Mix Tapes	5/5 stars
Underground Hip Hop Blog	8/10

Behold a Dark Horse received mostly positive reviews from music critics. In a five-star review, Samuel Diamond of Tiny Mix Tapes stated: "Seasoned to perfection, the album documents Roc Marciano cementing his legacy as an MC, producer, and influence in control of his ends—that is, not only of his money, but of his destiny." Sheldon Pearce of Pitchfork wrote: "Nearly 20 years into his career, with his lane more crowded than ever, Marci has made his raps sharper, let his flows whisk through richer samples, and deepened his commitment to the character he plays." In a lukewarm review, Steve "Flash" Juon of RapReviews claimed that the album "won’t disappoint long time Roc Marci fans, nor will it offer them anything new that they’ve never heard from Marci before".

=== Year-end lists ===
Select year-end rankings of Behold a Dark Horse
Publication	List	Rank	Ref.
Hip Hop Golden Age	The Best Hip Hop Albums of 2018	23	
Pitchfork	The Best Rap Albums of 2018	—N/a	
Rolling Stone	30 Best Hip-Hop Albums of 2018	29	

== Track listing ==
Behold a Dark Horse track listing
No.	Title	Producer	Length
1.	"The Horse's Mouth"	Preservation	1:55
2.	"Congo"	Roc Marciano	2:44
3.	"1000 Deaths"	Marciano	2:27
4.	"Diamond Cutters" (featuring Black Thought)	Marciano	3:51
5.	"Amethyst"	Animoss	2:50
6.	"Sampson & Delilah"	Don Cee	3:37
7.	"No Love" (featuring Knowledge the Pirate)	Marciano	2:59
8.	"Trojan Horse" (featuring Busta Rhymes)	Marciano	4:00
9.	"Fabio"	The Alchemist	4:44
10.	"Secrets"	Marciano	3:37
11.	"Whoolers"	Animoss	2:21
12.	"Consigliere"	Q-Tip	2:36
Total length:			37:41
