= Beneficence (rapper) =

American rapper

- Born: Rahim Muhammad
- Origin: Newark, NJ, U.S.
- Genres: Hip-hop
- Occupation: Rapper
- Years active: 1994-present
- Labels: Ozone Music; Undisputed; Ill Adrenaline Records

Rahim Muhammad, known by the stage name Beneficence, is an American rapper from Newark, New Jersey.

== Career ==
Beneficence has been active as an independent emcee since the early 1990s. His vinyl single "Sucka's Brevity" / "Hostile Life Style" was recorded in 1991 and released in 1994. The follow-up single "Thin Line" / "Low Profile Man" was released in 1998. His debut album, Eye of the Storm, was released in 2004. His sophomore album, Vocal Sport, was released in 2006 – it featured Mr. Len of Company Flow and El Da Sensei and DJ Kaos of The Artifacts, among others. His third album, Holders of the Key, was a collaboration with Swiss producer DJ LKB, and dropped in 2009.

2010 saw the release of the single "Heavyhitters" / "Royal Dynasty", following which Beneficence released two albums, Sidewalk Science (2011) and Concrete Soul (2012), on his own label, Ill Adrenaline Records, with guest appearances by Diamond D, Roc Marciano, Lord Tariq, and Masta Ace, among others.

In 2016, Beneficence released the album Basement Chemistry. The album received critical acclaim, including a rating of 4 out of 5 stars from Pop Magazine, which called it "a body of work that builds on the foundation of what hip-hop truly represents".

In 2021, Beneficence released “My Way”, a single featuring Phantasm of the Cella Dwellas and Masta Ace. The single was produced by Confidence, and was revealed to be from Stellar Mind, a collaboration album between the two. A second single, “Illest Mic Pros” (featuring Keith Murray), arrived within a few weeks of the first.

In April 2021, Beneficence announced the publication of Concrete Soul: The Memoir and Making of Ill Adrenaline Records, a memoir of his experiences in the music business.

== Accolades ==
Year	Organization	Accolade	Artist/work	Ranked	Source
2016	Pop Magazine	Best Albums of 2016	Basement Chemistry	18	
2021	Pop Magazine	Best Albums of 2021	Stellar Mind (with Confidence)	26	
2021	Pop Magazine	Best Songs of 2021	"My Way" (with Confidence featuring Masta Ace & Phantasm)	29	

== Discography ==
=== Albums ===
- 2004: Eye of the Storm (Ozone Music)
- 2006: Vocal Sport (Ozone Music)
- 2009: Holders of the Key (with DJ LKB) (Undisputed)
- 2011: Sidewalk Science (Ill Adrenaline Records)
- 2012: Concrete Soul (Ill Adrenaline Records)
- 2016: Basement Chemistry (Ill Adrenaline Records)
- 2021: Stellar Mind (with Confidence) (Ill Adrenaline Records)
