= Marcberg =

Studio album by Roc Marciano
- Released: May 4, 2010
- Recorded: 2009–2010
- Genre: Hip-hop
- Length: 58:34
- Label: Fat Beats Records
- Producer: Roc Marciano

Roc Marciano chronology
| Marcberg (2010) | Reloaded (2012) |

Marcberg is the debut album by American rapper Roc Marciano. The album was released on May 4, 2010 by Fat Beats Records. The album was entirely produced by Roc Marciano.

== Critical reception ==
Professional ratings
Review scores
| Source | Rating |
|---|---|
| AllMusic | 4.5/5 stars |
| HipHopDX | 4/5 stars |
| Pitchfork | 8.1/10 |
| PopMatters | 5/10 stars |
| RapReviews | 8.5/10 |

Upon its release, Marcberg received generally favorable reviews from music critics. Vincent Thomas of AllMusic gave the album four stars and a half out of five, saying "For those who wistfully long for that era of N.Y.C. hip-hop unadulterated by Auto-Tune and club synths and indie rock pandering, this is a beacon. It doesn't necessarily look forward, and it definitely doesn't look back. It's an unheralded auteur's contemporary vision; one whose future work will only add import." Sean Ryon of HipHopDX gave the album a four out of five, saying "In an industry full of copycats and kittens, Roc Marciano is poised to become the undisputed champ. Marcberg is a hard-hitting, unremorseful classic based on the same code of ethics that made the golden era so immaculate. Forget Little Mac; Roc Marciano is the one wearing the title belt."

Martin Douglas of Pitchfork gave the album an 8.1 out of ten, saying "If Marcberg sounds so claustrophobic and unconcerned about the rap scene surrounding it (one that has changed over at least four or five times since this record's closest counterparts have been recorded), it could be because Marciano has been too busy honing his craft to worry about swag rap." Grant Jones of RapReviews gave the album an eight and a half out of ten, saying "Many proclaim this to be a modern-day classic, but I would say 2012's Reloaded was the more complete album. Production was less erratic, the rhymes more refined and whilst it felt less like a traditional piece of rap music you could nod to, it was a stellar example of hip-hop sounding like art - which I hadn't heard the kind of in years. Nonetheless, Marcberg still remains a reminder of a bygone era and a refreshingly lyrical take on a stale genre." In a mixed review, PopMatters reviewer David Amidon gave the album a five out of ten, stating that "Marcberg is "a solid listen" but "it's not a gripping one, nor is it one of any particular consequence."

== Track listing ==
- All songs produced by Roc Marciano.

| No. | Title | Length |
|---|---|---|
| 1. | "Pimptro" | 1:32 |
| 2. | "It's a Crime" | 4:11 |
| 3. | "Whateva Whateva" | 3:56 |
| 4. | "Raw Deal" | 3:19 |
| 5. | "We Do It" | 4:36 |
| 6. | "Snow" | 4:03 |
| 7. | "Ridin Around" | 4:35 |
| 8. | "Panic" | 3:46 |
| 9. | "Thugs Prayer" | 2:59 |
| 10. | "Pop" | 3:40 |
| 11. | "Jungle Fever" | 5:00 |
| 12. | "Don Shit" | 3:38 |
| 13. | "Marcberg" | 4:33 |
| 14. | "Hide My Tears" | 4:32 |
| 15. | "Shoutro" | 4:11 |

Deluxe edition bonus tracks
| No. | Title | Length |
|---|---|---|
| 16. | "Scarface Nigga" | 3:46 |
| 17. | "Snow (Remix)" (featuring Sean Price) | 2:37 |

2012 Re-issue bonus tracks
| No. | Title | Length |
|---|---|---|
| 18. | "Bozak" | 3:54 |

15th Anniversary Edition bonus tracks
| No. | Title | Length |
|---|---|---|
| 19. | "Period Blood - Bonus Track" | 3:50 |
