= Marci Beaucoup =

Studio album by Roc Marciano
- Released: December 10, 2013
- Recorded: 2012–2013
- Genre: Hip-hop
- Length: 43:45
- Label: Man Bites Dog Records
- Producer: Roc Marciano

Roc Marciano chronology
The Pimpire Strikes Back (2013)	Marci Beaucoup (2013)	Rosebudd's Revenge (2017)

Marci Beaucoup is the third studio album by American hip-hop artist Roc Marciano, released on December 10, 2013 under Man Bites Dog Records. A month prior to its release, the album was preceded by The Pimpire Strikes Back, a mixtape which serves as its precursor.

Roc Marciano began working on the album in 2012 before the release of his second LP Reloaded. While the latter features contributions from Q-Tip and The Alchemist on the beats, Marci Beaucoup focuses on Marciano's own production with vocal performances from various artists while Marciano also performs on every song. Guest appearances includes Evidence, Guilty Simpson, Action Bronson, Freeway, Gangrene, Blu and Cormega, among others, along with frequent collaborators Ka and Knowledge the Pirate.

== Critical reception ==
Professional ratings
Aggregate scores
Source	Rating
Metacritic	77/100
Review scores
Source	Rating
Exclaim!	7/10
HipHopDX	4/5 stars
Pitchfork	6.8/10
RapReviews	7/10
Spin	8/10
XXL	4/5 (XL)

Upon its release, Marci Beaucoup received generally positive reviews from music critics. At Metacritic, assigns a normalized rating out of 100 to reviews from mainstream critics, the album received a 77 score based on 6 reviews, indicating "generally favorable reviews".

Phillip Mlynar of Spin gave the album an eight out of ten, saying "Instead of reaching that precipice and seeming to over-stretch for some sort of tipping point into the mainstream, [Roc Marciano]'s forged his own world, on his own terms, and invited like-minded artists to flourish there as well. Long may his principality prosper." HipHopDX reviewer Marcus J. Moore gave the album four exes out of five, saying "Marci Beaucoup is a nice victory lap that falls just short of Reloaded. There are standouts here—'Drug Lords', 'Psych Ward' and 'Soul Music' to name a few—but the overall product isn't as spectacular. Like its predecessor, Marci Beaucoup follows a standard formula of dope beats and dope rhymes, which works fine for an emcee of Marciano's caliber. With Beaucoup, Marciano and his friends just wanna rap and talk shit. That's fine. Marciano is a benevolent leader." David Inkeles of XXL gave the album an XL, saying "Marciano adroitly finesses Marci Beaucoup, with the sort of smug, witty, stream of conscious brilliance that is one of his more endearing attributes on the mic. Couple that with his own tremendous production, and the bevy of talented guest-spots on here, and Marci Beaucoup is the perfect gift for any hip-hop connoisseur."

Grant Jones of RapReviews gave the album a seven out of ten saying, "If you felt Roc's previous albums were too Roc-heavy, this is the ideal album to ease you in to his brand of excess rap. Yet for somebody that held his previous two albums in such high regard, it's a little bit disjointed, unpolished, and dare I say it, scruffy." Pitchfork reviewer Renato Pagnani gave the album a 6.8 out of ten, saying "As a proper third album, Marci Beaucoup doesn't stack up to its precursors, but as an advertisement for Marciano's services as a beatsmith, it's much more successful." Olivia Arezes of Exclaim! gave the album a seven out of ten, saying "Though not his most cohesive work, Marci Beaucoup is undoubtedly a solid addition to Roc Marciano's impressive and rapidly expanding catalogue."

== Track listing ==
- All tracks are produced by Roc Marciano.

Marci Beaucoup track listing
No.	Title	Length
1.	"Intro"	0:26
2.	"Love Means" (featuring Evidence)	3:14
3.	"Squeeze" (featuring Ka and Guilty Simpson)	3:17
4.	"456" (featuring Action Bronson)	2:21
5.	"Drug Lords" (featuring Knowledge the Pirate)	3:30
6.	"Dollar Bitch" (featuring Maffew Ragazino)	3:19
7.	"Didn't Know" (featuring Freeway and Knowledge the Pirate)	4:00
8.	"Soul Music" (featuring A.G.)	2:50
9.	"Trying to Come Up" (featuring Boldy James)	3:46
10.	"Psych Ward" (featuring Gangrene)	3:13
11.	"Confucius" (featuring Ka)	3:13
12.	"Willie Manchester" (featuring S.A.S.)	2:49
13.	"Cut the Check" (featuring Blu and Quelle Chris)	3:31
14.	"Safe" (Skit)	0:24
15.	"War Scars" (featuring Cormega and AG Da Coroner)	3:52
Total length:		43:45
