= Mt. Marci =

Studio album by Roc Marciano
- Released: November 16, 2020
- Genre: East Coast hip-hop; mafioso rap
- Length: 53:13
- Label: Marci Enterprises; Art That Kills
- Producer: Chuck Strangers; Jake One; Roc Marciano

Roc Marciano chronology
Reasonable Drought (2020)	Mt. Marci (2020)	Delgado (2021)

Mt. Marci is the eighth studio album by American rapper and producer Roc Marciano, released on November 16, 2020, via Marci Enterprises and Art That Kills. Production was primarily handled by Marciano himself, with additional production from Jake One and Chuck Strangers. The album features guest appearances from rappers Schoolboy Q, Action Bronson, Stove God Cooks, Kool Keith and Trenttruce.

== Background and release ==
Marciano revealed the title and tracklist of Mt. Marci on Instagram, on November 9, 2020. The album was first released on November 16, 2020 as a $40 exclusive digital download on Marciano's website. It was later released on streaming platforms on November 30, 2020.

On April 17, 2021, Marciano released the song "The General's Heart", which was formerly a bonus track exclusive to vinyl copies of Mt. Marci.

In June 2021, Marciano began a tour for the album, which included a performance at Sony Hall on July 22.

== Critical reception ==
Professional ratings
Review scores
Source	Rating
Beats Per Minute	75%
Hip Hop Golden Age	84/100
Pitchfork	7.7/10

Mt. Marci received positive reviews from critics. Writing for Pitchfork, Dylan Green described the album's sound as "bombastic yet refined", and praised Marciano's humorous but grim lyrics; he rated the album a 7.7/10. Joey Armone of Beats Per Minute highlighted Marciano's production, stating that "the atmospheres generated through his production provide a perfect backdrop for the strikingly cinematic lyrical portraits he creates". Hip Hop Golden Age editors rated it an 84/100, saying "LOTS of albums similar to Mt. Marci out this year, but NONE like Mt. Marci".

=== Year-end lists ===
Select year-end rankings of Mt. Marci
Publication	List	Rank	Ref.
BrooklynVegan	50 Best Rap Albums of 2020	28	
Complex	The Best Albums of 2020	32	
Hip Hop Golden Age	The Best Hip Hop Albums of 2020	17	
Mangoprism	The 10 Best Rap Albums of 2020	6	
Stereogum	The 10 Best Rap Albums of 2020	7	
Vulture	The Best Albums of 2020	10	

== Track listing ==
All tracks are produced by Roc Marciano, except for "Downtown '81" produced by Jake One, and "Baby Powder" co-produced by Chuck Strangers.

Mt. Marci track listing
No.	Title	Length
1.	"Intro - Allegories"	1:08
2.	"Downtown '81"	2:33
3.	"Covid Cough" (featuring Schoolboy Q)	3:49
4.	"Wheat 40's"	2:56
5.	"Spirit Cookin" (featuring Action Bronson)	2:53
6.	"Pimps Don't Wear Rabbits"	3:28
7.	"Butterfly Effect"	3:23
8.	"The Eye of Whorus" (featuring Stove God Cooks)	3:59
9.	"Steel Vagina"	3:00
10.	"Broadway Billy" (featuring Kool Keith)	3:46
11.	"Baby Powder"	4:23
12.	"Trenchcoat Wars"	3:23
13.	"Wicked Days" (featuring Trenttruce)	3:48
14.	"Garbage Pal Kids"	3:39
15.	"Crockett n Tubbs"	3:03
16.	"Mt. Marci"	4:02
Total length:		53:13

== Personnel ==
Credits adapted from album liner notes.

- Rahkeim Meyer – executive production
- Josué Thomas – art, design, executive production
- Todd Mushaw – mixing
- Boone McElroy – mastering
