= The Skeleton Key (album) =

Studio album by Roc Marciano and the Alchemist
- Released: December 9, 2024
- Genre: East Coast hip-hop; gangsta rap; drumless
- Length: 26:25
- Label: Pimpire; ALC
- Producer: The Alchemist

Roc Marciano and the Alchemist chronology
The Elephant Man's Bones (2022)	The Skeleton Key (2024)

Roc Marciano chronology
Marciology (2024)	The Skeleton Key (2024)	The Round Table (2025)

The Alchemist chronology
The Genuine Articulate (2024)	The Skeleton Key (2024)	Life Is Beautiful (2025)

Singles from The Skeleton Key
- 1. "Chopstick" Released: December 9, 2024

The Skeleton Key is the second collaborative studio album by American rappers and record producers Roc Marciano and the Alchemist, initially released on December 9, 2024. The album is produced entirely by the Alchemist, and features no guest appearances.

== Background and release ==
A listening party for The Skeleton Key, held in Miami on December 7, 2024, was announced on December 4, 2024, via Instagram.

The album was released on December 9, 2024, as a $40 exclusive digital download on Marciano's website, with two exclusive bonus tracks, "Hard Drugz" and "Bleu Mouson". The lead single, "Chopstick", and its accompanying music video were released on the same day. The album released on streaming platforms on December 13, 2024.

== Critical reception ==
Professional ratings
Review scores
Source	Rating
Pitchfork	8.0/10
RapReviews	7.5/10

Dash Lewis of Pitchfork described The Skeleton Key as "a weirder, bleaker, more hermetically sealed take on prestige street rap" compared to its predecessor The Elephant Man's Bones (2022). Sy Shackleford of RapReviews gave the album a 7.5 out of 10, stating that the album "holds its own, even with its sudden announcement and release", but thought that the album's short length "leaves more to be desired".

BrooklynVegan ranked the album number 11 on their "30 Best Rap Albums of 2024" year-end list (alongside Marciano's previous album Marciology).

== Track listing ==
All tracks are written by Rahkeim Meyer.

The Skeleton Key track listing
No.	Title	Length
1.	"Mystery God"	2:47
2.	"Street Magic"	3:42
3.	"Chopstick"	2:41
4.	"Knock It Off"	2:38
5.	"Acid"	1:47
6.	"Rauf"	2:17
7.	"Chateau Josué"	2:37
8.	"Skirt Steak"	2:15
9.	"Cryotherapy"	3:02
10.	"Make Sure"	2:39
Total length:		26:25

Digital download bonus tracks
No.	Title	Length
11.	"Hard Drugz"	1:54
12.	"Bleu Mouson"	1:59
Total length:		30:18

== Personnel ==
- Roc Marciano – vocals
- The Alchemist – production
- Joe LaPorta – mastering
- Eddie Sancho – mixing
- Chateau Josué – artwork
