= Scott Harding (musician) =

Canadian producer and musician

- Origin: Canada
- Occupations: Producer and Musician

Scott Harding, sometimes credited as Scotty Hard, is a Canadian producer and musician who is based in New York City and who has worked in underground hip-hop and jazz.

He came to prominence as a producer for the WordSound label, which released his debut album Return of Kill Dog E in 1999. In addition to working in hip-hop, he has worked with funk-oriented jazz performers like Sex Mob, DJ Logic and Medeski, Martin and Wood. His second solo album, Scotty Hard's Radical Reconstructive Surgery (2006), was an outright jazz album released by Thirsty Ear and featuring Harding producing and remixing "an amazing all-star group".

In February 2008, Harding was seriously injured in a car accident in Brooklyn. He suffered spinal damage and now uses a wheelchair, but he continues to work in music.
