= Roc Marciano =

American rapper (born 1978)

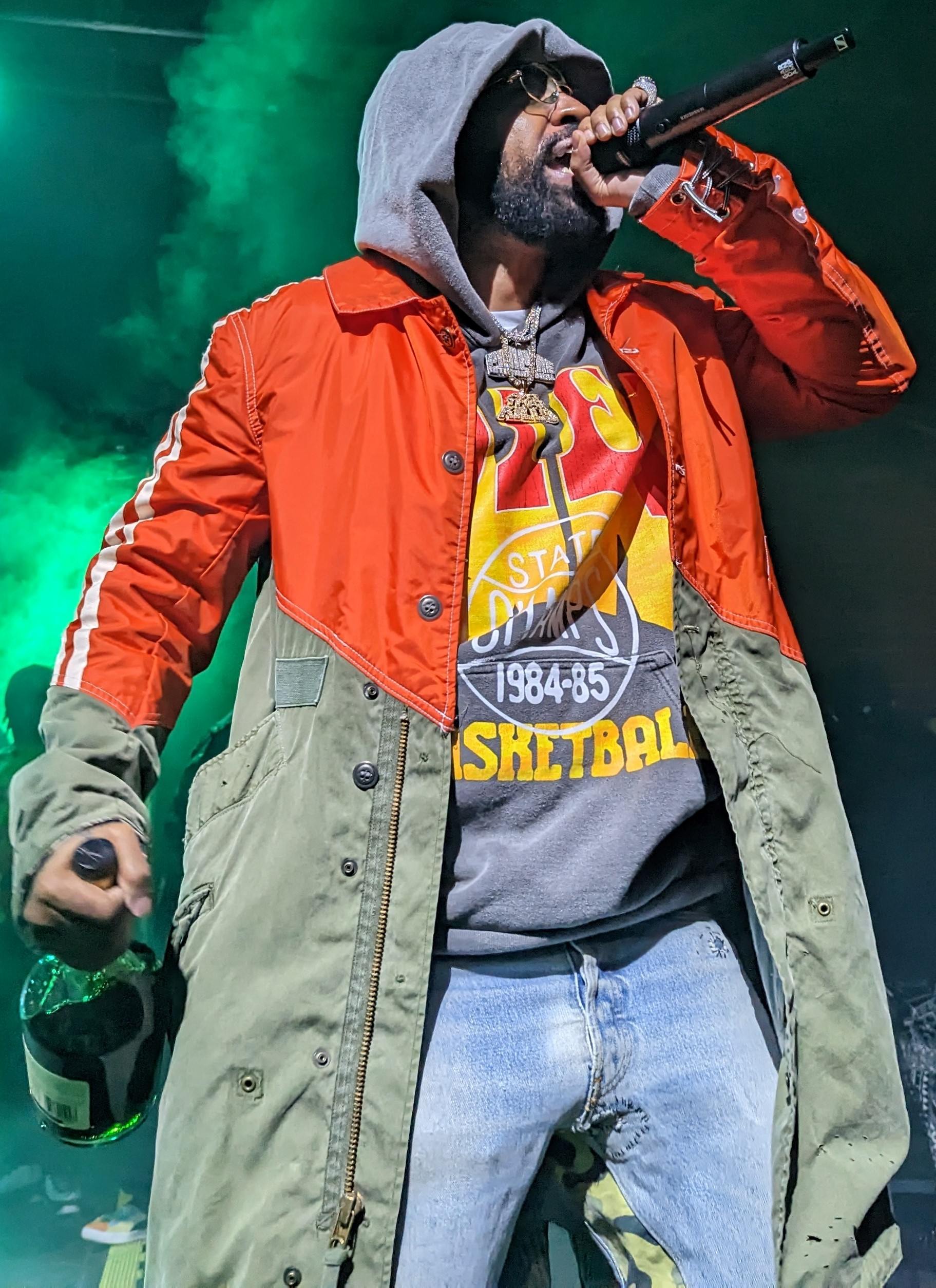
- Marciano in December 2022

Background information
- Born: Rahkeim Calief Meyer; February 11, 1978 (age 48); Hempstead, New York, U.S.
- Genres: East Coast hip-hop; alternative hip-hop
- Occupations: Rapper; songwriter; producer
- Works: Roc Marciano discography
- Years active: 1999–present
- Labels: Fat Beats; Decon; Man Bites Dog; Pimpire; Marci Enterprises; Art That Kills
- Member of: Flipmode Squad
- Website: https://rocmarci.com/

Rahkeim Calief Meyer (born February 11, 1978), better known by his stage name Roc Marciano, is an American rapper and record producer. He is known for his intricate internal rhymes and wordplay detailing mafioso and pimp themes over sample based production. He has been called the "Godfather of the Underground" for pioneering the resurgence of gritty, lyrical rap and use of drumless sample loops in the early 2010s with his highly influential debut album Marcberg (2010).

Marciano has gone on to release 13 studio albums and a variety of mixtapes and EPs, most of which are almost entirely produced by Marciano himself with the notable exceptions of the DJ Muggs-produced Kaos (2018), the Alchemist-produced The Elephant Man's Bones (2022) as well as The Skeleton Key (2024), and the DJ Premier-produced The Coldest Profession (2025). He frequently collaborates with Muggs and Alchemist, in addition to other underground artists such as Knowledge the Pirate, Ka, Action Bronson, Animoss, and various members of the Griselda collective, while also producing for other artists.

== Career ==
Roc Marciano started his career in 1999 when he joined the Flipmode Squad and made his first appearances on “Whatcha Come Around Here For” and “The Heist". Marciano left to form the U.N., a hardcore underground hip-hop group consisting of three other MCs (Dino Brave, Laku & deceased member Mic Raw) with whom he released an album on Carson Daly's 456 Entertainment in 2004. Roc Marciano appeared on the 2005 Wu-Tang Clan compilation album, Wu-Tang Meets the Indie Culture, and in Pete Rock's 2008 album, NY's Finest, drawing acclaim for such performances. In 2008, Marciano began focusing on his solo career. In May 2010, he released his self-produced debut album, Marcberg, to critical acclaim.

In 2011, Marciano collaborated with Gangrene to release the collaborative EP Greneberg. Marciano also collaborated with Kendrick Lamar and Consequence on the song "Up Against the Wall" which is featured on Consequence's mixtape, Movies on Demand 2.

Marciano's second solo album, Reloaded, was released on November 15, 2012 which Allmusic described as "grim and exultant at once, this is low-profile hustling on wax at its finest."

In late 2013, Marciano released a free mixtape, The Pimpire Strikes Back. The mixtape served as preface to his third studio album, Marci Beaucoup, which was self-produced and featured artists such as Action Bronson, Evidence, Ka, and Quelle Chris.

On February 21, 2017, Roc Marciano released his fourth studio album, Rosebudd's Revenge. The album featured frequent collaborators, Ka and Knowledge the Pirate, and production from The Arch Druids, Mushroom Jesus, Modus Op, Knxwledge, and Roc Marciano himself.

On February 27, 2018, Marciano released his fifth studio album, RR2: The Bitter Dose. The album featured guest appearances by Knowledge the Pirate and Action Bronson, and production from Animoss, Don Cee, and Roc Marciano himself. On September 18, 2018, Marciano released his sixth studio album, Behold a Dark Horse, which was received positively by critics. On October 15, 2018, Marciano released Kaos, a collaboration album with producer DJ Muggs, to positive reviews.

In 2019, Marciano released his seventh studio album, Marcielago, which he followed up with Mt. Marci in 2020 and Marciology in 2024.

== Artistry ==
Roc Marciano has named Rakim, Grand Daddy I.U., Kool Keith, MF Doom, Large Professor, EPMD, and Public Enemy as musical influences.

His production process relies heavily on vintage equipment, notably the Akai MPC60, SP-1200, and MPC2500. In a 2012 interview with The Fader, Marciano explained that he began with an MPC60 alongside a turntable and mixer, favoring its crisp, punchy sound over the SP-1200, which he found limiting due to its short sampling time and need for extensive chopping, before upgrading to the MPC-2500 for its greater memory and versatility, allowing him to refine his signature looping technique. This hands-on approach results in a cinematic soundscape, often compared to a “black-and-white crime thriller,” evoking the gritty, pre-gentrified New York of his youth.

== Discography ==
Studio albums

- Marcberg (2010)
- Reloaded (2012)
- Marci Beaucoup (2013)
- Rosebudd's Revenge (2017)
- RR2: The Bitter Dose (2018)
- Behold a Dark Horse (2018)
- Marcielago (2019)
- Mt. Marci (2020)
- Marciology (2024)
- 656 (2026)

Collaborative albums

- Kaos (2018) (with DJ Muggs)
- The Elephant Man's Bones (2022) (with The Alchemist)
- The Skeleton Key (2024) (with The Alchemist)
