= Real Bad Boldy =

Studio album by Boldy James and Real Bad Man
- Released: December 11, 2020
- Genre: Hip-hop
- Length: 29:52
- Label: Real Bad Man
- Producer: Real Bad Man

Boldy James and Real Bad Man chronology
Real Bad Boldy (2020)	Killing Nothing (2022)

Boldy James chronology
The Versace Tape (2020)	Real Bad Boldy (2020)	Bo Jackson (2021)

Real Bad Man chronology
On High Alert Volume 3 (2020)	Real Bad Boldy (2020)	On High Alert Volume 4 (2022)

Singles from Real Bad Boldy
- 1. "Thousand Pills" Released: November 19, 2020

Real Bad Boldy is a collaborative studio album by American rapper Boldy James and American record producer Real Bad Man. It features guest appearances from Meyhem Lauren, Stove God Cooks, Eto, Mooch, and Rigz. It was released on December 11, 2020, through Real Bad Man Records.

== Background ==
James Clay Jones III, better known as Boldy James, is an American rapper based in Detroit. Real Bad Man is an American streetwear line and record label helmed by Adam Weissman, who is based in Los Angeles.

Real Bad Boldy is produced and arranged by Real Bad Man. It features guest appearances from Meyhem Lauren, Stove God Cooks, Eto, Mooch, and Rigz.

It is Boldy James' fourth album of 2020, following The Price of Tea in China with the Alchemist, Manger on McNichols with Sterling Toles, and The Versace Tape with Jay Versace. He stated, "With Real Bad Boldy, I'm talking about my life before music; before I caught this second wave that I got right now." It is his first collaborative album with Real Bad Man, followed by Killing Nothing (2022), Conversational Pieces (2025), and Strobelight (2026).

== Release ==
"Thousand Pills" was released as a single from the album, on November 19, 2020. The album was released on December 11, 2020, through Real Bad Man Records. A music video was released for "Light Bill".

== Critical reception ==
Professional ratings
Review scores
Source	Rating
Beats Per Minute	76%
Consequence	B+
Pitchfork	7.6/10
Spectrum Culture	70%

Andrew Sacher of BrooklynVegan described Real Bad Boldy as "a very solid album and more proof that anything Boldy touches right now is worth hearing." Colin Dempsey of Spectrum Culture wrote, "On his fourth release of 2020, Boldy James solidifies his rank as the most consistent rapper of the year through a cadence both understated and blunt." Tim Sentz of Beats Per Minute commented that "Real Bad Boldy is easily his most accessible work to date, as it veers towards standard structures; he's using verse-chorus-verse-chorus on multiple entries." Pete Tosiello of Pitchfork stated, "Paradoxically, it's James' most Detroit-sounding record in years, with expressive samples recalling Dilla and Waajeed's sooty electro-soul." He added, "Short of Manger's audacious vision and Tea in China's tricky corners, Real Bad Boldy is both an entry point and a crowd-pleaser that suggests an American original: No one sounds quite as comfortable in this milieu."

=== Accolades ===
Accolades for Real Bad Boldy
Publication	List	Rank	Ref.
BrooklynVegan	6 Best Rap Albums of December 2020	—	

== Track listing ==
Real Bad Boldy track listing
No.	Title	Length
1.	"Real Bad Boldy"	1:41
2.	"Light Bill" (featuring Meyhem Lauren)	3:21
3.	"Thousand Pills" (featuring Stove God Cooks)	2:49
4.	"Failed Attempt"	3:06
5.	"Little Vicious" (featuring Eto)	3:02
6.	"On Ten"	3:05
7.	"Held Me Down"	3:28
8.	"Street Shit"	2:58
9.	"Good Foot" (featuring Mooch and Rigz)	3:18
10.	"Champion"	3:04
Total length:		29:52

== Personnel ==
Credits adapted from liner notes.

- Boldy James – vocals
- Real Bad Man – production, arrangement, mixing (1, 2, 4, 5, 7, 8)
- Meyhem Lauren – vocals (2)
- Stove God Cooks – vocals (3)
- Eto – vocals (5)
- Mooch – vocals (9)
- Rigz – vocals (9)
- Vincente Espi – mixing (2, 4, 5, 7, 8)
- Eddie Sancho – mixing (3, 6, 9, 10)
- John Sparkz – mastering
