= Killing Nothing =

Studio album by Boldy James and Real Bad Man
- Released: May 20, 2022
- Genre: Hip-hop
- Length: 42:51
- Label: Real Bad Man
- Producer: Real Bad Man

Boldy James and Real Bad Man chronology
Real Bad Boldy (2020)	Killing Nothing (2022)	Conversational Pieces (2025)

Boldy James chronology
Super Tecmo Bo (2021)	Killing Nothing (2022)	Fair Exchange No Robbery (2022)

Real Bad Man chronology
Mood Swings (2022)	Killing Nothing (2022)	Real Bad Flights (2022)

Killing Nothing is a collaborative studio album by American rapper Boldy James and American record producer Real Bad Man. It features guest appearances from Crimeapple, Knowledge the Pirate, Rome Streetz, and Stove God Cooks. It was released on May 20, 2022, through Real Bad Man Records.

== Background ==
James Clay Jones III, better known as Boldy James, is an American rapper based in Detroit. Real Bad Man is an American streetwear line and record label helmed by Adam Weissman, who is based in Los Angeles. They previously released a collaborative album, Real Bad Boldy (2020), with the former on vocals and the latter on production.

Killing Nothing is their second collaborative album. It is Boldy James' first studio album since Super Tecmo Bo (2021). The album consists of 13 tracks. It features guest appearances from Crimeapple, Knowledge the Pirate, Rome Streetz, and Stove God Cooks.

== Release ==
The album was released on May 20, 2022, through Real Bad Man Records. Music videos were released for "5 Mississippi" and "Sig Sauer".

== Critical reception ==
Professional ratings
Review scores
Source	Rating
HipHopDX	3.9/5
Pitchfork	7.3/10
Sputnikmusic	4.0/5

Andrew Sacher of BrooklynVegan stated, "Like on Real Bad Boldy, RBM's production gives classic boom bap a hypnotic update, which is the perfect backdrop for Boldy's cold, hardened storytelling." Riley Wallace of HipHopDX wrote, "Much like their previous collaboration, the generally low-tempo MC sounds especially menacing over dark, full-bodied soundscapes." He added, "While not wildly inventive, his new release brims with realness, continuing to position Boldy in the top tier of street rap." Preezy Brown of Vibe called the album "a full-bodied offering that further validates James' distinction of being one of the premier talents in the genre." Mehan Jayasuriya of Pitchfork wrote, "As usual, James doesn't waste an inch of the canvas, packing each song with tightly-constructed bars." He added, "Given the pace at which he's been working these last few years, it's remarkable how focused Killing Nothing feels: there's no fat to speak of across the record's 43 minutes."

=== Accolades ===
Accolades for Killing Nothing
Publication	List	Rank	Ref.
BrooklynVegan	8 Best Rap Albums of May 2022	—	
Vibe	The 25 Best Hip-Hop Albums of 2022	6	

== Track listing ==
Killing Nothing track listing
No.	Title	Length
1.	"Water Under the Bridge"	3:31
2.	"All the Way Out"	2:49
3.	"Game Time"	3:15
4.	"A Hundred Ninety Bands"	3:33
5.	"Meddlin'" (featuring Crimeapple)	2:51
6.	"Cash Transactions" (featuring Knowledge the Pirate)	3:33
7.	"Open Door" (featuring Rome Streetz and Stove God Cooks)	3:26
8.	"Ain't No Bon Jovi"	2:55
9.	"Bo Jack (Miller Light)"	2:55
10.	"Sig Sauer"	3:36
11.	"5 Mississippi"	3:01
12.	"Seeing Visions"	3:31
13.	"Killing Nothing"	3:55
Total length:		42:51

== Personnel ==
Credits adapted from liner notes.

- Boldy James – vocals
- Real Bad Man – production
- Henry Solomon – horn (1, 9)
- Crimeapple – vocals (5)
- Knowledge the Pirate – vocals (6)
- Rome Streetz – vocals (7)
- Stove God Cooks – vocals (7)
- J O'Neal – chorus vocals (9)
- Anthony Cava – guitar (10)
- Vincente Espi – mixing (1–6, 8–13)
- Eddie Sancho – mixing (7)
- Pablo San Martin – mastering
