= Bo Jackson (album) =

Studio album by Boldy James & the Alchemist
- Released: August 13, 2021
- Genre: Hip-hop
- Length: 44:03
- Label: ALC
- Producer: The Alchemist

Boldy James & the Alchemist chronology
The Price of Tea in China (2020)	Bo Jackson (2021)	Super Tecmo Bo (2021)

Boldy James chronology
Real Bad Boldy (2020)	Bo Jackson (2021)	Super Tecmo Bo (2021)

The Alchemist chronology
This Thing of Ours (2021)	Bo Jackson (2021)	This Thing of Ours 2 (2021)

Bo Jackson is the third collaborative studio album by American rapper Boldy James and American record producer the Alchemist. It was released on August 13, 2021, through ALC Records. It features guest appearances from Benny the Butcher, Earl Sweatshirt, Roc Marciano, Stove God Cooks, Currensy, and Freddie Gibbs. It peaked at number 94 on the UK Album Downloads Chart.

== Background ==
Bo Jackson is the fourth collaborative project by Boldy James and the Alchemist, preceded by My 1st Chemistry Set (2013), the Boldface EP (2019), and The Price of Tea in China (2020). The album takes its title from Bo Jackson. The album's cover art was hand-made by the Alchemist.

== Critical reception ==
Professional ratings
Review scores
Source	Rating
Beats Per Minute	84%
HipHopDX	4.1/5
Pitchfork	8.0/10

Chase McMullen of Beats Per Minute stated, "As grave as it is grand, Bo Jackson is an album that feels deceptively immediate." He added, "The Alchemist has opened the doors wide on this one, inviting us in without restraint, right into the awaiting jaws of Boldy James' slickly sinister, bubbling vision." Dylan Green of Pitchfork commented that the album "continues to match James' descriptive paranoia against Alchemist's ever-expanding palette." Tom Breihan of Stereogum wrote, "while thousands of rappers have rhapsodized about their own criminal histories, vanishingly few have done it with the atmospheric grace and clinical detail that Boldy brings to Bo Jackson." He added, "the thing that sticks is the connection between Alchemist and Boldy — the way Alc can find the right frequency to bring out Boldy's impeccable craftsmanship and send him into a deep memory zone."

=== Accolades ===
Year-end lists for Bo Jackson
Publication	List	Rank	Ref.
Complex	The Best Albums of 2021	44	
Consequence	Top 50 Albums of 2021	18	
The Fader	The 50 Best Albums of 2021	29	
Paste	The 50 Best Albums of 2021	34	
Rolling Stone	The 50 Best Albums of 2021	45	
Stereogum	The 50 Best Albums of 2021	31	

== Track listing ==
Bo Jackson track listing
No.	Title	Length
1.	"Double Hockey Sticks"	3:25
2.	"Turpentine"	3:23
3.	"Brickmile to Montana" (featuring Benny the Butcher)	2:40
4.	"E.P.M.D"	3:38
5.	"Steel Wool"	3:22
6.	"Photographic Memories" (featuring Earl Sweatshirt and Roc Marciano)	3:53
7.	"Speed Trap"	2:06
8.	"Diamond Dallas" (featuring Stove God Cooks)	3:26
9.	"Flight Risk"	2:06
10.	"Illegal Search & Seizure"	2:37
11.	"Fake Flowers" (featuring Currensy and Freddie Gibbs)	3:46
12.	"3rd Person"	3:31
13.	"First 48 Freestyle"	3:15
14.	"Drug Zone"	2:55
Total length:		44:03

== Personnel ==
Credits adapted from liner notes.

- Boldy James – vocals
- The Alchemist – production, front cover collage
- Benny the Butcher – vocals (3)
- Earl Sweatshirt – vocals (6)
- Roc Marciano – vocals (6)
- Stove God Cooks – vocals (8)
- Curtis Chambers – additional guitar (8)
- Currensy – vocals (11)
- Freddie Gibbs – vocals (11)
- Eddie Sancho – mixing
- Joe LaPorta – mastering
- Mr. Krum – design, layout
- Mvsa Photography – photography

== Charts ==
Chart performance for Bo Jackson
Chart (2021)	Peak position
UK Album Downloads (Official Charts)	94
