= Bo Jackson =

American football and baseball player (born 1962)

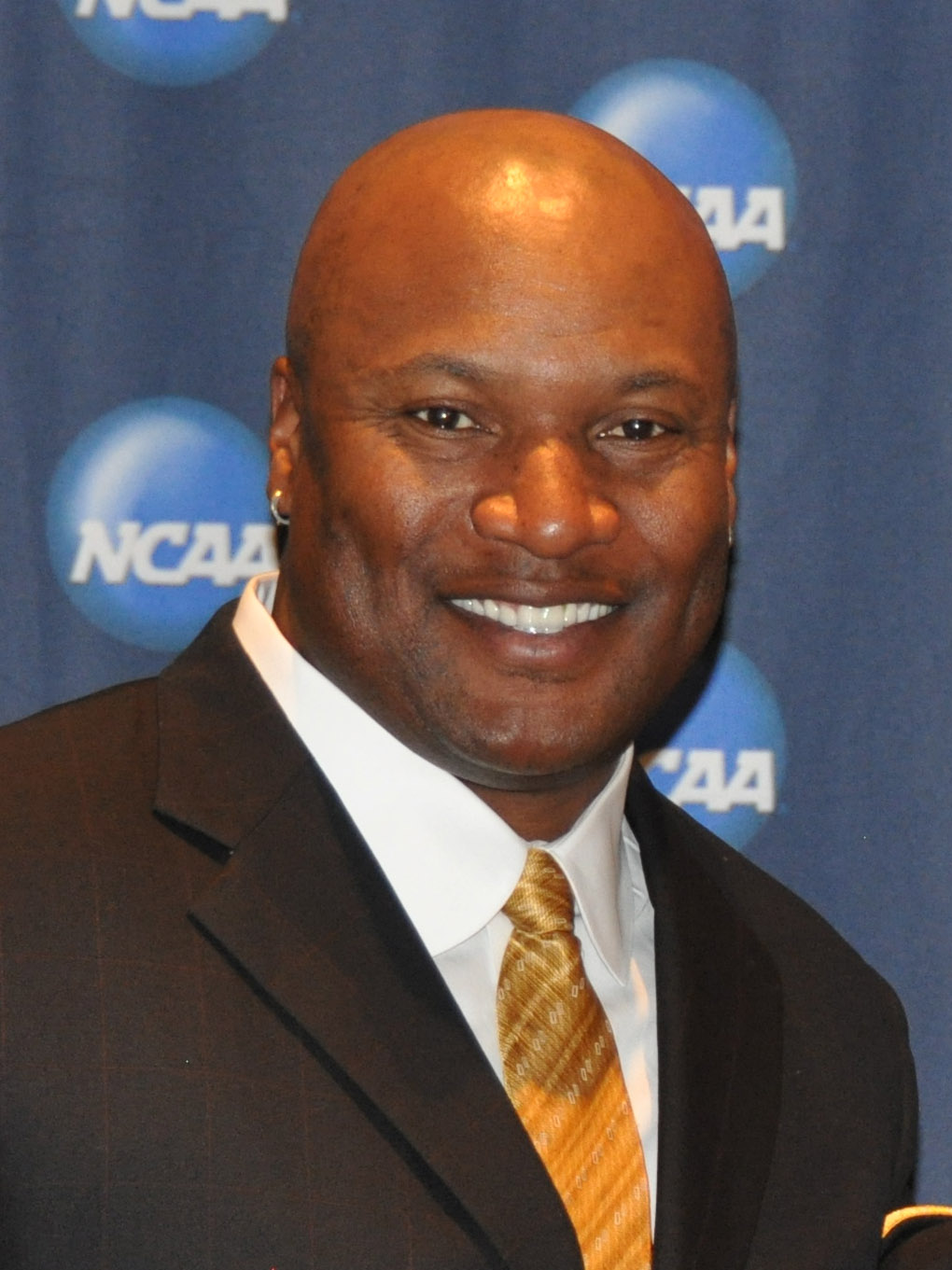
- Jackson in 2011
- Born: November 30, 1962 (age 63); Bessemer, Alabama, U.S.
- Football career

No. 34
- Position: Running back

Personal information
- Listed height: 6 ft 1 in (1.85 m)
- Listed weight: 230 lb (104 kg)

Career information
- High school: McAdory (McCalla, Alabama)
- College: Auburn (1982–1985)
- NFL draft: 1986: 1st round, 1st overall pick

Career history
- Los Angeles Raiders (1987–1990)

Awards and highlights
- Pro Bowl (1990); Bert Bell Memorial Trophy (1987); UPI All-Rookie Team (1987); Heisman Trophy (1985); Unanimous All-American (1985); Consensus All-American (1983); SEC Male Athlete of the Year (1986); SEC Player of the Year (1985); UPI SEC Offensive Player of the Year (1983); 3× First-team All-SEC (1982, 1983, 1985); Auburn Tigers No. 34 retired; Walter Camp All-Time All-American; NFL record: Most career rushes of 90+ yards: 2 (Note: Tied with Derrick Henry, Ahman Green, Chris Johnson, and Lamar Miller.)

Career NFL statistics
- Rushing yards: 2,782
- Rushing average: 5.4
- Rushing touchdowns: 16
- Receptions: 40
- Receiving yards: 352
- Receiving touchdowns: 2
- Stats at Pro Football Reference
- College Football Hall of Fame
- Baseball career
- Outfielder / Designated hitter
- Batted: Right Threw: Right

MLB debut
- September 2, 1986, for the Kansas City Royals

Last MLB appearance
- August 10, 1994, for the California Angels

MLB statistics
- Batting average: .250
- Hits: 598
- Home runs: 141
- Runs batted in: 415
- Stolen bases: 82
- Stats at Baseball Reference

Teams
- Kansas City Royals (1986–1990); Chicago White Sox (1991, 1993); California Angels (1994)

Career highlights and awards
- All-Star (1989); AL Comeback Player of the Year (1993); Hit four home runs in consecutive at-bats (1990); Kansas City Royals Hall of Fame

Vincent Edward "Bo" Jackson (born November 30, 1962) is an American former professional baseball and football player. He is the only professional athlete in history to have been named an All-Star in two major American sports. Jackson's achievements at the elite levels of multiple sports have given him a reputation as one of the greatest athletes of all time.

Jackson played college baseball as an outfielder and college football as a running back for the Auburn Tigers, and won the Heisman Trophy in 1985. He played in the National Football League (NFL) for the Los Angeles Raiders and in Major League Baseball (MLB) for the Kansas City Royals, Chicago White Sox, and California Angels. He was inducted into the College Football Hall of Fame in 1996 and the Kansas City Royals Hall of Fame in 2024.

In 1989 and 1990, Jackson's name became known beyond just sports through the "Bo Knows" advertising campaign, a series of advertisements by Nike, starring Jackson alongside musician Bo Diddley, promoting a cross-training athletic shoe named for Jackson.

A 1991 hip injury ended his football career and caused him to miss the entire 1992 MLB season; he returned to win The Sporting News AL Comeback Player of the Year Award in 1993, and retired after the strike-shortened 1994 season. Jackson expanded into other pursuits, including the completion of his Bachelor of Science degree in Family and Child Development at Auburn. Jackson still holds the NFL record for most runs of 90+ yards from scrimmage with two. In addition, Jackson appeared in small roles as an actor in television shows such as The Fresh Prince of Bel-Air and Married... with Children, as well as films such as The Chamber. He has been featured on the cover of Sports Illustrated 13 times.

== Early life ==
Jackson, the eighth of ten children, was born on November 30, 1962, and raised in Bessemer, Alabama. He did not meet his father until age 10. His family referred to him as a "wild boar hog," as he would constantly get into trouble. This was later shortened to "Bo", the name he has gone by ever since.

Jackson attended McAdory High School in McCalla, where he served as the team's running back and rushed for 1,175 yards on 118 carries with 17 touchdowns as a senior. He also excelled in baseball, breaking the national high school record for home runs by hitting 20 in 25 games during his senior season.

In track and field, Jackson was a two-time state champion in the decathlon. Both times that he was the decathlon state champion, he built up such a commanding points lead before the 1500 meters that he never competed in that event. "Distance is the only thing I hate about track," he said. Jackson set state high school records for indoor high jump (6 ft 9 in (2.06 m)), which stood for 37 years, and triple jump (48 ft 7.25 in (14.81 m)). (Note: Some reliable sources claim his record to be 48 ft 8 in (14.83 m).)

== College career ==
In June 1982, Jackson was selected by the New York Yankees in the second round (50th overall) of the 1982 Major League Baseball draft and was offered a $250,000 contract, but he instead chose to attend Auburn University on a football scholarship because he promised his mother he would be the first in the family to go to a major college. He was recruited by head coach Pat Dye and then Auburn assistant coach Bobby Wallace alongside defensive head coach Dominic Sauer. At Auburn, he proved to be a tremendous athlete in both baseball and football. He shared the backfield with quarterback Randy Campbell, Lionel "Little Train" James and Tommie Agee.

=== College football ===
During his time playing for the Auburn Tigers football team, he ran for 4,303 career yards, which was the fourth-best performance in Southeastern Conference (SEC) history and still stands as the school record. Jackson finished his career with an average of 6.6 yards per carry, which set the SEC record (minimum 400 rushes).

In 1982, Jackson's freshman year, Auburn played Boston College in the Tangerine Bowl, where Jackson made a one-handed grab on an option pitch. Auburn went on to win the game 33–26 as Jackson rushed 14 times for 64 yards and two touchdowns.

In 1983, as a sophomore, Jackson rushed for 1,213 yards on 158 carries, for an average of 7.7 yards per carry, which was the second-best single-season average in SEC history (minimum 100 rushes). In the 1983 Auburn-Alabama game, Jackson rushed for 256 yards on 20 rushes (12.8 yards per carry), which at the time was the sixth-most rushing yards gained in a game in SEC history and the second best yard-per-rush average in a game (minimum 20 attempts) in SEC history. Auburn finished the season by winning the Sugar Bowl against Michigan, where Jackson was named Most Valuable Player. In 1984, Jackson's junior year (most of which Jackson missed due to injury), he earned Most Valuable Player honors at the Liberty Bowl after defeating Arkansas.

In 1985, Jackson rushed for 1,786 yards, which was the second-best single-season performance in SEC history. For his performance in 1985, Jackson was awarded the Heisman Trophy in what was considered the closest margin of victory ever in the history of the award, winning over University of Iowa quarterback Chuck Long. In 1986, he received the Golden Plate Award of the American Academy of Achievement presented by Awards Council member and Heisman Trophy winner Herschel Walker.

Jackson finished his career at Auburn with 4,575 all-purpose yards and 45 total touchdowns, 43 rushing and two receiving, with a 6.6 yards per carry average. Jackson's football number 34 was officially retired at Auburn in a halftime ceremony on October 31, 1992. His is one of only four numbers retired at Auburn. The others are 1971 Heisman Trophy winner Pat Sullivan's number 7, and the number 88 of Sullivan's teammate and favorite receiver, Terry Beasley and 2010 Heisman winner and National Champion quarterback Cam Newton's number 2 in 2024. In 2007, Jackson was ranked #8 on ESPN's Top 25 Players In College Football History list. In 2025, Auburn honored Jackson at the Iron Bowl to commemorate the 40th anniversary of his Heisman Trophy-winning season.

==== "Bo Over the Top" ====
On November 27, 1982, Jackson and the Tigers found themselves embattled with their heated in-state rival, Alabama (7–3), in the Iron Bowl in Birmingham, Alabama. Auburn held a 14–13 halftime lead when Alabama running back Paul Ott Carruth scored on an eight-yard touchdown run—and then the Crimson Tide added a field goal to make it a 22–14 Alabama lead going into the fourth quarter. Auburn responded as Al Del Greco made a 23-yard field goal to make it a 22–17 score in the fourth quarter. From Auburn's own 34-yard line, Jackson and company began a long drive as he converted on a 4th-and-1 at the Alabama 42. Jackson, who ran 17 times for 114 yards during this Iron Bowl, continued marching his team downfield as he caught an 8-yard pass from quarterback Randy Campbell down to the Alabama one-yard line. During the huddle, Jackson convinced Coach Dye to let him go over the top of offensive and defensive lines because he was a seven-foot high jumper in high school and the other team wouldn't be expecting it. On fourth down with 2:26 left in the game, Jackson completed the drive by going over the top for a one-yard touchdown run as Auburn (which finished 9–3 in 1982) pulled off a 23–22 victory over Alabama and coach Paul "Bear" Bryant.

=== College baseball ===
Jackson missed much of his senior season after being ruled ineligible by the NCAA following a visit with the Tampa Bay Buccaneers, whom he believes tried to sabotage his baseball career.

In an April 1985 report, a major league scout stated that Jackson's only weakness was a lack of baseball experience. The scout said that he could be one of the all-time greats barring any injuries. He had a minor shoulder injury in the beginning of his collegiate football career, which didn't cause him issues in the long term. The scout also noted that this was his first year playing baseball and he seemed to be a "do-it-all type of player" and also stated he was "the best pure athlete in America today". At the time, Jackson was 22 years old, and trying to make an even bigger name for himself than he already had in his football career.

=== College track and field ===
While at McAdory High School, Jackson competed as a sprinter, hurdler, jumper, thrower and decathlete. His best 100-meter time in high school was 10.44 seconds, but he later ran a 10.39 at Auburn. He also ran the 100-yard dash in 9.59 seconds (Note: Some reliable sources claim his record to be 9.54 seconds.) and the 60-yard dash in 6.18 seconds. As a hurdler, he recorded times of 7.29 seconds in the 55m hurdles and 13.81 seconds in the 110m hurdles. In decathlon, he reached 8,340 points. In the jumping events, he had personal-best jumps of 2.06 m (6 ft 9 in) in the high jump, 7.52 m (24 ft 8 in) in the long jump and 14.85 m (48 ft 9 in) in the triple jump. As a thrower, he got top-throws of 15.27 m (50 ft 1 in) in the shot put and 45.44 m (149 ft 1 in) in the discus throw.

Jackson qualified for the NCAA nationals in the 100-meter dash in his freshman and sophomore years. He considered a career in track and field, but sprinting would not gain him the financial security of MLB or the NFL, nor would he have sufficient time to train, given his other commitments. When asked if he ran a 4.12 40-yard dash at the 1986 NFL Scouting Combine, the fastest time ever recorded in NFL Combine history and a time that has been rumored from several sources, Jackson claimed some of the coaches hand-timed him at 3.9 and 4.0, but that he actually ran a 4.13 electronic-timed 40-yard dash at a pro day at Auburn University. He also stated he did not attend the 1986 Scouting Combine: "I did not go because I was already picked to be the first person to go in the draft," Jackson said. "If you're going to be the first person to go in the draft, why should you go to a combine and do all of that?"

Personal bests

Event	Time (sec.)	Venue	Date
100 meters	10.39	4134	111

== Professional sports career ==
=== Baseball ===
==== Kansas City Royals ====
Jackson was selected with the first overall pick of the 1986 NFL draft by the Tampa Bay Buccaneers. He refused to play for them after a visit to team facilities using a private jet caused him to be ineligible to finish out his final college baseball season. The Buccaneers said the use of the jet was NCAA-approved, which was not the case. Jackson believes that the failure to obtain NCAA approval was deliberate and was intended by the Buccaneers to get him to play football instead of baseball. He vowed not to sign with Tampa Bay should they draft him, which they did anyway. He kept his vow and opted to play baseball for the Kansas City Royals, the defending World Series champions, who drafted him in the fourth round (105th overall), in the 1986 Major League Baseball draft. Shortly after the draft, Jackson signed a three-year contract with the Royals worth just over $1 million. He spent 53 games with the Memphis Chicks, the Royals' Class AA minor league affiliate, and was called up to the majors in September 1986. Jackson made his major league debut on September 2 against the Chicago White Sox, and finished the game 1-for-3. He made the Royals' roster in 1987 as a left fielder, and batted .235 with 22 home runs, 53 RBI and 10 stolen bases in 116 games; his 22 home runs set a Royals rookie record.

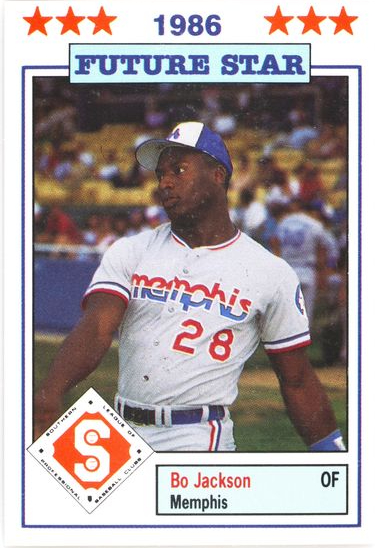
A 1986 baseball card of Jackson with the Memphis Chicks

On July 29, 1988, playing against the Baltimore Orioles, Jackson, batting against Jeff Ballard, attempted to call time out as Ballard was delivering the ball. The time-out wasn't granted, but Jackson recovered to swing and hit the pitch over the left-field wall for a home run despite taking one hand off the bat at the beginning of the at bat. He finished the 1988 season batting.246 with 25 home runs, 68 RBI and a career-high 27 stolen bases in 124 games, becoming the first Royals player to record a 25–25 season.

Jackson began to show his true potential in 1989, and was voted to start for the American League All-Star team and named the MVP for his play on both offense and defense. In the top of the first inning, he caught Pedro Guerrero's two-out line drive to left-center field to save two runs. Then he led off the bottom of the first—his first All-Star plate appearance—with a monstrous 448-foot (137 m) home run against Rick Reuschel of the San Francisco Giants. NBC-TV announcer Vin Scully exclaimed, "Look at that one! Bo Jackson says hello!" Wade Boggs followed with his own home run, making them the first pair in All-Star history to lead off the first inning with back-to-back home runs. In the second inning, he beat the throw on a potential double play to drive in the eventual winning run. He then stole second base, making him the second player in All-Star Game history to hit a home run and steal a base in the same game (the first was Willie Mays). Jackson finished the game 2-for-4 with one run scored and two RBI.

In 1989, Jackson batted .256 with 32 home runs and 105 RBI in 135 games. His 172 strikeouts tied him for 10th most strikeouts in a season for a right-handed batter since 1893. On July 11, 1990, against the Orioles, Jackson performed his famous "wall run", when he caught a ball six strides away from the wall. As he caught the ball at full tilt, Jackson looked up and ran three steps along the wall, to avoid impact and the risk of injury from the fence.

Before Royals games, Jackson used to shoot at a target with a bow and arrow in the Royals clubhouse.

During the 1990 season, Jackson hit HRs in four consecutive at-bats, tying a Major League record (held by several). His fourth came off Randy Johnson, after hitting his first three before a stint on the disabled list. Unwilling to pay his $2.375 million salary in 1991 to rehabilitate his football injury, the Royals released Jackson on March 18, 1991.

On March 13, 2024, the Royals announced that Jackson had been elected to the Royals Hall of Fame and would be inducted before the team's June 29 game against Cleveland.

==== Chicago White Sox and California Angels ====
Only 16 days after Jackson was released by the Royals, the Chicago White Sox offered him a three-year deal, guaranteeing $700,000 per season with a performance-based upside of $8.15 million over the term. White Sox co-owner Jerry Reinsdorf stated they did not anticipate him to play all seasons while he addressed his hip issues and avascular necrosis. Jackson played two seasons appearing in 23 games in 1991 and 85 games in 1993.

He appeared on White Sox' disabled roster during the 1992 season due to completing hip replacement surgery earlier that year. He became the first athlete in professional sports history to compete with an artificial hip. While with the White Sox, Jackson promised his mother that once he returned from his hip replacement surgery in 1993, he would hit a home run for her. Before he could return, his mother died. In his first at-bat after surgery, he hit a home run to right field. Jackson recovered the ball by trading an autographed bat for it, and stated he planned to have it bronzed and placed on her dresser.

Later that season, a three-run home run by Jackson clinched the AL West title and the first playoff berth for the White Sox in a decade. He was named The Sporting News AL Comeback Player of the Year. In the only post-season appearance of his career, Jackson went hitless in 10 at-bats, but drew three walks and scored a run as the White Sox lost to the Toronto Blue Jays in six games in the American League Championship Series.

On January 31, 1994, Jackson signed a one-year, $1 million contract with the California Angels. He played in 75 games, batting .279 with 13 home runs and 43 RBI before the season was cut short by the 1994–95 baseball strike. After the season, Jackson decided to retire at age 32. "I got to know my family," he said, "That looks better to me than any $10 million contract."

In his eight baseball seasons, Jackson had a career batting average of .250, hit 141 home runs and had 415 RBI, with a slugging percentage of .474. His best year was 1989, with his effort earning him All-Star status. In 1989, Jackson ranked fourth in the American League in both home runs, with 32, and RBI, with 105.

=== Football ===
During his junior and senior years at Auburn, Jackson transitioned his focus to baseball and became increasingly vocal about his unwillingness to play in the NFL.

A month before the 1986 NFL draft, Tampa Bay Buccaneers owner and Alabama alum Hugh Culverhouse took him on a private jet to visit with the team and get a physical during his senior baseball season. Jackson was told by the Buccaneers that the trip had been cleared by the NCAA and SEC. In truth, it had not, and because the SEC barred athletes from being professional in one sport and amateur in another, he was declared ineligible near the tail end of his senior baseball season. Years later, Jackson told ESPN that he has long believed the Buccaneers sabotaged his collegiate baseball career "because of the season I was having". He was so angry at the Buccaneers' actions that he vowed never to play a down for them, going as far as to tell Culverhouse, "You draft me if you want. You're going to waste a draft pick. I can promise you that."

Jackson's collegiate baseball coach, Hal Baird, told the Tampa Bay Times that no one from either camp mentioned the trip to him, and feared the worst when Jackson told him that the trip had been paid for. Baird maintained that had he known about the trip, he would have told Jackson about the SEC rule that barred him from playing professional football while being an amateur in baseball. Along similar lines, Dye told the Times that once Jackson concluded that the Tampa Bay trip was "a tactical move", it ended any chance of him ever playing for the Buccaneers.

Despite this, the Buccaneers selected Jackson with the first overall pick in the 1986 draft. Jackson turned down the Buccaneers' $7.6 million, five-year contract in favor of a $1.07 million, three-year contract with the Kansas City Royals, and the Buccaneers forfeited his rights before the 1987 draft. Choosing to sleep in rather than attend the 1987 NFL draft, Jackson found out that he was selected in the seventh round (183rd overall) by the Los Angeles Raiders. Initially, Jackson stated he would continue to focus on baseball and would not sign, but his interest was piqued when he learned Raiders owner Al Davis was a fan of Jackson and receptive to Jackson playing both baseball and football. A five-year, $7.4 million contract was negotiated where Jackson would be permitted to play the entire baseball season with the Royals and would report to the Raiders once the MLB season was finished even if it meant missing NFL games. In addition to this, Davis gave Jackson the highest salary of any non-quarterback player in NFL history, and Jackson would receive a reported $500,000 signing bonus plus another $500,000 if he returned the following year in 1988.

Jackson joined the Raiders in time for their Week 8 matchup against the New England Patriots, where he rushed for a total of 37 yards on eight carries. Jackson shared the backfield with Marcus Allen, himself an All-Pro and former Heisman Trophy winner, but eventually supplanted him as the featured running back despite being listed as the team's fullback. Perhaps his most notable performance in his rookie season came on Monday Night Football against the Seattle Seahawks in Week 12. Prior to the game Seahawks linebacker Brian Bosworth insulted Jackson and promised in a media event before the game to contain Jackson. Jackson responded by running over Bosworth on his way to a touchdown near the goal line. He also made a 91-yard run in the second quarter, to the outside, untouched down the sideline. Jackson rushed for 221 yards that night and two touchdowns. He added a third with a reception. The 221 yards was a single-game record for the Raiders at the time.

In his rookie season, Jackson rushed for a total of 554 yards on only 81 carries for a 6.8 yards per carry average. He played in seven games, starting five, and scored a total of six touchdowns (four rushing, two receiving). The next year, Jackson played in ten of the Raiders' sixteen games with nine starts, recording a total of 580 yards and three touchdowns.

Jackson's 1989 season was his best in the league. In eleven games, with nine starts, Jackson rushed for a total of 950 yards with a 5.5 yards per carry average and four touchdowns. In his abbreviated 1990 campaign, Jackson rushed for 698 yards and was selected to the only Pro Bowl of his career.

Jackson sustained an NFL career-ending hip injury from a seemingly routine tackle at the end of a 34-yard run in a playoff game on January 13, 1991, against the Bengals.

In his four seasons in the NFL, Jackson rushed for 2,782 yards and 16 touchdowns with an average yards per carry of 5.4. He also caught 40 passes for 352 yards and two touchdowns. Jackson's 221 yards on November 30, 1987, just 29 days after his first NFL carry, is still a Monday Night Football record.

=== Hip injury ===
Jackson's athletic career was affected by an injury to his left hip. In his last football game, a playoff victory over the Cincinnati Bengals in January 1991, Jackson suffered a dislocated hip following a tackle. In the film You Don't Know Bo, Jackson claimed that when he realized his injury on the field, he popped his hip back into the socket, which damaged the blood vessels supplying blood to the hip. While doctors did not find proof that Jackson reset his hip, they did discover that there was a fracture of one of Jackson's hip bones, as well as traumatic chondrolysis (the loss of the thin layer of cartilage that lines the ball-and-socket hip joint) and avascular necrosis (death of bone tissue) of the femoral head. He was forced to retire from football, and was then cut by the Royals in spring training. Jackson returned to competition with the White Sox toward the end of the 1991 baseball season but did not play the 1992 season while having his hip replaced.

== Career statistics ==
=== Baseball ===
==== MLB ====
Year	Team	G	Standard batting													
Year	Team	G	AB	R	H	2B	3B	HR	RBI	SB	CS	BB	SO	BA	OBP	SLG
1986	KC	25	82	9	17	2	1	2	9	3	1	7	34	.207	.286	.329
1987	KC	116	396	46	93	17	2	22	53	10	4	30	158	.235	.296	.455
1988	KC	124	439	63	108	16	4	25	68	27	6	25	146	.246	.287	.472
1989	KC	135	515	86	132	15	6	32	105	26	9	39	172	.256	.310	.495
1990	KC	111	405	74	110	16	1	28	78	15	9	44	128	.272	.342	.523
1991	CHW	23	71	8	16	4	0	3	14	0	1	12	25	.225	.333	.408
1992	CHW	—	—	—	—	—	—	—	—	—	—	—	—	—	—	—
1993	CHW	85	284	32	66	9	0	16	45	0	2	23	106	.232	.289	.433
1994	CAL	75	201	23	56	7	0	13	43	1	0	20	72	.279	.344	.507
TOTALS		694	2,393	341	598	86	14	141	415	82	32	200	841	.250	.309	.474

==== College ====
Year	Team	G	AB	R	H	2B	3B	HR	RBI	SB	CS	BB	SO	BA	OBP	SLG	OPS
1983	Auburn	26	68	14	19	4	0	4	13	5	2	14	34	.279	.443	.515	.958
1984	Auburn	Did not play due to injury															
1985	Auburn	42	147	55	59	5	6	17	43	9	1	26	41	.401	.500	.864	1.364
1986	Auburn	22	69	21	18	3	2	7	14	5	0	20	30	.261	.424	.652	1.076
Totals		90	284	90	96	12	8	28	70	19	3	66	105	.338	.466	.729	1.195

=== Football ===
==== NFL ====
Year	Team	GP	Rushing					Receiving				
Year	Team	GP	Att	Yds	Avg	Lng	TD	Rec	Yds	Avg	Lng	TD
1987	RAI	7	81	554	6.8	91T	4	16	136	8.5	23	2
1988	RAI	10	136	580	4.3	25	3	9	79	8.8	27	0
1989	RAI	11	173	950	5.5	92T	4	9	69	7.7	20	0
1990	RAI	10	125	698	5.6	88	5	6	68	11.3	18	0
Career		38	515	2,782	5.4	92	16	40	352	9.1	27	2

==== College ====
Year	Team	Rushing					Receiving			
Year	Team	Att	Yds	Avg	Lng	TD	No.	Yds	Avg	TD
1982	Auburn	127	829	6.5	53	9	5	64	12.8	0
1983	Auburn	158	1,213	7.7	80	12	13	73	5.6	2
1984	Auburn	87	475	5.5	53	5	4	62	15.5	0
1985	Auburn	278	1,786	6.4	76	17	4	73	18.3	0
Totals		650	4,303	6.6	80	43	26	272	10.5	2

== Career highlights ==
=== Halls of fame ===
- Senior Bowl Hall of Fame – Class of 1995
- Alabama Sports Hall of Fame – Class of 1996
- College Football Hall of Fame – Class of 1998
- Missouri Sports Hall of Fame – Class of 2005
- Chicagoland Sports Hall of Fame – Class of 2012
- California Sports Hall of Fame – Class of 2014
- Southern League Hall of Fame – Inaugural Class of 2014
- Alabama Academy of Honor – Class of 2015
- Baseball Reliquary Shrine of the Eternals – Class of 2016
- Sugar Bowl Hall of Fame – Class of 2017
- Kansas City Royals Hall of Fame – Class of 2024
- Cotton Bowl Hall of Fame – Class of 2025

=== Football ===
==== NFL ====
- 2× UPI second-team All-AFC (1989, 1990)
- Pro Bowl (1990)
- Bert Bell Memorial Trophy (1987)
- UPI All-Rookie Team (1987)
- AFC Offensive Player of the Week (1987 - Week 12)
- Sports Illustrated's Raiders All-Time Top 5 Halfbacks (#4)
- Most career rushes of 90+ yards: 2
  - Most career rushing touchdowns of 90+ yards: 2

==== College ====
- National Champion (1983) – The New York Times, Billingsley Report, College Football Researchers Association, and ARGH; Co-National Champion by Rothman and Sagarin
- SEC Champion (1983)
- Japan Bowl Champion (1986)
  - Japan Bowl MVP
- Cotton Bowl MVP (1985)
- Liberty Bowl Champion (1984)
  - Liberty Bowl MVP
- Sugar Bowl Champion (1983)
  - Sugar Bowl MVP
- Tangerine Bowl Champion (1982)
- Heisman Trophy (1985)
- Walter Camp Award (1985)
- Chic Harley Award (1985)
- SN Player of the Year (1985)
- UPI Player of the Year (1985)
- Unanimous All-American (1985)
- Consensus All-American (1983)
- Football News Freshman All-American (1982)
- 2nd most NCAA rushing yards (1985)
- Tied-2nd (Note: Tied with Steve Gage and Lorenzo White.) most NCAA rushing touchdowns (1985)
- Tied-3rd (Note: Tied with Carlos Reveiz, Steve Gage, Lorenzo White, and Thurman Thomas.) in NCAA scoring (1985)
- SEC Male Athlete of the Year (1986)
- SEC Player of the Year (1985)
- UPI SEC Offensive Player of the Year (1983)
- 3× First-team All-SEC (1982, 1983, 1985)
- 2× SEC rushing yards leader (1983, 1985)
- SEC rushing touchdowns leader (1985)
- SEC scoring leader (1985)
- SEC Football Legends (2006)
- Most 200+ rushing yards games in a season in SEC history: 4 (Note: Tied with Herschel Walker and Derrick Henry.) (1985)
- 5th most career rushing yards in SEC history: 4,303
- 8th most career rushing yards per attempt in SEC history: 6.6
- 10th most career rushing touchdowns in SEC history: 43
- Most career rushing yards in Auburn history
- 2nd most career rushing touchdowns in Auburn history (Note: Behind Cadillac Williams.)
- Auburn Tigers No. 34 retired
- Walter Camp All-Time All-American
- Walter Camp All-Century Team
- FWAA Third Team 75th Anniversary All-America Team
- Senior Bowl 50th Anniversary All-Time Team
- ESPN Second Team All-Time All-American
- CBS Sports Second Team All-Time All-American
- Bleacher Report First Team All-Time SEC
- ESPN's 3rd Greatest College Football Player of All-Time
- Walter Camp Alumni of the Year (1999)
- Doak Walker Legends Award (2014)

=== Baseball ===
==== MLB ====
- 10th in the 1989 AL MVP race
- MLB All-Star (1989)
- MLB All-Star Game MVP (1989)
- Tony Conigliaro Award (1993)
- The Sporting News AL Comeback Player of the Year (1993)
- Beacon of Life Award (2013)
- Baseball America – Kansas City Royals No. 1 Prospect (1987)
- Hit a MLB record four home runs in consecutive at-bats (1990)
- Kansas City Royals rookie record 22 home runs (1987–1994)
- First Kansas City Royals player to hit 25 home runs and steal 25 bases in a season (1988)
- Second player in MLB history to hit a home run and steal a base in the same All-Star Game (1989) (Note: After Willie Mays.)
- 30-Home run season (1989)
- 4× 20-Home run seasons (1987–1990)
- 2× 25-Stolen base seasons (1988, 1989)
- 2× 25–25 club (1988, 1989)
- 100 RBI season (1989)

==== College ====
- American Baseball Coaches Association All-South Region Team (1985)
- American Baseball Coaches Association All-District Team (1985)
- Tied-Most (Note: Tied with Joey Cora and Gator Thiesen.) triples in the SEC: 6 (1985)
- .401 Batting average season (1985)

=== Other ===
- Tanqueray World Amateur Athlete of the Year Award (1985)
- American Sport Art Museum and Archives – Jim Thorpe All-Around Award (1988)
- Jim Thorpe Pro Sports Awards – Jim Thorpe Legacy Award (1992)
- Easter Seals – "Power to Overcome Adversity Award" (1992)
- Auburn University – International Quality of Life Award (1998)
- ESPN Sport Science Greatest Athlete of All Time (2013)

=== High school ===
==== Football ====
- Birmingham Touchdown Club Back of the Year for Jefferson County (1982)
- First-team All-State (1982)
- All-State Honorable Mention (1981)
- All-Southern Honorable Mention (1982)
- AHSAA All-Star Team (1982)
- AL.com reader poll – Alabama's All-Time Best High School Running Back

==== Baseball ====
- Class 3A County Championship (1982)
- All-State Team (1982)
- National home run leader (1982)
- Set the National record for most home runs in a season: 20 (1982)
- Pitched two no-hitters (1982)

==== Track and field ====
- 3A State Champion (1980)
- All-State Team (1982)
- 2× Decathlon State Champion (1981, 1982)
- 3× 120-yard high hurdles State Champion (1980–1982)
- 100-yard dash State Champion (1982)
- 2× Long jump State Champion (1981, 1982)
- Triple jump State Champion (1981)
- 330-yard intermediate hurdles State Champion (1981)
- High jump State Indoor Champion (1982)
- 2× Long jump State Indoor Champion (1980, 1982)
- 60-yard dash State Indoor Champion (1982)
- 60-yard high hurdles State Indoor Champion (1982)
- Mile relay State Indoor Champion (1980)

State records set

- 100-yard dash – 9.59 seconds (1982)
- High jump (indoor) – 6 feet, 9 inches (1982)
- 2× Long jump (indoor) – 22 feet, 6.5 inches (1982) (Note: He recorded a high school personal best of 23 feet, 1 inch outdoors that same year, though it was not a state record.)
  - 21 feet, 8.5 inches (1980)
- Triple jump – 48 feet, 7.25 inches (1981)
- 60-yard high hurdles (indoor) – 7.29 seconds (1982)

== Popularity ==
=== "Bo Knows" ===
Jackson became a popular figure for his athleticism in multiple sports through the late 1980s and early 1990s. He endorsed Nike and was involved in a popular ad campaign called "Bo Knows" which envisioned Jackson attempting to take up a litany of other sports, including tennis, golf, luge, auto racing, ice hockey, and playing blues music with Bo Diddley, who scolded Jackson by telling him, "You don't know Diddley!" This "Bo Knows" marketing campaign was for the release of the Nike Air Trainer I, or Air Trainer SC, a cross-training shoe, the first of its kind.

=== Homage ===
The CHIKARA professional wrestling tag team the Throwbacks (baseball player Dasher Hatfield and football player Mark "Mr. Touchdown" Angelosetti) had a finishing move called "Bo Jackson".

In 1992, the American hip-hop group A Tribe Called Quest referenced Jackson in their song "Scenario."

In 1995, Jamaican dancehall artist Ini Kamoze referenced Jackson in his biggest single, "Here Comes the Hotstepper."

In 1997, Foxy Brown referenced Jackson in her song "Big Bad Mamma."

Radio personality James Golden adopted the stage name "Bo Snerdley" in homage to Jackson. ("Snerdley" was a last name that Golden's employer, Rush Limbaugh, frequently used as a placeholder name.)

Detroit rapper Boldy James named his 2021 album with The Alchemist after Jackson, as well as using his likeness for his 2021 album Super Tecmo Bo.

=== Video games ===
Called "the greatest athlete in video game history", Jackson's digital counterpart was nicknamed by fans "Tecmo Bo" since being featured in the 1991 video game Tecmo Super Bowl for the Nintendo Entertainment System, where he is all but untacklable. Players would make the popular move of running Bo all the way back to his own one-yard line, then run 99 yards for a touchdown with defenders literally bouncing off him. Referencing his video game character, Jackson was featured in a 2016 advertisement for the Kia Sorento, with Jackson driving the car into a virtual stadium (a second ad features Brian Bosworth with Jackson referencing the infamous Monday Night Football touchdown run).

Jackson has his own video game for the original Game Boy portable gaming system, Bo Jackson's Hit and Run. The game featured both baseball and football. Released around the same time was Bo Jackson Baseball for the NES system and IBM-compatible computers. Jackson can be unlocked as a player in ESPN NFL Football. Jackson made an appearance in the 2004 video game NFL Street 2. Jackson also made his first appearance in the modern Madden series, Madden 15 and Madden 16. He later returned in Madden NFL 20 as part of the Madden Ultimate Team 10th Anniversary promo, before getting a community-made Golden Ticket card.

=== Television ===
Jackson was a character in ProStars, an NBC Saturday morning cartoon show which also features Wayne Gretzky and Michael Jordan fighting crime and helping children; though he made physical cameos in the live-action segments of several episodes, his cartoon counterpart was voiced by actor Dave Fennoy. Jackson likewise appeared in animated form in the Captain N: The Game Master episode "Battle of the Baseball Know-It-Alls", this time voiced by Canadian actor Blu Mankuma.

== Life after sports ==
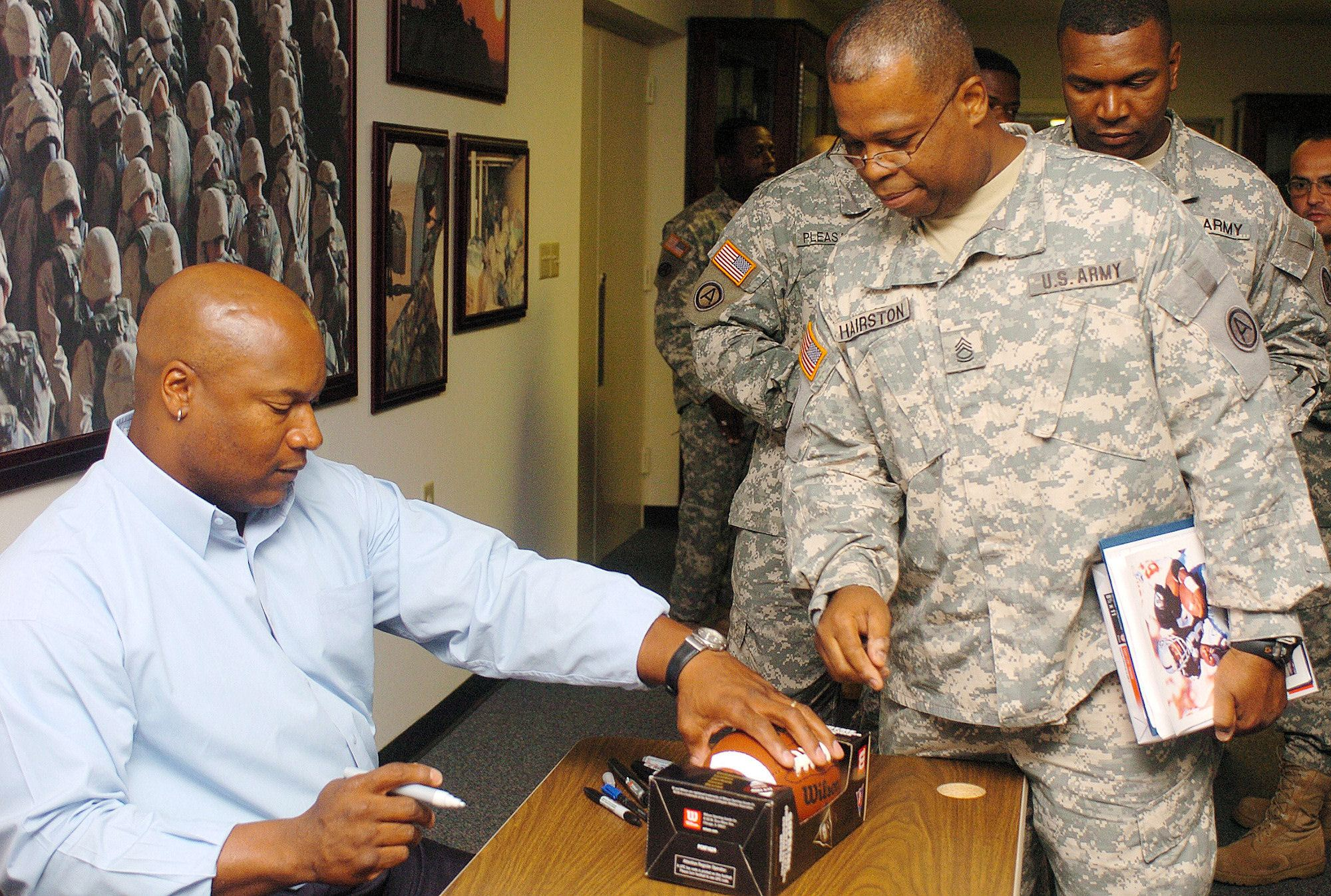
Jackson signed autographs for American soldiers in September 2007.

In 1995, Jackson completed his Bachelor of Science degree in Family and Child Development at Auburn to fulfill the promise he made to his mother.

Through the 1990s, Jackson dabbled in acting, having made several television guest appearances first on The Fresh Prince of Bel-Air in 1990 as well as Lois & Clark: The New Adventures of Superman, Moesha, and Married... with Children. He later appeared in small roles in the films The Chamber, The Pandora Project and Fakin' Da Funk.

Jackson served as the President of the HealthSouth Sports Medicine Council, part of Birmingham, Alabama-based HealthSouth Corporation.

The Chicago White Sox chose Jackson to throw the ceremonial first pitch before Game 2 of the 2005 World Series. The White Sox went on to win that game on a ninth-inning walk-off home run, then swept the Houston Astros for their first championship in 88 years.

In 2007, Jackson became part-owner and CEO of the new Bo Jackson Elite Sports Complex, an 88,000-square-foot (8,200 m^{2}) multi-sport dome facility in Lockport, Illinois. His other investments include food company N'Genuity. In 2009, he reflected on his business career launched upon his sports success, "I was good for sports, but sports was great to Bo Jackson."

In 2007, Nike released a set of Nike Dunk shoes honoring Bo Jackson. The set featured three colorways based on previously released Nike shoes: the "Bo Knows" Trainer I, Trainer 91 and Medicine Ball Trainer III.

On May 9, 2009, Jackson delivered the commencement speech at Auburn University's graduation ceremony, about the benefits of stepping out of one's comfort zone.

In 2009, he joined the board of Burr Ridge Bank and Trust. In 2013, the bank was acquired by First Community Financial Bank, who retained him as a board member. In 2017, First Community was acquired by Busey Bank, and Jackson left the board.

On July 12, 2010, Jackson threw the ceremonial first pitch before the 2010 Home Run Derby at Angel Stadium and participated in the celebrity softball game. In December 2010, he was named a 2011 winner of the NCAA Silver Anniversary Award, given annually to six former NCAA student-athletes for distinguished career accomplishment on the 25th anniversary of their college graduation.

On January 22, 2014, Jackson rejoined the Chicago White Sox as an ambassador for the team — joining the ranks of Frank Thomas, Minnie Miñoso, Carlton Fisk, Ron Kittle, Carlos May, and Bill Melton.

Jackson was inducted into the Baseball Reliquary's Shrine of the Eternals in 2016. Jackson's number 34 jerseys are still sold by the Las Vegas Raiders.

Working with his brand Promise Nutraceuticals, Jackson announced a line of CBD products called Hero Brand CBD in November 2021.

== Personal life ==
Jackson has been married to Linda (née Garrett), a rehabilitation counselor, since 1987. The couple met at Auburn, where Linda received her master's degree. They have three children: son Garrett, born 1986, son Nicholas, born 1988, and daughter Morgan, born 1989. Jackson and his family live in Burr Ridge, Illinois.

In a 2017 interview with USA Today, Jackson said he never would have played football if he had known the health risks associated with it. "I wish I had known about all of those head injuries, but no one knew that. And the people that did know that, they wouldn't tell anybody," he said. "The game has gotten so violent, so rough. We're so much more educated on this CTE stuff (chronic traumatic encephalopathy), there's no way I would ever allow my kids to play football today."

Jackson is known frequently to refer to himself in the third person, a habit he has had since his childhood due to his severe stutter; which made it difficult for him to say "I".

Jackson's great-nephew Shedrick Jackson played for the Las Vegas Raiders before being waived by the team on August 30, 2026.

On the Dan Patrick Show on February 5, 2026, Jackson announced he is a cancer survivor, having his prostate removed.

== Charity ==
In an effort to help his native state of Alabama, Jackson began a fundraiser known as "Bo Bikes Bama". The event began after a series of tornadoes devastated Alabama on April 27, 2011. The tornadoes claimed hundreds of lives and left many Alabama residents without power. The bike tour lasted five days where Jackson visited towns that had been demolished by the series of tornadoes. Bo was accompanied on this tour by celebrities such as Scottie Pippen, Ken Griffey Jr., Lance Armstrong, and Brett Favre. The five-day gran fondo was a one-time event, but has become an annual maximum single-day gran fondo lasting approximately 62 miles. The "Bo Bikes Bama" campaign has raised over $1.1 million for the Alabama Governor's Emergency Relief Fund. The 2025 "Bo Bikes Bama" event will be the final event.

In 2022, Jackson donated $170,000 to pay for the funeral expenses for the victims' families following the massacre of 19 children and two adults in Uvalde, Texas.

== See also ==
- List of multi-sport athletes
- List of athletes who played in Major League Baseball and the National Football League
