= Excelsior (Benny the Butcher album) =

Exclesior

EP by Benny the Butcher
- Released: May 2, 2025
- Genre: Hip-hop
- Length: 20:20
- Label: Black Soprano Family
- Producer: BSF; Daringer; Exit 44 Podcast; Harlem Zone; Harry Fraud; Moose Tarantino; Nunchuk101; Nyckles Productionz

Benny the Butcher chronology
Stabbed & Shot 2 (2024)	Exclesior (2025)

Singles from Excelsior
- 1. "Duffle Bag Hottie's Revenge" Released: April 30, 2025

Excelsior is the eighth extended play by American rapper Benny the Butcher, released independently by Black Soprano Family on May 2, 2025. It is a surprise album announced on April 30, 2025, on social media along with the release of its debut and only single, "Duffle Bag Hottie's Revenge". It features guest appearances from Boldy James, Styles P, P.R.E.M.O., Sule and Fuego Base. It is produced by BSF, Daringer, Exit 44 Podcast, Harlem Zone, Harry Fraud, Moose Tarantino, Nunchuk101 and Nyckles Productions.

== Promotion ==
On April 30, 2025, Pennick announced his fifth studio album, Excelsior, would be released on May 2, 2025, with the release of the single, "Duffle Bag Hottie's Revenge," featuring Boldy James co-occurring in the announcement and the single's music video. Sule and Fuego Base, two guest artists from "B$F," are signed into Pennick's Black Soprano Family imprint.

Continuing promotion for Excelsior, the music video of "Sign Language" premiered on May 7, 2025.

== Reception ==
Excelsior received somewhat positive reviews from critics. Quincy of Ratings Game Music said "Excelsíor doesn't try to rebrand Benny—it reinforces what fans already know: he may evolve, but he’ll never switch up".

== Track listing ==
Excelsior track listing
No.	Title	Writer(s)	Producer	Length
1.	"The Corner"	Jeremie Pennick	Exit 44 Podcast	0:30
2.	"I Am the Program" (featuring P.R.E.M.O.)	Pennick; James Hilliard; Ruben Johnson	Moose Tarantino	2:08
3.	"Sign Language"	Pennick; Carvena Jones; Tamando Phiri; Rory Quigley; Janet Sewell-Ulepic	Harry Fraud	2:50
4.	"Money & Power" (with Daringer featuring Skylar Blatt)	Pennick; Sade Johnson; Thomas Paladino	Daringer	3:19
5.	"Duffel Bag Hottie's Revenge" (featuring Boldy James)	Pennick; James Jones III; Colin Simson	Nunchuk101	3:45
6.	"Toxic" (featuring Styles P)	Pennick; David Styles	BSF	3:55
7.	"BSF" (with Black Soprano Family featuring Sule and Fuego Base)	Pennick; Christopher Chapman; Sule DeNully; Howard Fickling; Nicolas Wathieu	Harlem Zone; Nyckles Productionz	3:53
Total length:				20:20

=== Notes ===
- "Money & Power" is stylized "$ & Power"
- "BSF" is stylized "B$F"

== Personnel ==
Credits adapted from Tidal.

- Benny the Butcher – rap vocals
- John Sparkz – mastering, mixing
- Jonathan Mason – recording
- Big Pha – spoken word on "The Corner"
- P.R.E.M.O. – spoken word on "I Am the Program"
- Skylar Blatt – vocals on "Money & Power"
- Boldy James – rap vocals on "Duffel Bag Hottie's Revenge"
- Styles P – rap vocals on "Toxic"
- Sule – rap vocals on "BSF"
- Fuego Base – rap vocals on "BSF"
