= Manger on McNichols =

Studio album by Boldy James and Sterling Toles
- Released: July 22, 2020
- Recorded: 2007–2018
- Genre: Jazz rap; experimental hip-hop; gangsta rap; chamber jazz
- Length: 42:49
- Label: Sector 7-G
- Producer: Sterling Toles

Boldy James chronology
The Price of Tea in China (2020)	Manger on McNichols (2020)	The Versace Tape (2020)

Sterling Toles chronology
Archival Arteries of Sterling Toles (2016)	Manger on McNichols (2020)	The Sound of Manger on McNichols (2023)

Manger on McNichols is a collaborative studio album by American rapper Boldy James and producer Sterling Toles, released on July 22, 2020, through Sector 7-G Recordings. It has been described as a "deeply personal" album, with a focus on James's Detroit upbringing and his strained relationship with his parents. The album has received attention for its use of live jazz instrumentation, as well as a lengthy and complex recording process, which lasted over a decade. The album features guest appearances from rappers Dej Loaf (Note: Credited as "First Lady Deja;)".) and Louie P. Newton.

Initially conceived as a personal project between James and Toles, the first recording sessions for Manger on McNichols were held from 2007 to 2010 in Toles's makeshift basement studio. In the following years, Toles continued to work on the album by bringing in over twenty Detroit musicians to provide layers over the original boom bap backing tracks, including cellist Mother Cyborg, percussionist Jugal Kishore Dasa and electric bassist Bubz Fiddler. The album was completed in mid-2018, when James recorded his final vocals for two remaining instrumental sections.

Manger on McNichols received critical acclaim upon its release, with critics praising Toles's jazz-influenced production and James's evocative storytelling. Several publications named it one of the best hip-hop albums of 2020.

== Background and recording ==
Sterling Toles moved to eastside Detroit in 2000, starting a studio near the Detroit River. Toles's first encounter with Boldy James was during an engineering session with one of Toles's friends named Murf.

James continued to come to Toles's studio to rap on beats he had brought with him, while Toles worked on his debut album Resurget Cineribus (2005). After the album was finished, Toles and James recorded their first song as a duo in 2007. During this period, Toles "kept asking [James] to be more personal" with his lyrics. From 2007 to 2010, James recorded most of his vocals for Manger on McNichols. In 2010, sessions slowed down as James began going to Chicago to record with his cousin Chuck Inglish.

After the initial sessions, Toles was left with an album's worth of songs, with production he described as "pretty much chopped samples and drums". Over the following years, Toles would meet various musicians from Detroit who would contribute to the album, such as artist and cellist Mother Cyborg, percussionist Jugal Kishore Dasa (who ended up playing mridanga and harmonium on the album), bassist Bubz Fiddler and "personal woodwind section" Rafael Leafar. "Everyone would come to my place and play wherever they wanted to on the album", Toles said. He continued to edit, arrange and mix the album, which had grown to involve over twenty musicians.

In mid-2018, Toles offered James a copy of what he assumed was a finished album. James subsequently recorded new lyrics for the end of the track "Birth of Bold (The Christening)", and "Requiem"—both of which were previously instrumentals—thus completing recording.

== Reception ==
Professional ratings
Review scores
Source	Rating
AllMusic	4.5/5 stars
Pitchfork	7.7/10

Manger on McNichols received critical acclaim from music critics. Andy Kellman of AllMusic called the album "a testament to Toles' vision and patience" and praised "James' consistency as an indefatigable sage". Yousef Srour of KCSB-FM singled out Toles's production, claiming that it was the "most integral part" of the album and that the "instrumentals take on a life of their own". Similarly, Andrew Sacher of BrooklynVegan called the live jazz-band instrumentation "genuinely breathtaking" and that the album was "as immersive as modern jazz-rap classics like To Pimp a Butterfly and Room 25". He included the album on his "50 Best Rap Albums of 2020" year-end list, ranking it at number 6.

Nadine Smith of Pitchfork gave a positive review, highlighting James's more personal lyrics: "His writing is even deeper and his focus more intense on Manger on McNichols. It's not just Detroit that's depicted in detail—Boldy also writes his way through some of his most traumatic memories." Tom Breihan of Stereogum called the album "heavy" and "beautiful", and also praised James's empathetic writing.

=== Year-end lists ===
Select year-end rankings of Manger on McNichols
Publication	List	Rank	Ref.
Beats Per Minute	BPM's Top 50 Albums of 2020	43	
BrooklynVegan	50 Best Rap Albums of 2020	6	
Hip Hop Golden Age	The Best Hip Hop Albums of 2020	12	
Treble	Top 20 Hip-Hop Albums of 2020	—	

== Track listing ==
Manger on McNichols track listing
No.	Title	Length
1.	"Medusa"	3:26
2.	"Welcome to 76" (featuring Dej Loaf)	3:56
3.	"Detroit River Rock"	3:58
4.	"B.B. Butcher"	4:17
5.	"Middle of Next Month"	4:14
6.	"The Safe (The Womb)"	0:52
7.	"Mommy Dearest (A Eulogy)"	4:51
8.	"Birth of Bold (The Christening)"	4:57
9.	"Requiem"	2:48
10.	"Why Are You in Her(e)?"	0:59
11.	"Got Flicked (The Rebirth)" (featuring Louie P. Newton)	8:31
Total length:		42:49

== Personnel ==
Credits adapted from Bandcamp.

- Boldy James – lead vocals
- Sterling Toles – production
- Josh Bonati – mastering
- Wes Taylor – design

=== Musicians ===
"Medusa"

- James Boggs – introduction
- Nick Bruno – additional vocals
- Mother Cyborg – cello
- Bubz Fiddler – bass guitar
- Mike Higgins – drums

"Welcome to 76"

- Rafael Leafar – flute
- Mike Blank – alto saxophone
- Jugal Kishore Dasa – mridanga, harmonium
- adrienne maree brown – background vocals
- Dej Loaf – additional vocals

"Detroit River Rock"

- Leland Stein – guitar
- Rafael Leafar – cornet
- James Tolison – trombone
- Hugh Whitaker – bass guitar

"B.B. Butcher"

- Hugh Whitaker – bass guitar
- Vel the King – drums

"The Middle of Next Month"

- Emily Rogers – bass guitar

"Mommy Dearest (A Eulogy)"

- LaChe – choir
- Bubz Fiddler – bass guitar
- Mike Higgins – drums
- Mother Cyborg – cello
- James Tollison – rombone
- Rafael Leafar – flute, tenor saxophone
- Jugal Kishore Dasa – vocals, mridanga, harmonium

"Birth of Bold (The Christening)"

- Ian Fink – Wurlitzer, synth bass
- Asante – vocoder
- Emily Rogers – bass guitar
- Rafael Leafar – EWI

"Requiem"

- Mother Cyborg – cello
- Bubz Fiddler – bass guitar

"Got Flicked (The Rebirth)"

- Louie P. Newton – featured
- Mike Blank – alto saxophone
- Rafael Leafar – EWI, flute, bass flute
- Yakoob – synth bass, synth pad
- Kesswa – background vocals
