= Boldy James & the Alchemist =

American hip hop duo

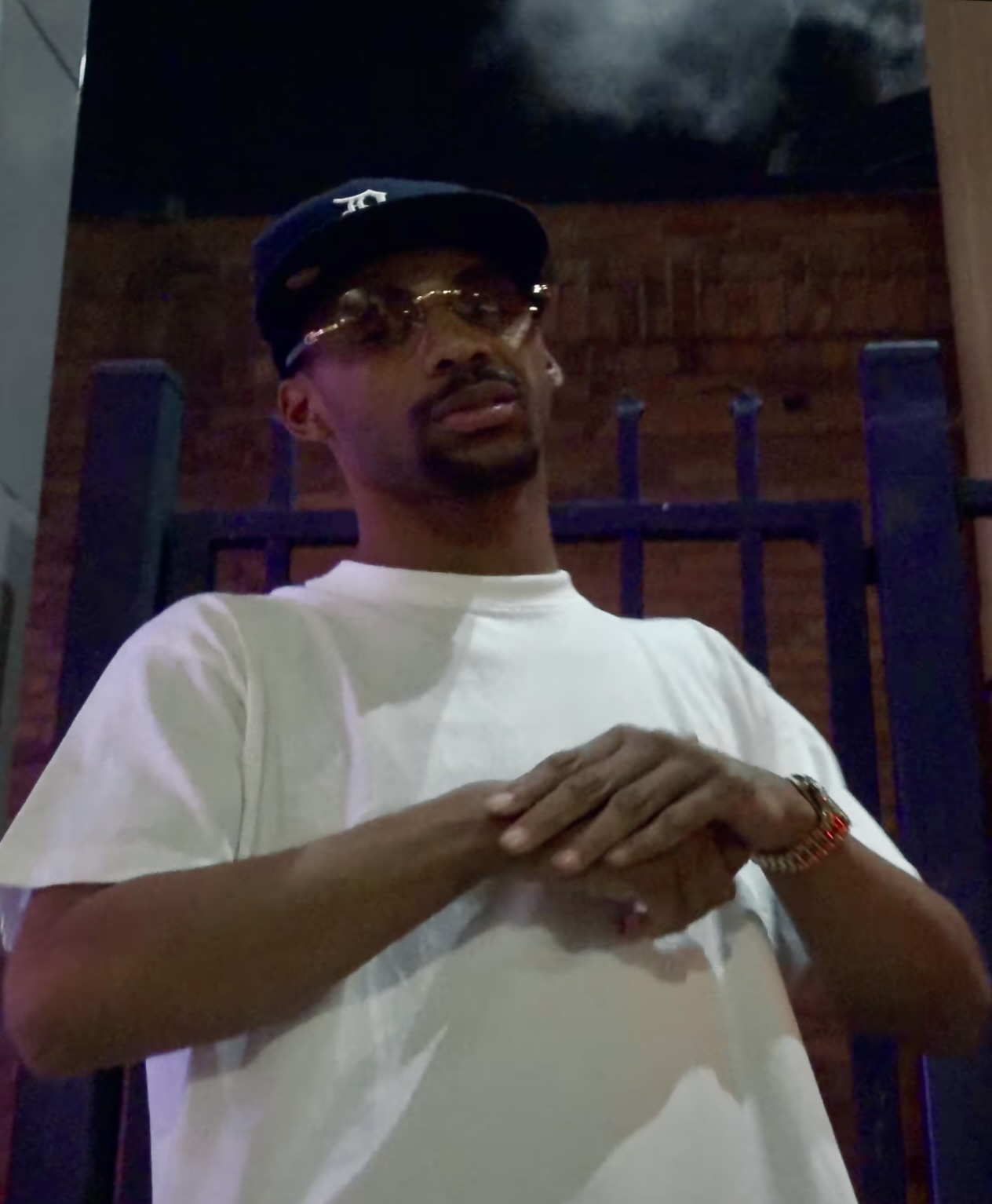
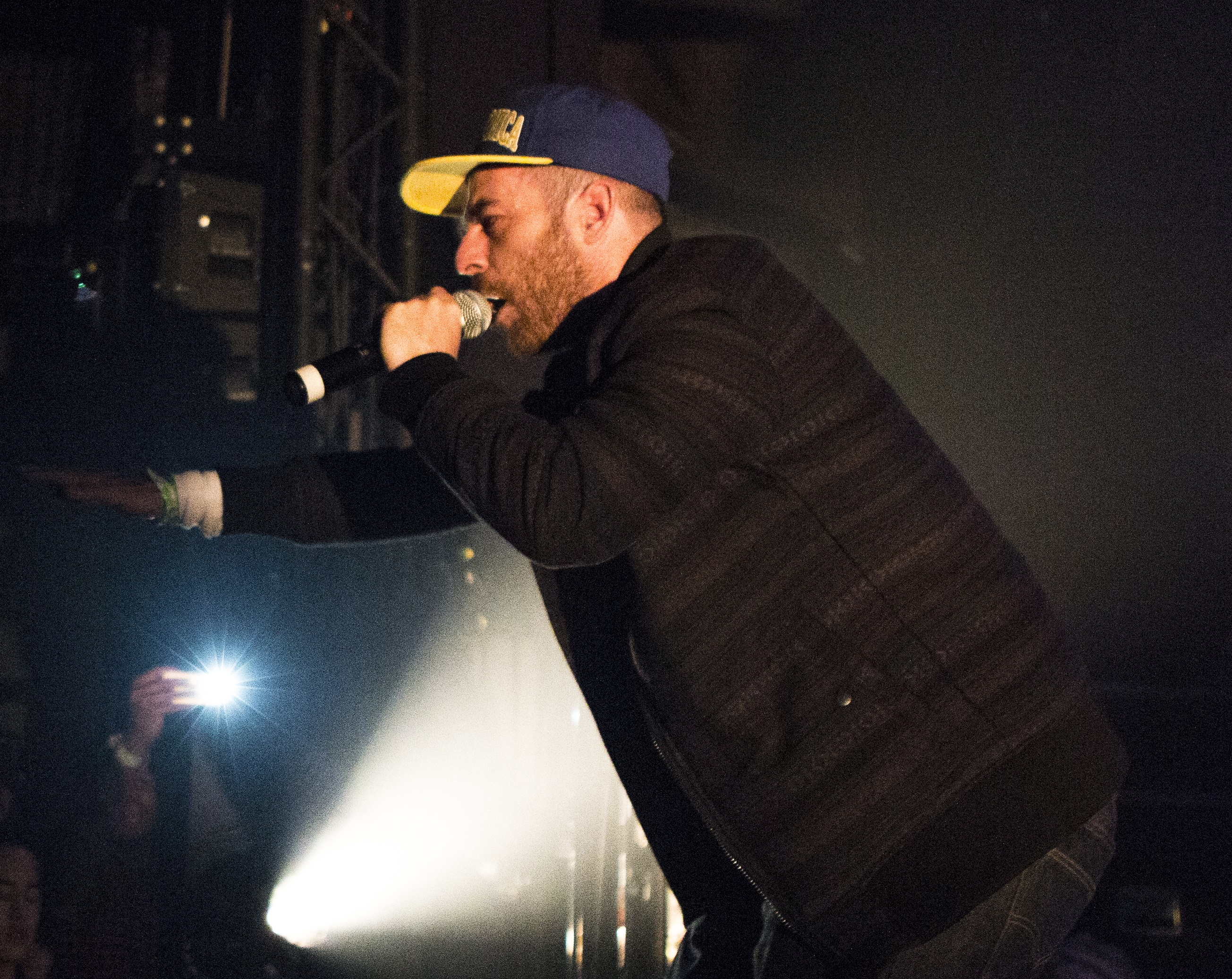
- Boldy James (left) and the Alchemist (right)

Background information
- Origin: Detroit, Michigan, U.S. Beverly Hills, California, U.S.
- Genres: Hip hop
- Years active: 2012–present
- Labels: ALC; Decon; Mass Appeal
- Members: Boldy James; The Alchemist

Boldy James & the Alchemist are an American hip hop duo, composed of Detroit, Michigan rapper Boldy James and Beverly Hills, California producer The Alchemist.

In 2012, Boldy James signed a record deal with Decon for the Alchemist produced album; My 1st Chemistry Set was released on October 15, 2013.

Their second studio album, The Price of Tea in China, was released on February 7, 2020, under ALC Records.

== Discography ==
=== Studio albums ===
- My 1st Chemistry Set (2013)
- The Price of Tea in China (2020)
- Bo Jackson (2021)
- Super Tecmo Bo (2021)

=== EPs ===
- Boldface (2019)
