= My 1st Chemistry Set =

Studio album by Boldy James & The Alchemist
- Released: October 15, 2013
- Recorded: 2013
- Genre: Hip hop
- Length: 49:59
- Label: Decon; Mass Appeal
- Producer: The Alchemist

Boldy James & The Alchemist chronology
My 1st Chemistry Set (2013)	The Price of Tea in China (2020)

Singles from My 1st Chemistry Set
- 1. "Moochie" Released: September 12, 2013; 2. "Reform School" Released: October 7, 2013

(M.1.C.S.) My 1st Chemistry Set is the debut studio album by Detroit rapper Boldy James and producer The Alchemist, released on October 15, 2013 through Decon. It was preceded by Boldy James' EP, Grand Quarters (2013). M.1.C.S. was entirely produced by The Alchemist and features guest appearances from Action Bronson, Domo Genesis, Earl Sweatshirt, Freeway, King Chip and Vince Staples among others. On September 12, 2013, the lead single from the album, "Moochie," was leaked onto the Internet. The following single, "Reform School," was leaked on October 7, 2013. M.1.C.S. was generally well received by music critics. Complex named it amongst the best albums of October 2013.

== Critical reception ==
Professional ratings
Review scores
Source	Rating
AllMusic	3.5/5 stars
Complex	(positive)
eMusic	3/5 stars
Exclaim!	7/10
HipHopDX	3.5/5 stars
Pitchfork Media	7.4/10
XXL	4/5 (XL)

Upon its release, My 1st Chemistry Set was met with generally favorable reviews from music critics. Exclaim! reviewer, Chayne Japal, gave the album a seven out of ten, saying "Throughout, the simplified rawness of Boldy James's style matches up perfectly with Alchemist's minimalist production, offering up yet another sneaky slow-burner of a collab from the journeyman producer." Pitchfork Media's Jayson Greene, gave the album a 7.4 out of ten, saying "There are guests that breeze through. [...] But none of them eclipse Boldy, who makes the most of this opportunity and delivers some of the best verses of his career. He has been steadily deepening, as a writer and rapper, and by now, the lousy emotional weather of QB rap is his own, a personal storm cloud he generates wherever he goes."

Jay Balfour of HipHopDX gave the album a 3.5 out of five, saying "Throughout the whole project, James is consistent, even when transitioning from understated brags to self-conscious street worries. Particularly with his penchant for witty slang, his style doesn't seem derived or lifted despite obvious similarities. Still, he’s sure footed enough to know where he stands." Winston Cook-Wilson of eMusic gave the album three stars out of five, saying "This type of content, as well as Alchemist's inventively blunted, Return of the Mac-style beats, will increase the comparisons to Prodigy that James is probably used to getting by now. But though his music is situated in that tradition of gangsta rap, he's distinguished from this comparison and others by a love of the sound of words — as much as their import — which manifests itself in a singular way. He crafts deceptively complex internal rhyme schemes, and positions his vowel sounds close enough to one another to continue the patterns until he's exhausted their potential. He uses words carefully and as sparingly as possible, which often makes the breathing room left after a murmured threat as important as the line itself."

AllMusic reviewer, David Jeffries, gave the album three and a half stars out of five, saying "Vivid details throughout the album seem like ammunition for any possible prosecution team, so be aware, this one is brutal, nihilistic, frightening, and unforgivable, but it's "eye for an eye" music with a creative spark, and a great step toward the realm of The Infamous." XXL reviewer, Chris Mench, gave the album an XL, saying "Despite occasional moments of levity, the album is a hazy trip through the triumphs and tragedies of gang life on the streets of one of America’s most troubled cities. Boldy James' lyrical finesse and knack for storytelling are on full display as he sails over powerful, yet understated production from Alchemist. His no rush delivery allows the weight of his stories to sink in, and ultimately he succeeds at putting Detroit on the map, this time for the right reasons."

== Track listing ==
- All tracks were produced by Alchemist.

No.	Title	Writer(s)	Length
1.	"Bold"	Daniel Maman; James Jones III	3:13
2.	"Consideration"	Maman; Jones	3:01
3.	"Moochie"	Maman; Jones	3:30
4.	"Traction" (featuring Action Bronson)	Maman; Jones; Arian Asllani	3:46
5.	"You Know"	Maman; Jones	4:46
6.	"Surprise Party" (featuring King Chip and Freeway)	Maman; Jones; Charles Worth; Leslie Pridgen	4:20
7.	"What's the Word"	Maman; Jones	4:22
8.	"Rappies" (featuring Peechie Green and Mafia Double Dee)	Maman; Jones	4:18
9.	"Cobo Hall"	Maman; Jones	3:21
10.	"Give Me a Reason" (featuring Vince Staples)	Maman; Jones; Vincent Staples	4:12
11.	"400 Thousand"	Maman; Jones	3:37
12.	"Reform School" (featuring Earl Sweatshirt, Da$H, and Domo Genesis)	Maman; Jones; Thebe Kgositsile; Darien Dash; Dominique Cole	4:01
13.	"KY Jellybeans"	Maman; Jones	3:32
Total length:			49:59

== Personnel ==
Credits for My 1st Chemistry Set adapted from AllMusic and from the album liner notes.

- James Clay "Boldy James" Jones — composer, primary artist
- Alan "The Alchemist" Maman — composer, engineer, mixing, producer
- Arian "Action Bronson" Asllani — composer, featured artist
- Peter Bittenbender — art direction, design
- Clayton Blaha — public relations
- Dominique Marquis "Domo Genesis" Cole — composer, featured artist
- Band Boy Cook — engineer
- Da$H — composer, featured artist
- Mafia Double Dee — composer, featured artist
- Peechie Green — composer, featured artist
- Thebe "Earl Sweatshirt" Kgositsile — composer, featured artist
- Joe LaPorta — mastering
- Michael Lukowski — art direction, design
- Xavier Powers — composer
- Leslie "Freeway" Pridgen — composer
- Vince Staples — composer, featured artist
- Gohard Tae — vocal engineer
- Gerard Victor — photography
- Charles "King Chip" Worth — composer, featured artist
