= This Thing of Ours (EP) =

2021 EP by The Alchemist

EP by the Alchemist
- Released: April 30, 2021
- Genre: Hip-hop
- Length: 20:44
- Label: ALC
- Producer: The Alchemist

The Alchemist chronology
Haram (2021)	This Thing of Ours (2021)	Bo Jackson (2021)

Singles from This Thing of Ours
- 1. "Nobles" Released: April 23, 2021

This Thing of Ours is the fifth solo extended play by American record producer the Alchemist. It was released on April 30, 2021, by ALC Records.

== Release and promotion ==
On April 12, 2021, the Alchemist, Earl Sweatshirt, Navy Blue, Sideshow, Boldy James, Pink Siifu and Maxo all posted on their Instagram accounts the same section of what would later be revealed to be the cover art, with the caption "4/30". The EP was formally announced by the Alchemist on April 23, with the release of the single "Nobles" and an accompanying music video.

Upon the digital and physical release of the EP, a VHS tape was also released including all of the songs and music videos each by a different director. The video for "TV Dinners" was released on the Alchemist's YouTube channel on April 30. The music videos for "Holy Hell" followed on May 7, 2021, and finally "Loose Change" on May 14.

== Track listing ==
All tracks are produced by the Alchemist.

This Thing of Ours track listing
No.	Title	Writer(s)	Length
1.	"Nobles" (featuring Earl Sweatshirt and Navy Blue)	Alan Maman; Thebe Kgositsile; Sage Elsesser	2:16
2.	"TV Dinners" (featuring Boldy James and Sideshow)	Maman; James Jones III; Sideshow	2:57
3.	"Holy Hell" (featuring Pink Siifu and Maxo)	Maman; Livingston Matthews; Maxamilian Allen	3:10
4.	"Loose Change" (featuring Earl Sweatshirt)	Maman; Kgositsile	1:58
5.	"Nobles" (Instrumental)	Maman	2:16
6.	"TV Dinners" (Instrumental)	Maman	2:57
7.	"Holy Hell" (Instrumental)	Maman	3:10
8.	"Loose Change" (Instrumental)	Maman	1:58
Total length:			20:44

Notes

- In July 2021, "Nobles" and its instrumental were removed off of music streaming services due to sample clearance issues. That September, an edited version was re-released to services.
- "Loose Change" contains an uncleared sample of "Ne zna se ko si" (1981), composed by Kire Mitrev and penned by Zafir Hadžimanov, and performed by Kim Band.

== This Thing of Ours 2 ==
This Thing of Ours 2

EP by the Alchemist
- Released: October 8, 2021
- Genre: Hip-hop
- Length: 23:36
- Label: ALC
- Producer: The Alchemist

The Alchemist chronology
Bo Jackson (2021)	This Thing of Ours 2 (2021)	Super Tecmo Bo (2021)

Singles from This Thing of Ours 2
- 1. "Miracle Baby" Released: October 1, 2021

On September 28, 2021, the Alchemist announced the sequel EP, This Thing of Ours 2, to be released on October 8. The lead single "Miracle Baby" was released on October 1, with an accompanying music video. A music video for "Lossless" was released alongside the EP on October 8, followed by "Wildstyle" on October 15.

=== Track listing ===
All tracks are produced by the Alchemist.

This Thing of Ours 2 track listing
No.	Title	Writer(s)	Length
1.	"Miracle Baby" (featuring Mavi)	Alan Maman; Omavi Minder	2:31
2.	"Lossless" (featuring Mike)	Maman; Michael Bonema	2:17
3.	"Flying Spirit" (featuring Bruiser Brigade (Danny Brown, J.U.S, Fat Ray, and Bruiser Wolf)	Maman; Daniel Sewell; J.U.S; Ray Boggues II; Devaul Neal	3:37
4.	"Wildstyle" (featuring Zelooperz)	Maman; Walter Williams	1:29
5.	"6 Five Heartbeats" (featuring Vince Staples)	Maman; Vincent Staples	1:54
Total length:			11:48

This Thing of Ours 2 vinyl side B
No.	Title	Writer(s)	Length
6.	"Miracle Baby" (Instrumental)	Maman	2:31
7.	"Lossless" (Instrumental)	Maman	2:17
8.	"Flying Spirit" (Instrumental)	Maman	3:37
9.	"Wildstyle" (Instrumental)	Maman	1:29
10.	"6 Five Heartbeats" (Instrumental)	Maman	1:54
Total length:			23:36
