= Seraphine Collective =

Nonprofit organization

The Seraphine Collective is a Detroit-based feminist DJ network for women, femme, and non-binary DJs, musicians, and artists. The group provides workshops, organizes events, and provides space and resources for under-resourced and under-represented artists through its collectively run record label and venue.

== History ==
The Seraphine Collective was founded in 2013 by Lauren Rossi, who was discouraged by the lack of representation of female artists in music. Rossi started a blog documenting the work of female musicians, which led to the formation of the Seraphine Collective. The group organizes training workshops, the Best Fest Forever music festival, shows, and they have released several mixtapes.

Notable members of the collective include Dina Bankole, Rachel Thompson, Miz Korona. Other noteworthy affiliates include Mother Cyborg, Girls Rock Detroit and the Foundation for Women in Hip Hop. The Seraphine Collective is a sponsored project of the Allied Media Projects.

In 2016, the collective was a recipient of the Knight Arts Challenge Grant. They have also received funding from the Michigan Council for Arts and Cultural Affairs and the Awesome Foundation.
