= Mother Cyborg =

American artist, DJ and educator

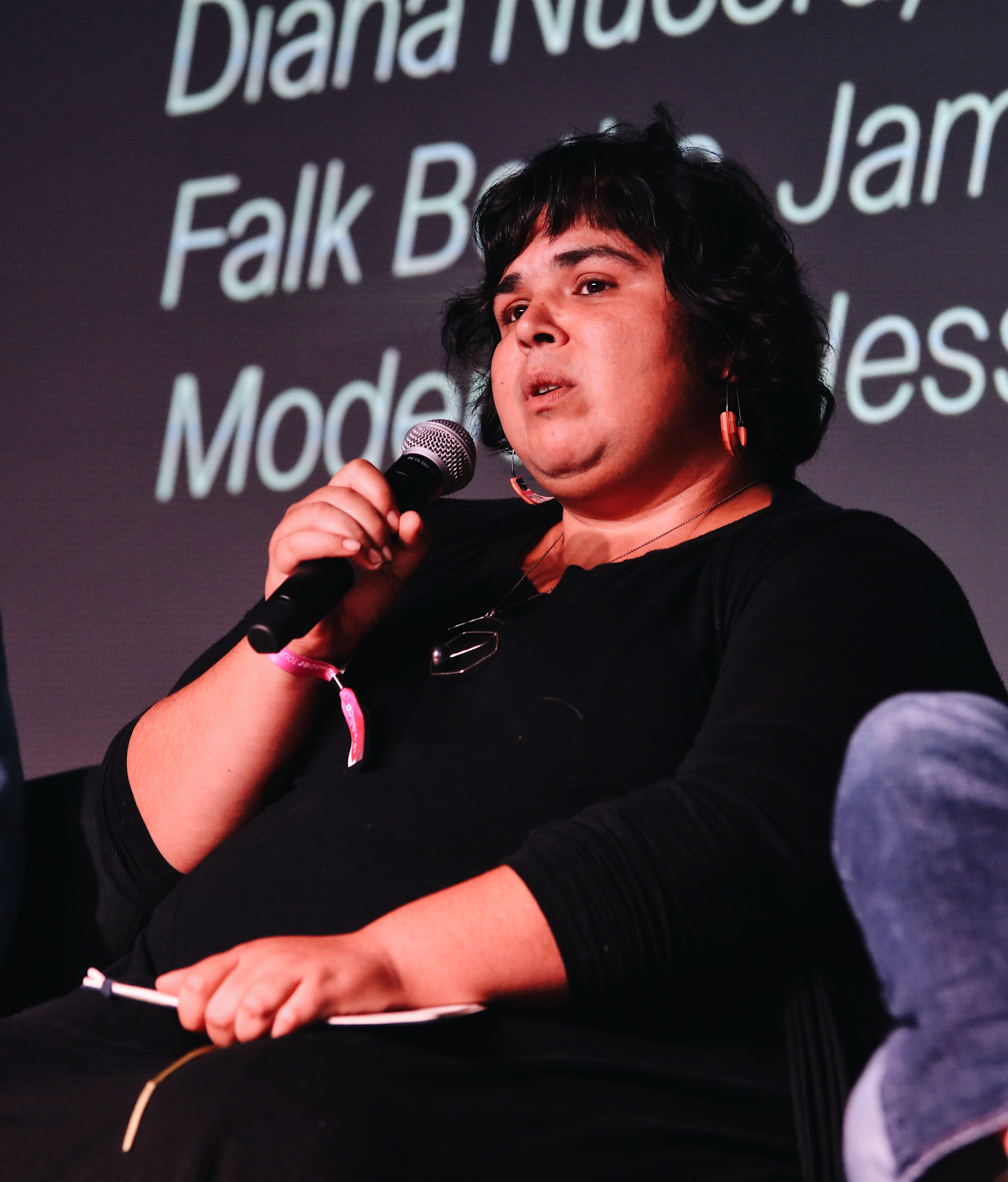
- Mother Cyborg (2019).
- Born: Diana J. Nucera; Chicago
- Known for: Artist, DJ, and educator

Diana J. Nucera, better known by her stage name Mother Cyborg, is a Detroit-based artist, DJ, and educator. Born in Chicago and raised in Frankfort, Indiana. Nucera began using the name Mother Cyborg on October 11, 2011, while DJing at a Halloween party. Mother Cyborg continued DJing, hosting a monthly gig, deemed the "Temple of Cyborg", at Detroit's Temple Bar as well as performing her own music live. Mother Cyborg released her debut album Pressure Systems on April 29, 2017.

== Music ==
Mother Cyborg's music blends house, techno, electronica, dance and ambient trip-hop as well as featuring her own cello playing. She has described her music as connecting to her work in technology, with the goal of creating space for emotions to be present and to elevate the consciousness.

Mother Cyborg has been involved in local music education in Detroit and in the Seraphine Collective, a collaborative support network of women/femme/nonbinary musicians, artists & DJ's in Detroit. Through the Seraphine Collective, Mother Cyborg teaches students how to DJ in a four-week course called "Beatmatch Brunch." Mother Cyborg donated the proceeds from her record release party for Pressure Systems to the Seraphine Collective.

== Community technology work ==
Nucera founded the Detroit Community Technology Project, a sponsored project of the Allied Media Projects. The Detroit Community Technology Project empowers communities to use media and technology as a way of exploring solutions to challenges they face. In her role as a community technology educator, Nucera has authored the Opening Data Zine and the Teaching Community Technology Handbook. From 2016 to 2018, the Detroit Community Technology Project partnered with Detroit organizations Grace in Action Collectives, WNUC Community Radio, and the Church of the Messiah's Boulevard Harambe Program on the Equitable Internet Initiative. The program was designed to increase Internet access through the distribution of shared Gigabit Internet connections in three underserved neighborhoods: Vernor/Lawndale in Southwest Detroit, Islandview in Southeast Detroit, and the North End. Nucera appears speaking about this work in the Vice documentary short Meet the People Building Their Own Internet in Detroit.

Nucera was a 2019 Literary Arts Fellow with Kresge Arts in Detroit.
