= Boldy James =

American rapper (born 1982)

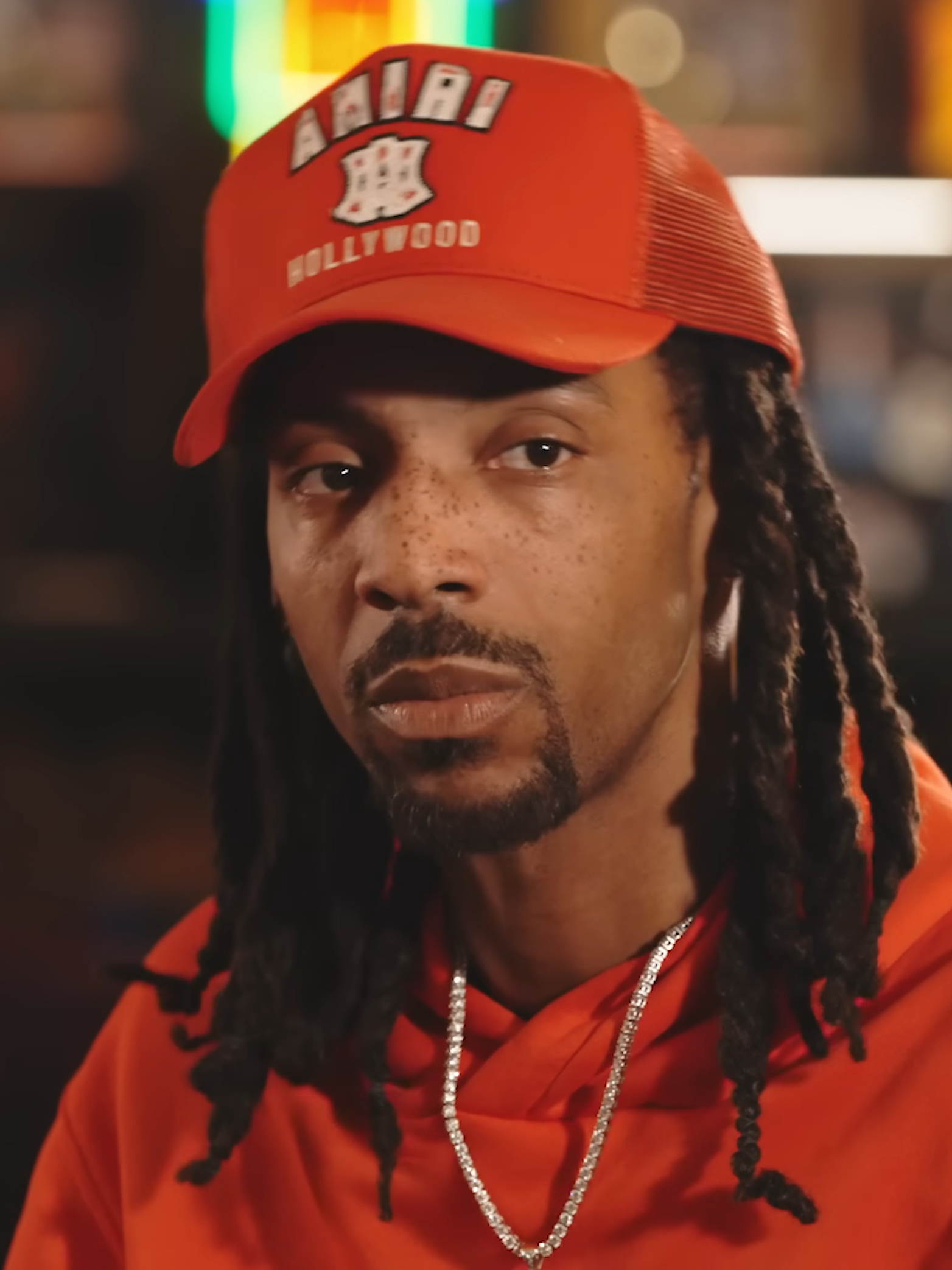
- Boldy James in 2025
- Born: James Clay Jones III; August 9, 1982 (age 44); Atlanta, Georgia, U.S.
- Occupations: Rapper; songwriter
- Children: 6
- Relatives: Snoop Dogg; Chuck Inglish
- Musical career
- Also known as: Bo Jack; Mr. Ten08
- Origin: Detroit, Michigan, U.S.
- Genres: Underground rap; hardcore hip hop; jazz rap; alternative hip hop
- Years active: 2009–present
- Labels: Griselda; Decon; Mass Appeal
- Member of: Boldy James & the Alchemist; Boldy Bad Man
- Website: https://boldyjamesmusic.myshopify.com/

James Clay Jones III (born August 9, 1982), better known by his stage name Boldy James, is an American rapper. He is a member of the hip hop collective Griselda. Recognized for his deep voice and laid-back delivery of vivid stories, he often explores themes of drug trade and street life. After his debut album My 1st Chemistry Set (2013), James has since released a wide discography of both studio albums as well as mixtapes and EPs, often releasing multiple projects in a year.

His reunion with the Alchemist—who also produced his debut—on The Price of Tea in China (2020) saw him gain significant recognition, along with his jazz-infused collaboration album with Sterling Toles, Manger on McNichols, released that same year. He frequently collaborates with other members of the Griselda collective, and has worked with producers such as Conductor Williams, Jay Versace, Harry Fraud, Nicholas Craven, Real Bad Man, and Futurewave, among others.

== Early life ==
Jones was born on August 9, 1982, in Atlanta, Georgia to James Clay Jones Jr. and Toni K. Broadus. In 1983, Jones and Broadus returned to their original home of Detroit, Michigan with their son after Jones was wounded in the line of duty serving as a police officer. They resided on the Eastside of Detroit with Jones' grandmother. In 1989, Jones' parents separated and his mother sent him and his younger sister to live with their father on Detroit's westside on Stahelin Hell Block near McNichols Road and the Southfield Freeway. Jones' love for music came to the forefront at the age of 12, when he performed in a middle school talent show and began writing his first raps shortly after. He attended high school at Detroit Cooley, and dropped out his freshman year. He got the name "Boldy James" from his friend, James Osely III, whom people in the neighborhood called "Boldy". Jones said, "he didn't rap, he just sold cocaine. I liked the name because his name was James too". When his friend was murdered, he decided to carry on with the name, using it to rap.

== Career ==
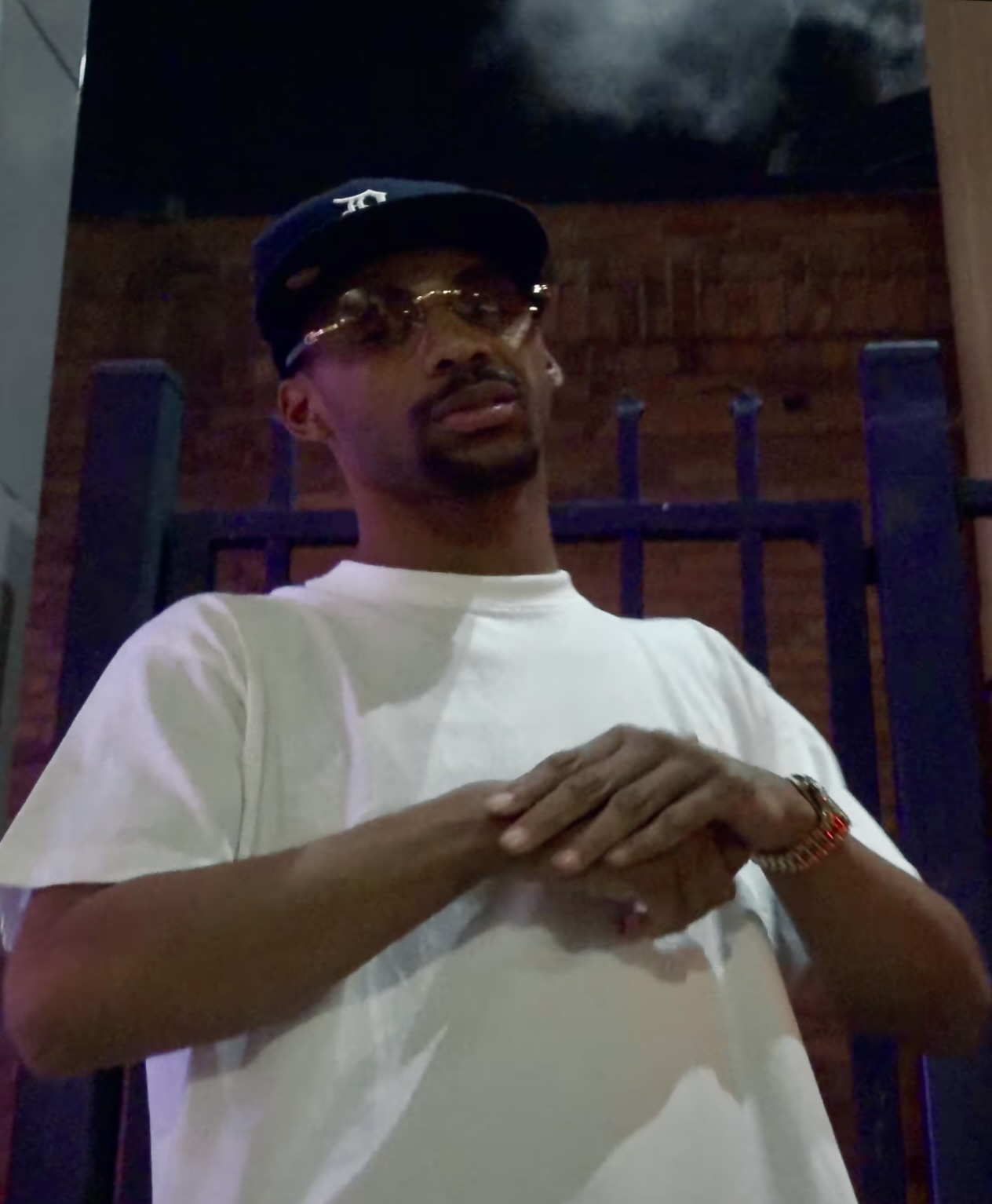
Jones in 2017

In 2009, Jones's first big break on the national scene came in the form of two features on The Cool Kids and Don Cannon's mixtape Merry Christmas, on the songs "BBQ Wings" and "Tires". That was followed up by his record "Gettin Flicked" appearing on The Cool Kids's 2010 mixtape Tacklebox. Also in 2010, he was featured on the Chip tha Ripper song "Fat Raps" remix alongside Big Sean, Asher Roth, Dom Kennedy and Chuck Inglish. On May 24, 2011, Jones released his solo debut mixtape Trappers Alley Pros and Cons. The project went on to be named by Pitchfork as one of 2011's Most Overlooked Projects. On February 27, 2012, he released his follow up mixtape, Consignment. On March 5, 2013, he released an EP titled Grand Quarters. On October 15, 2013, he released his debut album, My 1st Chemistry Set, entirely produced by The Alchemist. On May 22, 2014, it was announced that Jones, Bishop Nehru, and Fashawn were the first signees to Nas's Mass Appeal Records.

He left Mass Appeal in 2020 to sign with Westside Gunn's Griselda Records. With Griselda, he has released The Price of Tea in China, Manger on McNichols, and Bo Jackson, among other albums.

== Personal life ==
On January 9, 2023, Jones was involved in a car accident in Detroit, leaving him with a broken vertebrae, requiring intensive surgery.

Jones is a cousin of American rapper Chuck Inglish and is related to American rapper Snoop Dogg.

Jones has six children.

== Discography ==
=== Studio albums ===
List of studio albums, with selected details
Title	Album details
My 1st Chemistry Set (with The Alchemist)	Released: October 15, 2013; Label: Decon, Mass Appeal Entertainment; Formats: CD, digital download
The Price of Tea in China (with The Alchemist)	Released: February 7, 2020; Label: ALC; Formats: Streaming, digital download, CD, vinyl
Manger on McNichols (with Sterling Toles)	Released: July 22, 2020; Label: Sector 7-G; Formats: Streaming, digital download, vinyl
The Versace Tape	Released: August 14, 2020; Label: Griselda; Formats: Streaming, digital download
Real Bad Boldy (with Real Bad Man)	Released: December 11, 2020; Label: Real Bad Man; Formats: Streaming, digital download, CD, vinyl
Bo Jackson (with The Alchemist)	Released: August 13, 2021; Label: ALC; Formats: Streaming, digital download, CD, vinyl
Super Tecmo Bo (with The Alchemist)	Released: December 17, 2021; Label: ALC; Formats: Streaming, digital download, CD, vinyl
Killing Nothing (with Real Bad Man)	Released: May 20, 2022; Label: Real Bad Man; Formats: Streaming, digital download, CD, vinyl, cassette
Fair Exchange No Robbery (with Nicholas Craven)	Released: September 30, 2022; Label: Nicholas Craven Productions; Formats: Streaming, digital download, CD, vinyl, cassette
Mr. Ten08 (with Futurewave)	Released: November 4, 2022; Label: WAVGODMUSIC INC. / FXCKRXP; Formats: Streaming, digital download, CD, vinyl, cassette
Be That as It May (with Cuns)	Released: December 14, 2022; Label: Tuff Kong Records; Formats: Streaming, digital download, CD, vinyl, cassette
Indiana Jones (with RichGains)	Released: January 20, 2023; Label: Self-released; Formats: Streaming, digital download, vinyl
Penalty of Leadership (with Nicholas Craven)	Released: January 12, 2024; Label: Nicholas Craven Productions; Formats: Streaming, digital download, vinyl, cassette
Across the Tracks (with Conductor Williams)	Released: June 28, 2024; Label: Near Mint; Formats: Streaming, digital download, vinyl, cassette
The Bricktionary (with Harry Fraud)	Released: November 22, 2024; Label: Near Mint; Formats: Streaming, digital download, vinyl, cassette
Murder During Drug Traffic (with RichGains)	Released: January 3, 2025; Label: Self-released; Formats: Streaming, digital download
Permanent Ink	Released: January 24, 2025; Label: Royal House Recordings; Formats: Streaming, digital download
The Exorcism (with The Flaurist)	Released: February 11, 2025; Label: Unsigned Records; Formats: Digital download
Token of Appreciation (with Chuck Strangers)	Released: February 27, 2025; Label: Self-released; Formats: Streaming, digital download, vinyl
Hommage (with Antt Beatz)	Released: March 28, 2025; Label: Empire; Formats: Streaming, digital download
Alphabet Highway (with V Don)	Released: April 4, 2025; Label: Serious Soundz, RRC Music Co.; Formats: Streaming, digital download, vinyl
Conversational Pieces (with Real Bad Man)	Released: May 2, 2025; Label: Real Bad Man Records; Formats: Streaming, digital download, vinyl
Late to My Own Funeral (with Nicholas Craven)	Released: July 11, 2025; Label: Nicholas Craven Productions; Formats: Streaming, digital download, CD, vinyl, cassette
Criminally Attached (with Nicholas Craven)	Released: November 14, 2025; Label: Roc Nation; Formats: Streaming, digital download, vinyl, cassette

=== Extended plays ===
List of extended plays, with selected details
Title	EP details
Grand Quarters	Released: March 5, 2013; Label: Decon; Formats: CD, digital download
The Art of Rock Climbing	Released: January 27, 2017; Label: Mass Appeal; Formats: Streaming, digital download
Boldface (with The Alchemist)	Released: December 20, 2019; Label: ALC; Formats: Streaming, digital download
ADU (with Real Bad Man as Boldy Bad Man)	Released: January 16, 2023; Label: Real Bad Man, RRC Music; Formats: vinyl
Prisoner of Circumstance (with ChanHays)	Released: June 9, 2023; Label: Droppin Science Productions; Formats: Streaming, digital download, vinyl
1LB (One Lucky Bastard) (with Your Boy Posca)	Released: February 2024; Label: Near Mint; Formats: Vinyl, cassette
Hidden in Plain Sight (with whothehelliscarlo)	Released: December 20, 2024; Label: Westside Bike Club; Formats: Streaming, digital download
Magnolia Leflore (with Your Boy Posca)	Released: May 23, 2025; Label: Near Mint; Formats: Streaming, digital download, vinyl
ADU 2 (with Real Bad Man as Boldy Bad Man)	Released: November 4, 2025; Label: Real Bad Man, RRC Music; Formats: vinyl
Salvation For The Wicked (with Ransom & Nicholas Craven)	Released: February 12, 2026; Label: Momentum; Formats: Streaming, digital download, vinyl, CD
Manhunt (with Rome Streetz)	Released: February 27, 2026; Label: Mass Appeal; Formats: Streaming, digital download, vinyl, CD

=== Mixtapes ===
List of mixtapes, with year released
Title	Album details
Trappers Alley: Pros & Cons	Released: May 24, 2011; Label: Self-released; Formats: Digital download
Consignment: Favor For A Favor The Redi-rock Mixtape	Released: February 27, 2012; Label: Self-released; Formats: Digital download
Trappers Alley 2	Released: February 27, 2015; Label: Mass Appeal; Formats: Digital download
House of Blues	Released: February 24, 2017; Label: Mass Appeal; Formats: Streaming, digital download
Live at the Roxy (Caps & Tabs) (with M. Stacks)	Released: November 24, 2018; Label: Connected Everywhere, Concreatures 227; Formats: CD, digital download
Latr (Tabs & Caps)	Released: December 8, 2018; Label: Mass Appeal; Formats: Streaming, digital download

=== Singles ===
List of singles showing year released and album name
Title	Year	Album
"I Sold Dope All My Life"	2011	Trappers Alley: Pros & Cons
"Grittin" (featuring Peechie Green and Fat Ray)	2012	Non-album single
"Take Whats Ours" (featuring LOGIC and Aaron Williams)	2012	Consignment: Favor For A Favor
"For The Birds""	2013	Grand Quarters
"Brand New Chanel Kicks"	2024	Penalty of Leadership
"No Pun Intended"	2024	Penalty of Leadership
"Blocks & Ave’s" (Featuring Nuglife and Zombie Juice)	2024	Non-album single
"Yokohama Slim" (Featuring MadeinTYO)	2024	Non-album single
"Terms & Conditions"	2024	Across The Tracks
"Off White Lumberjack"	2024	Across The Tracks
"Cecil Fielder" (Featuring Tee Grizzley)	2024	The Bricktionary
"Super Mario"	2024	Hommage
"Dead Flowers"	2024	Hommage
"Shrink Wrap" (Featuring Babyface Ray)	2024	The Bricktionary
"Rabies" (Featuring Benny The Butcher)	2024	The Bricktionary
"Achilles"	2024	Murder During Drug Traffic
"Single File Line"	2025	Permanent Ink
"Whale Fishing"	2025	Token of Appreciation
"To You She A Dime"	2025	Non-album single
"Street Cred"	2025	Hommage
"Split The Bill"	2025	Alphabet Highway
"RSNS"	2025	Alphabet Highway
"It Factor" (Featuring El-P)	2025	Conversational Pieces
"Come Back Around" (Featuring dreamcastmoe)	2025	Conversational Pieces
"Nancy Botwin"	2025	Magnolia Leflore
"Spider Webbing Windshields"	2025	Late To My Own Funeral
"Nice Try Wrong Guy"	2025	Late To My Own Funeral
"COLLECTION PLATES"	2025	Salvation For The Wicked
"No Blemishes"	2025	Criminally Attached
"Infrared Dot Com"	2025	Criminally Attached

=== Guest appearances ===
List of guest appearances on album releases with other performing artists, showing year released and album name
Title	Year	Artist(s)	Album
"Fat Raps" (Remix)	2010	King Chip, Chuck Inglish, Big Sean, Asher Roth, Dom Kennedy	From Me to You: The Prelude to Gift Raps
"Roll Call"	2011	The Cool Kids, Asher Roth, King Chip	When Fish Ride Bicycles
"Criminal Enterprise"	2011	Chips, Dusty McFly, Keely	Couch Potato
"Stop the Show"	2011	Sir Michael Rocks, Payroll	Premier Politics
"Golden Midas"	2011	Asher Roth, Nico Segal, Greg Landfair Jr.	Pabst & Jazz
"Detroit Game"	2012	J Dilla, Chuck Inglish	Rebirth of Detroit
"Girl (I Used To Know)"	2012	JMSN	Priscilla
"The Kosmos Pt. 2 - Power Glove"	2012	The Alchemist	Russian Roulette
"Soul Fry" (Remix)	2012	Deniro Farrar, Shady Blaze	Kill or Be Killed
"Paramount"	2013	Phillie	Welcome to the Detroit Zoo
"Boat Races"	2013	TreeJay, DJ Clockwork, Larry Fisherman, Freddie Gibbs	Show Time
"Trying To Come Up"	2013	Roc Marciano	Marci Beaucoup
"Something To Cry For"	2014	Statik Selektah	What Goes Around
"Light This Fa Me"	2016	Chuck Inglish, Buddy	Ev Zepplin
"Same Damn Thing"	2016	Little Shalimar, eXquire, Ghostface Killah	Rubble Kings Soundtrack
"On The Set"	2017	The Cool Kids, Smoke DZA	Special Edition Grandmaster Deluxe
"Ain't Nothing"	2019	Willie The Kid	Pearls
"It's Possible"	2019	Westside Gunn, Jay Worthy	Hitler Wears Hermes 7
"Ocean Prime"	2019	The Alchemist	Yacht Rock 2
"Friday Night Cypher"	2020	Big Sean, Tee Grizzley, Kash Doll, Cash Kidd, Payroll, 42 Dugg, Drego, Sada Baby, Royce da 5'9", Eminem	Detroit 2
"Get Money"	2020	Dej Loaf, Benny The Butcher, Conway The Machine	Sell Sole II
"Claiborne Kick"	2020	Westside Gunn	Pray For Paris
"Buffs vs. Wires"	2020	Westside Gunn, Benny The Butcher	Flygod Is An Awesome God 2
"All Praises"	2020	Westside Gunn, Jadakiss	Who Made The Sunshine
"Dig It Up"	2020	Real Bad Man, Kool G Rap	On High Alert Volume 3
"Warning Shots"	2020	DJ Muggs	Winter
"Legend of Zelda (Outro)"	2020	LNDN DRGS	Burnout 4
"Voices"	2021	Heem B$F, Chase Fetti	Griselda & BSF: Conflicted (Original Motion Picture Soundtrack)
"Bird Box"	2021	Rx Papi	100 Miles & Walk'in
"TV Dinners"	2021	The Alchemist, Sideshow	This Thing of Ours
"Missing Summers"	2021	Dark Lo & Harry Fraud	Borrowed Time
"All Of That Said"	2021	Evidence	Unlearning Vol. 1
"Stigmata"	2021	Lukah	Why Look Up, God's In the Mirror
"Westheimer"	2021	Westside Gunn, Stove God Cooks, Sauce Walka	Hitler Wears Hermes 8: Sincerely Adolf
"716 Mile"	2021	Westside Gunn	Hitler Wears Hermes 8: Sincerely Adolf
"Nosebleeds"	2021	Bronze Nazareth & Roc Marciano	Ekphrasis
"No Yeast"	2022	Curren$y & The Alchemist	Continuance
"Yzerman"	2022	Nicholas Craven	Craven N3
"Weekends in the Perry's"	2022	Benny The Butcher	Tana Talk 4
"Pot of Gold"	2022	Real Bad Man, The Alchemist, Evidence, Stove God Cooks	On High Alert, Vol. 4
"Sauvage"	2022	Billy Woods, Gabe 'Nandez	Aethiopes
"December Coming"	2022	Domo Genesis & Evidence	Intros, Outros & Interludes
"Looking For Water"	2022	Pink Siifu & Real Bad Man	Real Bad Flights
"Trillion Cuts"	2022	Roc Marciano & The Alchemist	The Elephant Man's Bones
“4Evastackin"	2022	Marcel Allen	Ebony Goddess
"Serving"	2022	Rome Streetz	Kiss the Ring
"Acetone"	2022	Bun B & Statik Selektah	TrillStatik 2
"Big Syke"	2022	The Alchemist, Meyhem Lauren	The Alchemist Sandwich
"Art Talk"	2023	Larry June & The Alchemist	The Great Escape
"Red Dolphin"	2023	A$AP Ant	The PostLude
"Indulgence"	2023	Jabee & Conductor Williams	Am I Good Enough
"Lion Hearted"	2023	Statik Selektah, Elzhi	Round Trip
"Trouble Man"	2023	The Alchemist, T.F.	Flying High EP
"It's On"	2023	DJ Muggs	Soul Assassins 3: Death Valley
"Where We At"	2023	DJ Muggs	Soul Assassins 3: Death Valley
"We Coming for the Safe"	2023	DJ Muggs	Soul Assassins 3: Death Valley
"Stunna"	2023	Rome Streetz, Double Dee	Noise Kandy 5
"Jalen Rose"	2023	Westside Gunn	And Then You Pray For Me
"New Dance Show"	2023	Real Bad Man & YungMorpheus	The Chalice & The Blade
"We Got A Problem Houston"	2023	Bun B & Statik Selektah, Paul Wall	TrillStatik 3
"Live from the Roxy"	2024	Ransom & Harry Fraud	Lavish Misery
"No Fighting"	2024	Elcamino & Real Bad Man	The Game is the Game
"Just Doing Art"	2024	Gangrene, The Alchemist & Oh No	Heads I Win, Tails You Lose
"Godfather, Pt. 2"	2024	Big Hit, Hit-Boy, & The Alchemist	Black & Whites
"Big Piranhas"	2024	Mike Shabb	Sewaside III
"Trigger Warning"	2024	Saint Jame$, Chase Fetti, Rick Hyde	By Any Mean$
"Certified"	2024	Saint Jame$, Hus KingPin, Pink Siifu	By Any Mean$
"Gang Gang"	2024	Saint Jame$, Eto	By Any Mean$
"Mr. Perfect"	2024	Saint Jame$, Elcamino	By Any Mean$
"Classic"	2024	2 Eleven & Python P, Jay Worthy	Proof Of Concept
"Still Praying"	2024	Westside Gunn, DJ Drama, Conway The Machine, Stove God Cooks, Benny The Butcher	Still Praying
"mikealstott"	2024	Blvck Svm	michelinman
"Still Mergin'"	2024	Richard Milli, Willie The Kid	Overseas
"Trillselda 2"	2024	Bun B & Statik Selektah, Conway The Machine, Westside Gunn	TrillStatik 4
"Big Screen Body Slam"	2025	Sxlxmxn, Vic Spencer & Na'ki	Sxlxmxn
"Hansen & Gretel"	2025	Zelooperz & Real Bad Man	Dear Psilocybin
"No Luck"	2025	Jay Exodus & Camoflauge Monk	Art of Expression
"Everything Designer"	2025	Droogie Otis, Your Old Droog & Madlib	Droogie Otis
"Cold Michigan Nights"	2025	Willie The Kid & Real Bad Man	Midnight
"Duffel Bag Hottie's Revenge"	2025	Benny The Butcher	Excelsior
"Choosing Shoes"	2025	Jay Worthy	Once Upon A Time
"Magic"	2025	Elcamino & Black Soprano Family, Double Dee	MINO
"Broke The Bank"	2025	RXKNephew, MVW & ChaseTheMoney	WHOLE LOTTA RXK
"Not Much"	2025	Hit-Boy & The Alchemist	GOLDFISH
"Jamal Crawford"	2025	Marco Plus	MARCO PLUS vs. tha Underworld: Survivor's Cut
"Kenny G"	2025	Valee & MVW	WHERE WERE WE
"Bbq Wings"	2026	Don Cannon & The Cool Kids	Gone Fishing (Extra Credit)
"Tires"	2026	Don Cannon & The Cool Kids	Gone Fishing (Extra Credit)
"Ride Out"	2026	DJ Muggs & T.F	Don't Call Me Lucky
"You Lucky"	2026	Red Cafe	Once In A Red Moon
"Rosie Perez"	2026	Jay Worthy, Taj	Once Upon A Time: The Soundtrack
"On The Spectrum"	2026	The Alchemist	Liquid Form
"Sasquatch"	2026	Gangrene	Better Than McDonald's
