= Super Tecmo Bo =

Studio album by Boldy James & The Alchemist
- Released: December 17, 2021
- Genre: Hip-hop
- Length: 26:06
- Label: ALC
- Producer: The Alchemist

Boldy James & The Alchemist chronology
Bo Jackson (2021)	Super Tecmo Bo (2021)

Boldy James chronology
Bo Jackson (2021)	Super Tecmo Bo (2021)	Killing Nothing (2022)

The Alchemist chronology
This Thing of Ours 2 (2021)	Super Tecmo Bo (2021)	Cycles (2021)

Super Tecmo Bo is the fourth collaborative studio album by American rapper Boldy James and American record producer the Alchemist. It was released on December 17, 2021, through ALC Records. The album serves as a companion project to Bo Jackson, which was released in August of the same year, with some material originating from the same recording sessions.

== Background ==
The album serves as a companion to Bo Jackson, released earlier in 2021, and was released shortly afterward. Its title references former professional football and baseball player Bo Jackson, similarly to its predecessor. The title and artwork also reference the video game Tecmo Super Bowl (1991), with the album's cover depicting Boldy James in the style of the game's cartridge along with Alchemist-related themes.

The album contains nine songs. It features a guest appearance from ICECOLDBISHOP (on "Hot Water Tank"). The first four songs of the album previously appeared on the physical-only deluxe edition of Bo Jackson.

== Critical reception ==
Professional ratings
Review scores
Source	Rating
Beats Per Minute	82%
HipHopDX	3.7/5

Super Tecmo Bo received generally positive reviews from music critics. John Wohlmacher of Beats Per Minute wrote that the album "might be [Boldy James'] second best project" with the Alchemist, praising its "soulful" sampling and calling it "one of [the Alchemist's] best production jobs." Wren Graves of Consequence praised the album for its "knotty flows" layered over "richly textured beats."

On December 18, 2021, "Hot Water Tank" was named as Consequence's "Rap Song of the Week".

== Track listing ==
- All tracks were produced by the Alchemist.

Super Tecmo Bo track listing
No.	Title	Length
1.	"Level Tipping Scales"	1:35
2.	"No Laughing Matter"	2:05
3.	"Hot Water Tank" (featuring ICECOLDBISHOP)	2:58
4.	"Bumps and Bruises"	3:37
5.	"Great Adventures"	1:47
6.	"Moth in the Flame"	4:24
7.	"300 Fences"	2:46
8.	"Guilt"	3:16
9.	"Francois"	3:31
Total length:		26:06
