= The Price of Tea in China =

Studio album by Boldy James & The Alchemist
- Released: February 7, 2020
- Genre: Hip-hop
- Length: 38:44
- Label: ALC Records
- Producer: The Alchemist

Boldy James & The Alchemist chronology
Boldface (2019)	The Price of Tea in China (2020)	Bo Jackson (2021)

Boldy James chronology
Boldface (2019)	The Price of Tea in China (2020)	Manger on McNichols (2020)

the Alchemist chronology
Boldface (2019)	The Price of Tea in China (2020)	Lulu (2020)

Professional ratings
Review scores
Source	Rating
HipHopDX	4.2/5
Pitchfork	8.0/10

The Price of Tea in China is the second studio album by American rapper Boldy James and American DJ and producer the Alchemist. It was released on February 7, 2020 under ALC Records and features guest appearances from Vince Staples, Benny the Butcher, Freddie Gibbs, and Evidence. Production was handled entirely by The Alchemist, making this their third full length collaboration after Boldface EP a year prior. The album received positive reviews and ended up on many publications end of year top albums of 2020 lists.

== Accolades ==
Accolades for The Price of Tea in China
Publication	Accolade	Rank	Ref.
Complex	Complex's 50 Best Albums of 2020	24	
Consequence of Sound	Consequence of Sound's Top 50 Albums of 2020	34	
Rolling Stone	Rolling Stone's 50 Best Albums of 2020	46	
Spin	Spin's 30 Best Albums of 2020 – Mid-Year	—N/a	
Stereogum	Stereogum's 50 Best Albums of 2020	35	
Stereogum	Stereogum's 50 Best Albums of 2020 – Mid-Year	31	

== Track listing ==
The Price of Tea in China track listing
No.	Title	Writer(s)	Length
1.	"Carruth"	Daniel Maman; James Jones III	2:13
2.	"Giant Slide"	Maman; Jones	4:25
3.	"Surf & Turf" (featuring Vince Staples)	Maman; Jones; Vincent Staples	3:43
4.	"Run-Ins"	Maman; Jones	2:29
5.	"Scrape the Bowl" (featuring Benny the Butcher)	Maman; Jones; Jeremie Pennick	3:38
6.	"Pinto"	Maman; Jones	3:17
7.	"Slow Roll"	Maman; Jones	4:10
8.	"S.N.O.R.T." (featuring Freddie Gibbs)	Maman; Jones; Fredrick Tipton	3:11
9.	"Grey October" (featuring Evidence)	Maman; Jones; Michael Perretta	3:38
10.	"Mustard"	Maman; Jones	1:32
11.	"Speed Demon Freestyle"	Maman; Jones	2:37
12.	"Phone Bill"	Maman; Jones	3:51

Notes

- "S.N.O.R.T." features additional vocals by Earl Sweatshirt
- "Giant Slide" features additional vocals by Helios Hussain
