= Music of the United Kingdom (1980s) =

Popular music of the United Kingdom in the 1980s built on the post-punk and new wave movements, incorporating different sources of inspiration from subgenres and what is now classed as world music in the shape of Jamaican and Indian music. It also explored the consequences of new technology and social change in the electronic music of synthpop. In the early years of the decade, while subgenres like heavy metal music continued to develop separately, there was a considerable crossover between rock and more commercial popular music, with a large number of more "serious" bands, like The Police and UB40, enjoying considerable single chart success.

The advent of MTV and cable video helped spur what has been seen as a Second British Invasion in the early years of the decade, with British bands enjoying more success in America than they had since the height of the Beatles' popularity in the 1960s. However, by the end of the decade a fragmentation has been observed, with many new forms of music and sub-cultures, including hip hop and house music, while the single charts were once again dominated by pop artists, now often associated with the Hi-NRG hit factory of Stock Aitken Waterman. The rise of the indie rock scene was partly a response to this, and marked a shift away from the major music labels and towards the importance of local scenes like Madchester and subgenres, like gothic rock.

== Rock ==
=== Post-punk ===
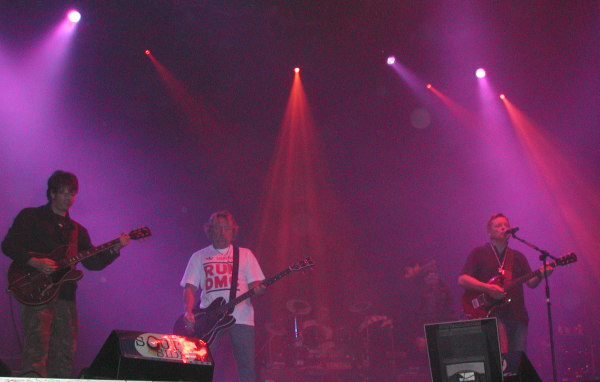
New Order performing live in 2005.

Some of the most successful post punk bands in the 1970s, such as Siouxsie and the Banshees, Echo & the Bunnymen and The Psychedelic Furs, also continued their success during the 1980s. Members of Bauhaus and Joy Division explored new stylistic territory as Love and Rockets and New Order respectively. The second generation of British post-punk bands that broke through in the early 1980s, in, tended to move away from dark sonic landscapes. Some, such as Gang of Four, shifted to a more commercial new wave sound, while others moved into gothic rock or became early examples of indie rock.

=== Gothic rock ===
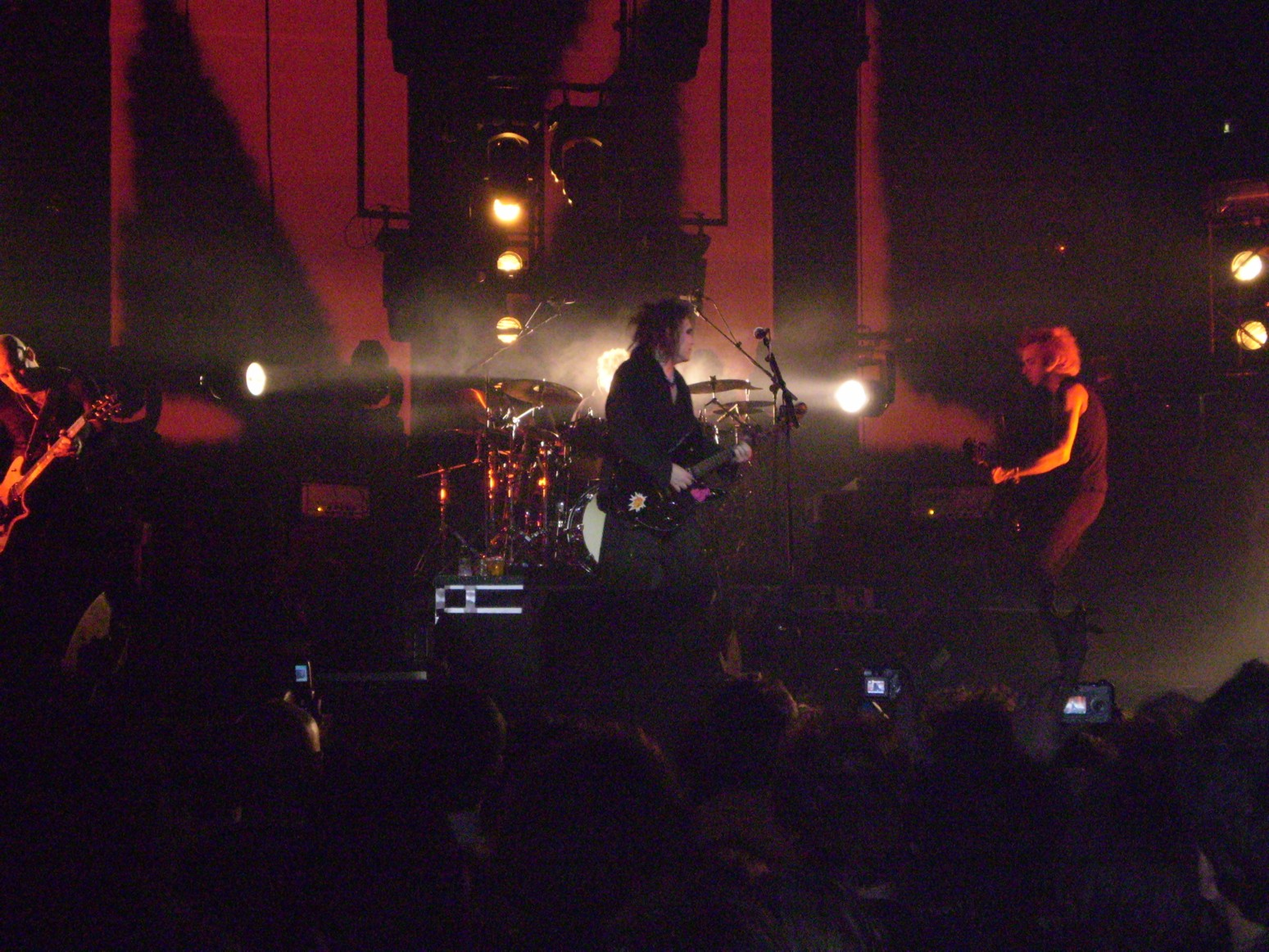
The Cure on stage in 2008.

Gothic rock, often shortened to goth, developed out of the post-punk scene in the early 1980s. It combines dark, often keyboard-heavy music with introspective and depressing lyrics. Notable early gothic rock bands include Bauhaus (whose "Bela Lugosi's Dead" is often cited as the first goth record), Siouxsie and the Banshees (who may have coined the term), The Cure, The Sisters of Mercy, and Fields of the Nephilim. Gothic rock gave rise to a broader goth subculture that included clubs, various fashion trends and numerous publications that grew in popularity in the 1980s, gaining notoriety by being associated by several moral panics over suicide and Satanism.

=== Indie rock ===
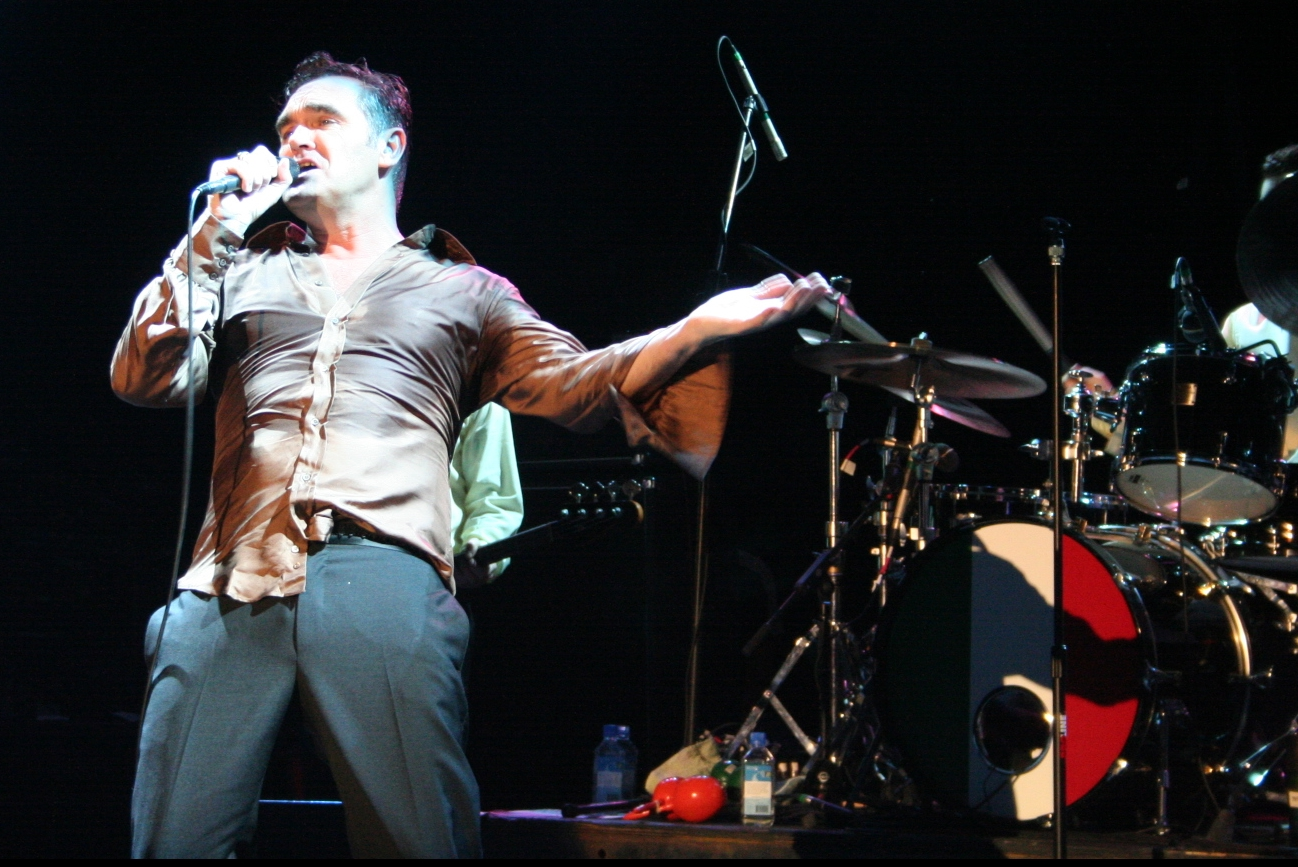
Morrissey of The Smiths performing in 2006.

Indie or independent rock (often described as alternative rock in the U.S.), was a scene that emerged from post-punk and new wave eschewing the major record labels for control of their own music and relying on local scenes or national sub-cultures to provide an audience. Having enjoyed some success a number of indie acts were able to move into the mainstream, including early indie bands Aztec Camera, Orange Juice and The Smiths, followed by The Housemartins and James. The C86 cassette, released in 1986 by NME and featuring such bands as The Wedding Present, Primal Scream, The Pastels, and The Soup Dragons, was a major influence on the development of indie pop and the British indie scene as a whole.

Other forms of alternative rock developed in the UK during the 1980s. The Jesus and Mary Chain wrapped their pop melodies in walls of guitar noise, while New Order emerged from the demise of post-punk band Joy Division and experimented with techno and house music, forging the alternative dance style. The Mary Chain, along with Dinosaur Jr and the dream pop of Cocteau Twins, were the influences for the shoegazing movement of the late 1980s. Named for the bandmembers' tendency to stare at their feet onstage, shoegazing acts like My Bloody Valentine, Slowdive, Ride, and Lush created an overwhelmingly loud "wash of sound" that obscured vocals and melodies with long, droning riffs, distortion, and feedback. Shoegazing bands dominated the British music press at the end of the decade along with the drug-fuelled Madchester scene. Based around The Haçienda, a nightclub in Manchester owned by New Order and Factory Records, Madchester bands such as The Stone Roses and the Happy Mondays mixed acid house dance rhythms with melodic guitar pop.

=== Heavy metal ===
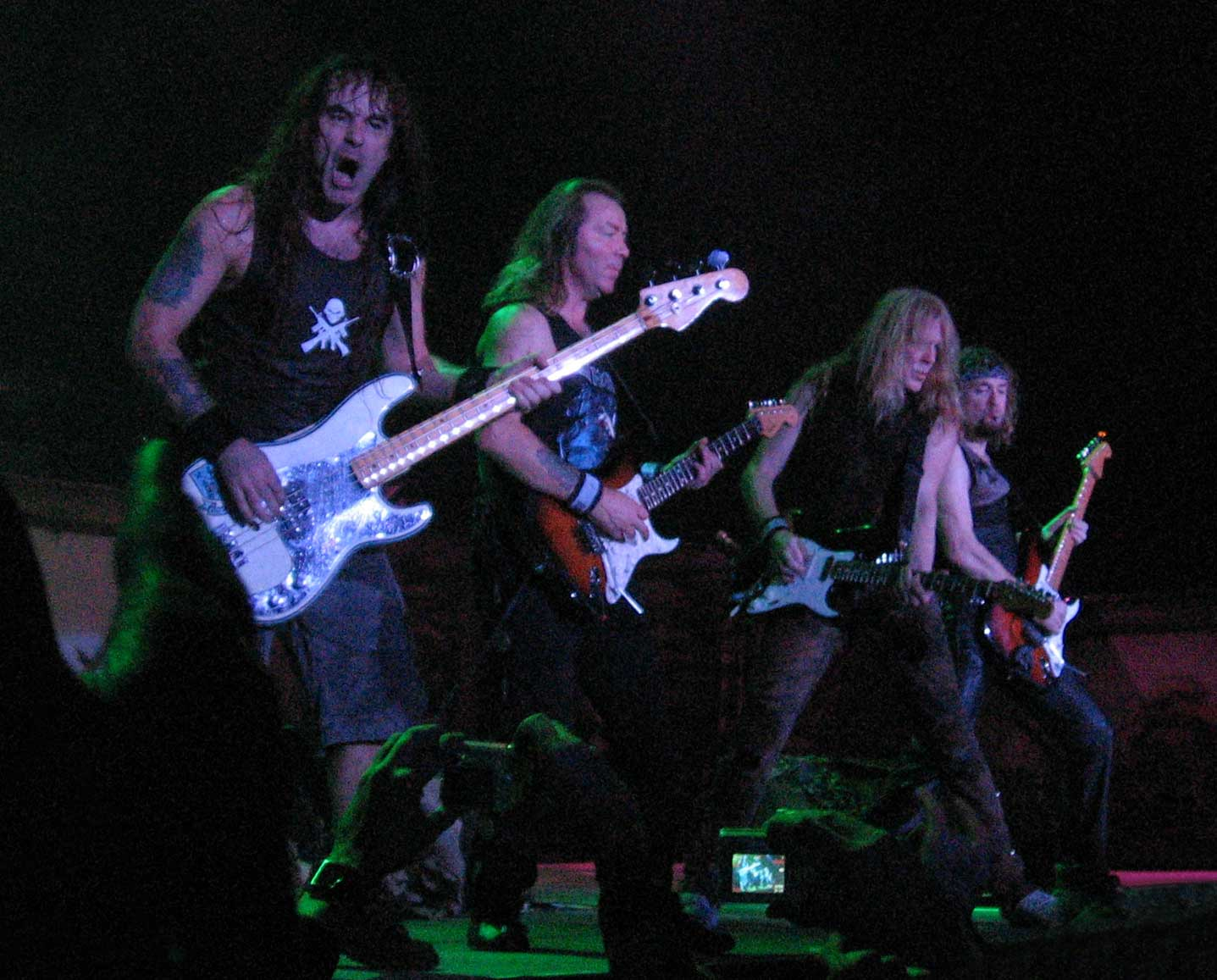
Iron Maiden, one of the central bands in the new wave of British heavy metal

In the 1980s, the new wave of British heavy metal broke into the mainstream, as albums by Judas Priest, Iron Maiden, Saxon reached the British top 10. Many metal artists, including Def Leppard, benefited from the exposure they received on MTV and became the inspiration for American glam metal. However, as the subgenre fragmented into various subgenres, much of the creative impetus shifted towards America and continental Europe (particularly Germany and Scandinavia), which produced most of the major new subgenres of metal, which were then taken up by British acts. These included thrash metal and death metal, both developed in the US; black metal and power metal, both developed in continental Europe, but influenced by the British band Venom; and doom, which was developed in the US, but which soon were adopted by a number of bands from England, including Pagan Altar and Witchfinder General.

=== Grindcore ===
Grindcore, or simply grind, emerged during the mid-1980s as an extreme music genre characterised by heavily distorted, down-tuned guitars, high speed tempo, blast beats, songs often lasting no more than two minutes (some are seconds long), and vocals which consist of growls and high-pitched screams. It drew inspiration from some of the most abrasive music genres – including death metal, industrial music, noise and the more extreme varieties of hardcore punk. Grindcore, as such, was developed during the mid-1980s in the United Kingdom by Napalm Death, a group who emerged from the crust punk scene. Napalm Death inspired other British grindcore groups in the 1980s, among them Extreme Noise Terror, Carcass and Sore Throat.

=== Folk punk ===
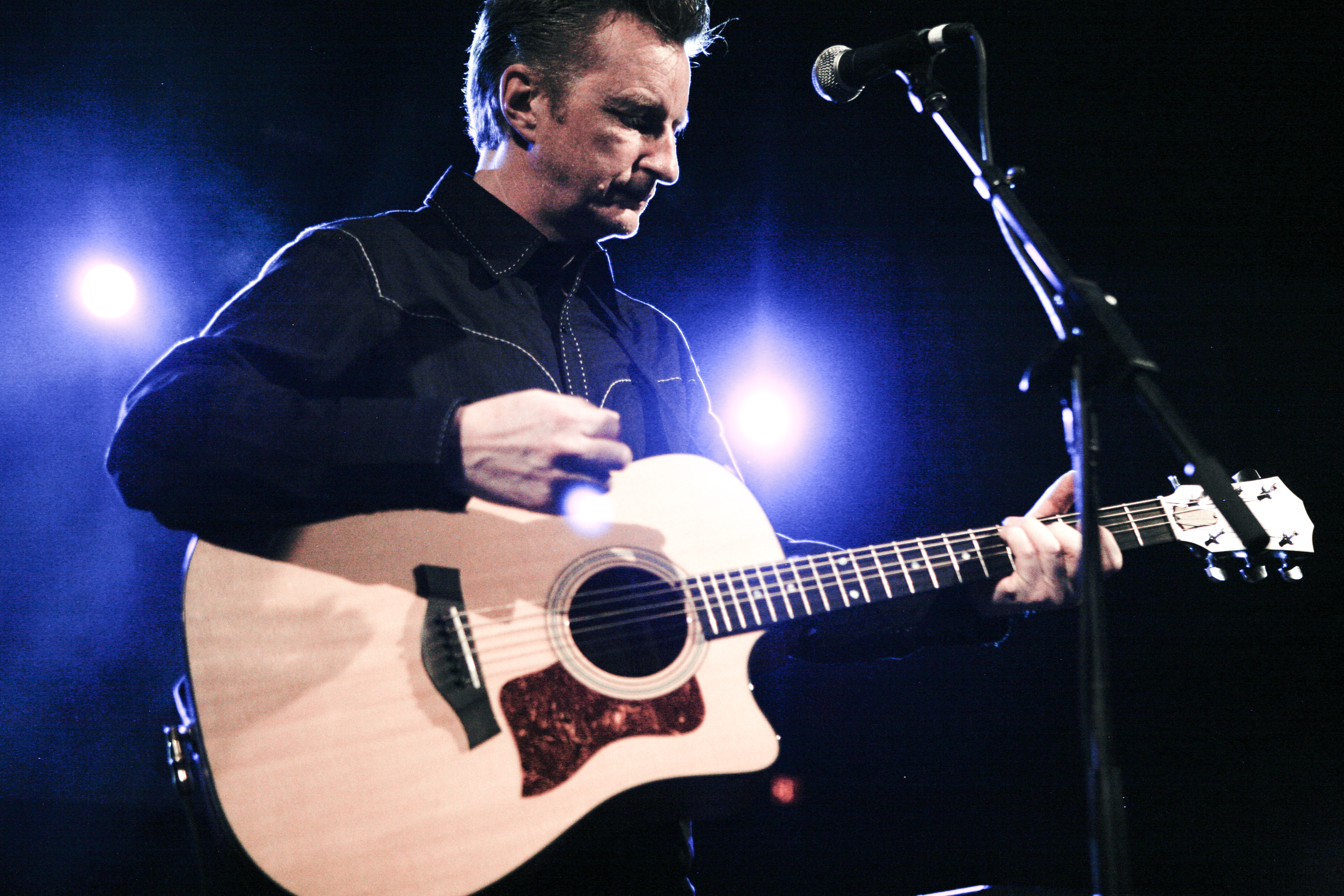
Billy Bragg performing at South by Southwest in 2008.

Folk punk or rogue folk is a fusion of folk music and punk rock, or occasionally other genres, which was pioneered by the London-based Irish band The Pogues in the 1980s. It achieved some mainstream success in the 1980s and, particularly as the subgenre of Celtic punk, has been widely adopted in areas of the Celtic diaspora in North America and Australia and by many bands in continental central and eastern Europe. Unlike earlier Celtic rock and electric folk groups, folk punk groups tend to include relatively little traditional music in their repertoire, but instead usually performed their own compositions, often following the form of punk rock, using additional folk instrumentation, including, mandolin, accordion, banjo and particularly violin. Other bands adopted some traditional forms of music, including sea shanties and eastern European gypsy music. Among the most successful performers were The Levellers, and singer-songwriter Billy Bragg, who enjoyed a series of hits in the 1980s.

== Pop ==
The British charts at the opening of the 1980s contained the usual mix of imports, novelty acts, oddities (including rock 'n' roll revivalist Shakin' Stevens) and survivors like Queen and David Bowie, but were dominated by post punk, and then from about 1981 by new romantic acts. There were also more conventional pop acts, including Bucks Fizz, whose light lyrics and simple tempos gave them three number ones after their Eurovision Song Contest victory in 1981.

The dance-pop music of Frankie Goes to Hollywood, initially controversial, gave them three consecutive number ones in 1984, until they faded away in the mid-1980s. Perhaps the most successful British pop band of the era were the duo Wham! with an unusual mix of disco, soul, ballads and even rap, who had eleven top ten hits in the UK, six of them number ones, between 1982 and 1986. Another band that dominated the charts in the early to mid-1980s were Culture Club, who had nine top ten hits and two number ones, including the best-selling single of 1983 with "Karma Chameleon", before splitting up in 1986. In the second half of the 1980s, British pop music was dominated by Stock Aitken Waterman's "hit factory" with the uniformity of their Hi-NRG sound.

=== New Romantics ===
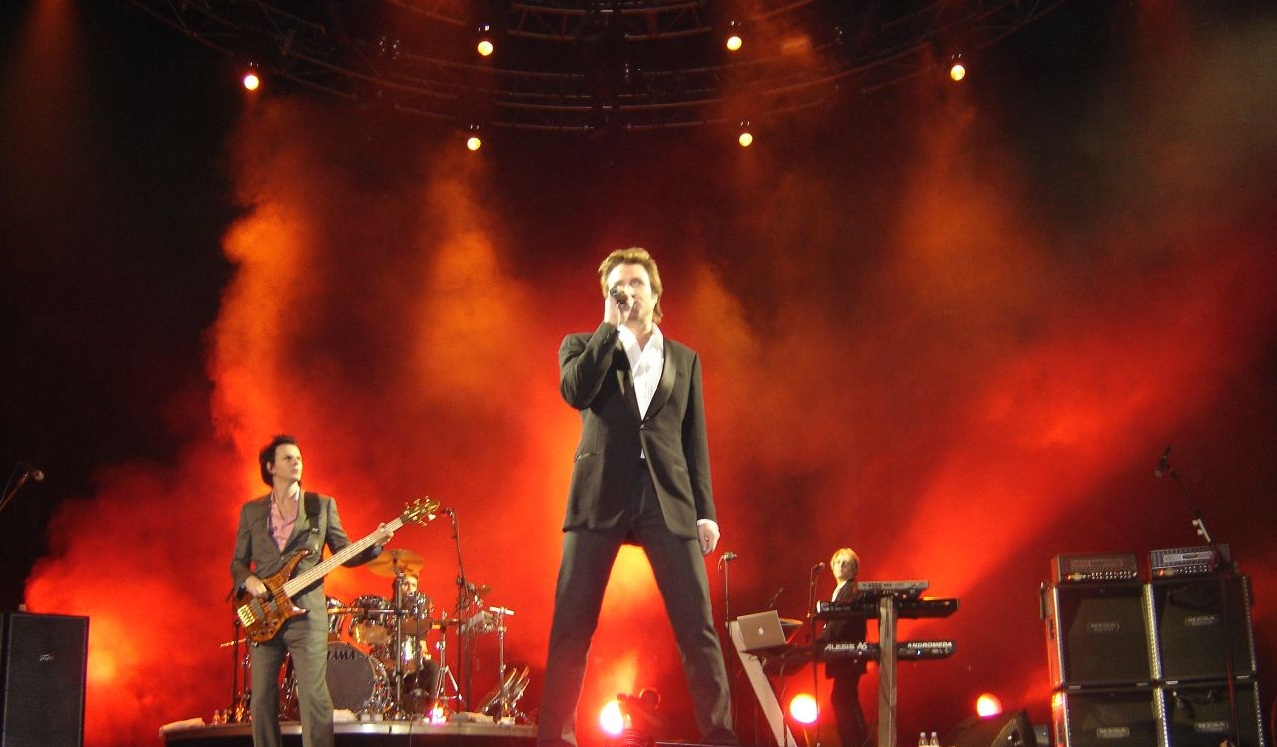
Duran Duran on stage in 2005.

New Romantic music emerged in London nightclubs including Billy's and the Blitz Club towards the end of the 1970s. Influenced by David Bowie and Roxy Music, it developed glam rock fashions, gaining its name from the frilly fop shirts of early Romanticism. New Romantic music often made extensive use of synthesisers. Pioneers included Visage and Ultravox and among the commercially most successful acts associated with the movement were Adam and the Ants, Culture Club, Spandau Ballet and Duran Duran. By about 1983 the original movement had dissolved, with surviving acts dropping most of the fashion elements to pursue mainstream careers.

=== Synth-pop ===
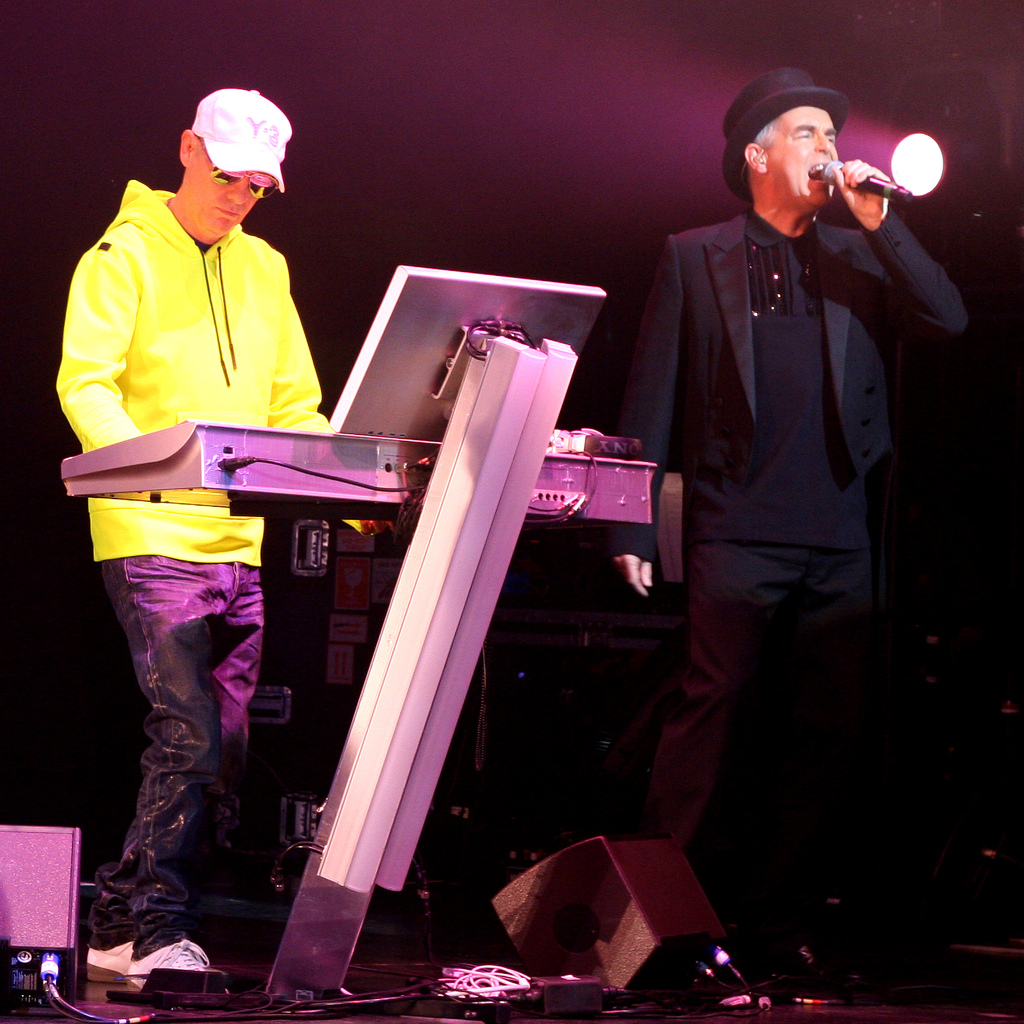
Pet Shop Boys.

Synth-pop emerged from post-punk and new wave in the late 1970s, producing a form of pop music that followed electronic rock pioneers in the 1960s and 1970s like Kraftwerk, Jean-Michel Jarre and Tangerine Dream, in which the synthesiser is the dominant musical instrument. Tubeway Army, a little known outfit from West London, dropped their punk rock image and topped the UK charts in 1979 with the single "Are "Friends" Electric?", prompting their singer, Gary Numan to go solo and release the album, The Pleasure Principle from which he gained a number one in the singles charts with "Cars".

Trevor Horn of the Buggles captured the changing scene in the international hit "Video Killed the Radio Star". It also became dominant for many New Romantic acts like Visage, Ultravox, Duran Duran and Japan. There were also more straight forwardly electropop acts like the Human League as well as Depeche Mode, Soft Cell, Blancmange, Heaven 17, OMD, and Yazoo. Other key artists from the early to mid-1980s include Eurythmics, Talk Talk, A Flock of Seagulls, Tears for Fears, New Order, Pet Shop Boys, Thomas Dolby, Thompson Twins, Bronski Beat, Howard Jones, and Erasure.

=== Hi-NRG ===
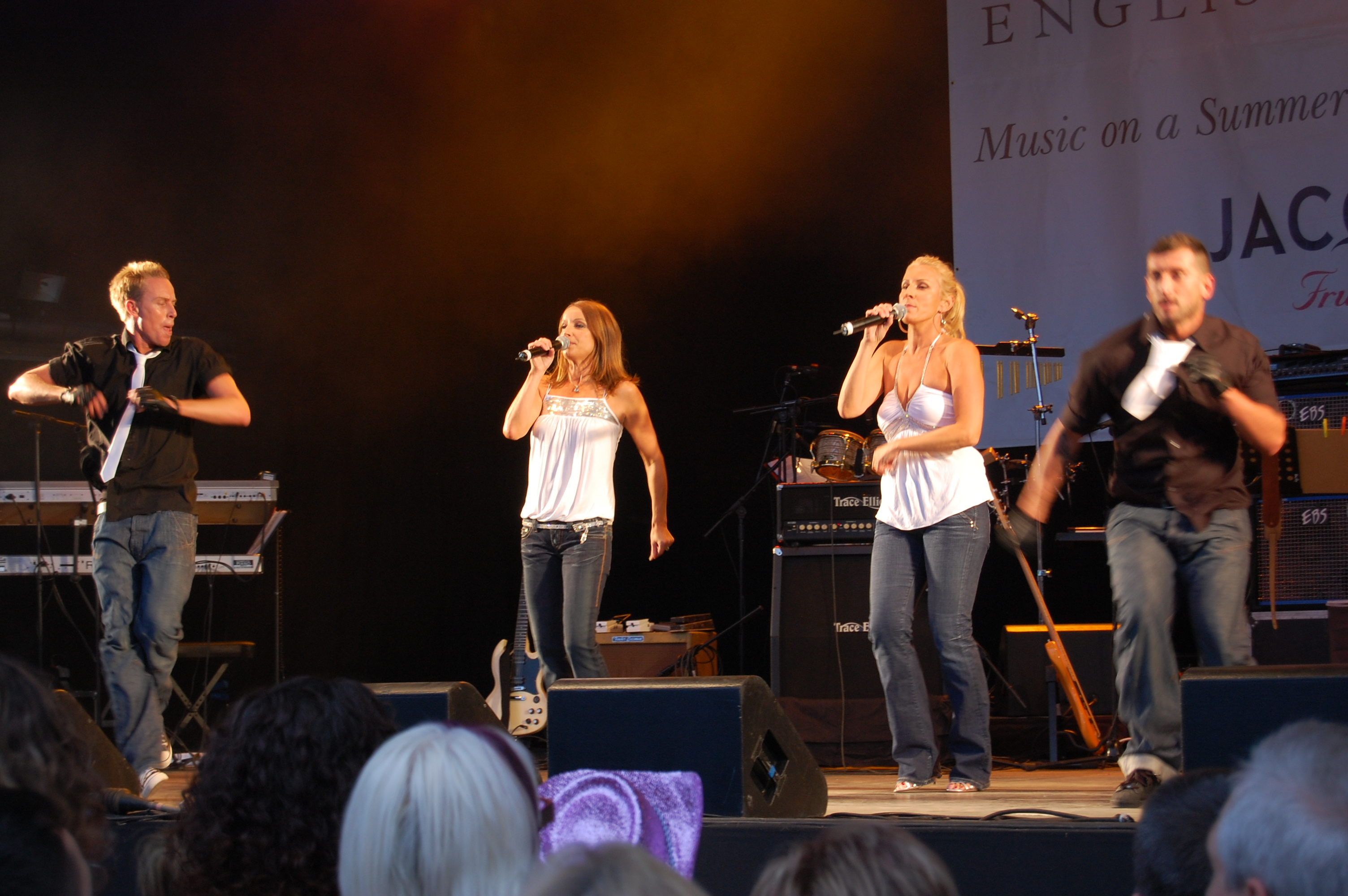
The reformed Bananarama on stage in 2007.

Hi-NRG ("high energy") is high-tempo disco music (often with electronic instrumentation), as well as a more specific, derivative genre of electronic dance music that achieved mainstream popularity in the mid to late 1980s. In the early 1980s hi energy disco had become popular in the gay scene of American cities like New York and San Francisco with acts like Divine, and The Weather Girls. In 1983 in the UK, music magazine Record Mirror championed the gay underground sound and began publishing a weekly Hi-NRG Chart.

Hi-NRG also entered the mainstream with hits in the UK singles chart, such as Hazell Dean's "Searchin' (I Gotta Find a Man)" and Evelyn Thomas's "High Energy". In the mid-1980s, Hi-NRG producers in the dance and the main singles charts included Ian Levine and trio Stock Aitken Waterman, both of whom worked with many different artists. Stock Aitken Waterman had three of the most successful Hi-NRG singles ever with their productions of Dead or Alive's "You Spin Me Round (Like a Record)" (UK No. 1 & US No. 11 in 1985), Bananarama's "Venus" (US No. 1 & UK No. 8 in 1986), and Rick Astley's "Never Gonna Give You Up" (UK No. 1 & US No. 1 in 1987). Their artists dominated British pop music and the charts in the late 1980s, including Bananarama, Rick Astley and Australian actress Kylie Minogue.

== UK soul ==
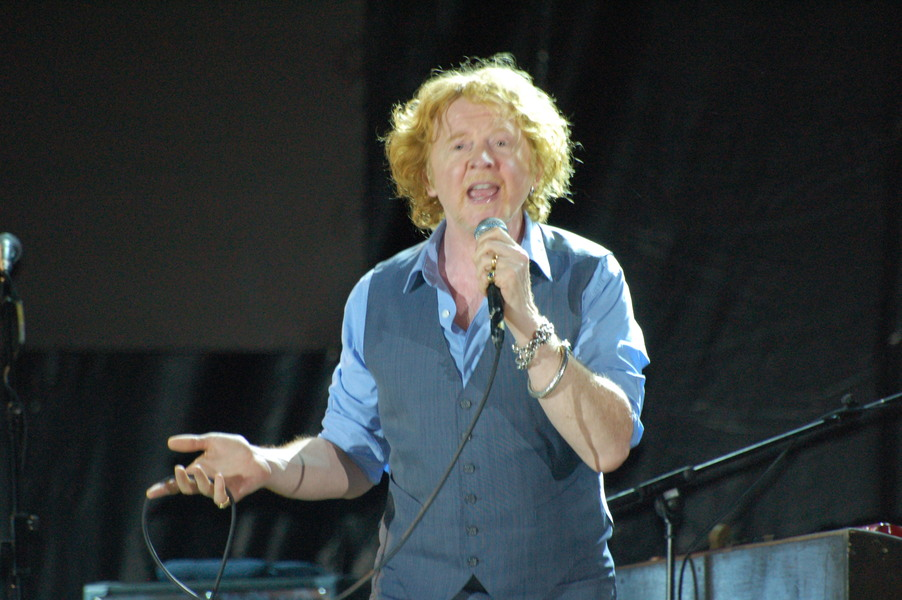
Mick Hucknall of Simply Red, 2009

In 1980s, UK soul musicians such as Junior, Princess, the Pasadenas, Mica Paris, Soul II Soul, and Central Line played soul music and had hit songs. Soul II Soul's breakthrough R&B hits "Keep on Movin'" and "Back to Life" in 1989 have been seen as opening the door to the mainstream for black British soul and R&B performers.

Britain had produced some blue-eyed soul singers in the 1960s, including Tom Jones and Dusty Springfield and interest had been maintained by figures such as David Bowie, but it was not until the 1980s that a clear genre of British soul music developed with flourishing soul scenes in major cities like London and Manchester, often with many black artists, supported by local and pirate radio stations. This interest was reflected in a series of covers or songs inspired by soul for a number of major acts, including Phil Collins's "You Can't Hurry Love" (1982), Culture Club's "Church of the Poison Mind" (1983), The Style Council's "Shout to the Top", (1984) Eurythmics' "Missionary Man" (1986), and Steve Winwood "Roll with It" (1988).

For the first time since the 1960s, there were also significant acts who specialised in soul. Former Wham! singer George Michael released the multi-platinum Faith album (1987). Also significant were Sade, Swing Out Sister, Simply Red and toward the end of the decade, Lisa Stansfield. In the twenty-first century, bloggers and journalists have decided to categorise Sade and many of these blue-eyed soul singers/white soul acts under new definitions such as the 'New Wave of British Jazz Pop' and 'sophisti-pop', though with the latter term some journalists have also included artists such as Kate Bush, ABC and Talk Talk, with the 'sophistication' coming from techniques used in the studio rather than a sophisticated jazz-pop/white soul sound.

== Hip hop ==
Tim Westwood, one of the most important DJs to promote hip hop in Britain.

A British hip hop scene emerged in the early 1980s, largely based on American hip hop music at parties and club nights, In this period some pop records dabbled with rap – such as Adam and the Ants' "Ant Rap" (1981), Wham!'s "Wham Rap! (Enjoy What You Do)" (1982) and Malcolm McLaren's "Buffalo Gals" (1982). More serious British artists were rapping live or recording amateur tapes in the early 1980s, but the first British hip hop tune released on record was "London Bridge" by Newtrament in 1984.

Over the next few years, more UK hip hop and electro was released: Street Sounds Electro UK (1984), which was produced by Greg Wilson and featured an early appearance from MC Kermit, who later went on to form the Wilson produced Ruthless Rap Assassins; The Rapologists' "Kids Rap/Party Rap" (1984), but releases and national publicity were still rare. Mainstream radio did play British hip hop on occasion, and instrumental in giving the scene wider recognition were DJs such as Dave Pearce, Tim Westwood, and John Peel, but in this period it made very little impact on the mainstream charts. The scene remained predominantly underground depending on word of mouth and the patronage of pirate radio stations. The first UK record label devoted to releasing UK hip hop acts was Simon Harris' Music of Life label, founded in 1986. It was home to Derek B, the first UK rapper to achieve chart success. Music of Life went on to sign groups such as Hijack, the Demon Boyz, Hardnoise (later Son of Noise) and MC Duke.

Other acts and styles developed from the hip hop scene, resulting in new genres to describe them – for example Massive Attack with trip hop, or Galliano with acid jazz. Hip Hop Connection, the first major British hip hop magazine, was founded in 1989 and by the early 1990s the British hip hop scene seemed to be thriving. Not only was there a firm base of rappers in London – such as Black Radical Mk II and Overlord X – but many distinct scenes developed nationally.

== Electronic music ==
In the 1980s, dance music records made using only electronic instruments became increasingly popular, largely influenced from the electronic music of Kraftwerk and disco music. Such music was originally born of and popularised via regional nightclub scenes in the 1980s, and became the predominant type of music played in discothèques as well as the rave scene.

=== House music ===
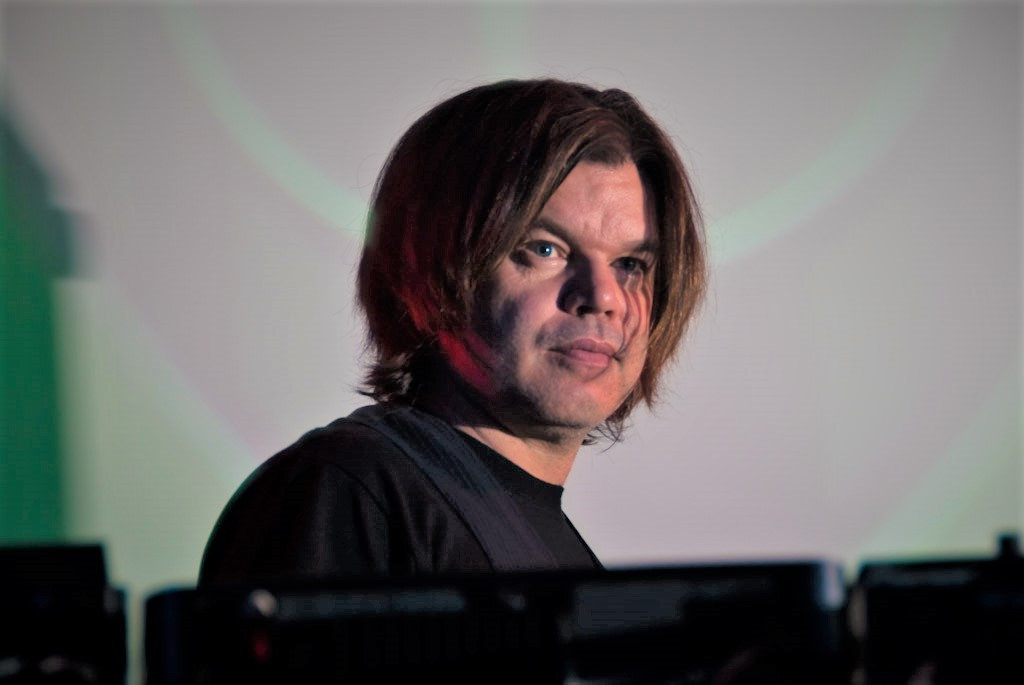
Paul Oakenfold

House music was a style of electronic dance music that originated in Chicago, Illinois, US, in the early 1980s. House music was strongly influenced by elements of soul and funk-infused varieties of disco. House music generally mimics disco's percussion, especially the use of a prominent bass drum on every beat, but may feature a prominent synthesiser bassline, electronic drums, electronic effects, funk and pop samples, and reverb or delay-enhanced vocals. In the early 1980s, a UK house scene developed in cities such as London, Birmingham and Manchester, particularly at The Haçienda Club and on the holiday island of Ibiza.

One of the earliest and most influential UK house and techno record labels was Network Records (otherwise known as Kool Kat records) who helped introduce Italian and U.S. dance music to Britain as well as promoting select UK dance music acts. The first English house tune, "Carino" by T-Coy was released in 1986. By late 1987, DJs like Paul Oakenfold and Danny Rampling were bringing the Ibiza sound to UK clubs like Shoom in Southwark (London), Heaven, Future, Spectrum and Purple Raines in Birmingham. The genre became more well known to the general public when it began to crossover into the mainstream singles chart around 1986, with the song "Love Can't Turn Around" by Farley "Jackmaster" Funk (featuring Darryl Pandy) generally being accredited as the first record to crossover from clubs to charts when it became a top 10 hit that year. Another major milestone for house music was when "Jack Your Body" by American DJ Steve "Silk" Hurley became the first record from the genre to reach the number one spot in the UK Singles Chart in January 1987.

== Jazz fusion ==
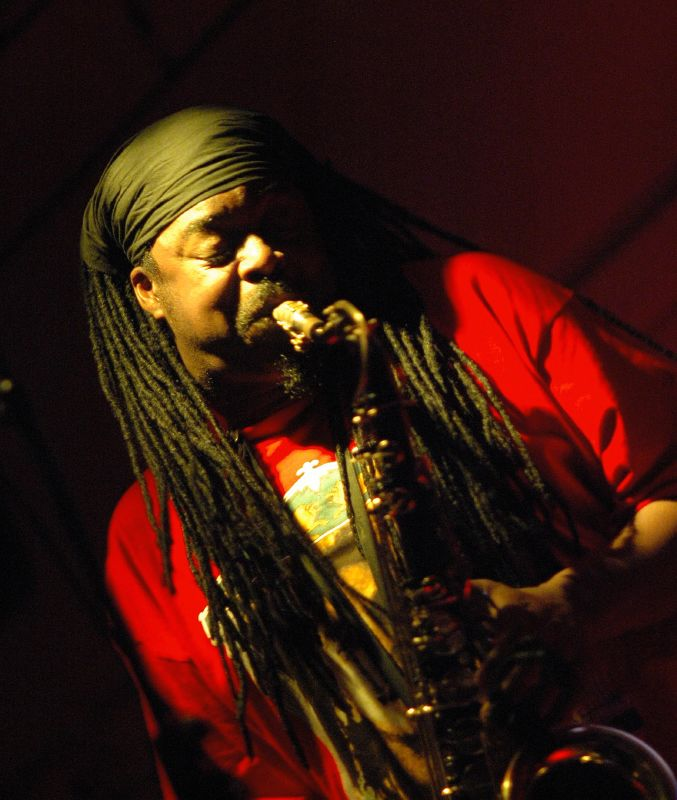
Courtney Pine performing in 2006.

After the lean years of the 1970s, there was something of a British jazz revival based in London's Soho in the 1980s. Initially this UK jazz dance scene was led by DJs like Paul Murphy, but it soon expanded to support live bands and to start its own record labels. The jazz revival was by the appearance of a new generation of British jazz and fusion musicians, including members of the jazz groups Level 42, Incognito, Jazz Warriors (formed 1986), Courtney Pine, Gary Crosby, and later Soweto Kinch. The Acid Jazz label was formed in 1987, producing a mix of hip hop and funk beat flavoured jazz stylings that put traditional jazz elements over modern beats.

== 2 Tone and reggae ==
Having emerged from the post-punk and reggae scenes in the West Midlands in the 1970s, the ska revival associated with 2 Tone records was a remarkable commercial success in the early years of the 1980s. Bands like The Specials, The Selecter, The Beat, Madness, Bad Manners and The Bodysnatchers all enjoyed chart success, with Madness and The Specials managing number ones. The Specials' "Ghost Town" (1981) is often seen as summarising the disillusionment of Thatcherite, post-industrial urban youth.

Madness managed to sustain a career that could still chart into the second half of the 1980s as they began to merge into the pop and new wave genres, having more time in the UK Singles Chart than any other band of the eighties. However, the 2-tone movement faded early in the decade, and would have a longer term effect through American bands of the third wave of ska. The more reggae based music of UB40 allowed them to continue to chart into the twentieth century, enjoying four number ones in the UK, the last of these in 1994. In the late 1980s, London also developed an early dancehall scene, as documented by the compilation album Watch How the People Dancing: Unity Sounds from the London Dancehall 1986–1989.

== Indian music in the UK ==
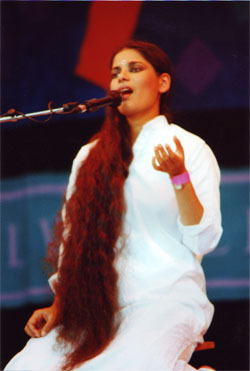
Sheila Chandra on stage.

By the mid-1970s, the demand among the relatively large Asian populations of many major British cities for familiar live music to entertain at weddings and other cultural occasions led to a flourishing Asian dance band scene, particularly bhangra from the Punjab which supported bands like Alaap, formed in Southall in London and Bhujhungy Group from Birmingham.

Alaap's 1979 album Teri Chunni de Sitare for Multitone records, mixed traditional dhol and tumbi with synthesisers and electro beats and was a surprise hit to those outside of the scene. It opened the door for a flood of Asian recording artists in the UK including Apna Sangeet, Chirag Pehchan, Sangeeta and DCS.

By the mid-1980s, bhangra was the most popular music among British Asians and a youth scene of daytime bhangra raves were a major part of a growing youth culture. Multitone Records began to release remix albums, and bhangra picked up influences from hip hop and soul, producing groups like X-executive Sounds and Hustlers convention.

Other 1980s forms of British Indian music included the punk rock and rap of Aki Nawaz, the pop of Sheila Chandra, the hip hop of Joi Bangla and Osmani Sounds, and the ghazal/jazz fusion of Najma Akhtar. The decade also saw the first record with clear South Asian influences since the 1960s to enter the British charts, when Monsoon's "Ever So Lonely" reached the top ten.

== Second British Invasion ==
The Second British Invasion consisted of acts that came mainly out of synthpop and the New Pop movement, often called "New Music" in the US. These acts received exposure in the United States on the cable music channel MTV which launched in 1981. British artists, unlike many of their American counterparts, had learned how to use the music video early on. Several British acts signed to independent labels were able to outmarket and outsell American artists that were signed with major labels.

With considerable boost from MTV airplay during July 1982, The Human League's "Don't You Want Me" had a three-week reign on top of the Billboard 100 chart, described by The Village Voice as the moment the Second British Invasion kicked off. They were followed by bands like Duran Duran, whose glossy videos would come to symbolise the power of MTV. On MTV, British bands were introduced to the American mainstream that probably would not have gained the publicity otherwise. The first band to owe their American success solely down to their glossy music video receiving heavy rotation on MTV were the synthpop band A Flock of Seagulls, whose single "I Ran (So Far Away)" reached No. 9 on the Billboard Hot 100 in the summer of 1982. In 1983, 30% of the record sales were from British acts. Eighteen of the top 40 and six of the top 10 singles on 18 July were by British artists. Overall record sales rose by 10% from 1982.

Newsweek magazine featured Annie Lennox and Boy George on the cover of one of its issues while Rolling Stone would release an England Swings issue. In April 1984, 40 of the top 100 singles were from British acts while 8 of the top 10 singles in a May 1985 survey were of British origin. In 1984, a majority of acts that signed to independent labels such as The Smiths were mining various rock influences becoming an alternative to the Second Invasion. MTV continued its heavy rotation of videos by Second Invasion acts until 1987.

== See also ==
- 1980s in music
