= Solid n Mind =

- Genres: Hip hop, Britcore
- Years active: 1989–1994, 2009–present
- Labels: Liberty Grooves, Tru-Tone Records
- Members: Whirlwind D, Johnny F (1989–1994); Whirlwind D, Johnny F, Assembly Worker (2009–present)
- Past members: MSD

Solid n Mind (formerly Solid State) were a British hip hop group that formed in 1989. The group was composed of Whirlwind D (Dudley Jaynes) and Johnny F.

== Biography ==
Previously, Johnny F had hosted radio shows and was a record dealer, whilst Whirlwind D had been working with the fledgling Kold Sweat Records label. In Spring 1990, having recorded a couple of tracks ("An Original Break" and "Centre Stage"), the Liberty Grooves label was conceived. Reaching number 3 in the Tower Records Dance Chart in December 1990, "An Original Break" would mark the beginning of Liberty Grooves.

"An Original Break" sampled "Big Beat" and "Rupert The Bear" amongst other things in order to take a sarcastic look at the lack of originality in sampling at the time. In contrast to this, their follow-up ("Centre Stage") opted for harder samples and battle rhymes. "Centre Stage", which was to be backed with "Woke with Nothin'", was due to be released as LIB003. However owing to geographical differences, other than a cassette sampler, the record did not receive an official release until 2009 and the relaunch of Liberty Grooves.

"Centre Stage" would become the group's best known track in the early 90s and was regularly featured in shows and freestyles in London (such as at the Liberty Grooves New Years Jam alongside MC Mell O, Braintax, Def Tex and Lil Rodney Cee of Funky Four Plus One fame) and on the South Coast at venues such as The Brook. In addition, the track was recently featured on The Crown Jewels Part 2 CD by Aroe and the Soundmakers, in its 1990 demo format.

Before the release of the Trials Of Life EP by the Gutter Snypes on the imprint, Johnny F spent much of his time running Liberty Grooves - The Hip Hop Shop in Tooting. At the same time, Whirlwind was living on the South Coast. Despite this, the duo wrote another track, "Battle Tipped Rhyme", which although never ready for release, was performed on a number of occasions. This track was rebuilt by The Assembly Worker and Whirlwind D, and finally released in 2010 to mark 20 years of the Liberty Grooves record label. Whirlwind D continues to record and perform, using the Solid n Mind name in the present day. He now records with Tru-Tone Records and released the WD40 EP in 2012.

== Discography ==
- "An Original Break" (Liberty Grooves, 1990)
- "Centre Stage"/"Woke with Nothin'" (Liberty Grooves, 1991)
- "Battle Tipped Rhyme" (Liberty Grooves, 1992)
- WD40 EP (Tru-Tone Records, 2012) - as Whirlwind D

== Appearances ==
- "Makes Me Smile" (Undercover Cuts 18, 2004)
- "Centre Stage" (1990 version) (Aroe And The Soundmakers - Crown Jewels Part 2, 2008)
- "Battle Tipped" (Rhyme Remix) (Underground United Volume 2, 2011)
