= RUF =

Ruf or RUF may refer to:

- Charles Francis Ruf (1905-1985), American actor better known as Frank Faylen
- Nadine Ruf (born 1978), German politician
- Ruf Automobile, a German automobile manufacturer
- Ruf Beats, a British hip hop record label
- Ruf Records, a German blues record label
- Reformed University Fellowship, a Christian campus ministry of the Presbyterian Church in America
- RNA of unknown function
- Revolutionary United Front of Sierra Leone
- Darin Ruf (born 1986), American baseball player
- Wolfgang Ruf (born 1941), German musicologist
- Rapid Urban Flexible, dual-mode transit system
- Ruf, a Japanese eroge studio, notably the developers for Yume Miru Kusuri
