= Angelo Starr =

American singer

- Born: Cleveland, Ohio, United States
- Instrument(s): Guitar, vocals
- Labels: Centre City Records

Angelo Starr is an American singer, musician and record producer. He is also the younger brother of the late soul singer Edwin Starr.

== Background ==
Angelo Starr was born in Cleveland, Ohio. His time as a youth was spent in Cleveland as well as Detroit, Michigan, where he would go to see his brother Edwin during the summer school breaks. The reason Starr came to the UK was because of his brother.

One of the fields Starr had worked in is as an audio engineer with the UK hip hop label Kold Sweat Records.

=== The Team ===
The Team was Edwin Starr's touring band. It was formed in 1982 by percussionist Clive Hare and bass player Kevin Kendall. Angelo Starr's first involvement with the group came about during the 1990s when he took the place on a show filling in for their absent guitarist. He carried on doing work for them and served as their musical director. Upon the death of his brother in 2003, he felt he had reached an impasse and did not know if he still wanted to be involved with music. He eventually stepped in to front his brother's touring band The Team which had been around for years. They played at various venues such as the Riverbank Bar & Kitchen, which was part of their concert tour with their end concert in Great Yarmouth in November 2017.

=== Other music involvement ===
Starr also contributes as a singer in The AllStars Collective.

== Discography ==
Singles
Title	Release info	Year	F	Notes
"Stand On My Own Two Feet" / "Non Stop Destination"	Centre City Records CENC 001	2007	7" 45	

Various artist compilation appearances
Title	Release info	Year	Track(s)	F	Notes
Northern Soul 2007	Centre City Records CENCCD001	2007	"Stand On My Own Two Feet" "Non Stop Destination"	CD + DVD	
Disco 2008	Centre City Records CENCCD002	2007	"There's A Storm Coming On"	CD	
Yesterday And Tomorrow	Centre City Records CENCCD003	2008	"Baby I'm Still The Same Man"	CD	
Northern Soul 2008	Centre City Records CENCCD004	2008	"Don't Leave Me Stranded"	CD	Starr also does backing vocals for "You Threw A Lucky Punch" by Fay Jones
Reaching For The Very Best	Goldsoul GOLDENCD009; Centre City Records GOLDENCD009	2008	"Stand On My Own Two Feet"	CD	
Northern Soul 2009	Centre City Records CENCCD007; Wienerworld WNRCD5050	2009	"Back In The Middle Of A Broken Heart"	CD + DVD	
Northern Soul 2010	Centre City Records CENCCD009; Wienerworld WNRCD5056	2010	"Let Me Be The Guy"	CD	Starr also does backing vocals for "Lost In The Wind" by Fay Jones
Northern Soul 2011	Centre City Records CENCCD011; Wienerworld WNRCD5066	2012	"Conquer The World"	CD	
Northern Soul 2012	Centre City Records CENCCD012; Wienerworld WNRCD5067	2012	"Checking My Mailbox"	CD	
