= UK rap =

British genre of hip-hop

- Other names: British hip-hop; British rap; Brit-hop; UK hip-hop
- Stylistic origins: Hip-hop; R&B/hip-hop; garage house; dub
- Cultural origins: Early 1980s, United Kingdom
- Derivative forms: Trip hop

Subgenres
- Britcore (British hardcore hip-hop); road rap; UK drill; UK underground

Other topics
- Drum and bass; grime; dubstep; UK garage; gangsta rap; UK drill; drill; trap; hip-hop; R&B; afroswing

UK rap, also known as British hip-hop or UK hip-hop or British rap, is a music genre and culture that covers a variety of styles of hip-hop made in the United Kingdom. The development of UK rap was shaped by a distinct set of regional influences, slang, and grassroots movements that differentiated it from American hip-hop. It is generally classified as one of a number of styles of R&B/hip-hop.

British hip-hop can also be referred to as Brit-hop, a term coined and popularised mainly by British Vogue magazine and the BBC. British hip-hop was originally influenced by the dub/toasting introduced to the United Kingdom by Jamaican migrants in the 1950s–70s, who eventually developed uniquely influenced rapping (or speed-toasting) to match the rhythm of the ever-increasing pace and aggression of Jamaican-influenced dub in the UK.

Toasting and soundsystem cultures were also influential in genres outside of hip-hop that still included rapping – such as grime, jungle, and UK garage.

In 2003, The Times described British hip-hop's broad-ranging approach:

..."UK hip-hop" is a broad sonic church, encompassing anything made in Britain by musicians informed or inspired by hip-hop's possibilities, whose music is a response to the same stimuli that gave birth to rap in New York in the mid-Seventies.

Although the underground scene was well established by the late 1980s, UK rap music saw little commercial success for several decades. Outside of a few exceptions such as Derek B and later the birth of trip-hop, from the 1980s until the early 2010s UK rap made up a small percentage of album sales in the domestic market. Performers saw wider success in the 2020s, including Stormzy headlining Glastonbury Festival, Dave releasing back-to-back UK number one albums with Psychodrama followed by We're All Alone in This Together, and Little Simz winning the Mercury Prize.

== History ==
=== Origins ===
As in the US, British hip-hop emerged as a scene from graffiti and breakdancing, and then through to DJing and rapping live at parties and club nights, with its supporters predominantly listening to and influenced by US hip-hop. Unlike in the US, the British hip-hop scene was cross-racial from the beginning, as diverse ethnic groups in Britain tend not to live in segregated areas, even in areas with a high percentage of non-white individuals. Such places allow youth to share culture with one another, including musical genres such as hip-hop.

Cross pollination through migrating West Indians helped develop a community interested in the music. The integration of sound systems represent a distinct British Caribbean influence. Sound systems allowed for powerful syncopated bass runs and the ability to bring this sound to other venues creating a club culture. There were, however, British tunes starting to appear. There are an abundance of records that are often credited with being the first British hip-hop release, "Christmas Rapping" by Dizzy Heights (Polydor, 1982), is often credited as such, as well as the slightly later released "London Bridge" by Newtrament (Jive Records, 1983). Dizzy Heights was the first MC to be signed to a major label. Two singles from 1980 precede both of these however, namely Allen & Blewitt's novelty record "Chip Shop Wrapping", released in 1980, a parody of The Sugarhill Gang's "Rapper's Delight", and Bo Kool's "Money (No Love)". The instrumental for "Money (No Love)" was produced by Funk Masters member Tony Williams, and would turn out to be an influential release in its own right, going on to inspire DJ's from New York to employ influences from dub music.

In Scotland, actor and stand-up comedian Johnny Beattie released "The Glasgow Rap" in 1983, receiving some chart success at the time. He later claimed to be "Scotland's first rap star". This was one of several British novelty or comedy hip-hop singles which hit the UK charts during the 1980s, including "Wikka Wrap" by the Evasions, "Snot Rap" by Kenny Everett, "'Ullo John! Gotta New Motor?" by Alexei Sayle, "Rat Rappin'" by Roland Rat, and later in the decade, "Stutter Rap (No Sleep til Bedtime)" by Morris Minor and the Majors and "Loadsamoney" by Harry Enfield.

There were also early pop records which dabbled with rap – such as Adam and the Ants' "Ant Rap" (CBS, 1981) and Wham!'s "Wham Rap! (Enjoy What You Do)" (Inner Vision, 1982) — but these are often considered pop appropriations of US rap. Punk band the Clash had earlier dabbled with rap on the single "The Magnificent Seven" from their album Sandinista! (CBS, 1980), and a later single "This Is Radio Clash" (1981). Even earlier than this, in 1979, Ian Dury and the Blockheads released "Reasons to Be Cheerful (Part 3)", another record with influences from hip-hop.

Then Sex Pistols manager Malcolm McLaren's "Buffalo Gals" (Charisma, 1982), featuring the New York hip-hop group World's Famous Supreme Team, was the breakthrough hit that introduced the genre to the United Kingdom — McLaren's Duck Rock album as a whole experimented with many musical styles from around the world. "Buffalo Gals" and another track from the album, "World's Famous" which also featured the group, used techniques which have been established in hip-hop in the United States, such as sampling and scratching. McLaren even included a song referencing the 'Double Dutch' dance that was popular among breakdancing crews in New York at the time.

Over the next few years, more UK hip-hop and electro music was released: Street Sounds Electro UK (Street Sounds, 1984), which was produced by Greg Wilson and featured an early appearance from MC Kermit, who later went on to form the Wilson produced Ruthless Rap Assassins; the Rapologists' "Kids Rap/Party Rap" (Billy Boy, 1984) and Grandmaster Richie Rich's "Don't Be Flash" (Spin Offs, 1985). Releases were still few and far between, and the scene remained predominantly underground.

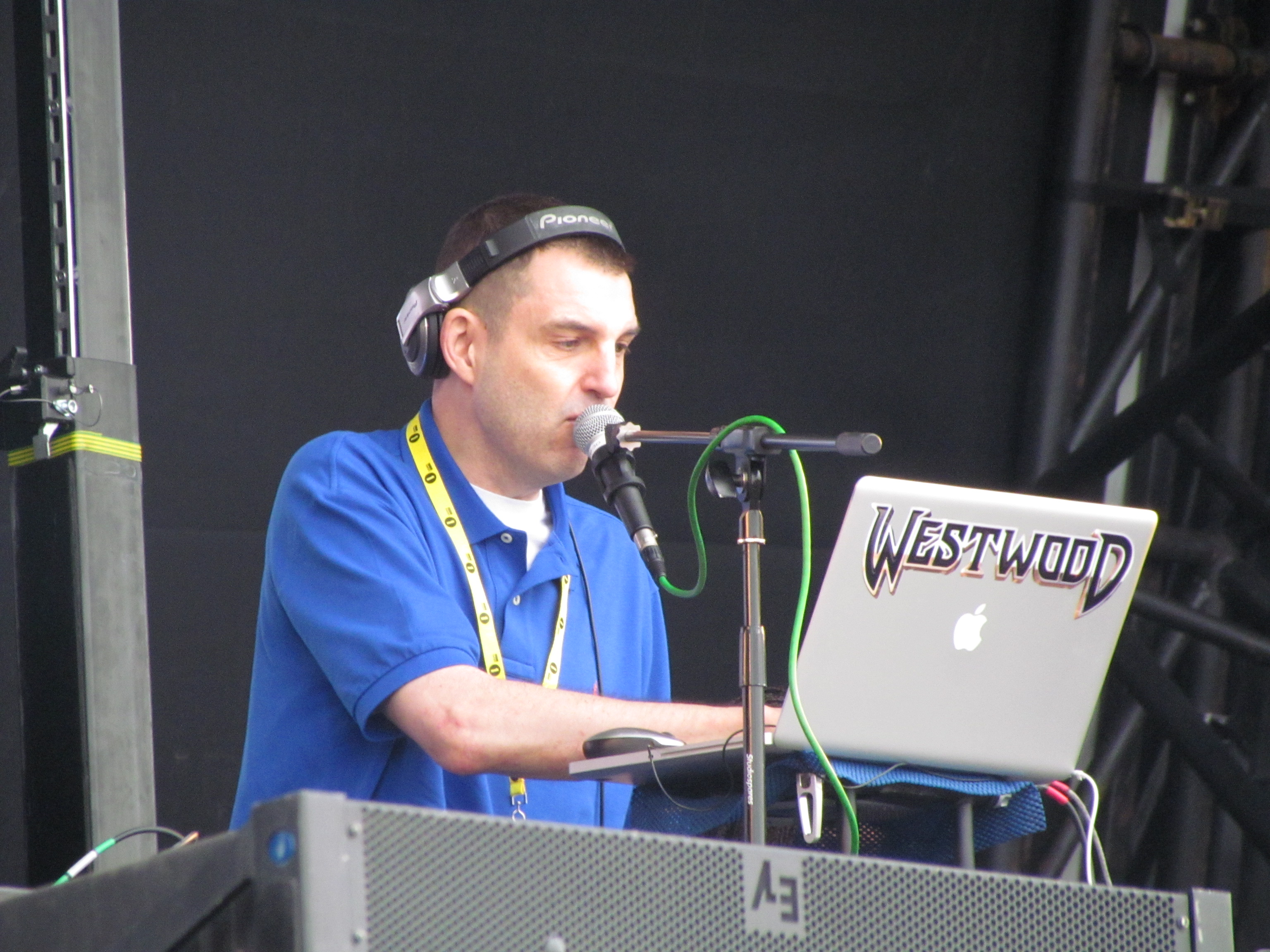
Westwood's official YouTube channel, Tim Westwood TV, has currently over 617 million video views and over 1.41 million subscribers. The channel has videos of freestyles and interviews from some of the most successful hip-hop artists, including Notorious B.I.G., Eminem, Jay-Z, Nas and Lil Wayne.

Although record labels began to take note of the underground scene throughout the 1980s and 1990s, radio play and publicity were still a difficulty in helping the fledgling scene to grow, and the scene only managed to survive through word of mouth and the patronage of pirate radio stations around the country. Mainstream radio did play British hip-hop on occasion, supported by such well-known DJs as Dave Pearce, Tim Westwood, Steve Barker and John Peel. A significant development in early UK rap was the nationwide Def Jam '87 Tour, which featured LL Cool J (billed as the headliner), Eric B. & Rakim, and a then-emerging Public Enemy. In an interview for What Do You Call It? From Grassroots to the Golden Era of UK Rap (2024), DJ, photographer, and broadcaster Normski described the experience to David Kane: "You've never heard anything so loud. We heard the records, but we've never seen it with so much ferocity in the flesh. By the end of the night, everyone was so pumped. That would have inspired everyone to go and do something badass."

British hip-hop in the 1980s was not just confined to music and break-dancing, but also involved the spread of New York City-style graffiti – another integral element of US hip hop culture — to London and other UK inner-city areas, both on walls and trains. The most direct influence was, however, on graffiti painted in London Underground trains. Teenagers from inner London and other European cities who were into electro-hip-hop and had family and other links to New York City had by the mid-1980s taken up some of the traditions of subway graffiti and exported them home, although legendary New York writers like Brim, Bio, and Futura had themselves played a significant role in establishing such links when they visited London in the early-to-mid-1980s and 'put up pieces' on or near the west London end of the Metropolitan Line. Almost as significantly, just when subway graffiti was on the decline in New York City, some British teenagers who had spent time with family in Queens and the Bronx returned to London with a "mission" to Americanise the London Underground through painting New York City-style graffiti on trains. These small groups of London 'train writers' adopted many of the styles and lifestyles of their New York City forebears, painting graffiti train pieces and in general 'bombing' the system, but favouring only a few selected underground lines seen as most suitable for train graffiti. Although on a substantially smaller scale than what had existed in New York City, graffiti on London Underground trains became seen as enough of a problem by the mid-1980s to provoke the British Transport Police to establish its own graffiti squad modelled directly on and in consultation with that of the New York City MTA. At the same time, graffiti art on London Underground trains generated some interest in the media and arts, leading to several art galleries putting on exhibitions of some of the art work (on canvas) of a few London train writers as well as TV documentaries on London hip-hop culture like the BBC's Bad Meaning Good, which included a section featuring interviews with London train writers and a few examples of their pieces.

While many early rappers from the UK, such as Derek B, imitated the styles and accents of their US heroes, there were many who realised that to merely transpose US forms would rob UK hip-hop of the ability to speak for a disenfranchised British constituency in the way that US hip-hop so successfully spoke to, and for, its audience. Attempts were made by UK rappers to develop styles more obviously rooted in British semantics, syntax and dialectical linguistic praxis and practices — Rodney P of the London Posse deliberately chose a London accent – although many succeeded only in adopting a slurred hybrid that located the rap "somewhere in the middle of the Atlantic Ocean".

=== Development: Late 1980s–early 1990s ===
The first record label devoted to releasing UK hip-hop acts was founded in 1986. Simon Harris' Music of Life label was home to rapper Derek B, the first UK rapper to achieve chart success. He even collaborated with Public Enemy on his album Bullet from a Gun and was the first British rapper to appear on Top of the Pops.

Building on Derek B's success, Music of Life went on to sign groups such as Hijack, the Demon Boyz, Hardnoise (later Son of Noise) and MC Duke. Their Hard as Hell series mixed homegrown talent like Thrashpack and the She Rockers with US artists such as Professor Griff. Music of Life was swiftly followed by other labels such as Mango Records and Kold Sweat. Another successful British hip-hop artist that emerged from Music of Life was Asher D, whose Jamaican origins showed through in his vocal style. In 1988, in collaboration with Daddy Freddy, Asher D released one of the first hip-hop dancehall fusion albums, Ragamuffin Hip-Hop.

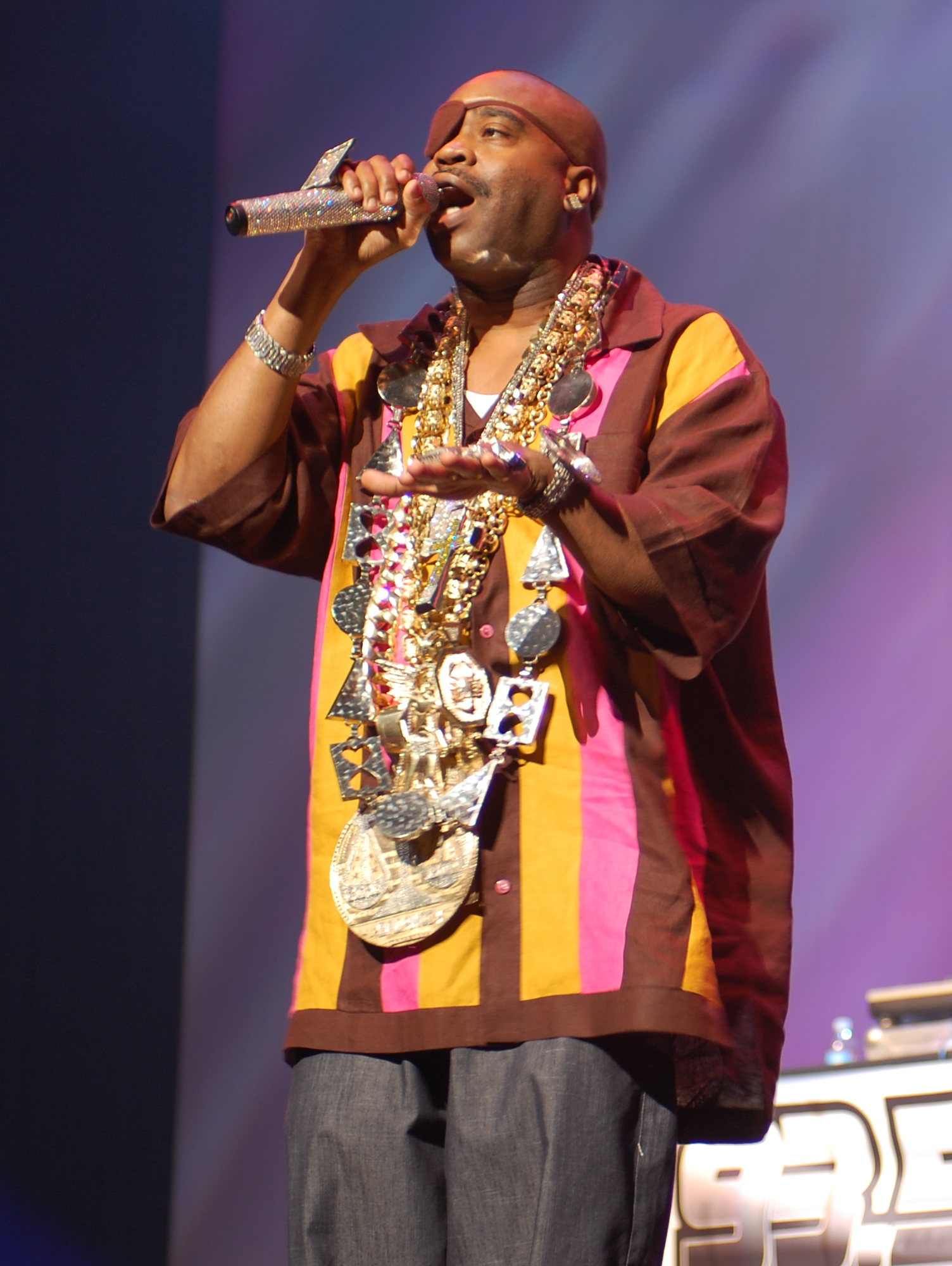
Slick Rick is an English rapper.

Moving away from its US roots, British hip-hop started to develop its own sounds: acts like Hijack, II Tone Committee, Eastborm, Killa Instinct, Hardnoise, and Silver Bullet developed a fast and hardcore style (often referred to as Britcore), while many other acts took influences from elsewhere. Britcore acts were amongst the first to receive wide-spread attention across continental Europe. Caveman and Outlaw Posse developed a jazz influenced style, whilst MC Mell'O' mixed jazz and hardcore. London Posse, Black Radical Mk II and DJ Ruf Cut And Tuf C were more influenced by reggae and disco whilst the Wee Papa Girl Rappers, Cookie Crew and Monie Love achieved chart success with more radio-friendly hip-hop. However, despite the chart success of some British-born hip-hop artists – for example Monie Love, Slick Rick, Young MC and MF Doom, who all moved to the US – the majority of the scene was still underground and small scale.

Kinetic Effect joined the scene in the early 1980s and was part of rap outfit 2 the Top as D-Koy; later, in 1991, he teamed with Insane Macbeth to record "Borderin' Insanity" (released in 1993) and in 1995, he recorded "Man Bites Dog"/"The Effect of Fear" Their song "The Rhythm I Give 'Em" made the UK Top 10 Hip-hop chart.

In 1987, Positive Beat Records came out of the hotbed of early UK hip-hop, Ladbroke Grove in London with two releases. The label followed up the single "It's Getting Rough" by Rocky X and D-D Dance with the Various Artists' Known 2 Be Down album. This featured Sir Drew (of KREW and Newtrament), MC Flex, She Rockers, Rapski and more of West London's finest rap talents.

Other notable labels at the time included Liberty Grooves in Tooting, South London. The label itself started in late 1989 with the first release in 1990 by Whirlwind D & Johnny F of Solid n Mind. Other artists included Gutter Snypes, True Style and DJ Noize. Liberty Grooves was also a shop and many notable artists such as MC Mell O and Braintax would perform there.

In 1988, Rapski released "The Connection" on 12". The track was taken from Known 2 Be Down and was an early example of mixing hip-hop and reggae in a (London) style. More was to come in the early 1990s in the form of MC Reason (a.k.a. Voice of Reason) with "Symbolise"/"HouseQuake" and Jonie D with "Which Base"/"Ride On" which was performed live on ITV in 1991.

A mindset began to develop – typified by the Gunshot tune "No Sell Out" (1991), or Son of Noise's "Poor But Hardcore" (1992) — that distrusted successful artists who did not use the hardcore style most associated with the scene. Silver Bullet's chart success was applauded due to an uncompromisingly rapid delivery. As the scene grew, it became less common for British rappers to imitate US accents (those who did were often ridiculed) and British rap became more assured of its identity.

Hip Hop Connection — the first major British hip-hop magazine – was founded in 1989 and by the early 1990s the British hip-hop scene seemed to be thriving. Not only was there a firm base of rappers in London such as Blade, Black Radical Mk II, Bushkiller (including Sirus) and Overlord X, who cut a Discomix with Jah Shaka — but many distinct scenes developed nationally. Jah Shaka recorded a crossover dubplate discomix tune with Overlord X (under the moniker Raggafunk ) entitled "Come And Get Me", which was a retake of a futuristic, radical tune from Shaka's conscious roots "Dub Symphony" album, which was eventually released on the Island Records' subsidiary label Mango.

Birmingham and the West Midlands gave rise to Credit to the Nation, whose MC Fusion would espouse conscious anti-racist, sexist and homophobic lyrics. The band would also find some brief mainstream success with their indie rock crossover sound. Leeds spawned Braintax and Breaking the Illusion (who together founded Low Life Records) as well as Nightmares on Wax. Greater Manchester gave birth to the Ruthless Rap Assassins, Krispy 3 (later Krispy), the Kaliphz, Jeep Beat Collective and MC Tunes.

Bristol's scene has a long history going right back to the early 1980s where links were made with outfits from New York. The Fearless Four came over in 1984 along with graffiti legends the Tats Cru and Rock Steady Crew. Bristol (specifically the St. Pauls area) produced The Wild Bunch (later better known as Massive Attack), and Nellee Hooper who went on to produce for Soul II Soul, as well as cutting dubplate discomixes with roots reggae artists, Horace Andy and Mad Professor. The city later became the home of trip hop with artists like Tricky and Portishead.

Caveman signed to a major label — Profile Records, the label home of Run–D.M.C. — and Kold Sweat came into their own, discovering groups like SL Troopers, Dynametrix, Unanimous Decision and Katch 22, whose "Diary of a Blackman" was banned by Radio 1 for using a sound clip from the National Front.

In 1991, Hijack released The Horns of Jericho (Rhyme Syndicate Records, 1991) on Ice-T's recently formed Rhyme Syndicate label. The first single, "The Badman Is Robbin'", was a top 40 hit and they went on sell more than 30,000 albums.

British hip-hop was affected by the record industry clamping down on sampling, beginning to charge for the use of samples and prosecuting those who used them without permission. Larger US acts could afford to license samples and still turn a profit for their labels, a luxury not available to many smaller UK artists. One such victim of this was Milton Keynes group the Criminal Minds. Their first two releases, the 1990 mini-album Guilty as Charged and a 1991 EP Tales from the Wasteland were bogged down by potential sample clearance problems and thus were only ever made available in small numbers. As breakbeat hardcore music started to become very popular in the UK in the early 1990s, the Criminal Minds turned their attention to making this type of music instead.

The UK hip-hop boom never achieved its predicted commercial success. Hijack's The Horns of Jericho was never released in the US, whilst record companies dropped artists, citing poor sales and lack of interest. Mango Records closed down, and the British public began to turn their affections to Jungle music, a fusion of breakbeat hardcore, dub, dancehall, ragga, hip-hop and reggae, profoundly influenced by the rhythmic dynamics of King Tubby's and Scientist discomixes and the spatial reverberations of Jah Shaka and Lloyd Coxsone sound systems, both of whom attracted followers with an almost religious sense of awe and devotion to sound, specifically, to bass tones and frequencies. Other acts and styles developed from the hip-hop scene, resulting in new genres to describe them – for example Massive Attack with trip hop, or Galliano, Us3 and Urban Species with acid jazz.

In the period between 1992 and 1995, the only groups to make much impact were Gunshot and the Brotherhood. Gunshot's 1992 album Patriot Games was a landmark with tracks such as "Mind of a Razor" and "World War 3" becoming British hardcore classics. Formed in the '80s, the Brotherhood released their first record, simply called Brotherhood EP, as a white label in 1991. They went on to release Wayz of the Wize in 1992, then Untitled 93 and XXIII in 1993, and Hip Hop N' Rap in 1994, all on the Bite It! label. None of the records sold in huge numbers but they managed to gain airplay on the Tim Westwood show and DJ 279's show on Choice FM, gaining them a solid following across the UK. Bite It! also released tracks from artists such as Pauly Ryan and the Scientists of Sound.

=== New generation: Late 1990s–early 2000s ===
Following an initial flurry of interest from major record labels in the 1980s, by the early 1990s the scene had moved underground after record companies pulled back. In the mid-1990s hip-hop in the UK started to experiment and diversify – often mutating into diverse genres entirely, such as trip hop and began making inroads into the US market.

As the old rappers left the scene, a new generation, raised on hip-hop and electronica, was coming of age: The Herbaliser released Remedies (Ninja Tune, 1995), Mr. Scruff released the "Frolic EP Pt 1" (Pleasure Music, 1995), Mark B released "Any More Questions?" (Jazz Fudge, 1995) and DJ Skitz released "Where My Mind Is At/Blessed Be The Manor" (Ronin Records, 1996) featuring a young rapper called Roots Manuva on guest vocals who had previously released the single "Next Type of Motion" (Sound of Money, 1995).

Record labels that attempted to merge British hip-hop style and sensibilities with modern dance music began to emerge, like Mark Rae's Grand Central (home to Aim, Rae & Christian, and Fingathing, among others) or DJ Vadim's Jazz Fudge. Increasingly, these artists managed to avoid the issues surrounding sampling by making music themselves (bands such as the Stereo MCs began playing instruments and sampling their own tunes) or searching out more obscure records where a most cost effective licensing deal could be arranged.

British hip-hop began to go through a renaissance, its style shifting from the hardcore template of its youth and moving into more melodic territory.

The Brotherhood managed to broker a major deal with Virgin Records in 1995. Continuing their relationship with Trevor Jackson as their producer, they released 3 singles 'Alphabetical Response', 'One Shot', 'Punk Funk' and their album Elementalz, all in 1996. Their work was met with critical acclaim and they toured solidly with American artists including Cypress Hill, The Roots and WuTang, but big record sales seemed to be very elusive and they parted ways with Virgin in 1998.

In late 1996, Will Ashon started up his new Ninja Tune backed label Big Dada and planned a roster of performers. Bandit of Birmingham's MSI/Asylum crew informed Will of Juice Aleem that he was contemplating who could truly represent the ethos of the new label. Ashon was impressed with the demo and agreed to have Aleem on board. The results of this were the first release of the now famous record label: in 1997 Juice featured on Big Dada record label's first ever release[2], "Misanthropic", under the pseudonym "Alpha Prhyme", a collaboration between himself and Luke Vibert.

In 1998, Mark B and Blade released "Hitmen for Hire EP", which featured guest appearances from Lewis Parker and Mr Thing (of the Scratch Perverts). The EP was a success, and led to the successful 2001 album The Unknown, which despite never charting in the UK top 75, was still a top 100 success and an even bigger success within its genre. Also, the album spawned the 2001 top 40 single "Ya Don't See the Signs", which was a remix by Feeder frontman Grant Nicholas, after the title track was a top 75 hit and Blade with Mark B supported Feeder. The same year, Bristol's Hombré label released the "2012 EP" from Aspects, a benchmark release within the movement. Roots Manuva, Blak Twang, Mud Family, Ti2bs, Task Force, Phi Life Cypher, MSI & Asylum, Jeep Beat Collective and Ty all came to the public's attention, while veteran acts Rodney P, Mike J, and MC Mell'O' returned to the scene.

=== Rise to mainstream: 2000s–2010s ===
A new generation of artists emerged following the turn of the century, including Jehst, Skinnyman, Nicky Spesh, Foreign Beggars and Usmaan. At the same time, a new style of electronic music emerged in the early 2000s, derivative of UK garage and jungle, with influences from dancehall, drum and bass and hip-hop; this new genre was dubbed "grime" (sometimes called eskibeat or sublow) and effectively superseded UK hip-hop in both popularity and the mainstream conscious. Grime is generally considered to be distinct from hip-hop due to its roots primarily being genres such as UK garage and jungle. In 2001, Roots Manuva claimed that British hip-hop "is more healthy" than American hip-hop, and is more about making the music than is it about exploiting wealth or hitting it rich.

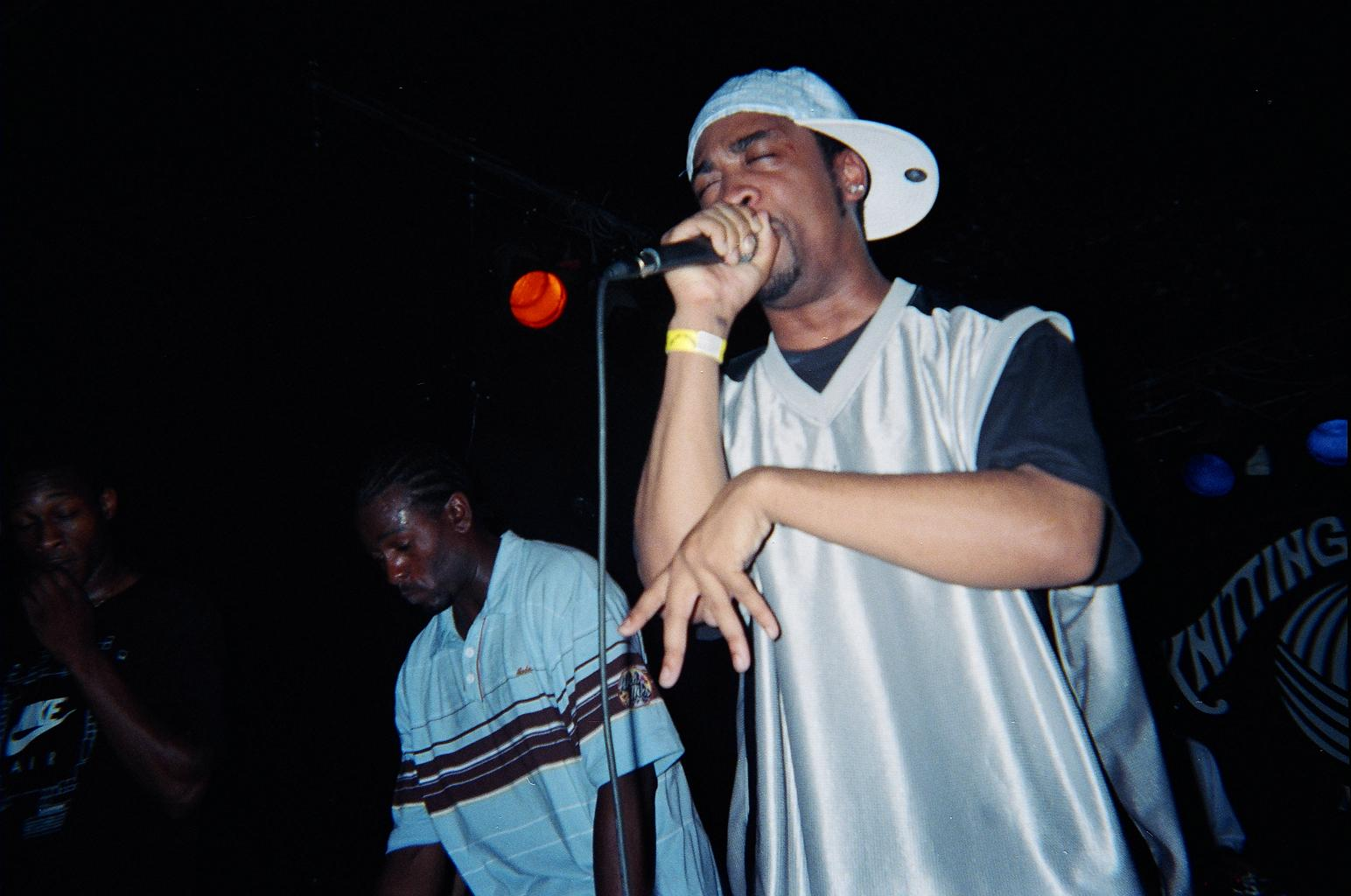
Wiley was appointed a Member of the Order of the British Empire (MBE) in the 2018 New Year Honours for services to Music.

Success followed The Streets' 2002 album Original Pirate Material, and he became one of the first of the new breed of British hip-hop artists to gain respectable sales, though his verbal style resulted in him being shunned by many artists in the scene. Such success has caused a surge in media exposure of other British hip-hop acts. Welsh rap group Goldie Lookin Chain also achieved chart success with their tongue-in-cheek take on hip-hop. Key records such as Skinnyman's Council Estate of Mind, and Klashnekoff's The Sagas Of... were released, cementing the reputations of the artists and opening up the floor for new artists to emerge. Labels Low Life Records, run by prominent political rapper Braintax, and Young N' Restless started and became the starting point for many. At the same time, just as garage was losing momentum, grime was creating interest. Dizzee Rascal would release his debut studio album Boy in da Corner in 2003 to widespread critical acclaim and would go on to win the Mercury Prize and be certified Platinum by the British Phonographic Industry (BPI), while Wiley's Treddin' on Thin Ice (2004) became a cornerstone of the genre. From then on, grime artists were the only MC's for interested record labels, and UK Hip-Hop's momentum dried up.

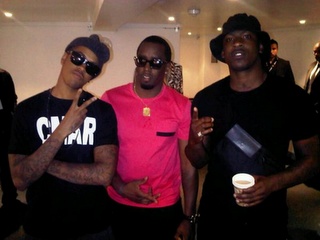
Chipmunk (left) and Skepta (right) with American rapper Sean Combs in 2011. Combs has also given recognition to Stormzy.

A new generation of young socially conscious hip-hop musicians emerged as a counter to the grime scene that many in the UK Hip-hop scene perceived as commercial. These rappers strived to bring attention to both positivity and lyricism as well as the injustices of war, gentrification and racism, following in the tradition of conscious rappers such as Nas, Mos Def and Talib Kweli. Amongst this new generation included artists such as Klashnekoff, Akala, Lowkey and the Poisonous Poets.

The mid-2000s saw the emergence of road rap, a genre that took influences from American gangsta rap and focused on crime, gang, or violent themes. Road rap was pioneered by artists and groups such as PDC and Giggs' SN1 (Spare No. 1) crew.

By the late 2000s, grime music had entered into a period of stagnation. This led to an emergence of acts that, while influenced by or initially started out making grime, were moving into a more commercialised, hip-hop influenced form of music. Artists from this new wave included N-Dubz, Tinchy Stryder, Tinie Tempah, and Chipmunk (later known as Chip) who emerged in the late 2000s to great commercial success. Tinchy Stryder scored two number ones with songs "Number 1" and "Never Leave You" and became the best-selling British solo artist of 2009. The following year continued the success of the previous, with acts like Professor Green and Tinie Tempah breaking through to even bigger commercial success and also critical appreciation. The debut album from Tinie Tempah called Disc-Overy went to number one in the UK Albums Chart and was certified platinum on 1 March 2011. He also won a Brit Award for his number one single "Pass Out". Rapper Plan B found success with his 2010 hip-hop and soul fusion album The Defamation of Strickland Banks, followed by the soundtrack album Ill Manors in 2012, both of which peaked at number 1 in the UK Albums Chart. In 2014, Scottish alternative hip-hop trio Young Fathers won the Mercury Music Prize for their album Dead. The album entered the UK chart at 35 after they won the award. Riz Ahmed, also known as Riz MC, was featured in the song "Immigrants (We Get the Job Done)" in The Hamilton Mixtape, which topped the Billboard 200 chart in 2016. At the 2017 MTV Video Music Awards (VMAs), "Immigrants" won the award for Best Fight Against the System.

=== Mainstream: 2010s ===
The early 2010s saw the emergence of UK afrobeats, led by artists such as Mista Silva, Kwamz, Fuse ODG, and Timbo. Around the same time, artists such as Sneakbo and Timbo were incorporating melodic rap and Caribbean influences into their music. The foundation set by these artists would later be a major influence on Afroswing, a genre that emerged around 2014 derivative of UK afrobeats while carrying influences from grime, dancehall, hip-hop, and R&B.

UK drill is a subgenre of drill music and road rap that originated in the South London district of Brixton from 2012 onwards. Borrowing heavily from the style of Chicago drill music, UK drill artists often rap about violent and hedonistic criminal lifestyles. Typically, those who create this style of music are affiliated with gangs or come from socioeconomically-deprived neighbourhoods where crime is a way of life for many. UK drill music is closely related to road rap, a British style of gangsta rap that became popular in the years prior to the existence of drill. Musically, UK drill often exhibits violent language and provocative lyrics.

The label was founded in 2010 by London rapper Fliptrix and key members of the larger High Focus crew have included The Four Owls, Dirty Dike, Ocean Wisdom, Jam Baxter and Dabbla. Artists from the label have managed to build a sizeable following despite remaining underground, having performed to crowds of 25,000+ across Europe, played the famous Reading and Leeds Festivals in the UK and seen many tracks reaching multiple millions of views on YouTube.

In 2015, The Four Owls collaborated with highly respected US producer DJ Premier for their track Think Twice . BRIT Award winning singer-songwriter Rag'n'Bone Man also released two albums on the label in 2011 and 2014 – "Put That Soul on Me" (a collaboration with Dirty Dike) and "Dog n Bone" with Four Owls member and rapper/producer Leaf Dog. These albums are what eventually led to his signing with major label Columbia Records, however Rag'n'Bone Man has continued to feature on High Focus records releases such as the track "Mask" from Jam Baxter's album Touching Scenes in 2019.

Blah Records is also highly influential. The label was founded by Lee Scott (rapper) and Molotov in 2006 and currently managed and owned by Lee Scott and Salar. Key members of the Blah family include Lee Scott, Salar, Black Josh, Milkavelli, Jam Baxter and Cult of the Damned.

The mid-2010s saw the emergence of Abstract Orchestra, a British hip-hop orchestra that "explore the shared territory between jazz and hip-hop by taking modern classics such as Madvillain and J Dilla’s back catalogue and filtering them through classic arrangement techniques." The group is influenced by the style of hip hip associated with Detroit in the US and have recorded with Illa J and Slum Village. They perform with UK MC's Micall Parknsun, Joker Starr and Yungun.

By 2014, grime music was also experiencing a resurgence. While hip-hop did not immediately benefit from this, the rise of grime has been credited for re-opening the doors for competing genres such as hip-hop and afroswing that were also on the rise. Acts that would rise within the hip-hop scene within the following years include Dave, Kojey Radical, Slowthai, Little Simz, and Loyle Carner. Dave released a "Blackbox freestyle" in 2015 which helped him rise to prominence. The following year, Dave was noticed by Canadian rapper Drake, who later featured on a remix of his song "Wanna Know".

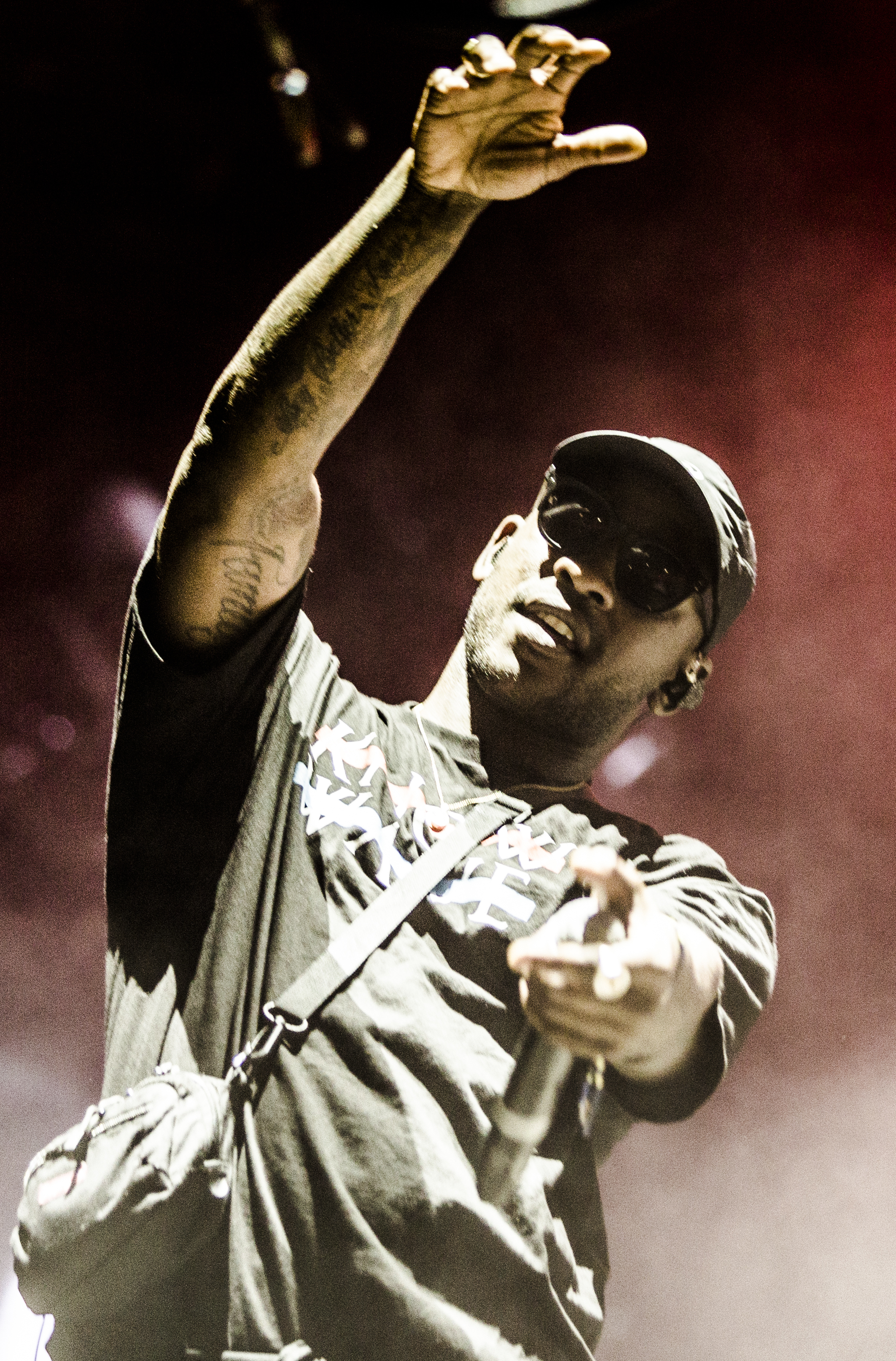
Skepta's Konnichiwa (2016) won the Mercury Prize and was named the Best Album of 2016 by Apple Music.

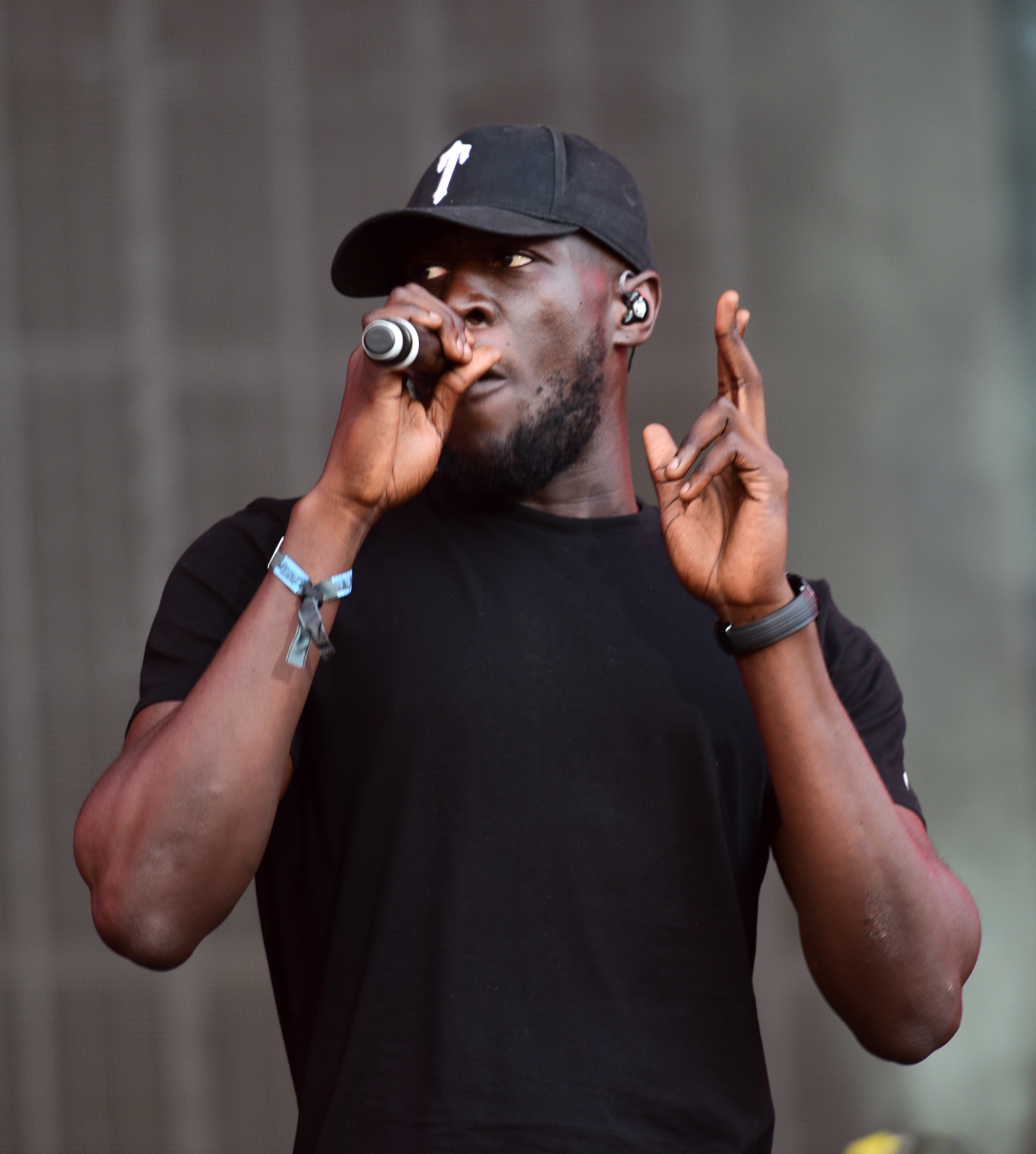
Stormzy's Gang Signs & Prayer is certified Platinum by the British Phonographic Industry (BPI).

Stormzy, an artist that came up out of the grime scene, released his debut album, Gang Signs & Prayer, on 24 February 2017. The album was a mixture of grime, hip-hop, and R&B, and was the first 'grime' album to reach number one on the UK Albums Chart. In February 2018, Gang Signs & Prayer won British Album of the Year at the 2018 Brit Awards. He has reached number one on the UK Singles Chart a total of two times; firstly as part of "Artists for Grenfell" on 23 June 2017 with song "Bridge Over Troubled Water", and secondly with his own solo single "Vossi Bop", which debuted at number-one upon its entry, ahead of "Me!" by Taylor Swift featuring Brendon Urie by some 500 combined sales.

Skepta, who also emerged from the grime scene, began collaborating with American hip-hop group ASAP Mob. He featured with ASAP Rocky on the song "Praise the Lord (Da Shine)", the second single from his third studio album Testing on 26 June 2018. It was the third collaboration between both artists, following Skepta's appearance on Cozy Tapes Vol. 1: Friends and ASAP Rocky's appearance on Skepta's Vicious EP in 2017, which also featured ASAP Nast, Lil B, and Section Boys. The song was successful in a number of countries, peaking at number 45 on the Billboard Hot 100 and number 18 on the UK Singles Chart. It was later certified Platinum by the Recording Industry Association of America (RIAA) and gold by the British Phonographic Industry (BPI). His 2016 album Konnichiwa won a Mercury Prize and had earned a gold certification in the UK.

In 2017, Dave did a freestyle on American radio station Power 106 Los Angeles which has accumulated over 1,000,000 views on YouTube. In 2018, Dave achieved his first UK number-one hit with "Funky Friday" which featured British rapper Fredo. Dave's debut album, Psychodrama (2019), debuted at number one on the UK Albums Chart and became the most-streamed first-week British rap album in the UK with a total of 23.6 million streams. The album was highly acclaimed and won Dave a Mercury Prize.

Slowthai released his debut studio album, Nothing Great About Britain, in 2019. The album was nominated for the Mercury Prize. He performed at the 2019 Mercury Prize ceremony, where he controversially held a fake severed head of British Prime Minister Boris Johnson on stage. Little Simz also released Grey Area in 2019 to much acclaim.

=== Underground revival: Early–Mid 2020s ===
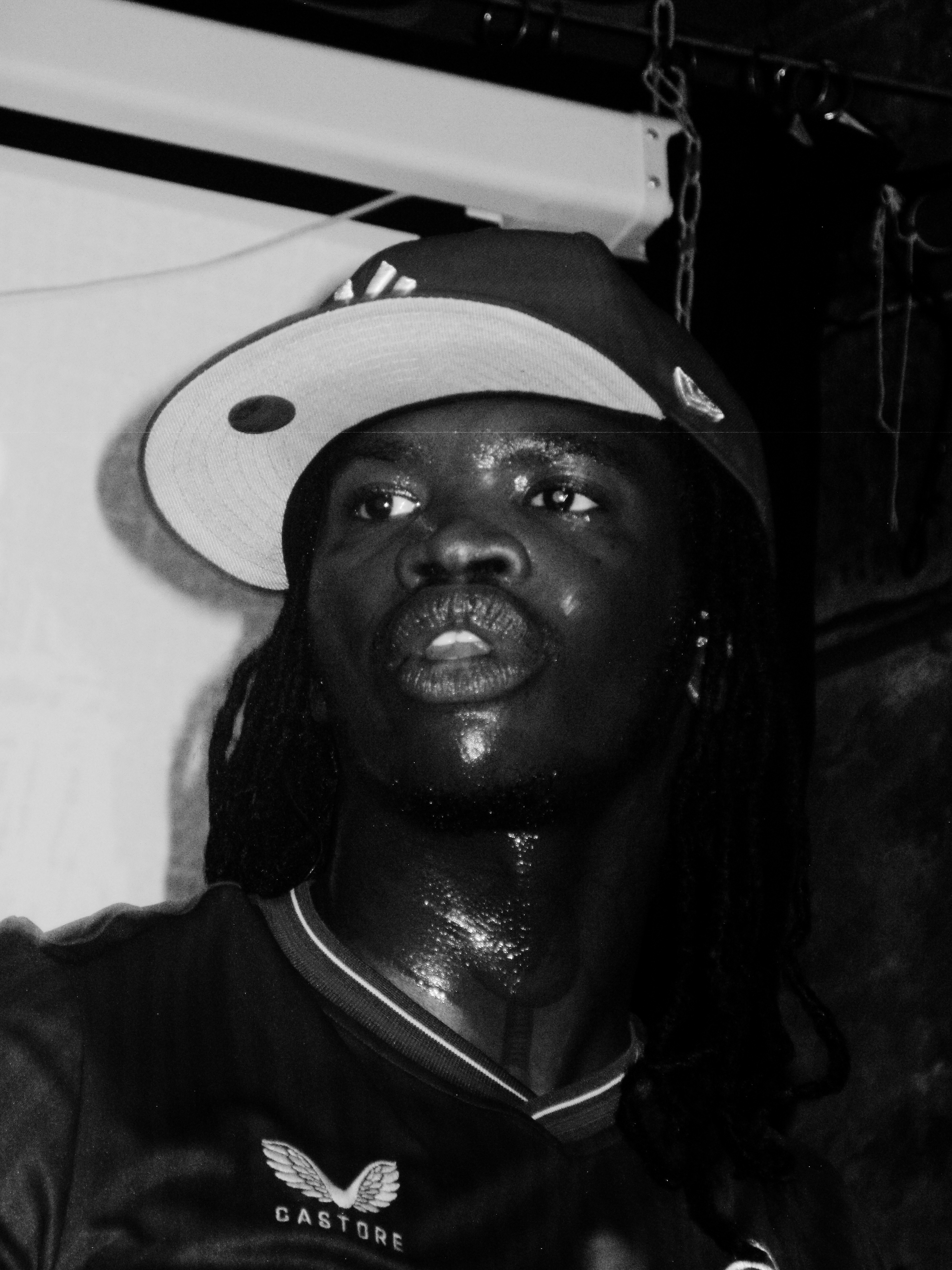
English rapper Lancey Foux has been a large influence on the UK Underground rap scene.

During the early 2020s, a new UK underground rap scene emerged in the United Kingdom, originally pioneered and popularised by artists such as Lancey Foux, Fakemink, Phreshboyswag, YT and Zukovstheworld, the scene became spearheaded by other artists such as Jim Legxacy, Fimiguerrero, Feng, Young Eman, SINN6R, Snoa, Ceebo, Svn4vr, Len Lucci, Ledbyher, and EsDeeKid. The scene is largely inspired by American internet rap genres such as cloud rap, plugg, rage and jerk.

Despite its initial "UK underground" label, the scene has since achieved significant commercial success, and the term has become synonymous with the musical subgenre as a whole, rather than denoting popularity. Some members of the scene, including Lancey Foux, have suggested the name "Overground" as a descriptor for this new genre, a reference to the London Overground train network.

This "new British Invasion" has been described as having an "experimental and maxed-out sound", as well as having a "distinctly British identity", including samples and references from the UK rave, grime and art pop scenes, such as Imogen Heap, David Bowie, Dizzee Rascal, Bizarre Inc and Sugababes. In visual artwork and music videos, many artists repeatedly used imagery of the Union Jack and British culture. This has been described by some as a rejection of the association of such imagery with the rise in far-right nationalist sentiment in the United Kingdom, with artists "reclaiming" the flag to represent a youth-driven multicultural idea of Britishness. Artists such as Jim Legxacy, YT and Niko B also referenced the late 2000s, incorporating Frutiger Aero and Frutiger Metro aesthetics, along with youth culture iconography such as the Nintendo Wii, BlackBerry phones and Just Dance.

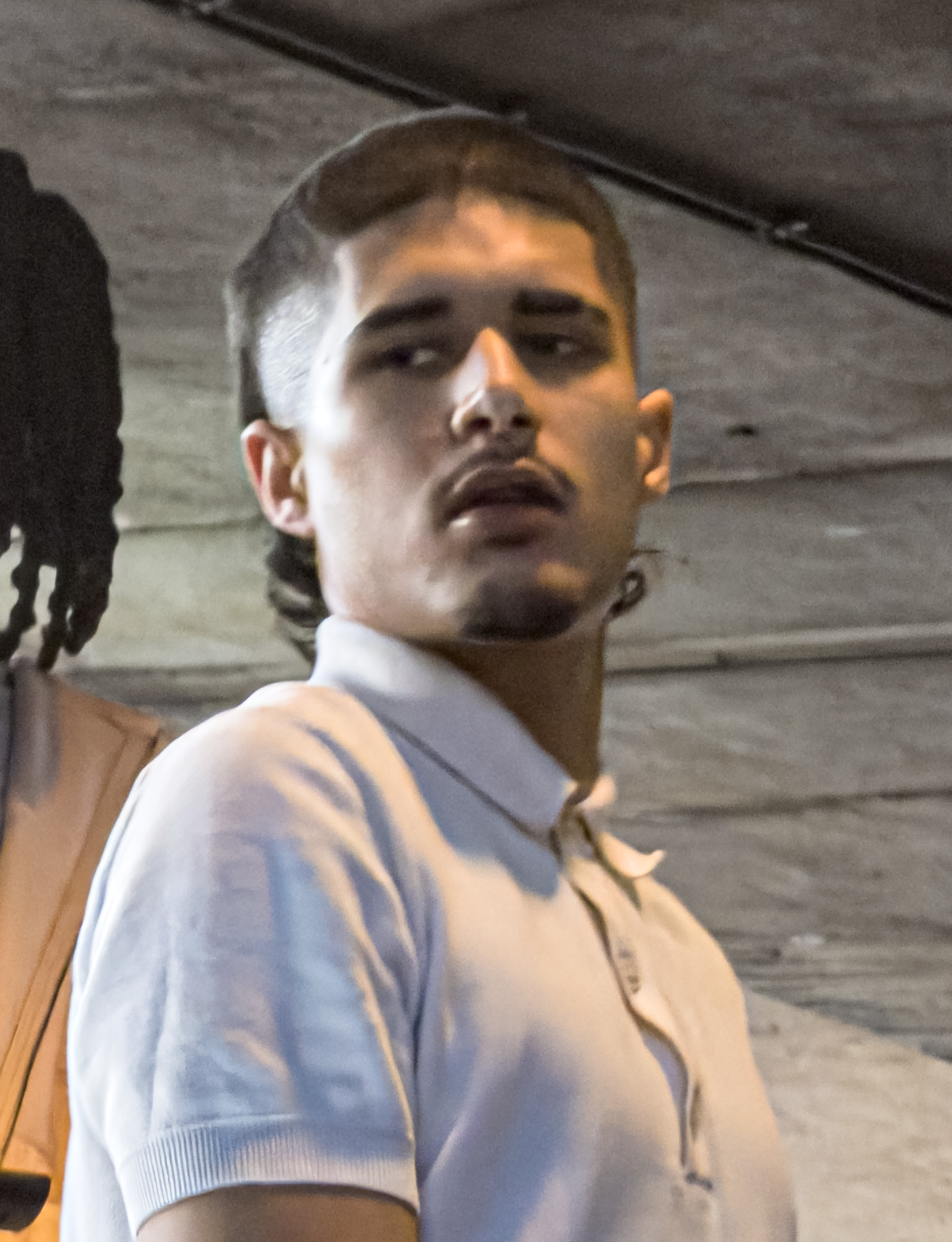
Fakemink has received endorsements from Drake, Frank Ocean, Clairo, Playboi Carti and actor Timothée Chalamet.

This era was heavily influenced by internet culture and childhood nostalgia, a result of this generation of artists being "robbed of their youth" due to the socioeconomic turmoil created by the 2008 housing crisis, Brexit, COVID-19, Russo-Ukrainian War and 2026 Iran War.

Lyrically, artists such as Ceebo, Jim Legxacy and afrosurrealist addressed growing up in poverty, immigration and postcolonial identity. This included describing their personal experiences with being second-generation immigrants who found it difficult to embrace both British identities and the identities of their first-generation immigrant parents.

The genre has achieved commercial and critical acclaim. Conglomerate, a collaborative mixtape by Fimiguerrero, Len, and Lancey Foux, reached number one on the UK R&B Albums Chart while Jim Legxacy's Black British Music charted in 47 countries and peaked at number 6 in the UK on Apple Music, with The Guardian giving the album a 5-star rating, and Clash rating it 9/10. During November 2025, EsDeeKid's debut album Rebel was the most streamed hip-hop album in the world on Spotify. This "UK rap revolution" has also been appreciated and endorsed by high-profile artists such as Dave, Drake, Frank Ocean, Timothée Chalamet, Clairo, Playboi Carti and PinkPantheress.

The first rap chart was launched by Radio 1Xtra.

== Road rap ==
Road rap (also known as British gangsta rap) is a genre of music pioneered in South London, primarily in Brixton and Peckham. The genre was pioneered by groups such as PDC, SMS, SN1, North Star, MashTown and U.S.G. and artists such as Giggs and K Koke and later Nines and Sneakbo. Road rap pairs street narratives and slow, heavyweight production, differentiating itself from grime. The genre came to the fore as a backlash against the perceived commercialisation of grime in the mid-late 2000s in London. The road rap scene centred around mixtape releases and YouTube videos with some of the genre's more popular acts getting mainstream recognition through underground dissemination routes.

=== 2003 - 2008 ===
UK Road Rap was supported by an infrastructure of a street-level mixtape economy. Music was released independently and distributed locally, which bypassed conventional routes, using pirate radios, car or shop steroes and mobile ringtones. The first mixtape by Giggs SN1 collective was released in 2003 while Giggs was still incarcerated. By 2008 SN1 had 20 releases, 100,000 mixtapes and the genre had risen to prominence.

Giggs's early collaborations with Blade Brown and Dubz established the sound. UK Road Rap contains explicit depictions of violence and British gang culture, similar to early grime music, combined with musical styles closer to American gangsta rap, using sub-bass and gritty samples, rather than the sound system influenced music of grime, dubstep, UK garage, jungle, reggae, and dub. A defining release was Walk in Da Park (2008) which uses sparse, bass-heavy instrumentals and unsentimental delivery to discuss criminal economies, differing from grime's rapid-fire MCing. John McDonnell describes the mix as "Dirty Southesque beats with bleak council estate visuals."

=== 2009 - 2013 ===
Giggs's rise opened the scene for a new generation of rappers from across London. These included, but is not limited to, Young Spray, K Koke, Sneakbo and Benny Banks. Their sound is described as having a menacing style and was dominant in areas such as Peckham, Lewisham, Hackney and Tottenham. Rappers had local credibility through using DIY distribution methods, e.g. mixtapes, street DVDs and YouTube.

The subject matter of this era of Road rap dealt with loyalty, imprisonment, violence, aspiration and the consequences of gang culture. The genre blends autobiography and performance, using local references and first-person narrative. Media coverage of Road rap framed the music and artists through its criminality and police attention, fear around association stopped mainstream radio from playing or promoting the genre.

In the early 2010s, the American genre drill began to emerge in the UK, pushed by groups such as 150, 67, and Section Boyz. Due to the influence road rap had on UK drill, it is understood to be a subgenre of road rap.

Road rap also went on to influence afroswing, which emerged the mid-2010s.

=== Gang culture and policing of Road rap artists ===
Gangs played a large part in the genre. Peckham Boys (with its various sets such as SN1, PYG, and OPB), based in Peckham and GAS Gang, based in Brixton, became notable in the Road rap scene during the 2000s. The genre was criticised for references to nihilism and violence, as well as its links to actual gang violence and imprisoned rappers serving for gang-related crimes. Similar to grime, road rap suffered from pre-emptive policing. Giggs claimed that the Metropolitan Police attempted to limit his opportunity to support himself financially by banning him from touring. In 2011, Stigs was served the first ever gang injunction which banned him from rapping about anything that may encourage violence.

== Trap scene ==
In several interviews, M Huncho has described his more tone-down, melodic style and moderately humbler approach when it comes to lyrics as his own derivative take on UK trap music, in a genre he has personally dubbed "Trap Wave". Wolverhampton artist Scarlxrd implements an energetic aesthetic and tone with explosively brazen screaming vocals, and dark yet reflectively intense and meaningful lyricism in an essentially self-pioneered style known as "trap-metal" or "ragecore"; a fusion of trap music and screaming vocals. Scarlxrd has cited some of his main inspirations and influences as including the likes of Eminem, Bring Me the Horizon, Limp Bizkit, DMX, Slipknot, Travis Scott and Linkin Park, among others.

== Backlash against commercialisation ==
Since grime's post-millennial boom period coincided with UK hip-hop's, the eagerly anticipated commercial breakout of the latter did not happen. Instead, acts such as Tinchy Stryder, Tinie Tempah, N-Dubz and Chip were signed to major labels and their traditional sound tweaked to fit a pop sensibility. However the lineage of these, and many UK rappers, is unquestionably grime rather than UK hip-hop.

There is a common belief within the underground hip-hop community that true hip-hop is music relevant primarily to the disenfranchised listeners, rather than the mass market. Because of the belief that mainstream acts are paid large sums of money by the major labels to make music tailored to the current mass market, these artists often face a backlash and accusations of 'selling out' from the underground community.

== Media ==
The growth of British hip-hop was given a boost when in 2002, the BBC launched a digital radio station 1Xtra devoted to "new black music" including hip-hop, R&B, soul, UK garage, dancehall, grime and drum and bass, however 1Xtra does not play exclusively British hip-hop. The cable and satellite channel, Channel AKA (formerly Channel U, now known as Now 70s) also had the profile of British hip-hop and grime. YouTube was also a very important outlet for upcoming and significant artists. Channels include Link Up TV, GRM Daily, SB.TV, Pressplay Media and Mixtape Madness.

== Women ==
Women have contributed to UK Rap in Britain from its inception. Pioneering British female rappers have included Cookie Crew, She Rockers, Wee Papa Girl Rappers, and Monie Love. Neneh Cherry (b. Stockholm) moved to England when she was 14 years old was a major contributer to early British Hip-Hop. Cherry's Raw Like Sushi (1989) was solely produced by British producers and was a massive hit in both the UK and US.

Contemporary female British rappers include Alesha Dixon, Baby Blue, C-Mone, Envy, Estelle, Lady Leshurr, Lady Sovereign, Little Simz, M.I.A., Nadia Rose, Shystie, NoLay, Stefflon Don, Ms Banks, Ivorian Doll, Mercury Prize Winners Ms. Dynamite and Speech Debelle and music producer Mizz Beats.

Women in hip-hop often confront a large amount of sexist stereotyping; however some female British rappers such as Lady Sovereign and M.I.A. have achieved success both in the UK and US. Artists such as Ms Dynamite, M.I.A. and Speech Debelle have also become known for political and social commentary in their music. Singer, songwriter and rapper Estelle said of the difficult position of female rappers: "I think they get a tough ride because some of them don't see themselves above and beyond the bullshit and no one's really given them that break."

== See also ==
- Afroswing
- Drill
- Gangsta rap
- Grime
- Hip-hop
- Music of the United Kingdom
- Scottish hip-hop
- Welsh hip-hop
- Irish rap
- Trap
- UK drill
- UK garage
