= Hardnoise =

British hip hop group

Hardnoise were an early British hip hop group. Hardnoise, along with early label-mates Hijack, was influential in establishing the UK hardcore sound. The group only released a handful of singles, before reforming with a changed membership as Son of Noise.

== Hardnoise ==
Whilst they were still at school, DJ Son, DJ Nyce D (real name Denis Roberts) and TLP1 joined together to form Hardnoise, at that time little more than a group of friends. When in college, they were joined by DJ AJ and Gemini, and they recorded their first tune, an unreleased song called "Pure Destructive Power" (Unreleased). Shortly afterwards, the group were joined by DJ Mada (real name Adam Pancho), the brother of founder member DJ Son. The group financed the release of their first single "Untitled" (white label, 1989), which quickly became an underground success. The single was heard by Music of Life, who signed the group to the label and rereleased "Untitled" (Music of Life, 1990).

Following this release, Nyce D died due to sickle cell disease. A further single, "Mice In The Presence Of The Lion/Serve Tea Then Murder" (Music of Life, 1991), came out to great acclaim, but shortly afterwards the group decided to go their separate ways. AJ continues to produce, and releases mixtapes on a regular basis, whilst Gemini worked with the group Bushkillers and went on to record under the name Bloodhound.

== Son of Noise ==
Following the breakup of Hardnoise, Son and Mada continued the Hardnoise sound with a new band, Son of Noise. They were joined by Curoc (Q-Roc, recently departed from Gunshot) and released the single "Son of Noise/Ill Justice" (Kold Sweat, 1991). The single was well received, but following disagreements with the record company over the use of the acapellas of their songs, the group parted company with Music of Life.

Son of Noise were subsequently signed by Music of Life's main rivals, Kold Sweat Records, and released more singles and their debut album The Mighty Son of Noise (Kold Sweat, 1992). Whilst recording this album, they were joined by a fourth member, DJ Renegade, who previously DJed with Blade and Most Dominant (the latter already with Kold Sweat from their promo "Pushed 2 Da Limit" (Kold Sweat, 1992) and whose MC Cel One went on to form the Gutter Snypes). The album was again well received, making good on the promise of the early singles (both as Son of Noise and as Hardnoise).

Following the release of the album, the group were still not completely satisfied with the attitude of their record company, and instead decided to leave. This time, instead of moving to one of the other burgeoning UK hip hop labels, they decided to finance their own recordings, as they had with the original "Untitled" (1989) single. This led to the "Crazy Mad Flow/Retrocide" (Little Rascool, 1993) single and the album Access Denied: Bullshit and Politics Pt 1 (Little Rascool, 1995). The album was not as well received as their previous releases.

DJ Swing, a.k.a. Brian Daley, died in 2006 from multiple myeloma. The surviving group members continued to pursue solo projects, and DJ Son, Renegade and Mada are still DJing in the scene in London – Renegade achieving success as one of the Scratch Perverts. Mada also maintains a British hip hop website.

Underground United in conjunction with Naked Ape Records, released two previously unreleased tracks from the early Son Of Noise era on the compilations, Underground United Vol. 1 and Underground United Vol. 3 in 2009 and 2016.

In 2021, Son of Noise released the EP "The Resurrection".

TLP1 passed away in 2022.

== Selected Discography ==
- Son Of Noise - The Mighty Son of Noise (Kold Sweat Records, 1992)
- Son Of Noise - Access Denied: Bullshit and Politics Pt 1 (Little Rascool, 1995)
- Hardnoise - The Untitled Sessions (2013)
- Son Of Noise - The Resurrection (2021)
