= Ruf Beats =

British record label

- Founded: 1993
- Founder: Jeep Beat Collective
- Genre: British hip hop
- Country of origin: United Kingdom
- Location: Manchester
- Official website: www.rufbeats.co.uk

Ruf Beats is an independent British independent record label. It was founded in Manchester, England, in 1993 by Dave Davis of Jeep Beat Collective.

== History ==
Originally started in 1993 The Ruf Label, now known as Ruf Beats Music, was a primarily an output source for Dave Davies (a.k.a. THE RUF or dave the ruf) projects and alias. JEEP BEAT COLLECIVE became known worldwide for championing scratching, heavy bass and killer ruf beats and had releases on ruf beats, ninja tune, US bomb, andy smith's document, justin robertson's journeys CD and many more. MINDBOMB was Ruf's British hip hop vocal group that helped establish credibility for rhyming in homegrown voices and mixed humour and politics over some smoking hot music. GODFATHER OF WEIRD is Ruf's strange soundtrack project. The Ruf Diamonds series and Thermonuclear Soundwars were albums to showcase the cream of hip hop from all over the UK Ruf Beats had over 25 releases up until 2003. Dave The Ruf is making new music for future release, and continues to DJ in his home-town of Manchester and around the world.

== Artists ==
- Jeep Beat Collective
- MindBomb
- Godfather of Weird
- K Delight
- Asti

Also compilation releases featuring:

Hearts of darkness, Suspekt, Metaphorce, Unanimous, Numskullz, Krispy, Icepick and DJ Supreme

== Compilations ==
- Ruf Diamonds Volume One (1996)
- Jeep Beat Collective – Repossessed Wildstyles – Classic Cuts (1998)
- Ruf Diamonds Volume 2 (1998)
- Thermo Nuclear Soundwarz (2000)
