= Gutter Snypes =

British hip hop group

- Genres: Hip Hop
- Years active: 1993 - 1994
- Label: Liberty Grooves
- Members: Cel One, Sigher, Prime Cuts
- Past members: First Rate

Gutter Snypes are a British hip hop group who formed in 1993. The group was composed of Cel One, Sigher (Russell Paine) and Prime Cuts. Previously the Cel One had recorded under the name Most Dominant for the Kold Sweat Records label, with DJ First Rate and DJ Renegade (Son of Noise). Prior to this, Cel One and First Rate had been part of the First Down Crew in Kent.

In 1993, the group met Johnny F and started recording with Liberty Grooves. This union would lead to the Trials Of Life EP in 1994. Three versions of the EP were recorded (regular, radio edits and instrumental) and it even gained the attention of Nellee Hooper who sampled it on the track Inside Of Me for the 1994 LP Bedtime Stories by Madonna. Gutter Snypes performed alongside many other UK rap groups including Sniper and Principal Mark (Prime Rhyme Masters). In 2005 Cel One returned to music alongside Prime Cuts with their Dog London imprint and subsequent single Watchamindsay/Code Red, while Sigher returned to the game in 2009 with his Keep On Pushing/Hitman Harry single on his Elcal label.

The Gutter Snypes have now reassembled in 2013 and are recording an Album yet to be titled with an addition to the group in Mista Dexter (DJ with The Brotherhood). They are developing 10 tracks with collaborations from the likes of Audessy and Oxygen from SoundSci and Grand Wizard Ghettosocks. The Album should be released later in 2013 on the Slice of Spice record label based in Brooklyn NYC.

Over the years, Prime Cuts has remained prolific as part of the Scratch Perverts, winning the DMC Team championships in 1999.

== Discography ==
- Gutter Snypes - The Trials Of Life Radio Edits (1994)
- Gutter Snypes - The Trials Of Life EP (1994)
- Gutter Snypes - The Trials Of Life Instrumentals (1994)
- Gutter Snypes - "Game tight"/"6ft and change" super disco edits (2014)
- Gutter Snypes - "Sucker punch"/"Jillian" super disco edits (2014)
