= Positive Beat Records =

British independent record label

Positive Beat Records is a British independent record label formed in West London's Ladbroke Grove in 1987. The label presses and sells recordings of local artists.

== History ==
The label's first single "Your Love Is Quality" was released on 7" and 12" vinyl by soul/dance group Interfaze with a video promo directed by Nic Hofmeyr filmed around Ladbroke Grove. The voice of Interfaze was Maxine Harvey a London soul music singer, who had been working on the local circuit.

1987 saw the release of the label's second single "It's Getting Ruff" by Rocky X and DD Dance two local emcees of North African extraction with a cover picture on the area of ground that was developed into Sainsburys. This year also saw the recording at Addis Ababa Studios on Harrow Road of Known 2 Be Down and its release through EMI and Jet Star distribution.

Over 20 local artists, loosely defined as "the Lay Low Crew" and led by Sir Drew, contributed to the 10 songs and it established the credibility of original British rap as opposed to copies of US styles. Time Out magazine called the album "matured, independent, thoughtful and assured" while The Voice ran a full page spread in October 1987. The launch party at the Tabernacle in Powis Square was a major local happening. After the album's release She Rockers with Betty Boo got signed to a major as did DJ Loose, who joined Cash Crew, Sir Drew, Iroc, and Flex became Mighty Ethnicz, Mell-o-D formed NSO and the scratch DJ DJ Streets Ahead gained worked on TV.

After the album the label started the Positive Beat Roadshow linking in with Sahara Sound System for the next two years. The Roadshow worked by taking artists from the Known 2 Be Down project and local street poets, emcess, Djs and beat boxers around London to community centres and cultural events. The mainstays of the Roadshow were MC Reason a local b-girl and emcee, DJ Chin, Jonie D, Scare 437, Rapski and Echo the human beat box. The resulting shows and interest generated culminated in events such as Raps New Generation at Dingwalls with Camden Arts and performances at Stratford Rex.

1990 saw 12" single releases for two emcees who had built growing reputations from the roadshow performances, MC Reason with "Symbolise" and Jonie D with "Which Base". "Symbolise" got a lot of air play and Mix Mag called it ‘a home made contender for the jazz-rap scene’ while "Which Base" was performed on ITV and Blues & Soul Magazine felt it would have ‘sound following from the hardcore’.

1991 saw Jonie D release "Dance Positivo" which mixed hip hop and mambo brass that Mix Mag called "moody little beast" in predicting that Jonie D would become "a quietly unassuming star"

The label's producer Skorpi described the vibe of the label "It's positivity. It's not called black neat, yellow beat, white beat or whatever beat. It's positive beat"

== Discography ==
=== Albums ===
- Known 2 Be Down (1987, Various)
- From Frontline To Theme Park (1992, Various)

=== Singles ===
- "Your Love Is Quality" (1987, Interfaze)
- "It’s Getting Ruff" (1987, Rocky X & DD Dance)
- "The Connection" (1988, Rapski)
- "Which Base?" / "Ride On" (1990, "Jonie D")
- "Symbolise" / "House Quake" (1990, "MC Reason")
- "Dance Positivo" (1991, "Jonie D")
