= Nicky Spesh =

British hip hop and grime artist

Nicky Spesh is a rapper from North London, England. A member of the emerging British hip hop and Grime scene alongside the likes of Sway, Nicky Spesh first became recognised when he freestyled over DJ Kool Herc's set at The Scala in London in 2002. Spesh also promoted and performed at his own club nights 'GMBeats present GMBeats' at the Bug Bar, in Brixton and WKD in Camden with his eponymous pirate radio crew.

== Career ==
In 2003 he appeared on DJ Rubbish's album Armageddon Sessions with GMBeats and also featured on the album Cassetteboy v DJ Rubbish Inside A Whale's Cock Vol 1 under the name Spectre. In September 2005 he released his first album The World I Know which received critical acclaim including the coveted 5 Stars in International DJ magazine: "Nicky's world is one heck of a fascinating place," they said. Kris Needs said "Nicky Spesh's highly addictive debut album takes UK Hip Hop to a level from its previous American emulations. It shows a unique world view translated into sci-fi fantasy and delivered amidst a lush gamut of beats and backdrops." in DJ Magazine September 2005.

Nicky has appeared on the radio in New Zealand bFM, and has also featured on BBC Radio Northern Ireland and Radio 1Xtra.

In 2006 he was a finalist at the UK Poetry Slam at the Theatre Royal Stratford East. He also won the word-up slam at the same venue. In 2007 he moved into music production for TV including work on Silent Witness, a Sky 1 docudrama, and the Triple Nipple Club documentary on Channel 4.

In 2019 he was the composer for TV Show "Beat The Internet" on Dave

2021 saw the release of his second full studio album "The Music Writes Itself"
