= Dynametrix =

- Origin: London, England
- Genres: Hip hop
- Years active: 1986–present
- Labels: Pinnacle Entertainment
- Members: Zee Anwar/Shane Ryan/ Best Igbinyemi
- Website: www.dynametrix.co.uk

Dynametrix were an early UK hip hop group from West London, mainly active from 1990 to 1996 but had been around in various guises since 1984.

== Members ==
Original group's members:

- Ace Shazamme (Shane Ryan) - Vocals/Production/DJ
- The Phantom (Best Igbinyemi) - Vocals
- 0026 (Zee Anwar) - Vocals
- Genius P (Paul Spooner) - Vocals
- DJ Knives (Robert White) - DJ

== Style ==
Their central appeal was the intoxicating beats and rhythms designed by Ace Shazamme (Shane Ryan), including both 1970s funk grooves and samples drawn from television and radio. Most of their work was released whilst signed to the Koldsweat label, including their first single "Keep Da Crowd Dancing" which sampled the Cliff Nobles track "The Horse". Their most notable work being the album A Measure Of Force, released by KoldSweatRecords in 1994.

== Post-career ==
DJ Knives left the group after the "Keep Da Crowd Dancing" 12 inch was released, shortly followed by Genius P who left the group after the This Ones 4 U EP. The remaining members of the group started work on their first album entitled A Measure of Force. After the release of the album the group commenced work on a second album tentatively entitled 'Underground to the Underground', which was never released.

Genius P died in 2001. The remaining members remain active, with the Phantom releasing two solo albums, The Anomaly in 1999 and The Art of Fighting in 2014, with producer Tom Dice on Don't Bite! Records. Ace Shazamme produced a number of artists, including Funky DL. 0026 hosts an old school hip hop radio show on Invader.FM called "The Hyperfunk Alienation".

== Discography ==
- "Keep Da Crowd Dancing" (1991)
- This Ones 4 U EP (1992)
- A Measure of Force LP (1994)

=== Appearances ===
- "Rogues Gallery" on Diary of a Blackman Living in the Land of the Lost - Katch 22 (1991)
- "I'm Not a Weakling" on It's Just Begun (1992)
- "Radical" on Right and Exact (1993)
- "For Real" on London Underground Volume 3 (1994)
- "Class Dismissed" on The Old Testament: Book I and Book II, Word Up Records (2005)
- "I Electrify" on Underground United Vol. 3, Naked Ape Records/Underground United (2016)
