= Black Radical Mk II =

- Birth name: Felix Joseph
- Born: 1971; Tottenham, London, England
- Genres: British hip hop
- Occupation(s): Rapper, songwriter
- Instrument: Vocal
- Years active: 1987–1998
- Labels: Rapp Records, Mango Records

Black Radical Mk II (born Felix Joseph in 1971) is a British hip hop artist from Tottenham, London, England. He was one of the pioneers of the British scene, releasing his first single in 1987 and continuing to release records until 1998. He is most well known for his strident political views, which he often used as the basis for his records.

== Biography ==
Black Radical was born in South London in 1971, and was inspired by Public Enemy's unflinching political stance to start making his own music. This resulted in him releasing his first single, "We Outta Here/B.Boys Be Wise" (Independent, 1987), at a time when the British hip hop scene was just starting. Black Radical moved to 2-Bone Records to release "Monsoon" (2-Bone, 1989) before signing with UK label Mango Records. This led to the release of the single "Rippin' Up The Industry" (Mango Records, 1990) in which Black Radical let rip at the practices of the UK record industry – a typically uncompromising move from an artist who had just moved to one of the UK's biggest hip hop record labels.

Two further singles and his debut album followed: The Undiluted Truth: A Black Man's Leviathan (Mango Records, 1991) is widely regarded as Black Radical's best album and showcases his political and religious views. The song "Sumarli" expresses his belief that black men and women should only date members of their own race, whilst "Sign of the Beast" details an apocalyptic vision and makes reference to the Nation of Islam's belief that the white man was created out of genetic experiments on black men carried out by the scientist Yakub. The album was popular, but Black Radical's views also caused an angry reaction from many people – including his own record company, who unceremoniously dropped the artist after the album was released.

Black Radical took three years before he released his next single, "This Iz War" (Copasetic Records, 1993), which was a response to the Roland Adams murder. An album – Double Edged Sword: The Pre LP (Black Foundation, 1995) – followed, but whilst the artist's delivery and lyrics were still up to their old standard, the album failed to achieve the same success of his debut. The move to a small, independent record label and the widespread collapse of the British hip hop scene were partly to blame in keeping the record from its audience, although equally it has been suggested that the music and production missed the attention of the Mango producers.

Again, Black Radical moved labels before releasing his final (to date) album, Khaos & Konfusion: The Spell of Leviathan (Blueprint Records, 1998). As before, this album failed to relaunch Black Radical's career and since then, the artist has gone underground again.

== Discography ==
- The Undiluted Truth: A Black Man's Leviathan (Mango Records, 1991)
- Double Edged Sword: The Pre LP (Black Foundation, 1995)
- Khaos & Konfusion: The Spell of Leviathan (Blueprint Records, 1998)
