= Kold Sweat Records =

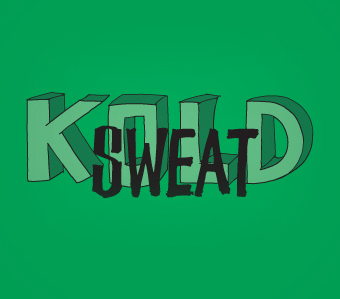
- Founded: 1990
- Founder: Anthony Powell (Tony Powell)
- Status: Defunct
- Distributor: Pinnacle Entertainment
- Genre: Hip hop
- Country of origin: United Kingdom
- Location: London
- Official website: www.koldsweat.com

Kold Sweat Records was a British independent record label specializing in hip hop music, based in Askew Road, London. The label was founded in 1990 by Tony Powell, who was the managing director, CEO at MCA Records between 1987 and 1992. Upon leaving MCA, Powell created Kold Sweat which was considered as a small project specific to the hip hop genre. He later employed Angelo Starr as recording engineer who was brother to the late Edwin Starr. The label had originally been created as an alternative to directly address the growing and popular trend of the emerging new and unsigned British rap acts throughout the UK.

Artists who recorded for Kold Sweat Records included:

- Blak Prophetz
- F9's
- SL Troopers
- Korperayshun
- Prime Rhyme Masters
- Dynametrix
- Unanimous Decision
- Son of Noise
- Katch 22
- The D.F.C.

The label closed in 1994 when Tony Powell became Director/CEO of Pinnacle Entertainment.
