= Jeep Beat Collective =

Jeep Beat Collective is the best known recording name of British hip hop DJ Dave Davies. He has also recorded under the names Mindbomb, Godfather of Weird and Dave the Ruf. His music carries a heavy emphasis on scratching, but he also raps. In 1999, Spin magazine included Jeep Beat Collective in their list of the "Top 13 turntablists" in the world. He also runs the Ruf Beats record label.

== Albums ==
As Jeep Beat Collective:

- Attack of the Wildstyle Beatfreaks (1995)
- For.... Jimi-Hendrix (1998)
- Technics Chainsaw Massacre (1998)
- Death Race 2001 (2001)

As Mindbomb:

- Trippin´ Thru the Minefield: Volume One
- Trippin´ Thru the Minefield: Volume Two
- Great British Beef

== Compilation appearances ==
- The Document - DJ Andy Smith
- Refried Food Parts 5 & 6 - DJ Food
- Operation Overlord - La Crème de la Crème of Underground British Hip-Hop (Coke Star Produktions/Night & Day, 1997) (French release)
- Operation Overlord - La Crème de la Crème of Underground British Hip-Hop (Coke Star Produktions/Virgin/EMI, 1998) (worldwide reissue)
