= She Rockers =

British hip hop group

The She Rockers were a female hip hop group from London, featuring Donna 'She Roc' McConnell, Antonia 'MC Aurra' Jolly, Dupe Fagbesa and Alison Clarkson (who later found fame as Betty Boo).

== Career ==
She Rockers' first release - as a trio of McConnell, Fagbesa and Clarkson - was a track on the Known 2 Be Down compilation of UK hip hop artists from West London. "Give It A Rest", the band's only single as a trio, followed on the Music of Life label, and was produced by Public Enemy's Professor Griff after the She Rockers performed an impromptu rap to Public Enemy at their local McDonald's in Shepherd's Bush, London; She Rockers also supported Public Enemy in the US. They later toured with De La Soul.

Clarkson and Fagbesa departed from the group in 1989, and founding member McConnell then joined forces with original band member Antonia Jolly (Aurra), and landed a recording contract with Jive Records, releasing several singles including "Jam It Jam", and an album, Rockers from London (Jive, 1990). Rockers From London showcased a move towards the contemporary hip house style, was part written and produced by Todd Terry and featured productions by Technotronic and Double Trouble. "Jam It Jam" reached No. 58 in the UK Singles Chart in January 1990.

In addition to She Rockers, MC Aurra recorded with Rhythm King artists Bomb The Bass and Merlin, Aurra and Clarkson - as Hit and Run - released a single on Rap Sonic records and Clarkson featured on Beatmasters single "Hey DJ/I Can't Dance To That Music You're Playing" before leaving for a successful solo career, which led Music Of Life to release a Simon Harris remix of "Give It A Rest" billed as She Rockers Featuring Betty Boo.

== Discography ==
=== Albums ===
- Rockers from London (Jive, 1990)

=== Singles ===
Year	Single	Peak positions	Album
Year	Single	UK	Album
1988	"Give It a Rest"	—	Single only
1989	"On Stage / Get Up on This"	89	Rockers from London...
1989	"Jam It Jam"	58	Rockers from London...
1990	"Do Dat Dance"	—	Rockers from London...
1990	"Hands Across the Ocean"	—	Rockers from London...
1990	"Give It a Rest (1990)" (featuring Betty Boo)	—	Single only
"—" denotes releases that did not chart.

=== Selected compilation appearances ===
- "First Impressions" on Known 2 Be Down (Positive Beat, 1987)
- "Give It A Rest" on Hard As Hell Vol. 3 (Music Of Life, 1988)
