= Liberty Grooves =

Hip hop record label

Liberty Grooves was a hip hop record label and shop based in Tooting, South London and owned by Johnny F. It was most active during the 1990s, and the shop served as a performance venue as well. Records were released on this label by groups including Solid n Mind and Gutter Snypes, and the artist DJ Noize.

== History ==
The Liberty Grooves label was established in 1990 with the release of Solid n Mind's debut single "An Original Break". This was followed up with the Brit Core styled Code of Conduct EP by True Style. In 1992, The Hip Hop Shop in Tooting opened its doors. As well as selling old and new hip hop records, it provided a platform for rappers and DJs to perform, including artists such as Shyloc, Principal Mark, Mell O and Whirlwind D. On New Year's Eve 1992–93, the shop hosted a hip hop jam featuring Lil Rodney Cee from the film Wildstyle as well as a host of UK rap crews including Def Tex, Lords of Rap and Braintax. A regular behind the desk serving customers was Big Ted (Kiss 100 London, London). In 1994, the label released The Trials of Life EP by the Gutter Snypes which was pressed in many different colours and mastered in the USA. Furthermore, the single was even sampled by Nellee Hooper for the Bedtime Stories album by Madonna in the same year. In the late 1990s, the label concentrated on US releases, teaming up with Stretch Armstrong's Dolo imprint to release the Freestyle Frenzy Series which showcased freestyles by artists such as Mad Skillz and Craig G. In 1995, Liberty Grooves was set to release a twelve-inch single by Akinyele (rapper); however the project never moved past the test pressing stage. All that existed were 17 test pressings. The significance of this is that this single, featuring production by Large Professor, is one of the most expensive rap records to ever exist, having sold for around £3000. The label also put out the first records by DJ Noize, who went on to win the DMC World DJ Championships in 1996. In 1999, the label ceased to trade until it was resurrected in 2009, with a limited edition pressing by Solid n Mind.

== Discography ==
- Solid n Mind featuring Whirlwind D & Johnny F – "An Original Break" (Lib001)
- Truestyle – "Codes of Conduct" (Lib002)
- Solid n Mind featuring Whirlwind D & Johnny F – "Centre Stage" / "Woke With Nothin'" (Lib002 1/2)
- Takin' Liberty's Vol. 1 LP (Lib003)
- Solid n Mind – Battle Tipped Rhyme (Lib003 1/2)
- Gutter Snypes – The Trials of Life (Radio Edits) (Lib004)
- Gutter Snypes – The Trials of Life EP (Lib005)
- Gutter Snypes – The Trials of Life (Instrumentals) (Lib006)
- Freestyle Frenzy Vol. 1 LP (Lib007)
- Freestyle Frenzy Vol. 2 LP (Lib008)
- Akinyele – "Break A Bitch Neck" / "You Gotta Go Down" (Lib009)
- DJ Noize – The Whole Mess EP (Lib010)
- DJ Noize – The Whole Mess II (Lib011)
- "Freestyle Frenzy Vol. 2" / "Akinyele Extract" 7" (Libext1)
