= RNA of unknown function =

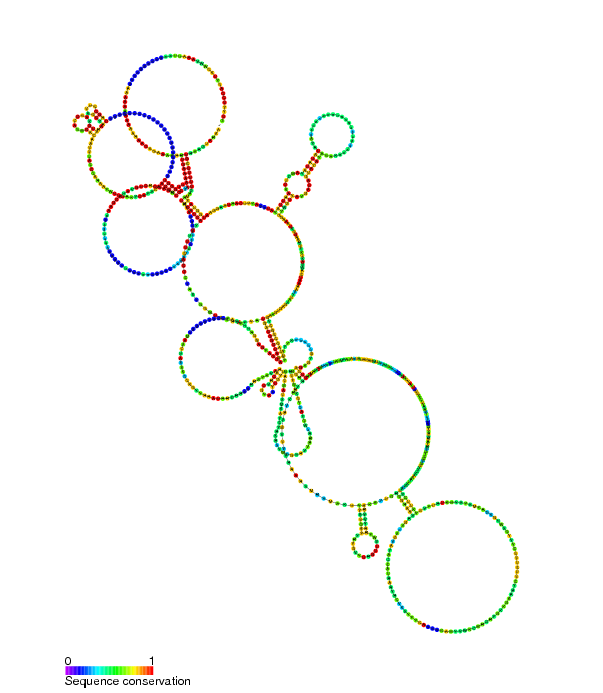
Secondary structure of RUF21, an RNA of unknown function from S. cerevisiae

RNA of unknown function (RUF) is a generic name, often appended with a numeric identifier, for a non-coding RNA molecule which has been partially characterised or predicted but the biological function has yet to be determined. The same convention is used for proteins, they can be named domains of unknown function (DUFs).

Examples of RUFs include:

- RUF1–8 found in Saccharomyces cerevisiae, though three of these were later reclassified due to experimental errors
- RUF20–23 also from S. cerevisiae
- RUF1–6 found in Plasmodium falciparum in 2007
