= Newtrament =

Newtrament is a musician, MC and DJ known for releasing an early UK electro/hip hop record – "London Bridge is Falling Down" – on Jive Records. It was based on the nursery rhyme (previously adapted by the reggae group Culture) with a political message that electoral politics were a sham.

== Discography ==
- "London Bridge Is Falling Down" (Jive Records), 12", 1983
