= Rizzle Kicks discography =

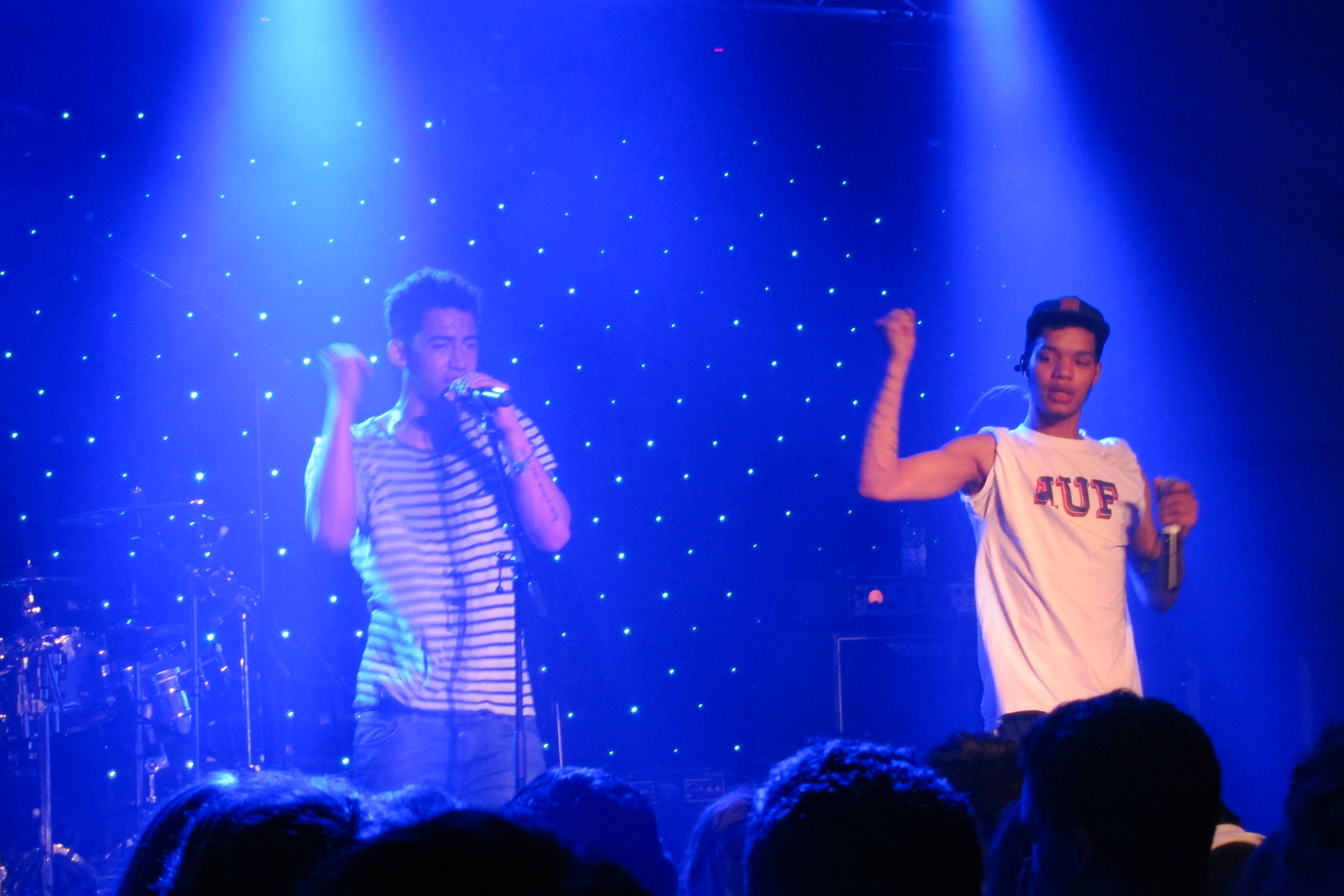
- Rizzle Kicks in concert at Jesus College May Ball, 2012
- Studio albums: 3
- Singles: 21
- Music videos: 16
- Remixes: 3
- Featured artist: 3

The discography of Rizzle Kicks, a British hip hop duo from Brighton, consisting of Jordan "Rizzle" Stephens and Harley "Sylvester" Alexander-Sule consists of three studio albums and twenty-one singles.

In June 2011, the duo released a promotional single, "Prophet (Better Watch It)" accompanied by a stop motion style video made up of 960 photographic stills. The track was initially offered as a free download, before being released on iTunes. Their first official single, "Down with the Trumpets", was released on 12 June 2011 in the manner of on air on sale, entering the UK Singles Chart at #84 and going on to eventually peak at #8 in September 2011. The single spent a total of 13 weeks in the Official Top 40. They featured on "Heart Skips a Beat" by Olly Murs, which was released on 21 August 2011, entering the chart at #1 on 28 August 2011. On 23 October, they released their second official single "When I Was a Youngster" which peaked at #8. The video features a cameo from Ed Sheeran. Their debut album Stereo Typical was released a week later on 31 October 2011, entering the chart at #9 and peaking at #5. Their third single "Mama Do the Hump" (produced by Norman Cook) was released on 16 December, peaking at #2 and has been certified platinum. The lo-fi video features a cameo from James Corden. Their fourth single "Traveller's Chant" was released on 8 April 2012. To date they have sold over 1 million singles and Stereo Typical was certified platinum in June 2012. On November 13 2026, it was announced a new album would be released named "WORLD WAR FREE".

== Albums ==
| Title | Album details | Peak chart positions | | | Certifications |
| Title | Album details | UK | IRE | SCO | Certifications |
|---|---|---|---|---|---|
| Stereo Typical | Released: 28 October 2011; Label: Universal Island; Format: CD, digital download, streaming | 5 | 34 | 13 | BPI: Platinum |
| Roaring 20s | Released: 2 September 2013; Label: Universal Island; Format: CD, digital download, streaming | 3 | 44 | 11 | BPI: Gold |
| Competition Is for Losers | Release date: 14 February 2025; Label: BMG; Format: CD, digital download, streaming | 59 | — | 33 | |

== Singles ==
=== As lead artist ===
| Title | Year | Peak chart positions | | | | Certifications | Album |
| Title | Year | UK | AUS | IRE | SCO | Certifications | Album |
|---|---|---|---|---|---|---|---|
| "Prophet (Better Watch It)" | 2011 | — | — | — | — | | Stereo Typical |
| "Down with the Trumpets" | 2011 | 8 | 52 | 29 | 9 | BPI: Platinum | Stereo Typical |
| "When I Was a Youngster" | 2011 | 8 | — | 41 | 11 | BPI: Silver | Stereo Typical |
| "Mama Do the Hump" | 2011 | 2 | 56 | 3 | 3 | BPI: Platinum | Stereo Typical |
| "Traveller's Chant" | 2012 | 44 | — | — | — | | Stereo Typical |
| "Dreamers" | 2012 | 105 | — | — | — | | Stereo Typical |
| "Lost Generation" | 2013 | 6 | — | 61 | 7 | BPI: Silver | Roaring 20s |
| "Skip to the Good Bit" | 2013 | 16 | — | 38 | 16 | BPI: Gold | Roaring 20s |
| "Happy That You're Here" | 2013 | — | — | — | — | | Roaring 20s |
| "Tell Her" | 2014 | 14 | — | — | 10 | | Non-album singles |
| "Always Late" | 2016 | — | — | — | — | | Non-album singles |
| "Cooler Than This" | 2016 | — | — | — | — | | Non-album singles |
| "Slurp!" | 2016 | — | — | — | — | | Non-album singles |
| "Javelin" | 2024 | — | — | — | — | | Competition Is for Losers |
| "Gumdrops" | 2024 | — | — | — | — | | Competition Is for Losers |
| "New Sport" | 2024 | — | — | — | — | | Competition Is for Losers |
| "Vice" | 2025 | — | — | — | — | | Competition Is for Losers |
| "Follow Excitement" (featuring Rachel Chinouriri) | 2025 | — | — | — | — | | Non-album singles |
| "Time Alone" | 2025 | — | — | — | — | | Non-album singles |
| "Livin' the Dream" | 2026 | — | — | — | — | | Non-album singles |
| "Slip" | 2026 | — | — | — | — | | Non-album singles |
| "Chillin' With Tigers" | 2026 | — | — | — | — | | Non-album singles |
"—" denotes single that did not chart or was not released.

=== As featured artist ===
| Title | Year | Peak chart positions | | | | Album |
| Title | Year | UK | IRE | SCO | SWI | Album |
|---|---|---|---|---|---|---|
| "Heart Skips a Beat" (Olly Murs featuring Rizzle Kicks) | 2011 | 1 | 6 | 2 | 1 | In Case You Didn't Know |
| "Teardrop" (among The Collective with Wretch 32, Ed Sheeran, Labrinth, Tulisa, Tinchy Stryder, Ms. Dynamite, Chipmunk, Mz Bratt and Dot Rotten) | 2011 | 24 | — | 30 | — | We Are the Collective |
| "German Whip" (Meridian Dan featuring Skepta, Bossman Birdie, Professor Green & Rizzle Kicks) | 2014 | — | — | — | — | German Whip (Remixes) EP |
"—" denotes single that did not chart or was not released

== Guest appearances ==
| Title | Year | Album |
|---|---|---|
| "The Walk" (Mayer Hawthorne featuring Rizzle Kicks) | 2012 | How Do You Do |
| "Skyhighatrist" (DJ Fresh featuring Rizzle Kicks) | 2012 | Nextlevelism |
| "Work" (Mikill Pane featuring Rizzle Kicks) | 2012 | Dirty Rider EP |
| "Name in Lights" (Professor Green featuring Rizzle Kicks) | 2014 | Growing Up in Public |

== Music videos ==
=== As lead artist ===
| Title | Year | Director |
|---|---|---|
| "Miss Cigarette" | 2010 | Toby Lockerbie |
| "Prophet (Better Watch It)" | 2011 | Toby Lockerbie |
| "Down with the Trumpets" | 2011 | Toby Lockerbie |
| "When I Was a Youngster" | 2011 | Toby Lockerbie |
| "Stop with the Chatter" | 2011 | Toby Lockerbie |
| "Mama Do the Hump" | 2011 | Jordan Stephens |
| "Traveller's Chant" | 2012 | Toby Lockerbie |
| "Even on a Rainy Day" | 2012 | Toby Lockerbie |
| "Tell Her" | 2014 | The Lennox Bros |
| "Always Late" | 2016 | Toby Lockerbie |
| "Everyone's Dead" | 2016 | Toby Lockerbie |
| "Cooler Than This" | 2016 | Toby Lockerbie |
| "Slurp!" | 2016 | Dom Joly |
| "Javelin" | 2024 | Lauren Luxenberg |
| "New Sport" | 2024 | Earthboi |
| "Vice" | 2025 | Yigit Karaca |

=== As featured artist ===
| Title | Year | Director |
|---|---|---|
| "Price Tag" (Rizzle Kicks vs. Rural Remix) | 2011 | Toby Lockerbie |
| "Heart Skips a Beat" | 2011 | Corin Hardy |
| "You Need Me, I Don't Need You" (Rizzle Kicks Remix) | 2011 | Toby Lockerbie |
| "Call It What You Want" (Rizzle Kicks Remix) | 2011 | Toby Lockerbie |
| "The Walk" (Mayer Hawthorne featuring Rizzle Kicks) | 2012 | Toby Lockerbie |
