= Jordan Stephens =

British musician (born 1992)

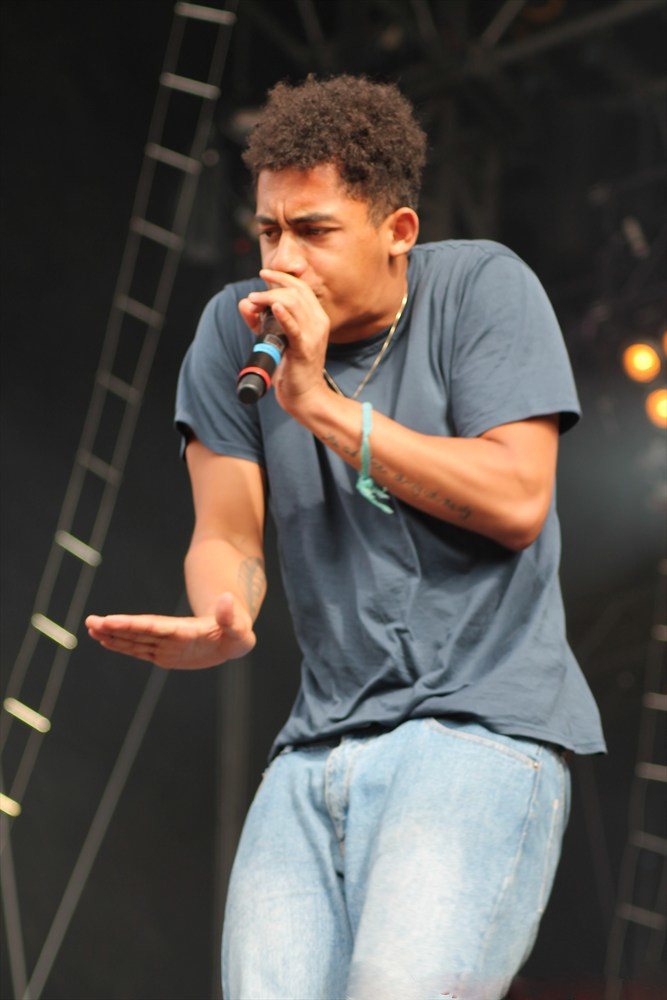
- Stephens at V Festival in 2012

Background information
- Also known as: Rizzle; Wildwood; Al, the Native; Gnarly Ventura
- Born: Jordan Fontenelle Stephens; 25 January 1992 (age 34); Neasden, London, England
- Genres: British hip-hop; alternative hip-hop; pop rap; UK garage
- Occupations: Musician; rapper; actor; writer
- Years active: 2008–present
- Member of: Rizzle Kicks
- Partner: Jade Thirlwall (2020–2026)
- Website: www.planetjordan.uk

Jordan Fontenelle Stephens (born 25 January 1992) is an English musician, rapper and actor. He is best known for being one half of Rizzle Kicks, and for presenting the ITV2 panel show Don't Hate the Playaz.

Stephens met Harley Alexander-Sule when he was four, with whom he founded Rizzle Kicks, which released eight UK Singles Chart and two UK Albums Chart entries. He has also released solo music under the aliases Rizzle, Wildhood, Al, the Native, and Gnarly Ventura, and in his own name.

As an actor, he has appeared in the TV series Glue, Uncle, Drunk History, Catastrophe, Feel Good and the films Alleycats, Access All Areas, Rogue One, Teen Spirit, Tucked, and The Ex-Wife, and as himself, he has appeared in several unscripted reality shows, including Don't Hate the Playaz, which he presents.

== Life and career ==
=== Early life and Rizzle Kicks ===
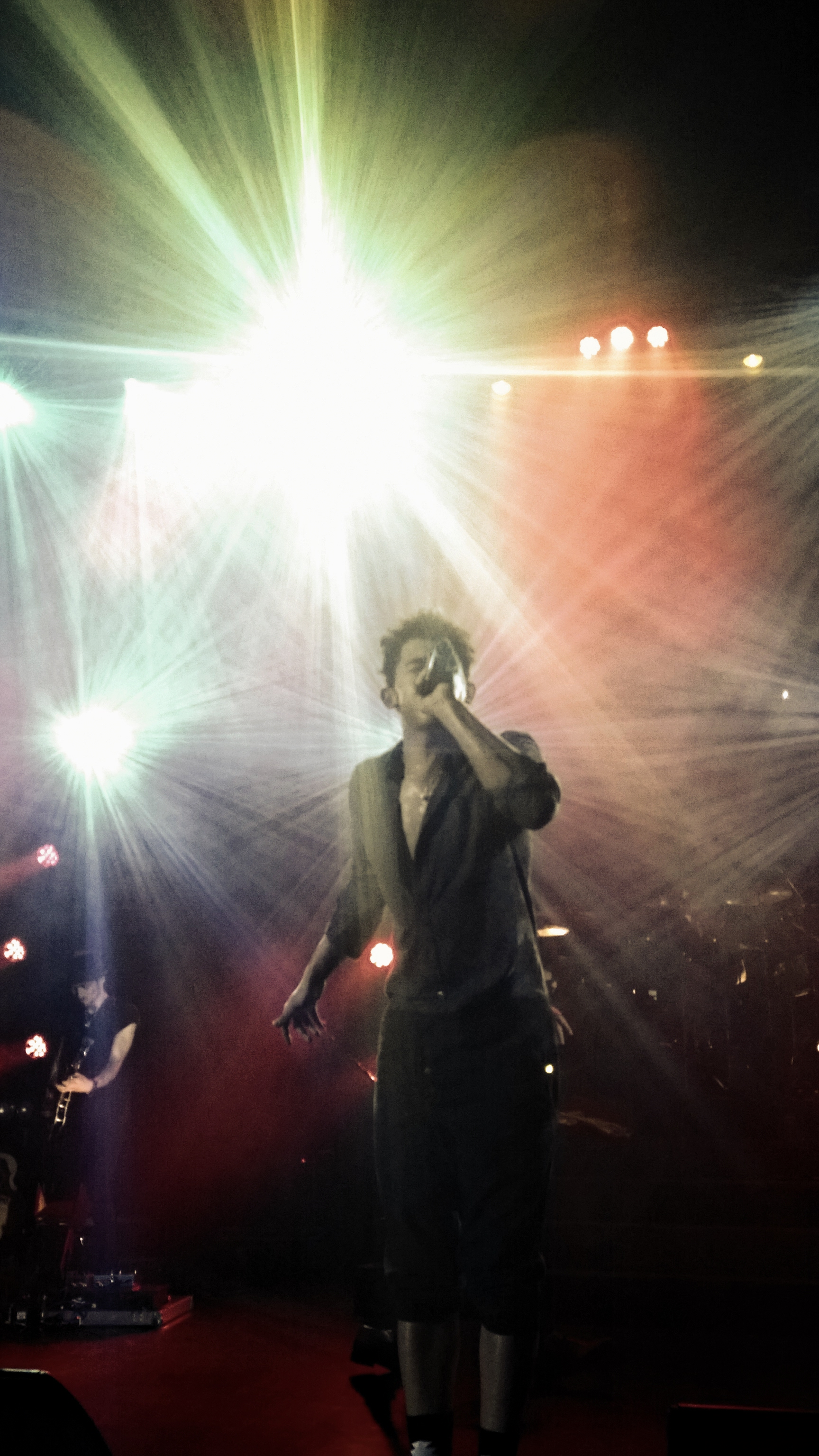
Stephens at Hammersmith Apollo

Stephens was born Jordan Fontenelle Stephens on 25 January 1992 to Herman Stephens and Emma Boulting, the daughter of John Boulting. He is of Guyanese descent through his father. He grew up in a council estate in Neasden, London, before moving when he was ten years old to Brighton, Sussex, where he attended Blatchington Mill School. He met Harley Alexander-Sule when he was four, lost contact, and met him again when he was eleven whilst at a Sunday league football match. They both attended the same Hip Hop Foundation project at AudioActive, a Brighton-based charity, and both attended BRIT School, with Stephens taking broadcasting and digital communication; he told a September 2022 The Guardian article that he took the subject after being advised by the principal that the entry standard for music was such that those that did not play at least two instruments need not apply.

He and Alexander-Sule formed Rizzle Kicks in 2008 after Stephens asked Alexander-Sule to sing on his mixtape 'Minor Breaches of Discipline'; Stephens had acquired the nickname "Green Rizla" at school after being accused of being part of a crew with that name, with that nickname later evolving into "Rizzle", and the "Kicks" part of the name coming from them both having just played a game of football. Stephens used the alias "Rizzle" when featuring on Hint's 2008 album Driven from Distraction on "Muddled Morning". Between 2011 and 2014, Rizzle Kicks released eight singles that entered the UK Singles Chart ("Down with the Trumpets", "Heart Skips a Beat", "When I Was a Youngster", "Mama Do the Hump", "Traveller's Chant", "Lost Generation", "Skip to the Good Bit", and "Tell Her"), and two albums that entered the UK Albums Chart (Stereo Typical and Roaring 20s).

=== Solo music career ===
Stephens has released solo music under his own name and others, having used the pseudonyms "J Steezy", "Rizzle", "Wildhood", "Gnarly Ventura", and "Al, the Native". As "Gnarly Ventura", he featured on "Check" by Mikill Pane in 2013. The following year, he featured on the remix of Meridian Dan's "German Whip", which was released on 13 April, and for which Stephens was credited as Rizzle Kicks. As "Wildhood", he released the 2015 singles "Double Dark" on 8 July and "Psycho Jam" on 30 October, both of which featured on his extended play Vert on 16 March 2016.

On 26 February 2016, under his own name, he appeared on Mikill Pane's album track "Hold My Crown" featuring Doc Brown, from "Let MC It". In July 2016, Stephens uploaded "SLBK" featuring Thunderbird Gerard to his Facebook page; its music video was compiled from old home recordings and footage taken at a Black Lives Matter march he attended earlier that month. The following October, he released the music video "Whole" in 2016, which was used to front the NHS-YMCA collaboration Whole. As "Al, the Native", he featured on 7 April 2017's "Drumroll Please" by The Last Skeptik featuring Scrufizzer, Mikill Pane and Dream Mclean; The following year, that alias released "The System" on 16 February, "Light of Day" featuring Dizraeli and Manifest on 20 April, "Animals" on 18 May, and "Funfair" on 30 November.

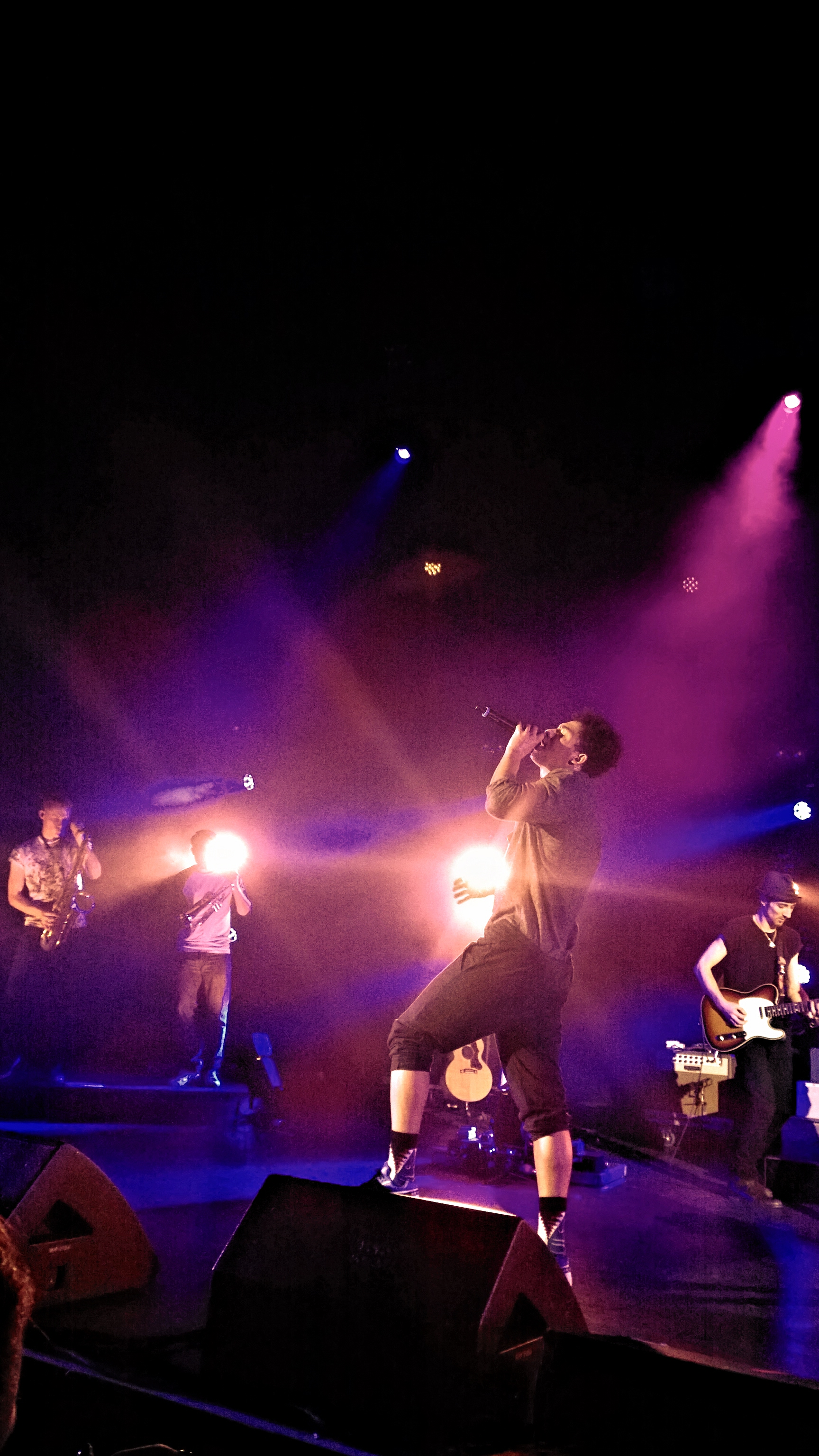
Stephens at Hammersmith Apollo

Under his own name, he released the singles "FOUND IN SPACE" on 20 September 2019 and "SHADOW LOVE" on 4 October 2019, both of which later appeared on his 25 October 2019 extended play "P.I.G." (Pain Is Good). He then released the singles "Son Of A Gun" on 28 May 2020, "Sunshine Skin" on 16 July 2020, "Wicked" on 30 July 2021, "Star" on 4 October 2021, "Shake!" on 3 December 2021, and "Big Bad Mood" featuring Miraa May on 14 January 2022, all of which later appeared on his 11 February 2022 album "Let Me Die Inside You". On 28 July 2022, again using his own name, he featured on United Freedom Collective's "1994"; on 18 August that year, his and Lazy Habits released a remix of Joshua Idehen's "Don't You Give Up On Me", and on 24 November 2022, he released one further single, "TELL THE TRUTH!".

=== Media career ===
On 15 November 2013, he appeared on 8 Out of 10 Cats; he would make two subsequent appearances on 4 July 2017 and 28 January 2020. On 2 January 2014, he appeared on Celebrity Mastermind, taking the life and times of Ross Geller; he came third. Later that year, Stephens played Rob in the E4 drama series Glue; its cast promoted the show with a 26 September 2014 appearance on Chatty Man. In February 2015, he appeared in Uncle as Hugo, a sound engineer.

On 21 February 2016, he appeared on Let's Play Darts; he lost to Greg Davies. That April, Stephens appeared as a Norman soldier in Drunk History, and that June, he appeared in Alleycats. In December 2016, Stephens appeared as Corporal Tonc, a Rebel soldier in Rogue One: A Star Wars Story, on 29 December 2016, he appeared on Robot Wars; his robot Dee, a pink axlebot made in collaboration with the Terrorhurtz drivers, lost two of its fights by knockout but won the third by a split decision. On 17 January 2017, he appeared on Virtually Famous, and in March 2017, he appeared as Rafe in Catastrophe. On 30 June 2017, he appeared in Access All Areas. In August and September 2017, he appeared in three episodes of Celebrity Island with Bear Grylls.

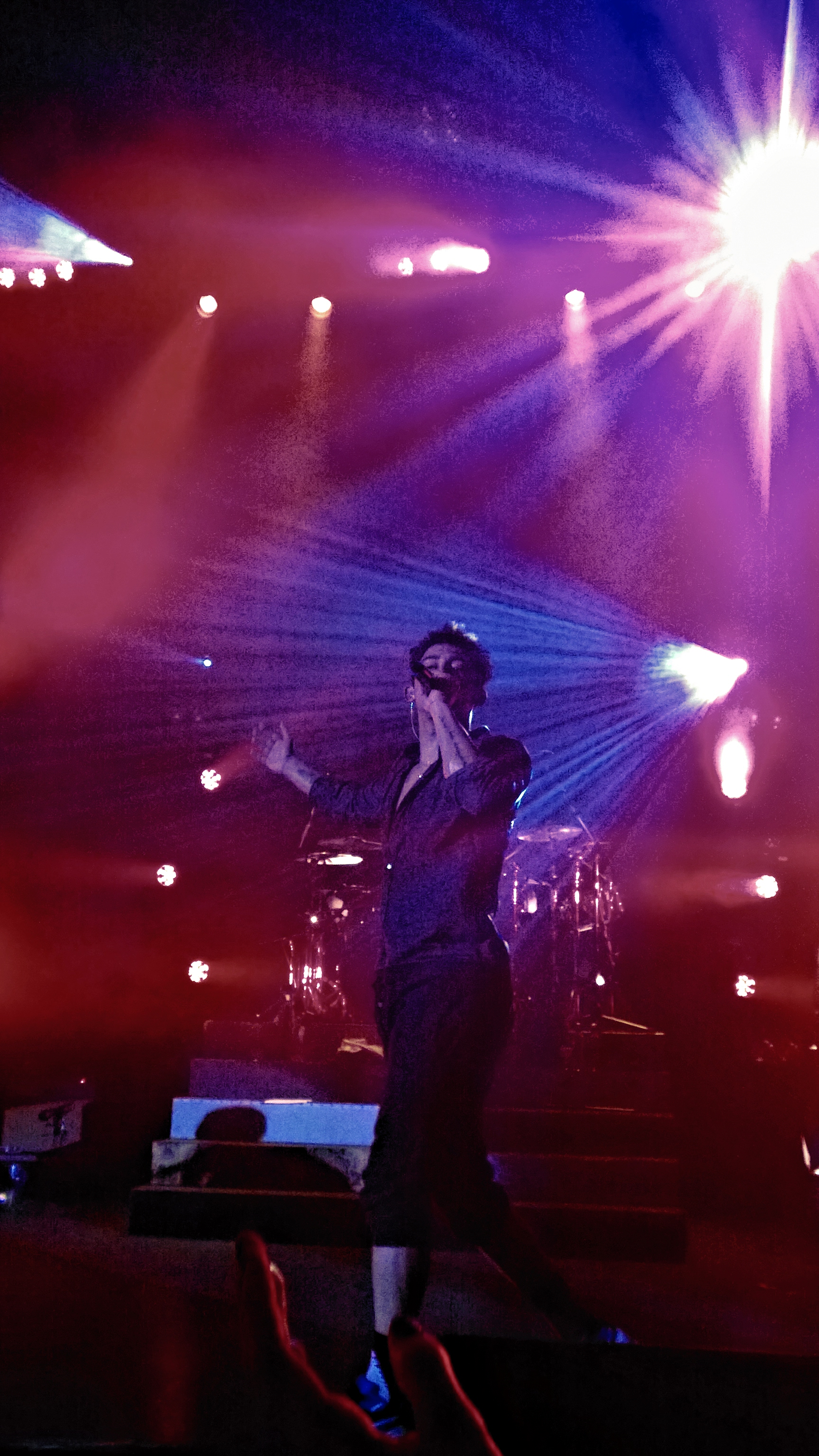
Stephens at Hammersmith Apollo

In 2018, Stephens appeared on a 12 January episode of Would I Lie to You?, a 5 May episode of Harry Hill's Alien Fun Capsule, and five episodes of House of Games broadcast between 28 May and 1 June. In August and September 2018, Stephens appeared in BBC Two's "Eight Go Rallying: The Road to Saigon". On 7 September 2018, Stephens played Rollo in Teen Spirit at the Toronto International Film Festival; the film saw theatrical release the following April.

On 11 October 2018, Stephens began presenting Don't Hate the Playaz, an ITV2 panel show which on first broadcast drew comparisons with Never Mind the Buzzcocks, on which Stephens had twice appeared as half of Rizzle Kicks; first in December 2011 as guests, and then on 4 November 2013 as hosts on an episode infamous for Huey Morgan losing his temper and throwing his coffee mug at the table. The following day, he appeared on Any Questions' seventieth anniversary edition. On 8 November 2018, he appeared on an episode of Celebrity Juice. In 2019, Stephens starred alongside Derren Nesbitt in Tucked, a film about a young drag queen taken in by an older drag queen who is dying of cancer.

In February 2020, he appeared in an episode of Roast Battle, winning his battle. On 9 October 2020, he presented "The Whole Truth" for Channel 4, a conversation with Arlo Parks, Che Lingo, and Kojey Radical. In December 2020, Stephens appeared on a celebrity edition of The Crystal Maze. On 1 March 2021, he appeared as an ensemble actor in The Stand Up Sketch Show, and on 4 June that year, he had a recurring role in the second series of Mae Martin's sitcom Feel Good on Netflix, appearing in four episodes. On 21 February 2022, Stephens appeared on Starstruck as Felix, and later that year, he played Sam in The Ex-Wife. That November, he appeared on The Big Narstie Show.

In August 2024, Stephens released his autobiography, Avoidance, Drugs, Heartbreak & Dogs. From 2024 until 2025, Stephens was a rotating panellist on Love Island: Aftersun.

== Personal life ==
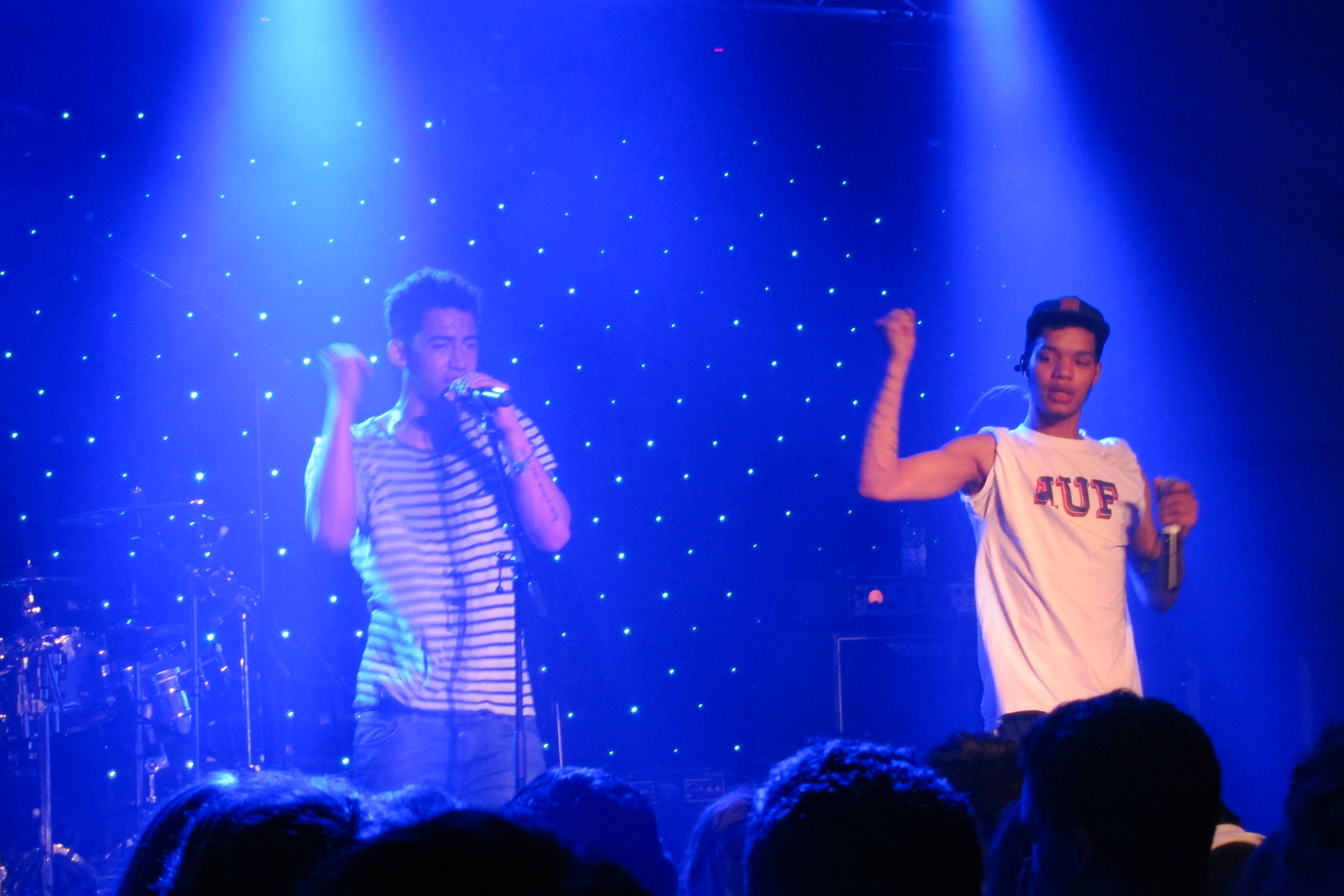
Rizzle Kicks at Jesus College, Cambridge

Stephens was diagnosed with ADHD when he was fifteen, and then again as an adult by a Harley Street doctor. He used an August 2022 appearance on Fearne Cotton's "Happy Place" podcast to detail further struggles with body dysmorphia, anxiety, and drug addiction, which he suffered with towards the end of his time with Rizzle Kicks, and throughout the making of Vert as a consequence of depression, which was triggered by the death of his grandmother and the suicide of a close friend. His drug use included alcohol, "non-prescription ADHD medication", cocaine, and LSD; he attracted tabloid headlines in 2014 after using his Twitter account to enquire as to whether "anyone in London [could] help [him] get hold of any acid".

He was in a relationship with Jade Thirlwall from 2020 to 2026; they met in lockdown via Zoom, and confirmed their relationship later that year after being spotted at a Black Trans Lives Matter rally in London. Stephens confirmed their split on his Miss Me? podcast in July 2026, after speculation from the press.

Stephens has been open about his experiences of racism, telling the Evening Standard in July 2016 that he had joined a Black Lives Matter march earlier that month in Westminster, and that "I’ve had brushes with the police and they’ve assumed a lot about me". In February 2021, Stephens was among one hundred public figures to sign an open letter to the BBC, organised by Yassmin Abdel-Magied and Mariam Khan, criticising what they called Emma Barnett's "strikingly hostile" interview of Zara Mohammed, the first woman and youngest person to be elected Secretary General of the Muslim Council of Britain, and saying that her line of questioning perpetuated "damaging and prejudicial tropes" about Islam and Muslim women.
