= List of UK top-ten singles in 2011 =

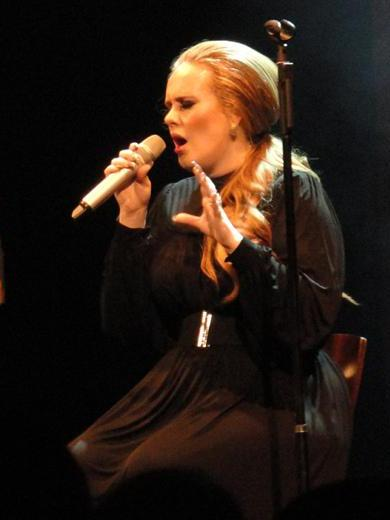
Adele had a total of three singles in the top 10 in 2011, including the year's best-selling single, "Someone like You", which spent five weeks at number-one and lasted nine weeks in the top 10.

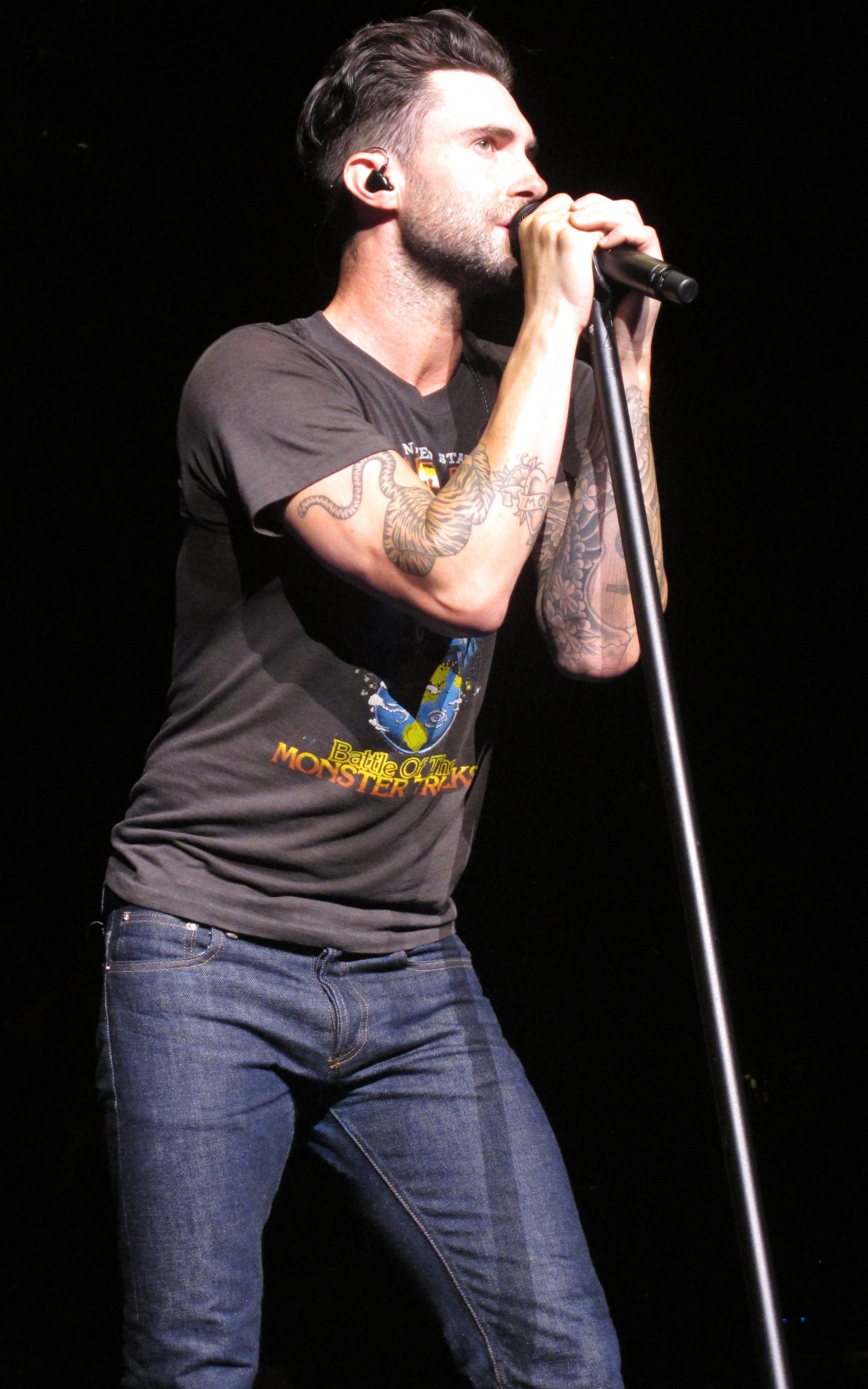
Adam Levine and his group Maroon 5 scored a major comeback hit this year with "Moves Like Jagger". The song, a collaboration with Christina Aguilera, became the UK's second best seller of the year, with 16 consecutive weeks in the top 10, including seven straight weeks at number two. It is the highest-selling song not to peak at number-one in the UK, with over 1.5 million copies sold there.

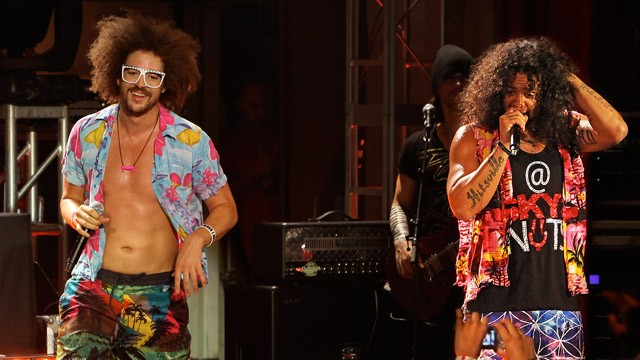
American electronic dance music duo LMFAO achieved the third best selling single of 2011 with "Party Rock Anthem". The record spent four straight weeks at number-one in the UK and lasted 12 weeks in the top 10. It went on to sell over 1.2 million copies in the UK alone.

The UK Singles Chart is one of many music charts compiled by the Official Charts Company that calculates the best-selling singles of the week in the United Kingdom. Since 2004 the chart has been based on the sales of both physical singles and digital downloads, with airplay figures excluded from the official chart. This list shows singles that peaked in the Top 10 of the UK Singles Chart during 2011, as well as singles which peaked in 2010 and 2012 but were in the top 10 in 2011. The entry date is when the song appeared in the top 10 for the first time (week ending, as published by the Official Charts Company, which is six days after the chart is announced).

One-hundred and thirty-eight singles were in the top ten in 2011. Twelve singles from 2010 remained in the top 10 for several weeks at the beginning of the year, "Good Feeling" by Flo Rida and "Paradise" by Coldplay were released in 2011 but did not reach their peak until 2012. "What's My Name?" by Rihanna featuring Drake and "Who's That Chick" by David Guetta featuring Rihanna were the singles from 2010 to reach their peak in 2011. Fifty-one artists scored multiple entries in the top 10 in 2011. Christina Perri, Ed Sheeran, Jessie J, Little Mix and Rizzle Kicks were among the many artists who achieved their first UK charting top 10 single in 2011.

According to figures released by the Official Charts Company, 2011 saw the biggest amount of single sales since 2004, with around 178 million singles being purchased.

The 2010 Christmas number-one, "When We Collide" by X Factor series 7 winner Matt Cardle, remained at number-one for the first two weeks of 2011. The first new number-one single of the year was "What's My Name?" by Rihanna featuring Drake. Overall, thirty-one different singles peaked at number-one in 2011, with Rihanna, Pitbull, Olly Murs, Example and Bruno Mars (2) having the joint most singles hit that position.

== Background ==
=== Multiple entries ===
One-hundred and thirty-eight singles charted in the top 10 in 2011, with one-hundred and twenty-six singles reaching their peak this year.

Fifty-one artists scored multiple entries in the top 10 in 2011. Rihanna secured the record for most top 10 hits in 2011 with seven hit singles. Her total included the number-one singles "Only Girl (In the World)", What's My Name?" (featuring Drake) and "We Found Love" with Calvin Harris. "We Found Love" spent the longest time at number one in 2011, with six weeks on top of the charts. David Guetta's five top 10 singles included collaborations with Flo Rida and Nicki Minaj on "Where Them Girls At" and "Sweat" featuring Snoop Dogg. Jessie J and JLS both had four top ten singles in 2011.

=== Chart debuts ===
Fifty-eight artists achieved their first top 10 single in 2011, either as a lead or featured artist. Of these, five went on to record another hit single that year: Avicii, Little Mix, Nero, Skylar Grey and Wiz Khalifa. Ed Sheeran, Rizzle Kicks and Wretch 32 all scored two more top 10 singles in 2011. Jessie J had three other entries in her breakthrough year.

The following table (collapsed on desktop site) does not include acts who had previously charted as part of a group and secured their first top 10 solo single.

Artist	Number of top 10s	First entry	Chart position	Other entries
Jessie J	4	"Do It like a Dude"	2	"Price Tag" (1), "Nobody's Perfect" (9), "Who You Are" (8)
Diddy – Dirty Money	1	"Coming Home"	4	—
Skylar Grey	2	"Traktor"	4	"I Need a Doctor" (8)
Wretch 32	3	"Traktor"	4	"Unorthodox" (2), "Don't Go" (1)
L Marshall	1	"Traktor"	4	—
Liam Bailey	1	"Blind Faith"	5	—
DJ Frank E	1	"Tonight (I'm Lovin' You)"	5	—
Wiz Khalifa	2	"Black and Yellow"	5	"5 O'Clock" (6)
Parade	1	"Louder"	10	—
Lauren Bennett	1	"Party Rock Anthem"	1	—
GoonRock	1	"Party Rock Anthem"	1	—
Mann	1	"Buzzin'"	6	—
Nero	2	"Guilt"	8	"Promises" (1)
Aloe Blacc	1	"I Need a Dollar"	2	—
Afrojack	1	"Give Me Everything"	1	—
Nayer	1	"Give Me Everything"	1	—
Alexandra Stan	1	"Mr. Saxobeat"	3	—
Ed Sheeran	3	"The A Team"	3	"You Need Me, I Don't Need You" (4), "Lego House" (5)
Vato Gonzalez	1	"Badman Riddim (Jump)"	7	—
Foreign Beggars	1	"Badman Riddim (Jump)"	7	—
DJ Fresh	1	"Louder"	1	—
Sian Evans	1	"Louder"	1	—
Loick Essien	1	"How We Roll"	2	—
Tanya Lacey	1	"How We Roll"	2	—
Rizzle Kicks	3	"Down with the Trumpets"	8	"Heart Skips a Beat" (1), "When I Was a Youngster" (8)
Christina Perri	1	"Jar of Hearts"	4	—
Josh Kumra	1	"Don't Go"	1	—
Cover Drive	1	"Lick Ya Down"	9	—
Avicii	2	"Collide"	4	"Levels" (4)
Damien Rice	1	"Cannonball"	9	—
Sak Noel	1	"Loca People"	1	—
Goo Goo Dolls	1	"Iris"	3	—
Bad Meets Evil	1	"Lighters"	10	—
Charlene Soraia	1	"Wherever You Will Go"	3	—
Lana Del Rey	1	"Video Games"	9	—
Pusha T	1	"What Do You Take Me For?"	10	—
The WAV.s	1	"Down for Whatever"	6	—
The X Factor Finalists 2011	1	"Wishing on a Star"	1	—
2 Shoes	1	"Wishing on a Star"	1	—
Amelia Lily	1	"Wishing on a Star"	1	—
Craig Colton	1	"Wishing on a Star"	1	—
Frankie Cocozza	1	"Wishing on a Star"	1	—
James Michael	1	"Wishing on a Star"	1	—
Janet Devlin	1	"Wishing on a Star"	1	—
Johnny Robinson	1	"Wishing on a Star"	1	—
Jonjo Kerr	1	"Wishing on a Star"	1	—
Kitty Brucknell	1	"Wishing on a Star"	1	—
Little Mix	2	"Wishing on a Star"	1	"Cannonball" (1)
Marcus Collins	1	"Wishing on a Star"	1	—
Misha B	1	"Wishing on a Star"	1	—
Nu Vibe	1	"Wishing on a Star"	1	—
The Risk	1	"Wishing on a Star"	1	—
Sami Brookes	1	"Wishing on a Star"	1	—
Sophie Habibis	1	"Wishing on a Star"	1	—
Military Wives	1	"Wherever You Are"	1	—
Gareth Malone	1	"Wherever You Are"	1	—
Lou Monte	1	"Dominick the Donkey"	3	—
Alex Day	1	"Forever Yours"	4	—

Notes

Cher Lloyd, One Direction and Rebecca Ferguson all featured on The X Factor finalists number-one charity single, a cover of David Bowie's "Heroes", at the end of 2010 before all went on to make their top 10 debut this year in their own right. Cher Lloyd's "Swagger Jagger" and One Direction's "What Makes You Beautiful" both topped the chart, while Rebecca Ferguson's "Nothing's Real But Love" made number ten.

Diddy – Dirty Money was a duo which included Diddy (real name Sean Combs, variously known as P Diddy, Diddy or Puff Daddy). Kimberley Walsh found fame in the line-up of Girls Aloud, who were formed on the talent show Popstars: The Rivals in 2002. After years of number-one singles, she guested on "Like U Like" by Aggro Santos for her first credit under her own name.

Dappy had several top 10 singles with his group N-Dubz but 2011 saw him go it alone with two entries, including chart-topper "No Regrets" and collaboration "Spaceship" with Tinchy Stryder. Bad Meets Evil was formed by Eminem (whose haul of top 10 singles included 7 number-ones) and Royce da 5'9".

=== Songs from films ===
Original songs from various films entered the top 10 throughout the year. These included "Iris" (from City of Angels, a re-entry due to the song's performance on The X Factor).

=== Best-selling singles ===
Adele had the best-selling single of the year with "Someone Like You". The song spent nine weeks in the top 10 (including five weeks at number one), sold over 1.24 million copies and was certified 3× platinum by the BPI (July 2013). "Moves Like Jagger" by Maroon 5 featuring Christina Aguilera came in second place, selling more than 1.04 million copies and losing out by around 200,000 sales. LMFAO featuring Lauren Bennett & GoonRock's "Party Rock Anthem, "Price Tag" from Jessie J featuring B.o.B, and "We Found Love" by Rihanna featuring Calvin Harris made up the top five. Singles by Pitbull featuring Ne-Yo, Afrojack & Nayer, Bruno Mars, Ed Sheeran, Adele ("Rolling in the Deep") and Jennifer Lopez featuring Pitbull were also in the top ten best-selling singles of the year.

== Top-ten singles ==
Key

Symbol	Meaning
‡	Single peaked in 2010 but still in chart in 2011.
♦	Single released in 2011 but peaked in 2012.
(#)	Year-end top-ten single position and rank
Entered	The date that the single first appeared in the chart.
Peak	Highest position that the single reached in the UK Singles Chart.

Entered (week ending)	Weeks in top 10	Single	Artist	Peak	Peak reached (week ending)	Weeks at peak
Singles in 2010
9 October 2010	4	"Make You Feel My Love" ‡ ^{[A]}	Adele	4	9 October 2010	1
30 October 2010	9	"Firework" ‡	Katy Perry	3	20 November 2010	1
6 November 2010	11	"Only Girl (In the World)" ‡	Rihanna	1	13 November 2010	2
20 November 2010	6	"The Flood" ‡	Take That	2	20 November 2010	2
27 November 2010	8	"Your Song" ‡	Ellie Goulding	2	4 December 2010	2
27 November 2010	8	"Like a G6" ‡	Far East Movement featuring The Cataracs & Dev	5	11 December 2010	1
27 November 2010	8	"The Time (Dirty Bit)" ‡	Black Eyed Peas	1	18 December 2010	1
4 December 2010	4	"Thinking of Me" ‡ ^{[B]}	Olly Murs	4	4 December 2010	2
4 December 2010	10	"What's My Name?"	Rihanna featuring Drake	1	15 January 2011	1
11 December 2010	4	"Who's That Chick?" ^{[C]}	David Guetta featuring Rihanna	6	22 January 2011	1
18 December 2010	4	"Whip My Hair" ‡	Willow	2	18 December 2010	1
25 December 2010	5	"When We Collide" ‡	Matt Cardle	1	25 December 2010	3
Singles in 2011
1 January 2011	4	"Lights On" ^{[D]}	Katy B featuring Ms. Dynamite	4	1 January 2011	3
15 January 2011	6	"Do It like a Dude" ^{[E]}	Jessie J	2	22 January 2011	1
22 January 2011	9	"Grenade" (#7)	Bruno Mars	1	22 January 2011	2
22 January 2011	3	"Eyes Wide Shut" ^{[F]}	JLS featuring Tinie Tempah	8	26 February 2011	1
29 January 2011	10	"Rolling in the Deep" (#9)	Adele	2	29 January 2011	1
29 January 2011	4	"Coming Home"	Diddy – Dirty Money featuring Skylar Grey	4	29 January 2011	2
29 January 2011	2	"Traktor"	Wretch 32 featuring L Marshall	5	29 January 2011	1
29 January 2011	2	"Hold It Against Me"	Britney Spears	6	29 January 2011	1
29 January 2011	1	"Like U Like"	Aggro Santos featuring Kimberley Walsh	8	29 January 2011	1
5 February 2011	3	"We R Who We R"	Kesha	1	5 February 2011	1
5 February 2011	2	"Blind Faith"	Chase & Status featuring Liam Bailey	5	5 February 2011	1
5 February 2011	7	"Yeah 3x"	Chris Brown	6	19 February 2011	2
12 February 2011	10	"Price Tag" (#4)	Jessie J featuring B.o.B	1	12 February 2011	2
12 February 2011	2	"Tonight (I'm Lovin' You)"	Enrique Iglesias featuring Ludacris & DJ Frank E	5	12 February 2011	1
12 February 2011	3	"Higher"	Taio Cruz featuring Kylie Minogue & Travie McCoy	8	12 February 2011	2
19 February 2011	5	"Champion"	Chipmunk featuring Chris Brown	2	19 February 2011	1
19 February 2011	7	"Born This Way"	Lady Gaga	3	19 February 2011	2
26 February 2011	9	"Someone Like You" (#1)	Adele	1	26 February 2011	5
26 February 2011	8	"S&M" ^{[G]}	Rihanna	3	5 March 2011	3
5 March 2011	3	"Good Girl"	Alexis Jordan	6	5 March 2011	1
5 March 2011	1	"F**kin' Perfect"	P!nk	10	5 March 2011	1
19 March 2011	5	"Black and Yellow"	Wiz Khalifa	5	19 March 2011	1
26 March 2011	5	"Don't Hold Your Breath"	Nicole Scherzinger	1	26 March 2011	1
26 March 2011	2	"Gold Forever" ^{[U]}	The Wanted	3	26 March 2011	1
26 March 2011	3	"I Need a Doctor"	Dr. Dre featuring Eminem & Skylar Grey	8	26 March 2011	1
26 March 2011	1	"Louder"	Parade	10	26 March 2011	1
2 April 2011	5	"Just Can't Get Enough"	Black Eyed Peas	3	2 April 2011	1
9 April 2011	8	"On the Floor" (#10)	Jennifer Lopez featuring Pitbull	1	9 April 2011	2
9 April 2011	12	"Party Rock Anthem" (#3)	LMFAO featuring Lauren Bennett & GoonRock	1	23 April 2011	4
9 April 2011	1	"Broken Record"	Katy B	8	9 April 2011	1
16 April 2011	5	"E.T."	Katy Perry featuring Kanye West	3	23 April 2011	1
16 April 2011	4	"Buzzin'"	Mann featuring 50 Cent	6	16 April 2011	1
16 April 2011	9	"Sweat"	Snoop Dogg vs. David Guetta	4	23 April 2011	1
23 April 2011	8	"Beautiful People"	Chris Brown featuring Benny Benassi	4	7 May 2011	2
30 April 2011	3	"Unorthodox"	Wretch 32 featuring Example	2	30 April 2011	1
30 April 2011	2	"Fast Car" ^{[H]}	Tracy Chapman	4	30 April 2011	1
30 April 2011	3	"Judas" ^{[I]}	Lady Gaga	8	28 May 2011	1
7 May 2011	7	"The Lazy Song"	Bruno Mars	1	21 May 2011	1
7 May 2011	1	"Guilt"	Nero	8	7 May 2011	1
14 May 2011	3	"Where Them Girls At"	David Guetta featuring Flo Rida & Nicki Minaj	3	14 May 2011	2
14 May 2011	2	"Nobody's Perfect"	Jessie J	9	14 May 2011	1
14 May 2011	8	"I Need a Dollar"	Aloe Blacc	2	11 June 2011	1
21 May 2011	12	"Give Me Everything" (#6)	Pitbull featuring Ne-Yo, Afrojack & Nayer	1	28 May 2011	3
21 May 2011	4	"The Edge of Glory" ^{[J]}	Lady Gaga	6	21 May 2011	2
4 June 2011	7	"Mr. Saxobeat"	Alexandra Stan	3	11 June 2011	1
4 June 2011	1	"Notorious"	The Saturdays	8	4 June 2011	1
4 June 2011	1	"Save the World"	Swedish House Mafia	10	4 June 2011	1
11 June 2011	1	"What a Feeling"	Alex Gaudino featuring Kelly Rowland	6	11 June 2011	1
11 June 2011	1	"California King Bed"	Rihanna	8	11 June 2011	1
11 June 2011	3	"I'm Into You"	Jennifer Lopez featuring Lil Wayne	9	18 June 2011	1
18 June 2011	7	"Changed the Way You Kiss Me"	Example	1	18 June 2011	2
18 June 2011	3	"Right There"	Nicole Scherzinger featuring 50 Cent	3	18 June 2011	1
18 June 2011	2	"Every Teardrop Is a Waterfall" ^{[K]}	Coldplay	6	18 June 2011	1
18 June 2011	1	"Bass Down Low"	Dev featuring The Cataracs	10	18 June 2011	1
25 June 2011	6	"Bounce"	Calvin Harris featuring Kelis	2	25 June 2011	1
25 June 2011	13	"The A Team" (#8) ^{[N]}	Ed Sheeran	3	25 June 2011	4
25 June 2011	1	"Spaceship"	Tinchy Stryder & Dappy	5	25 June 2011	1
2 July 2011	5	"Don't Wanna Go Home"	Jason Derulo	1	2 July 2011	2
2 July 2011	1	"Badman Riddim (Jump)"	Vato Gonzalez featuring Foreign Beggars	7	2 July 2011	1
9 July 2011	7	"Best Thing I Never Had"	Beyoncé	3	9 July 2011	1
9 July 2011	5	"Last Friday Night (T.G.I.F.)"	Katy Perry	9	9 July 2011	3
16 July 2011	6	"Louder"	DJ Fresh featuring Sian Evans	1	16 July 2011	1
16 July 2011	5	"How We Roll"	Loick Essien featuring Tanya Lacey	2	16 July 2011	1
23 July 2011	6	"Glad You Came"	The Wanted	1	23 July 2011	2
6 August 2011	4	"She Makes Me Wanna"	JLS featuring Dev	1	6 August 2011	1
6 August 2011	1	"Back to Black" ^{[L]}	Amy Winehouse	8	6 August 2011	1
6 August 2011	2	"Super Bass"	Nicki Minaj	8	13 August 2011	1
13 August 2011	2	"Swagger Jagger"	Cher Lloyd	1	13 August 2011	1
13 August 2011	4	"Little Bad Girl"	David Guetta featuring Taio Cruz & Ludacris	4	20 August 2011	1
13 August 2011	4	"Down with the Trumpets"	Rizzle Kicks	8	20 August 2011	3
20 August 2011	2	"Promises"	Nero	1	20 August 2011	1
20 August 2011	9	"Jar of Hearts" ^{[Q]}	Christina Perri	4	27 August 2011	2
27 August 2011	3	"Don't Go"	Wretch 32 featuring Josh Kumra	1	27 August 2011	1
27 August 2011	2	"Heaven"	Emeli Sandé	2	27 August 2011	1
27 August 2011	16	"Moves Like Jagger" (#2)	Maroon 5 featuring Christina Aguilera	2	10 September 2011	7
3 September 2011	6	"Heart Skips a Beat"	Olly Murs featuring Rizzle Kicks	1	3 September 2011	1
3 September 2011	4	"Feel So Close"	Calvin Harris	2	3 September 2011	1
3 September 2011	4	"Jealousy" ^{[M]}	Will Young	5	3 September 2011	1
10 September 2011	3	"Stay Awake"	Example	1	10 September 2011	1
10 September 2011	2	"You Need Me, I Don't Need You"	Ed Sheeran	4	10 September 2011	1
10 September 2011	1	"Lick Ya Down"	Cover Drive	9	10 September 2011	1
10 September 2011	2	"Party All Night (Sleep All Day)"	Sean Kingston	9	17 September 2011	1
17 September 2011	4	"All About Tonight"	Pixie Lott	1	17 September 2011	1
17 September 2011	2	"All Fired Up"	The Saturdays	3	17 September 2011	1
17 September 2011	2	"Collide"	Leona Lewis & Avicii	4	17 September 2011	1
24 September 2011	5	"What Makes You Beautiful"	One Direction	1	24 September 2011	1
1 October 2011	3	"No Regrets"	Dappy	1	1 October 2011	1
1 October 2011	3	"It Girl"	Jason Derulo	4	1 October 2011	1
1 October 2011	3	"I Won't Let You Go"	James Morrison	5	1 October 2011	1
1 October 2011	1	"Cannonball" ^{[O]}	Damien Rice	9	1 October 2011	1
8 October 2011	3	"Loca People"	Sak Noel	1	8 October 2011	1
8 October 2011	2	"Iris" ^{[P]}	Goo Goo Dolls	3	8 October 2011	1
8 October 2011	2	"Lighters"	Bad Meets Evil featuring Bruno Mars	10	8 October 2011	2
15 October 2011	14	"We Found Love" (#5)	Rihanna featuring Calvin Harris	1	15 October 2011	6
15 October 2011	7	"Sexy and I Know It"	LMFAO	5	15 October 2011	1
22 October 2011	3	"Stereo Hearts"	Gym Class Heroes featuring Adam Levine	3	22 October 2011	1
22 October 2011	1	"Run for Your Life"	Matt Cardle	6	22 October 2011	1
22 October 2011	4	"Wherever You Will Go"	Charlene Soraia	3	29 October 2011	1
29 October 2011	2	"Lightning"	The Wanted	2	29 October 2011	1
29 October 2011	3	"Mr. Know It All"	Kelly Clarkson	4	5 November 2011	1
29 October 2011	1	"Video Games"	Lana Del Rey	9	29 October 2011	1
29 October 2011	4	"Without You" ^{[R]}	David Guetta featuring Usher	6	26 November 2011	1
5 November 2011	4	"Read All About It"	Professor Green featuring Emeli Sandé	1	5 November 2011	2
5 November 2011	9	"Earthquake"	Labrinth featuring Tinie Tempah	2	5 November 2011	1
5 November 2011	1	"When I Was a Youngster"	Rizzle Kicks	8	5 November 2011	1
12 November 2011	2	"With Ur Love"	Cher Lloyd featuring Mike Posner	4	12 November 2011	1
12 November 2011	8	"Lego House"	Ed Sheeran	5	19 November 2011	2
19 November 2011	2	"Take a Chance on Me"	JLS	2	19 November 2011	1
19 November 2011	1	"What Do You Take Me For?"	Pixie Lott featuring Pusha T	10	19 November 2011	1
26 November 2011	11	"Good Feeling" ♦	Flo Rida	1	14 January 2012	1
26 November 2011	1	"Gotta Be You"	One Direction	3	26 November 2011	1
3 December 2011	8	"Dance with Me Tonight"	Olly Murs	1	17 December 2011	1
3 December 2011	8	"Levels"	Avicii	4	3 December 2011	2
3 December 2011	2	"Down for Whatever"	Kelly Rowland featuring The WAV.s	6	3 December 2011	1
3 December 2011	1	"Take Care"	Drake featuring Rihanna	9	3 December 2011	1
3 December 2011	1	"Nothing's Real but Love"	Rebecca Ferguson	10	3 December 2011	1
10 December 2011	2	"Wishing on a Star"	The X Factor Finalists 2011 featuring JLS & One Direction	1	10 December 2011	1
10 December 2011	2	"Who You Are"	Jessie J	8	10 December 2011	1
17 December 2011	6	"Dedication to My Ex (Miss That)"	Lloyd featuring André 3000 & Lil Wayne	3	17 December 2011	1
17 December 2011	2	"5 O'Clock"	T-Pain featuring Lily Allen & Wiz Khalifa	6	17 December 2011	1
17 December 2011	7	"Paradise" ♦	Coldplay	1	7 January 2012	1
24 December 2011	3	"Cannonball"	Little Mix	1	24 December 2011	1
24 December 2011	1	"Hurt"	Leona Lewis	8	24 December 2011	1
31 December 2011	2	"Wherever You Are"	Military Wives featuring Gareth Malone	1	31 December 2011	1
31 December 2011	1	"Dominick the Donkey"	Lou Monte	3	31 December 2011	1
31 December 2011	1	"Forever Yours"	Alex Day	4	31 December 2011	1

== Entries by artist ==
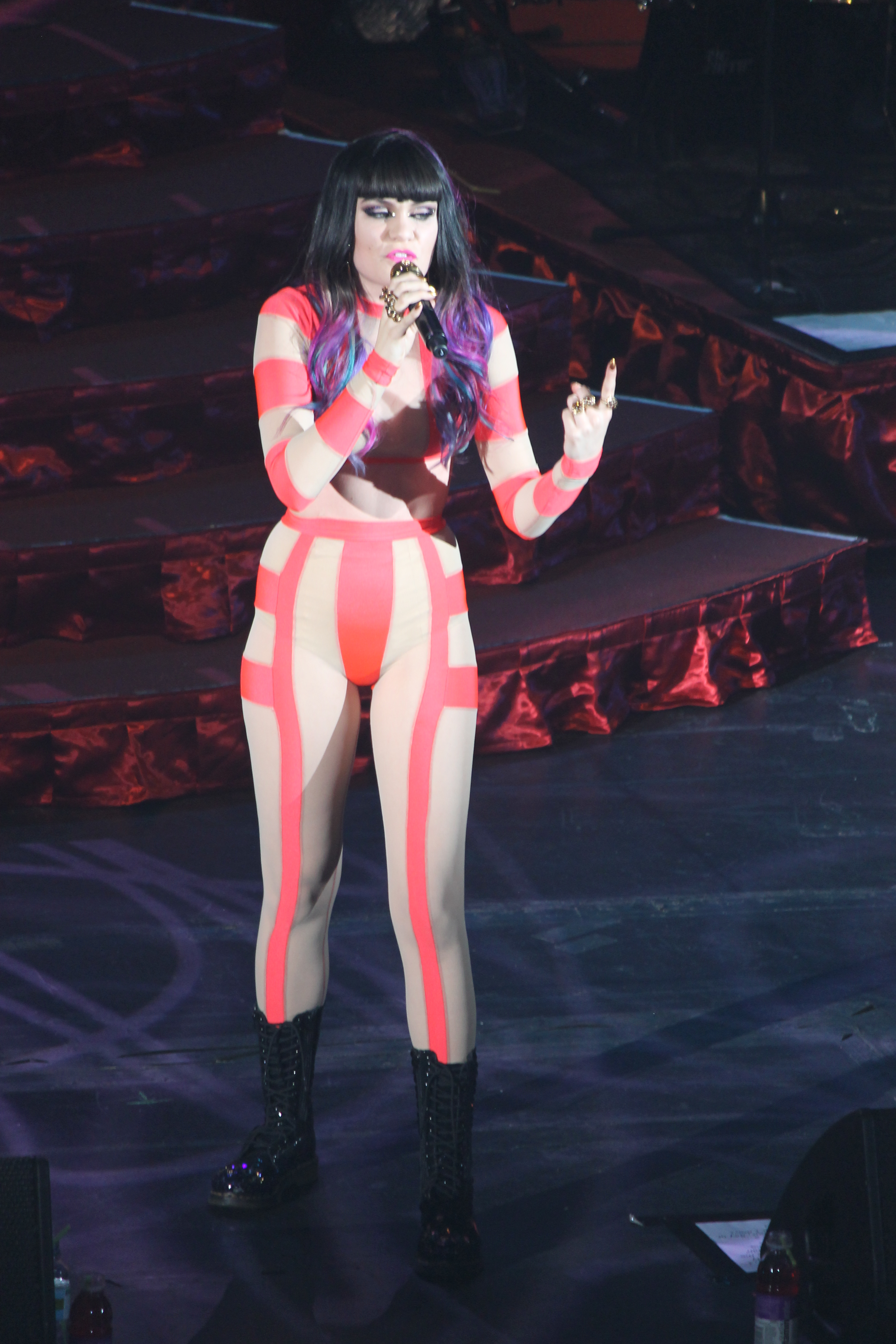
Jessie J made her UK top 10 debut this year, scoring four entries. The most successful of these was "Price Tag", featuring American rapper B.o.B, which reached number-one in February for two weeks and ended up as the UK's fourth best selling single of the year.

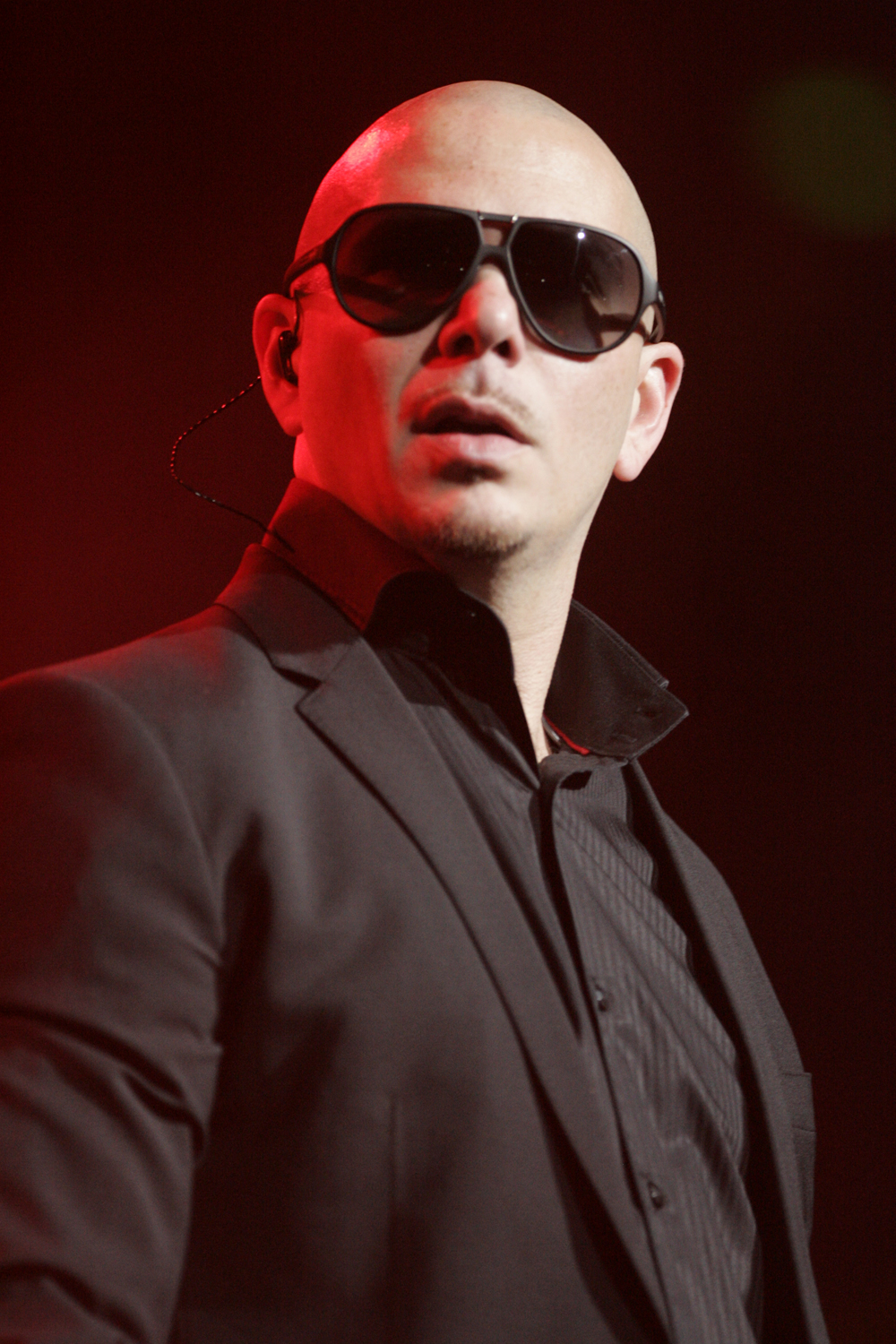
US rapper Pitbull achieved two UK top 10 entries in 2011, both of which peaked at number-one. "On the Floor" was a collaboration with Jennifer Lopez, while "Give Me Everything" was a collaboration with Ne-Yo, Afrojack and Nayer.

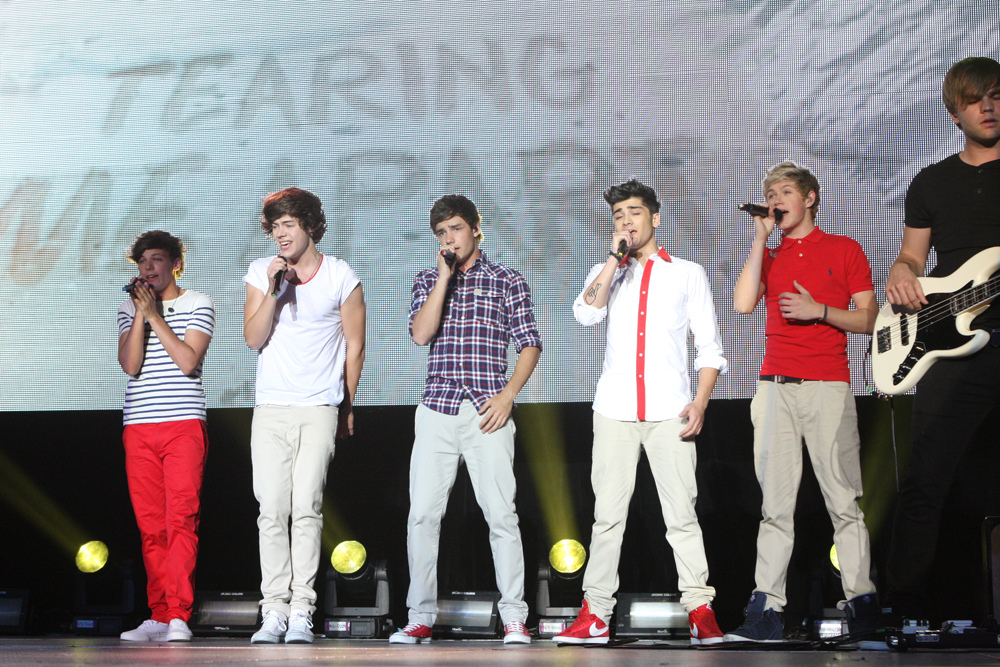
One Direction made their arrival into the UK charts this year with three top 10 entries. These included their debut number-one single "What Makes You Beautiful", as well as their guest appearance on the chart-topping charity record "Wishing on a Star" by The X Factor Finalists 2011.

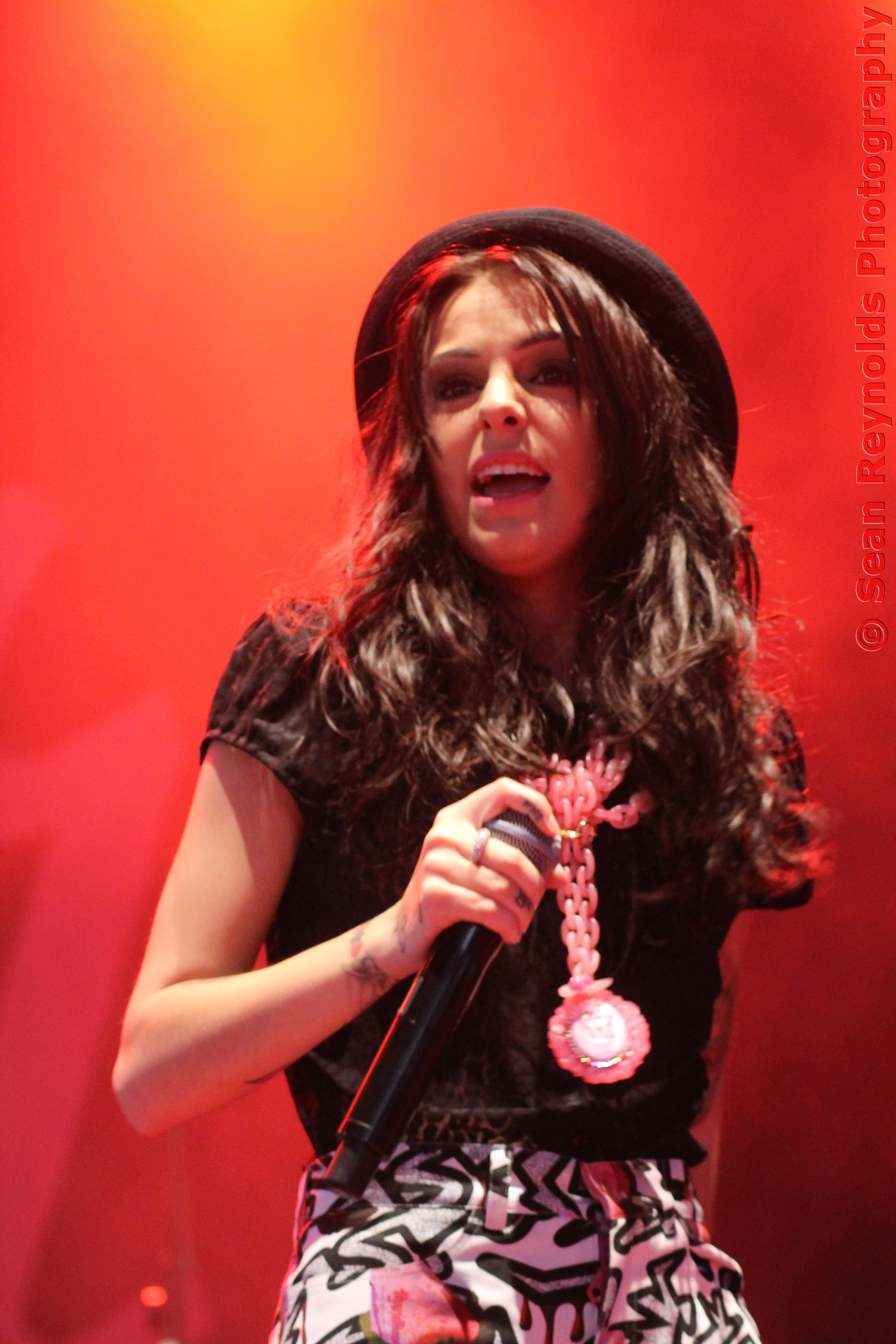
Cher Lloyd, who finished fourth in the seventh series of The X Factor, had two entries in the UK top 10 in 2011, including her debut single "Swagger Jagger", which debuted at number-one in August.

The following table shows artists who achieved two or more top 10 entries in 2011, including singles that reached their peak in 2010 or 2012. The figures include both main artists and featured artists, while appearances on ensemble charity records are also counted for each artist. The total number of weeks an artist spent in the top ten in 2011 is also shown.

Entries	Artist	Weeks	Singles
7	Rihanna ^{[S]}^{[V]}^{[XX]}	32	"California King Bed", "Only Girl (In the World)", "S&M", "Take Care", "We Found Love", "What's My Name?", "Who's That Chick?"
5	David Guetta ^{[S]}^{[XX]}	21	"Little Bad Girl", "Sweat", "Where Them Girls At", "Who's That Chick?", "Without You"
4	Jessie J	20	"Do It like a Dude", "Nobody's Perfect", "Price Tag", "Who You Are"
4	JLS ^{[WW]}	11	"Eyes Wide Shut", "She Makes Me Wanna", "Take a Chance on Me", "Wishing on a Star"
3	Adele ^{[S]}	20	"Make You Feel My Love", "Rolling in the Deep", "Someone like You"
3	Bruno Mars ^{[W]}	18	"Grenade", "The Lazy Song", "Lighters"
3	Calvin Harris ^{[X]}	22	"Bounce", "Feel So Close", "We Found Love"
3	Chris Brown ^{[Y]}	20	"Beautiful People", "Champion", "Yeah 3x"
3	Dev ^{[S]}^{[Z]}^{[AA]}	8	"Bass Down Low", "Like a G6", "She Makes Me Wanna"
3	Ed Sheeran	23	"The A Team", "Lego House", "You Need Me, I Don't Need You"
3	Example ^{[BB]}	13	"Changed the Way You Kiss Me", "Stay Awake", "Unorthodox"
3	Katy Perry ^{[S]}	13	"E.T.", "Firework", "Last Friday Night (T.G.I.F.)"
3	Lady Gaga	14	"Born This Way", "The Edge of Glory", "Judas"
3	Olly Murs ^{[S]}	12	"Dance with Me Tonight", "Heart Skips a Beat", "Thinking of Me"
3	One Direction ^{[WW]}	8	"Gotta Be You", "What Makes You Beautiful", "Wishing on a Star"
3	Rizzle Kicks ^{[CC]}	11	"Down with the Trumpets", "Heart Skips a Beat", "When I Was a Youngster"
3	The Wanted	10	"Glad You Came", "Gold Forever", "Lightning"
3	Wretch 32	8	"Don't Go", "Traktor", "Unorthodox"
2	50 Cent ^{[DD]}	7	"Buzzin'", "Right There"
2	Adam Levine ^{[EE]}^{[FF]}	19	"Moves like Jagger", "Stereo Hearts"
2	Avicii	7	"Collide", "Levels"
2	Black Eyed Peas ^{[S]}	8	"Just Can't Get Enough", "The Time (Dirty Bit)"
2	The Cataracs ^{[S]}^{[Z]}^{[GG]}	4	"Bass Down Low", "Like a G6"
2	Cher Lloyd	4	"Swagger Jagger", "With Ur Love"
2	Coldplay ^{[T]}	5	"Every Teardrop Is a Waterfall", "Paradise"
2	Dappy	4	"No Regrets", "Spaceship"
2	Drake ^{[S]}^{[HH]}^{[XX]}	7	"Take Care", "What's My Name?"
2	Emeli Sandé ^{[II]}	6	"Heaven", "Read All About It"
2	Eminem ^{[JJ]}^{[KK]}	5	"I Need a Doctor", "Lighters"
2	Flo Rida ^{[T]}^{[LL]}	9	"Good Feeling", "Where Them Girls At"
2	Jason Derulo	8	"Don't Wanna Go Home", "It Girl"
2	Jennifer Lopez	11	"I'm Into You", "On the Floor"
2	Katy B	5	"Broken Record", "Lights On"
2	Kelly Rowland ^{[MM]}	3	"Down for Whatever", "What a Feeling"
2	Leona Lewis	3	"Collide", "Hurt"
2	Lil Wayne ^{[NN]}	6	"Dedication to My Ex (Miss That)", "I'm Into You"
2	Little Mix ^{[WW]}	4	"Cannonball", "Wishing on a Star"
2	LMFAO	18	"Party Rock Anthem", "Sexy and I Know It"
2	Ludacris ^{[OO]}^{[RR]}	6	"Little Bad Girl", "Tonight (I'm Lovin' You)"
2	Matt Cardle ^{[S]}	5	"Run for Your Life", "When We Collide"
2	Nero	3	"Guilt", "Promises"
2	Nicki Minaj ^{[LL]}	5	"Super Bass", "Where Them Girls At"
2	Nicole Scherzinger	8	"Don't Hold Your Breath", "Right There"
2	Pitbull ^{[PP]}	20	"Give Me Everything", "On the Floor"
2	Pixie Lott	5	"All About Tonight", "What Do You Take Me For?"
2	The Saturdays	3	"All Fired Up", "Notorious"
2	Skylar Grey ^{[JJ]}^{[QQ]}	7	"Coming Home", "I Need a Doctor"
2	Taio Cruz ^{[OO]}	7	"Higher", "Little Bad Girl"
2	Tinie Tempah ^{[SS]}	12	"Earthquake", "Eyes Wide Shut"
2	Travie McCoy ^{[TT]}^{[UU]}	6	"Higher", "Stereo Hearts"
2	Wiz Khalifa ^{[VV]}	7	"5 O'Clock", "Black and Yellow"

== Notes ==
- ^{a} "Make You Feel My Love" re-entered the top 10 at number 7 on 16 January following usage on Dancing on Ice.
- ^{b} "Thinking of Me" re-entered the top 10 at number 10 on 2 January.
- ^{c} "Who's That Chick?" re-entered the top 10 at number 10 on 9 January.
- ^{d} "Lights On" re-entered the top 10 at number 4 on 9 January.
- ^{e} "Do It Like a Dude" re-entered the top 10 at number 10 on 6 March following the release of the album, Who You Are.
- ^{f} "Eyes Wide Shut" re-entered the top 10 at number 8 on 20 February following physical release.
- ^{g} "S&M" re-entered the top 10 at number 7 on 17 April following the release of a remix featuring Britney Spears.
- ^{h} "Fast Car" originally peaked at number 5 upon its initial release in 1988. It re-entered the top 10 at its brand new peak of number 4 on 30 April 2011 (week ending) following usage on Britain's Got Talent.
- ^{i} "Judas" re-entered the top 10 at number 8 on 22 May following a performance at Radio 1's Big Weekend.
- ^{j} "The Edge of Glory" re-entered the top 10 at number 8 on 26 June following the release of the accompanying music video.
- ^{k} "Every Teardrop Is a Waterfall" re-entered the top 10 at number 10 on 3 July following a performance at Glastonbury Festival.
- ^{l} "Back to Black" entered the top 10 at number 8 on 31 July following the death of Amy Winehouse, having originally peaked at number 25 upon release in 2007.
- ^{m} "Jealousy" re-entered the top 10 at number 9 on 18 September following a price reduction on iTunes.
- ^{n} "The A Team" re-entered the top 10 at number 7 on 25 September and again at number 9 on 16 October following usage on The X Factor.
- ^{o} "Cannonball" entered the top 10 at number 9 on 25 September following usage on The X Factor, having originally peaked at number 19 upon release in 2004.
- ^{p} "Iris" entered the top 10 at number 3 on 2 October following usage on The X Factor, having originally peaked at number 26 upon release in 1999.
- ^{q} "Jar of Hearts" re-entered the top 10 at number 4 on 16 October following usage on The X Factor and again on 20 November at number 10 following a performance on Strictly Come Dancing.
- ^{r} "Without You" re-entered the top 10 at number 10 on 6 November following a price reduction on iTunes.
- ^{s} Figure includes song that peaked in 2010.
- ^{t} Figure includes song that peaked in 2012.
- ^{u} Released as the official single for Comic Relief.
- ^{v} Figure includes appearance on Drake's "Take Care" and David Guetta's "Who's That Chick?".
- ^{w} Figure includes appearance on Bad Meets Evil's "Lighters".
- ^{x} Figure includes appearance on Rihanna's "We Found Love".
- ^{y} Figure includes appearance on Chipmunk's "Champion".
- ^{z} Figure includes appearance on Far East Movement's "Like a G6".
- ^{aa} Figure includes appearance on JLS' "She Makes Me Wanna".
- ^{bb} Figure includes appearance on Wretch 32's "Unorthodox".
- ^{cc} Figure includes appearance on Olly Murs' "Heart Skips a Beat".
- ^{dd} Figure includes appearance on Mann's "Buzzin'" and Nicole Scherzinger's "Right There".
- ^{ee} Figure includes appearance on Gym Class Heroes' "Stereo Hearts".
- ^{ff} Figure includes one top 10 single with the group Maroon 5.
- ^{gg} Figure includes appearance on Dev's "Bass Down Low".
- ^{hh} Figure includes appearance on Rihanna's "What's My Name?".
- ^{ii} Figure includes appearance on Professor Green's "Read All About It".
- ^{jj} Figure includes appearance on Dr. Dre's "I Need a Doctor".
- ^{kk} Figures includes one top 10 single with the group Bad Meets Evil.
- ^{ll} Figure includes appearance on David Guetta's "Where Them Girls At".
- ^{mm} Figure includes appearance on Alex Gaudino's "What a Feeling".
- ^{nn} Figure includes appearances on Lloyd's "Dedication to My Ex (Miss That)" and Jennifer Lopez's "I'm Into You".
- ^{oo} Figure includes appearance on David Guetta's "Little Bad Girl"
- ^{pp} Figure includes appearance on Jennifer Lopez's "On the Floor".
- ^{qq} Figure includes appearance on Diddy — Dirty Money's "Coming Home".
- ^{rr} Figure includes appearance on Enrique Iglesias' "Tonight (I'm Lovin' You)".
- ^{ss} Figure includes appearances on Labrinth's "Earthquake" and JLS' "Eyes Wide Shut".
- ^{tt} Figure includes appearance on Taio Cruz's "Higher".
- ^{uu} Figure includes one top 10 single with the group Gym Class Heroes.
- ^{vv} Figure includes appearance on T-Pain's "5 O'Clock".
- ^{ww} Figure includes appearance on "Wishing on a Star" as part of The X Factor UK 2011 finalists.
- ^{xx} Figure includes song that first charted in 2010 but peaked in 2011.

== See also ==
- 2011 in British music
- List of number-one singles from the 2010s (UK)
