= Whole (campaign) =

Anti-stigma mental health campaign

#IAMWHOLE is a British anti-stigma mental health campaign developed in partnership with the NHS and YMCA. It first launched in 2016 and is fronted by one half of Rizzle Kicks, Jordan Stephens.

== History ==
In 2016, Spirit Media, the NHS and YMCA developed the #IAMWHOLE campaign for Brighton & Hove City Council. The idea for the campaign was inspired by Jordan Stephens’ track ‘Whole’, for which Spirit Media was filming the music video at the time.

2016 saw the launch of the campaign on World Mental Health Day at Brighton's British Airways i360 tower. The day also saw then Secretary of State for Health Jeremy Hunt visit a local school to meet pupils and discuss mental health with them.

British alternative rock band Nothing But Thieves joined WHOLE for its second year, recording an acoustic version of their single "Broken Machine" exclusively for the campaign.

The music video was launched on World Mental Health Day atop the BT Tower, with Nothing But Thieves performing an acoustic gig to an intimate audience.

== WHOLE Hour ==
In 2018 and 2019, on World Mental Health Day, WHOLE extended the campaign to create The WHOLE Hour, which aims to recognise and champion the importance of self care and taking time to look after your mental health.

Within the WHOLE Hour, which should become a regular feature of your schedule, an hour should be spent doing something active and healthy, creative and fun, mindful and thoughtful, or restful and relaxing, there are a variety of things you can do to make you feel good.

== Music 4 Mental Health ==
Also in 2018, WHOLE announced two new arms to the #IAMWHOLE campaign: a Music 4 Mental Health event in London and a podcast, WHOLE TRUTH.

Music 4 Mental Health was an event taking place at the Roundhouse in London, featuring performances from Ed Sheeran, Anne-Marie, Ella Eyre, James Arthur, Olly Murs and others.

The event was a collaboration between WHOLE, YMCA England & Wales, The Mix UK and CALM.

== WHOLE Truth Podcast ==
The Whole Truth podcast is Jordan Stephens' pursuit of a good conversation about mental health. Guests include Reggie Yates, Lucy Rose, Professor Green and Jason Fox.

Hussain Manawer guest hosted Whole Truth whilst Jordan was away in January & February 2020.

== The WHOLE Truth TV Show ==
The Whole Truth TV show premiered on Channel4 in the UK on 9 October 2020 to mark World Mental Health Day. Musician, actor and co-founder of the mental health movement #IAMWHOLE, Jordan Stephens hosted a conversation with UK artists Che Lingo, Arlo Parks and Kojey Radical. Music performance and discussion from the programming featured on Channel 4, All4 and 4 Music. The show was produced by co-founders of #IAMWHOLE, Spirit Studios.

== Digital Detox Day ==
Digital Detox Day raises awareness about the negative impact social media can have on our mental health, and helps people to form healthier relationships with their devices.

The campaign is a collaboration between LUSH, Zoe Sugg, and mental health organisation #IAMWHOLE founded by Jordan Stephens.

Digital Detox Day took place all over the world on 5 September 2020, when we will be asking people to step away from their phones for one whole day.
