= Dreamers (Rizzle Kicks song) =

Single by Rizzle Kicks

from the album Stereo Typical
- Released: 3 August 2012
- Recorded: 2011
- Genre: Alternative hip hop
- Length: 4:38
- Label: Universal Island
- Songwriters: Harley Alexander-Sule; Emily Phillips; Jordan Stephens; Ant Whiting; Patrick Lyons; Alex Spyropoulos
- Producer: Ant Whiting

Rizzle Kicks singles chronology
"Traveller's Chant" (2012)	"Dreamers" (2012)	"Lost Generation" (2013)

Ed Sheeran singles chronology
"Hush Little Baby" (2012)	"Dreamers" (2012)	"Watchtower" (2012)

Professor Green singles chronology
"Remedy" (2012)	"Dreamer" (2012)	"Avalon" (2012)

"Dreamers" is the sixth official single taken from English hip hop duo Rizzle Kicks' debut studio album, Stereo Typical. The single was released in the United Kingdom on 3 August 2012. The track was produced by Ant Whiting. The song features a sample from Nirvana's 1968 single Rainbow Chaser. A music video to accompany the release of "Dreamers" was uploaded to YouTube on 25 July 2012, at a total length of four minutes and forty-two seconds. It was directed and filmed by Toby Lockerbie. The video features footage of the duo partying on a desert island with a group of friends. Dappy makes a cameo appearance in the video.

An "Epic Remix" of the track was released as part of the single package. It contains additional verses from Pharoahe Monch, Hines (Rizzle's old rap mentor), Professor Green, Ed Sheeran, Foreign Beggars, Dr. Syntax and Chali 2na. This remix premiered on 1 August 2012 via SoundCloud. The "Epic Remix" received its own additional single artwork, which accompanied its premiere.

== Track listing ==
Promotional CD single
No.	Title	Length
1.	"Dreamers" (Moto Blanco radio edit)	3:33

Digital download
No.	Title	Length
1.	"Dreamers"	4:38
2.	"Epic Dreamers' Remix" (featuring Pharoahe Monch, Hines, Professor Green, Ed Sheeran, Foreign Beggars and Chali 2na)	5:43

Digital download – EP
No.	Title	Length
1.	"Epic Dreamers' Remix" (featuring Pharoahe Monch, Hines, Professor Green, Ed Sheeran, Foreign Beggars and Chali 2na)	5:43
2.	"Dreamers" (instrumental version)	4:38
3.	"Dreamers" (acapella version)	4:15
4.	"Dreamers" (Moto Blanco radio edit)	3:33

== Charts ==
Chart (2012)	Peak position
UK Singles (Official Charts Company	105
UK Hip Hop/R&B (OCC)	18

== Release history ==
Region	Date	Format	Label
United Kingdom	3 August 2012	Digital download; CD single	Universal Island Records
