= Ant Whiting =

- Born: Anthony Whiting
- Occupations: Songwriter, producer, musician
- Label: Sony/ATV Music Publishing
- Website: Ant Whiting Management

Anthony Whiting, better known as Ant Whiting, is a British songwriter, multi-instrumentalist, and producer signed to Sony/ATV Music Publishing. He has worked as a producer and songwriter with artists such as John Newman and Rizzle Kicks.

== Biography ==
Whiting began his production and writing career with two tracks on MIA's debut album Arular, including the singles "Fire Fire" & "Bingo." Since then Whiting has co-written & produced for a number of established artists, his biggest success to date has been with Rizzle Kicks as the main co-writer and producer on the platinum selling UK No. 5 album Stereo Typical, where he delivered six tracks including two singles "Traveller's Chant" and "Dreamer's." Whiting worked with Rizzle Kicks writing for their follow up album (Roaring 20s) out September 2013, where he wrote & produced the majority of their album alongside producer Norman Cook.

Further releases in 2013 included cuts with Devlin (Island) and Chlöe Howl (Columbia), tracks for Ella Eyre (Virgin), and co-writing with Willy Moon (Island). He also produced the John Newman debut album Tribute, which peaked at No. 1 on the UK album charts. He also worked on the debut by Becky Hill.

== Discography ==
=== Credits ===
Selected production and songwriting credits for Ant Whiting
Yr	Album or song title	Artist(s)	Release details	Writing credits	Production details
2004	"Sunshowers" (#93 UK)	MIA	XL	n/a	Add. vocals and production
2005	"Bingo"	MIA	XL/Columbia	Co-writer	Add. vocals and production
2005	"Fire Fire"	MIA	XL/Columbia	Co-writer	Add. vocals and production
2005	"Prospect Hummer"	Animal Collective	FatCat Records	n/a	Produced, recorded, mixed
2008	"See You When You Get Here"	Lisa Mitchell	Warner	n/a	Produced, recorded, mixed
2009	The Animal	Richard Walters	Kartel	n/a	Producer, engineer, mix
2009	Eugene McGuinness	Eugene McGuinness	Domino	n/a	Producer (primary)
2009	"Duchess of Mess"	Lisa Mitchell	Warner AUS	n/a	Producer
2009	"Heroine"	Lisa Mitchell	Warner AUS	Co-writer	Producer (primary)
2009	"Animals"	Lisa Mitchell	Warner AUS	Co-writer	Producer (primary)
2009	"Stevie"	Lisa Mitchell	Warner AUS	n/a	Producer (primary)
2009	"So Jealous"	Lisa Mitchell	Warner AUS	Co-writer	Producer (primary)
2010	"I'm The Fool"	SoundGirl	Mercury	n/a	Add. Production & Mix
2010	"Modern Day Romance"	Jagga	Pure Groove	Co-writer	Producer
2011	"Don't Know Why" (#45 UK)	SoundGirl	Mercury	Co-writer	Production
2011	"Dancing on My Own"	Pixie Lott	Mercury	n/a	Add. Production & Mix
2011	"Dreamers" (#105 UK)	Rizzle Kicks	Island	Co-writer	Producer (primary)
2011	"Round Up"	Rizzle Kicks	Island	Co-writer	Producer (primary)
2011	"Homewrecker"	Rizzle Kicks	Island	Co-writer	Producer (primary)
2011	"Learn My Lesson"	Rizzle Kicks	Island	Co-writer	Producer (primary)
2011	"Even on a Rainy Day"	Rizzle Kicks	Island	Co-writer	Producer (primary)
2011	"Traveller's Chant" (#44 UK)	Rizzle Kicks	Island	Co-writer	Producer (primary)
2011	"Garden"	Rizzle Kicks	Island	Co-writer	Producer (primary)
2012	Vivid	Crystal Kay	Universal	Co-writer	n/a
2013	Tribute (#1 UK)	John Newman	Island	n/a	Co-producer
2013	"Out of My Head" (#91 UK)	John Newman	Island	n/a	Co-producer
2013	"Losing Sleep" (#48 UK)	John Newman	Island	n/a	Co-producer
2013	"Cheating" (#9 UK)	John Newman	Island	n/a	Co-producer
2013	Roaring 20s	Rizzle Kicks	Island	Co-writer	Producer (primary)
2013	"Skip to the Good Bit" (#16 UK)	Rizzle Kicks	Island	Lyrics	Co-producer
2013	"Lost Generation" (#6 UK)	Rizzle Kicks	Island	Co-writer	Producer (primary)
2013	"Thank You Very Much" (#2 POL)	Margaret	Magic	n/a	Producer (primary)
2013	"Really Cold"	Devlin	Island	Co-writer	Producer (primary)
2014	Add the Blonde (#8 POL)	Margaret	Magic	Co-writer	Co-producer
2014	"Wasted" (#6 POL)	Margaret	Magic	Co-writer	n/a

=== Remixes ===
Selected remixes by Ant Whiting, with date of remix release
Year	Title	Original artist	Release details
2005	"Hombre"	MIA	XL / Columbia
2006	"You're My Flame"	Zero 7	Atlantic
2006	"Want"	Natalie Imbruglia	Island
2009	"Stone Cold Sober"	Paloma Faith	Epic

== See also ==
- List of songwriters
