= Prophet (Better Watch It) =

Single by Rizzle Kicks

from the album Stereo Typical
- Released: 14 May 2011
- Recorded: 2011
- Genre: Alternative hip hop
- Length: 3:10
- Label: Universal Island
- Songwriter(s): Jordan Stephens, Harvey Alexander-Sule, James Dring, Jody Street
- Producer(s): The Rural

Rizzle Kicks singles chronology
"Prophet (Better Watch It)" (2011)	"Down with the Trumpets" (2011)

"Prophet (Better Watch It)" is the debut single released by British hip hop duo Rizzle Kicks, from their debut studio album, Stereo Typical. The single was released on 14 May 2011, in the United Kingdom. A music video to accompany the release was uploaded to YouTube on 2 April 2011, at a total length of three minutes and forty-nine seconds. It features the pair performing in a trance-like state whilst on a beach. The duo performed the song live for the first time on T4 on 2 June 2011. The single was a commercial flop, and as such, "Down with the Trumpets" is widely regarded as the group's debut and breakthrough single.

== Track listing ==
Promotional CD single
No.	Title	Length
1.	"Prophet (Better Watch It)" (clean radio edit)	3:10

Digital download
No.	Title	Length
1.	"Prophet (Better Watch It)" (album version)	3:10

== Charts ==
Chart	Peak position
UK Hip Hop/R&B (OCC)	17

== Release history ==
Region	Date	Format	Label
United Kingdom	14 May 2011	digital download	Universal Island Records
