= Mama Do the Hump =

2011 single by Rizzle Kicks

Single by Rizzle Kicks

from the album Stereo Typical
- Released: 16 December 2011
- Recorded: 2011
- Genre: Alternative hip hop; British hip hop; country rap
- Length: 3:36
- Label: Universal Island
- Songwriters: Rizzle Kicks, Norman Cook
- Producer: Fatboy Slim

Rizzle Kicks singles chronology
"Teardrop" (2011)	"Mama Do the Hump" (2011)	"Traveller's Chant" (2012)

"Mama Do the Hump" is the third official single taken from British hip hop duo Rizzle Kicks' debut studio album, Stereo Typical (2011). The single was released in the United Kingdom on 16 December 2011. The track was produced by Fatboy Slim. The song incorporates a sample of Craig McLachlan's 1990 cover of "Mona (I Need You Baby)", originally recorded by Bo Diddley and an interpolation of "Reunion" by Bobbie Gentry. It peaked at number two on the UK Singles Chart on 22 January 2012, held off the top spot by Jessie J's "Domino". It contains uncredited vocals from MNEK, who performs the chorus.

The song was the 17th best-selling single of 2012 in the UK with sales of 559,000 for the year. Also, the song has been used a lot in the media, for example in the adverts for American import sitcom Mom, as well as the adverts for the Chromecast.

== Critical reception ==
Robert Copsey of Digital Spy gave the song a positive review stating: "Not that you'd guess from their casual and carefree attitude on the track. "I just want all of these girls to be on me, And maybe even one of them could be Beyoncé," they cheekily boast over a bounding guitar riff before engaging in some bump 'n' grind with their "Mama" on the dancefloor. The result is the Christmas party of songs - a proper knees-up that rarely fails to disappoint."

== Music video ==
A music video to accompany the release of "Mama Do the Hump" was uploaded to YouTube on 29 November 2011, at a total length of four minutes and fifteen seconds. It was directed by Jordan 'Rizzle' Stephens and filmed by Jim Shreim. The video features Jordan's mother and aunt miming to the rapping. Eamonn Walker appears in the video and James Corden also makes a cameo appearance, arriving towards the end of the video at 3:07 and being let by the duo through the front door. He puts his coat down and then suddenly begins dancing to the chorus.

== Track listings ==
Promotional CD single
No.	Title	Length
1.	"Mama Do the Hump"	3:36

Digital Remix EP
No.	Title	Length
1.	"Mama Do the Hump" (Freemasons Club Remix)	7:38
2.	"Mama Do the Hump" (Freemasons Boozer Remix)	5:05
3.	"Mama Do the Hump" (Vato Gonzalez Remix)	6:18
4.	"Mama Do the Hump" (Bimbo Jones Remix)	6:13
5.	"Mama Do the Hump" (Benji Boko Remix)	4:02
6.	"Mama Do the Hump" (Brett McLaughlan & The Doleboy Millionaires Remix)	4:29

== Charts ==
=== Weekly charts ===
Chart (2011–2012)	Peak position
Australia (ARIA)	56
Belgium (Ultratip Bubbling Under Flanders)	55
Ireland (IRMA)	3
Scotland Singles (Official Charts)	3
UK Hip Hop/R&B (Official Charts)	1
UK Singles (Official Charts)	2

=== Year-end charts ===
Chart (2011)	Position
UK Singles (OCC)	180
Chart (2012)	Position
UK Singles (OCC)	17

== Certifications ==
Region	Certification	Certified units/sales
United Kingdom (BPI)	Platinum	600,000^{^}
^{^} Shipments figures based on certification alone.

== Release history ==
Region	Date	Format	Label
United Kingdom	16 December 2011	Digital download	Universal Island Records
