= Traveller's Chant =

Single by Rizzle Kicks

from the album Stereo Typical
- Released: 8 April 2012
- Recorded: 2011
- Genre: Alternative hip hop
- Length: 3:28
- Label: Universal Island
- Songwriter(s): Rizzle Kicks; Ant Whiting
- Producer(s): Ant Whiting

Rizzle Kicks singles chronology
"Mama Do the Hump" (2011)	"Traveller's Chant" (2012)	"Dreamers" (2012)

"Traveller's Chant" is the fourth official single taken from British hip hop duo Rizzle Kicks' debut studio album, Stereo Typical. The single was released in the United Kingdom on 8 April 2012. The track was produced by Ant Whiting. A music video to accompany the release of "Traveller's Chant" was uploaded to YouTube on 26 February 2012, at a total length of three minutes and thirty-one seconds. It was directed and filmed by Toby Lockerbie.

== Track listing ==
Promotional CD single
No.	Title	Length
1.	"Traveller's Chant"	3:28

Digital download
No.	Title	Length
1.	"Traveller's Chant"	3:28
2.	"Nasty"	2:50
3.	"Traveller's Chant" (Bimbo Jones West Pier Radio Edit)	3:16
4.	"Traveller's Chant" (Bimbo Jones West Pier Remix)	6:41
5.	"Traveller's Chant" (Young Favourite Remix)	5:18

== Charts ==
Chart (2012)	Peak position
Ireland (IRMA)	8
UK Hip Hop/R&B (OCC)	6
UK Singles (OCC)	44

== Release history ==
Region	Date	Format	Label
United Kingdom	8 April 2012	Digital download	Universal Island Records
