= Stereo Typical =

Studio album by Rizzle Kicks
- Released: 28 October 2011
- Recorded: 2010–2011
- Genre: Hip hop
- Length: 49:39
- Label: Island
- Producers: Ant Whiting; The Rural; Future Cut; Mike Spencer; Craig Dodds; Fatboy Slim

Rizzle Kicks chronology
Stereo Typical (2011)	Roaring 20s (2013)

Singles from Stereo Typical
- 1. "Prophet (Better Watch It)" Released: 14 May 2011; 2. "Down with the Trumpets" Released: 10 June 2011; 3. "When I Was a Youngster" Released: 21 October 2011; 4. "Mama Do the Hump" Released: 18 December 2011; 5. "Traveller's Chant" Released: 8 April 2012; 6. "Dreamers" Released: 3 August 2012

Stereo Typical is the debut studio album by English hip hop duo Rizzle Kicks. The album was released on 28 October 2011 through Universal Music Group and was met with generally positive reviews.

== Singles ==
- "Prophet (Better Watch It)" was released as the album's first official single on 14 May 2011. Although being released to radio two months prior, the single was unsuccessful, did not chart, and was quickly succeeded. The music video for the track was filmed on Brighton beach, and features a number of scenes in which the duo become warped between the scene and a series of neon lights.
- "Down with the Trumpets" was released as the album's second single on 10 June 2011. A demo version of the track was released via YouTube in 2010, however, this was removed when the track was officially released. The single became part of the record company's On Air, On Sale policy, debuting at #81 on the UK singles chart. The song reached a peak of number 8 seven weeks after its release. It features Jack Birchwood on trumpets.
- "When I Was a Youngster" was released as the album's third official single on 21 October 2011. The track was released a week prior to the album, peaking at number 8 on the week of release. The track is notable for being one of just four songs from the past year in music to be played at the 2012 Summer Olympics opening ceremony, created by Danny Boyle.
- "Mama Do the Hump" was released as the album's fourth official single on 18 December 2011. The track became the duo's highest-charting single, peaking at number 2 on the UK singles chart, four weeks after its release. The music video for the track features cameos from James Corden, and both Jordan and Harley's parents. The single remains the duo's most successful release.
- "Traveller's Chant" was released as the album's fifth official single on 8 April 2012. The track peaked at number 44 on the week of release, becoming the second worst charting single from the album. The music video for the track premiered on 26 February, and features Jordan in the back of a cab, while Harley wanders along a cold, dark, snowy street.
- "Dreamers" was released as the album's sixth official single on 5 August 2012. The music video premiered on 25 July, featuring footage of the duo partying with a group of friends on a tropical island. The single version of the track is subtitled the "Epic Remix", and is a collaboration with Pharoahe Monch, Hines, Professor Green, Ed Sheeran, Foreign Beggars and Chali 2na.

=== Promotional singles ===
- "Miss Cigarette" was released as a promotional single on 23 December 2010, becoming the duo's first ever official release. A video for the song was uploaded to the group's YouTube account. The track was not eligible to chart.
- "Stop with the Chatter" was released as a promotional single on 28 October 2011, in order to promote the release of the album. A music video was uploaded to YouTube in promotion of the track. The track was not eligible to chart.
- "Even on a Rainy Day" was released as a promotional single on 30 April 2012, to promote the group's theatre and college tour of 2012. The video features footage of the song being performed live on tour, alongside clips of fans and backstage antics.
- "Demolition Man" was released as a promotional single on 11 July 2012, to promote the new away strip for Arsenal FC's 2012–2013 season. A short music video was uploaded to YouTube, featuring several players of the Arsenal squad.

== Reception ==
The album was met with mostly positive reviews from music critics, and currently holds a Metacritic score of 70. AllMusic gave the album 3.5 stars out of 5, saying "Stereo Typical's good-natured swagger marks Rizzle Kicks out as one of the British urban scene's most entertaining new talents." Q magazine gave the album 3 out of 5 and called Rizzle Kicks "a pop prospect with a winning charm you just can't teach". The Guardian called the album a "cute soundbed for quickfire lyrics that reveal them to be typical teenage boys" and gave it 4 out of 5.

NME felt that the duo "tag-team across the record with a cheery glint, a self-deprecating wink and a boundless charm that's hard not to like" and gave the album 6 out of 10. BBC Music said, in a positive review that the album is "An infectious introduction to some rightly rising pop-rap talents." MusicOMH called the album "an impressive debut album from Rizzle Kicks. Jordan and Harley confirm through their assured lyricism that they are not afraid of embracing their 18-year-old selves, producing an album that is accomplished, whilst also appealing to their Radio 1-listening peers." and awarded it 4 out of 5. Clash music called it "a contemporary-pop triumph".

== Track listing ==
No.	Title	Writer(s)	Producer(s)	Length
1.	"Dreamers"	Harley Alexander-Sule; Emily Phillips; Jordan Stephens; Ant Whiting; Patrick Lyons; Alex Spyropoulos	Whiting	4:34
2.	"When I Was a Youngster"	Alexander-Sule; Stephens; James Dring; Jody Street	The Rural	2:55
3.	"Round Up"	Alexander-Sule; Stephens; Whiting	Whiting	3:35
4.	"Down with the Trumpets"	Alexander-Sule; Stephens; Dag Nabbit; Darren Lewis; Iyiola Babalola; Will Davies	Future Cut; Mike Spencer	3:06
5.	"Demolition Man"	Alexander-Sule; Dean Barratt; Stephens; Craig Dodds	Dodds	2:59
6.	"Prophet (Better Watch It)"	Alexander-Sule; Stephens; Dring; Street	The Rural	3:08
7.	"Mama Do the Hump"	Alexander-Sule; Timothy Powell; Stephens; Norman Cook	Fatboy Slim	3:36
8.	"Miss Cigarette"	Alexander-Sule; Stephens; Tom Caruana; Lewis; Babalola	Future Cut	4:11
9.	"Traveller's Chant"	Alexander-Sule; Phillips; Stephens; Whiting	Whiting	3:28
10.	"Stop with the Chatter"	Alexander-Sule; Stephens; Lewis; Babalola	Future Cut	3:31
11.	"Homewrecker"	Alexander-Sule; Phillips; Stephens; Whiting	Ant Whiting	3:53
12.	"Trouble"	Alexander-Sule; Stephens; Lewis; Babalola	Future Cut	3:02
13.	"Learn My Lesson"	Alexander-Sule; Phillips; Stephens; Whiting	Ant Whiting	3:29
14.	"Even on a Rainy Day"	Alexander-Sule; James Murray; Mustafa Omar; Stephens; Whiting	Whiting	4:07

Deluxe edition bonus tracks
No.	Title	Writer(s)	Producer(s)	Length
15.	"Perfect Day"	Alexander-Sule; Stephens; Lewis; Babalola	Future Cut	3:51
16.	"Garden"	Alexander-Sule; Phillips; Stephens; Whiting	Whiting	3:52
17.	"Nasty"	Alexander-Sule; Phillips; Stephens; Whiting	Whiting	3:04

== Charts ==
=== Weekly charts ===
Chart (2011–12)	Peak position
Scottish Albums (Official Charts)	13
UK Albums (Official Charts)	5
UK R&B Albums (Official Charts)	1

=== Year-end charts ===
Chart (2011)	Position
UK Albums (OCC)	100
Chart (2012)	Position
UK Albums (OCC)	40

== Release history ==
Country	Date	Format	Label
Ireland	28 October 2011	Digital download, CD	Universal Island Records
United Kingdom	31 October 2011	Digital download, CD	Universal Island Records
