= Tell Her (Rizzle Kicks song) =

Single by Rizzle Kicks
- Released: 10 August 2014
- Recorded: 2014
- Genre: British hip hop, Funk
- Length: 3:21
- Label: Universal Island
- Songwriter(s): Jordan Stephens, Harley Alexander-Sule, Ben Cullum
- Producer(s): Ben Cullum

Rizzle Kicks singles chronology
"Skip to the Good Bit" (2013)	"Tell Her" (2014)	"Always Late" (2016)

Tell Her is a 2014 single by British hip-hop duo Rizzle Kicks, produced by Ben Cullum.

In 2014, Rizzle Kicks teamed up with Evian for the 2014 Wimbledon Championships and released a single entitled "Tell Her". A music video was produced for the song. It was shot in Wimbledon and features the duo stalking Maria Sharapova. Rizzle Kicks said that filming the video was "sick". The video was released on 16 July 2014.

== Charts ==
Chart (2014)	Peak; position
Scotland (OCC)	10
UK Singles (OCC)	14
