= Down with the Trumpets =

Single by Rizzle Kicks

from the album Stereo Typical
- Released: 10 June 2011
- Recorded: 2011
- Genre: Alternative hip hop; dance-pop
- Length: 3:06
- Label: Universal Island
- Songwriters: Jordan Stephens, Harley Alexander-Sule, Dag Nabbit, Darren Lewis, Iyiola Babalola, Will Davies
- Producers: Future Cut, Mike Spencer

Rizzle Kicks singles chronology
"Prophet (Better Watch It)" (2011)	"Down with the Trumpets" (2011)	"Heart Skips a Beat" (2011)

Music video
- "Down with the Trumpets" on YouTube

"Down with the Trumpets" is the second official single released by British hip hop duo Rizzle Kicks, from their debut studio album, Stereo Typical. The single was released on 10 June 2011 in the United Kingdom. The song peaked at number eight on the UK Singles Chart and number twenty-nine on the Irish Singles Chart. It features Jack Birchwood on trumpet. A music video to accompany the release of "Down with the Trumpets" was uploaded to YouTube on 26 May 2011, at a total length of three minutes and twenty-four seconds. It features the duo being chased after causing trouble along the seaside of Hove. The duo performed the song live for the first time on T4 on 3 June 2011. An instrumental version of the song was used for Match of the Day 2's Goal of the Month feature for the 2011–12 Premier League season as well as the Goal of the Season feature on the final Match of the Day of the season.

== Music video ==
The music video features Rizzle Kicks playing trumpets and frequently falling over and landing on the floor (in reference to the 'get down' lyric). Also, there are shots of Rizzle Kicks singing on Hove Lawns and seafront – this is the scene when member Jordan Stephens says the line 'I got grass stains on my brand new white trainers'. Also, Rizzle Kicks's mentor, Tom Hines, makes an appearance.

== Track listing ==
Promotional CD single
No.	Title	Length
1.	"Down with the Trumpets"	3:06

Digital download
No.	Title	Length
1.	"Down with the Trumpets"	3:06
2.	"Down with the Trumpets" (Starslinger Remix)	3:15
3.	"Down with the Trumpets" (Wookie Remix)	4:54
4.	"Down with the Trumpets" (Music video)	3:21

Digital download – Remix EP
No.	Title	Length
1.	"Down with the Trumpets" (Max Sanna and Steve Pitron Mix)	6:06
2.	"Down with the Trumpets" (Zack's Filthy Dirty South Mix)	4:24

Digital download – Remix #1
No.	Title	Length
1.	"Down with the Trumpets" (The Radical Sifu Remix)	3:06

== Chart performance ==
=== Weekly charts ===
Chart (2011–12)	Peak position
Australia (ARIA)	52
Belgium (Ultratip Bubbling Under Flanders)	10
Ireland (IRMA)	29
Scottish Singles Sales (Official Charts)	9
UK Hip Hop/R&B (Official Charts)	2
UK Singles (Official Charts)	8
UK Official Streaming Chart Top 100	95

=== Year-end charts ===
Chart (2011)	Position
UK Singles (OCC)	61
Chart (2012)	Position
UK Singles (OCC)	193

== Release history ==
Region	Date	Format	Label
Australia	10 June 2011	Digital download	Universal Island Records
Germany	10 June 2011	Digital download	Universal Island Records
Ireland	10 June 2011	Digital download	Universal Island Records
New Zealand	10 June 2011	Digital download	Universal Island Records
Norway	10 June 2011	Digital download	Universal Island Records
Portugal	10 June 2011	Digital download	Universal Island Records
Spain	10 June 2011	Digital download	Universal Island Records
United Kingdom	10 June 2011	Digital download	Universal Island Records
