= When I Was a Youngster =

2011 single by Rizzle Kicks

Single by Rizzle Kicks

from the album Stereo Typical
- Released: 21 October 2011
- Recorded: 2011
- Genre: Alternative hip hop
- Length: 2:55
- Label: Universal Island
- Songwriter(s): Jordan Stephens, Harley Alexander-Sule, James Dring, Jody Street
- Producer(s): The Rural

Rizzle Kicks singles chronology
"Heart Skips a Beat" (2011)	"When I Was a Youngster" (2011)	"Teardrop" (2011)

"When I Was a Youngster" is the second official single released by British hip hop duo Rizzle Kicks, from their debut studio album, Stereo Typical. The single was released on 21 October 2011 in the United Kingdom. The song samples a ska sample from "Revolution Rock" by The Clash. A music video to accompany the release of "When I Was A Youngster" was uploaded to YouTube on 7 September 2011 at a total length of two minutes and fifty-nine seconds. It features British musician Ed Sheeran throwing shoes at Rizzle Kicks. The duo performed the song live for the first time on The Xtra Factor on 23 October 2011. It was featured in the opening ceremony for the 2012 Summer Olympics in London.

== Track listing ==
Promotional CD single
No.	Title	Length
1.	"When I Was a Youngster"	2:55

Digital download
No.	Title	Length
1.	"When I Was a Youngster"	2:55
2.	"Superheroes"	1:50
3.	"When I Was a Youngster" (Sonic Eclipse Remix)	5:27
4.	"When I Was a Youngster" (Mark System's Digital Soundboy Remix)	4:56

== Charts ==
=== Weekly charts ===
Chart (2011)	Peak position
Ireland (IRMA)	41
Scotland (OCC)	11
UK Hip Hop/R&B (OCC)	3
UK Singles (OCC)	8

=== Year-end charts ===
Chart (2011)	Position
UK Singles (Official Charts Company)	175

== Release history ==
Region	Date	Format	Label
United Kingdom	21 October 2011	Digital download	Universal Island Records
