= Heart Skips a Beat =

2011 single by Olly Murs

Single by Olly Murs featuring Rizzle Kicks or Chiddy Bang

from the album In Case You Didn't Know and Right Place, Right Time (US version)
- B-side: "On My Cloud"
- Released: 19 August 2011
- Recorded: 2010
- Genre: Pop
- Length: 3:22
- Label: Epic; Syco
- Songwriters: Alex Smith; Samuel Preston; Jim Eliot; Jordan Stephens; Harley Alexander-Sule
- Producers: Alex Smith & Matt Furmidge

Olly Murs singles chronology
"Busy" (2011)	"Heart Skips a Beat" (2011)	"Dance with Me Tonight" (2011)

Rizzle Kicks singles chronology
"Down with the Trumpets" (2011)	"Heart Skips a Beat" (2011)	"When I Was a Youngster" (2011)

"Heart Skips a Beat" is a song by English singer-songwriter Olly Murs, taken from his second studio album, In Case You Didn't Know. The song features vocals from English hip hop duo Rizzle Kicks, and was released as the album's lead single on 19 August 2011. It was written by Alex Smith, Preston, Kish Mauve and Rizzle Kicks. In the United Kingdom, the song debuted at number one with first-week sales of over 109,000 copies, becoming his second number-one single. It also served as the closing song at Murs' 2012 arena tour.

The song achieved further success topping the charts in Germany and Switzerland, until it was overtaken by Murs' 2012 single "Troublemaker". The song has charted at number six in Ireland, becoming his second highest-charting single in the country at the time. The song gave Murs his second consecutive nomination for "Best British Single" at the 2012 Brit Awards, after "Please Don't Let Me Go" was nominated at the 2011 ceremony. The track was released as Murs' debut single in the United States on 22 May 2012. The track was remixed for the American market, removing Rizzle Kicks and including a new verse from Chiddy Bang. It entered the Billboard Hot 100 at #96, and managed to peak at #25 on the Pop chart.

== Background ==
"Heart Skips a Beat" was written by Alex Smith, Preston, Jim Eliot and Rizzle Kicks. It is the only song Murs did not co-write for the In Case You Didn't Know album. Of the track, he said: "It was a curve ball and nothing like anything else on the album, but I loved the production and the writers wrote it for me." The song had originally been put forward for his debut album but Murs' team held it back in order to launch his second album In Case You Didn't Know, with Rizzle Kicks being implemented on the track two weeks before the final version was made.

The U.S. version of the song features Philadelphia hip hop duo Chiddy Bang. The decision to replace Rizzle Kicks for the U.S. release was received negatively by both UK and U.S. fans of Murs, and in an interview with Murs for the Metro in August 2012, it emerged that it had been Columbia's decision to change the track for the U.S. release: "It wasn't my decision, it was the label. It said UK rappers don't go down well in the US. The boys [Rizzle Kicks] knew that and were fine about it. I called them and told them Chiddy Bang was going to be on it instead and they were fine. I'd like it if they were on it because it's been a hit with them on it in the UK and Europe but I understand the American market is different. There are no hard feelings."

== Critical reception ==
"Heart Skips a Beat"
A 20-second sample of "Heart Skips a Beat", an electropop song.

Lewis Corner of Digital Spy gave the song a four out of five stars, stating, "Murs confesses over a ska-flecked melody, reggae beats and the cheeky vocal twang that grabbed Si's attention first time out – while a skit from street-rapping duo Rizzle Kicks ensures the whole thing remains child and chart-friendly. The result is another infectious summer-pop ditty of the back garden barbecue variety – meaning his chops can rest easy... at least for now." Entertainment website 4Music gave the song a positive review: "We're loving the new track, which has a danceable chorus and some sweet rhymes from Rizzle and Harley Sylvester, who make up our new favourite hip hop duo."

== Music videos ==
A total of three official music videos have been made to accompany the different releases of "Heart Skips a Beat". The first, directed by Corin Hardy for the original UK version, was first released onto YouTube on 15 July 2011. The video was filmed at Mile End Skate Park in East London in early July 2011. It features Murs dancing on what looks like a giant record player, with a giant record labelled as the single. The video features numerous dancers and skateboarders as extras. "Rose", the papier-mâché figure of a woman, as seen in the music video of his single "Busy", also makes a cameo appearance. Murs parodied this version of the video along with his The Xtra Factor co-host Caroline Flack for the first episode of the show's ninth series in August 2012.

A separate music video for the U.S. remix of the song was shot on 14 May 2012 at the Rose Bowl in Los Angeles. Murs confirmed on his Twitter account that same day that Chiddy Bang would feature in the U.S. version of the video, and he released a picture of himself dressed as a football coach. This version of the video was released onto YouTube on 1 June 2012 and sees Murs playing a spectator in a crowd at a football match, as well as a coach and a midfielder, trying to entice the rest of the all female team with his dance moves and tricks.

A second music video for the U.S. remix of the song was shot on 20 September 2012 at the broadwalk on Venice Beach in California, and was released onto YouTube a few days later on 27 September. This version of the video sees Murs spotting and then pursuing an attractive woman (Sofia Mattsson) up the broadwalk, trying to get her attention for the duration of the song. Just as they are about to kiss at the song's end, Murs finds himself back where he was at the start of the video, with the idea being that he dreamt about it happening. The group, Chiddy Bang, does not appear in this version of the video, and their raps are filled with cut scenes of street dancers.

== Live performances ==
Murs has performed "Heart Skips a Beat" live, with and without Rizzle Kicks, numerous times, in the lead up to and after its release. He first performed the song with Rizzle Kicks on the weekend of release at V Festival on 20 and 21 August 2011. He also performed the song with them at Children in Need on 18 November, and on that year's Christmas Day edition of Top of the Pops. He also performed the song with them as the closing number on the two sold out nights of his arena tour at London's O2 Arena on 4 and 5 February 2012. He performed the song with them again at the 2012 Brit Awards ceremony on 21 February, where the song was nominated for the "Best British Single" award, losing out to One Direction's single "What Makes You Beautiful". Here, the mix of the song for this performance incorporated a sample of Deee-Lite's song "Groove Is in the Heart". This performance was made available to download on iTunes the following day.

Murs' performances of the song without Rizzle Kicks were on TV shows such as Daybreak, This Morning, The Hollyoaks Music Show, OK! TV and Murs' special for The Album Chart Show.

Internationally, Murs has also given live performances of the song on television. In Germany, he has performed it as part of a medley with Sean Paul (who performed his song "She Doesn't Mind") and Taio Cruz (who performed his song "Troublemaker" – not to be confused with Murs' 2012 single of the same name) at the 2012 ECHO Awards in Berlin, the WOK-WM Qualifying event for Pro7 and acoustically on the Sat.1 morning show (all in March 2012). He also performed it at the 63rd edition of the bi-annual live music programme The Dome in August 2012. In Austria and Sweden, he has performed the song on the TV shows 'Joiz Livingroom' and 'Sommarkrysset' respectively in April and August 2012.

He also performed the song live with Rizzle Kicks at the French music show Taratata in March 2012 (although the performance, along with a live cover of Stevie Wonder's "Master Blaster (Jammin')" was not shown until early June 2012). In Australia, he performed the song live on morning breakfast show Sunrise and daytime chat show The Circle. Murs' first U.S. TV performance of the track was on The Tonight Show with Jay Leno on 15 June 2012. The song was also performed along with "Dance with Me Tonight" on Good Morning America on 28 September 2012.

== Track listing ==
UK CD single
No.	Title	Length
1.	"Heart Skips a Beat"	3:22
2.	"On My Cloud"	2:24

Digital EP
No.	Title	Length
1.	"Heart Skips a Beat"	3:22
2.	"Heart Skips a Beat" (MNEK's Gimmabeat Mix)	3:37
3.	"Heart Skips a Beat" (PokerFace Lyndsey Club)	5:27
4.	"On My Cloud"	2:24

German CD single
No.	Title	Length
1.	"Heart Skips a Beat"	3:22
2.	"Please Don't Let Me Go" (Acoustic)	3:24

US digital download
No.	Title	Length
1.	"Heart Skips a Beat" (US Remix) (featuring Chiddy Bang)	3:21

== Appearances in other media ==
In October 2013 the song was used in an advert for Heart FM where it shows pairs of people connecting hands to make heart shapes until it reaches a woman watching Murs perform on stage and joins her hand with his.

In September 2026, in the cast of Saturday Night Live UK performed Heart Skips a Beat in an X Factor Final 12-inspired sketch towards the end of the second episode of series two with host Jamie Demetriou.

== Charts and certifications ==
=== Weekly charts ===
Chart (2011–12)	Peak position
Australia (ARIA)	85
Austria (Ö3 Austria Top 40)	6
Belgium (Ultratip Bubbling Under Flanders)	9
Canada (Canadian Hot 100)	91
Czech Republic Airplay (ČNS IFPI)	12
Germany (GfK)	1
Europe (Euro Digital Songs)	2
Hungary (Rádiós Top 40)	12
Ireland (IRMA)	6
Luxembourg Digital Songs (Billboard)	1
Netherlands (Single Top 100)	76
Poland Airplay (ZPAV)	1
Romanian Top 100	67
Scottish Singles Sales (Official Charts)	2
Slovakia Airplay (ČNS IFPI)	31
Sweden (Sverigetopplistan)	60
Switzerland (Schweizer Hitparade)	1
UK Singles (Official Charts)	1
US Billboard Hot 100	96
US Pop Airplay (Billboard)	25

=== Year-end charts ===
Chart (2011)	Position
Austrian Singles Chart	66
UK singles chart	27
Chart (2012)	Position
Germany (Media Control Charts)	10
Hungary (Rádiós Top 40)	96
Switzerland (Swiss Hitparade)	18
UK singles chart	168

=== Certifications ===
Region	Certification	Certified units/sales
Austria (IFPI Austria)	Gold	15,000^{*}
Germany (BVMI)	3× Gold	450,000^{^}
Switzerland (IFPI Switzerland)	2× Platinum	60,000^{^}
United Kingdom (BPI)	Platinum	706,000
^{*} Sales figures based on certification alone.^{^} Shipments figures based on certification alone.

== Release history ==
Country	Date	Format	Label
Ireland	19 August 2011	Digital download	Epic Records, Syco Music
United Kingdom	21 August 2011	Digital download	Epic Records, Syco Music
United Kingdom	22 August 2011	CD single	Epic Records, Syco Music
Spain	21 August 2011	Digital download	Epic Records, Syco Music
Australia	14 October 2011	Digital download	Epic Records, Syco Music
Germany	6 January 2012	Digital download	Epic Records, Syco Music
Germany	3 February 2012	CD single	Epic Records, Syco Music
France	9 March 2012	Digital download	Epic Records, Syco Music
United States	29 May 2012	Digital download	Sony Music
United States	10 July 2012	Mainstream airplay	Columbia
