= Rizzle Kicks =

English hip hop duo

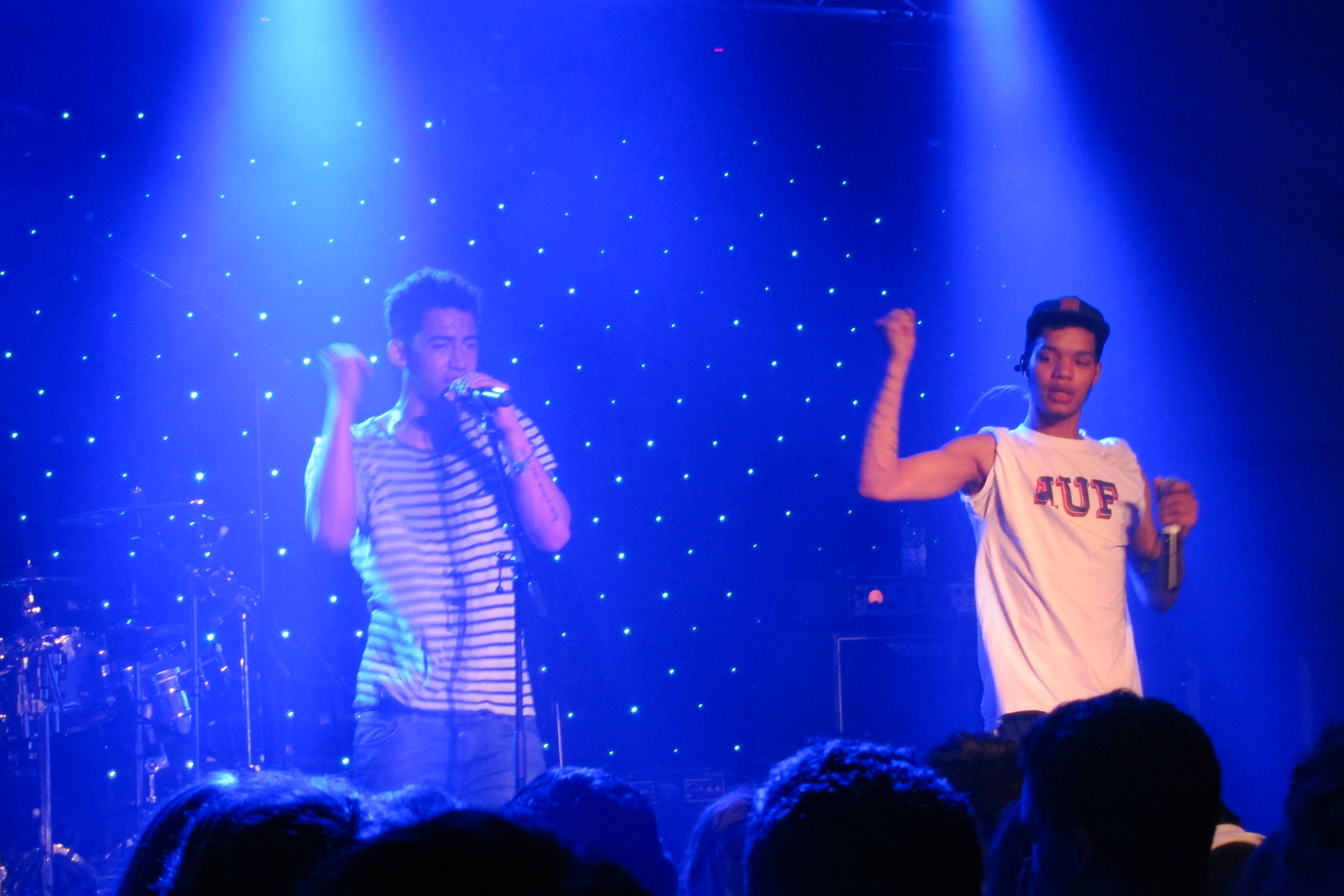
- Jordan "Rizzle" Stephens (left) and Harley Alexander-Sule at Jesus College May Ball, 2012

Background information
- Origin: Brighton, England
- Genres: British hip-hop; alternative hip-hop; pop rap; UK garage
- Instruments: Singing; rapping; guitar; trumpet
- Years active: 2008–2016; 2024–present
- Label: Island
- Members: Jordan Stephens; Harley Alexander-Sule
- Website: rizzlekicks.com

Rizzle Kicks are a British hip-hop duo from Brighton, England, consisting of Jordan "Rizzle" Stephens (born 25 January 1992) and Harley "Sylvester" Alexander-Sule (born 1991). Their debut album, Stereo Typical, was released in 2011. As of May 2012, Rizzle Kicks had sold over one million singles and over 600,000 albums in the UK.

Since 2015, Alexander-Sule has released music under the stage name Jimi Charles Moody, and since 2016, Stephens has released music under the stage names Wildhood and Al, the Native, as well as under his own name.

== History ==
=== 2006–2011: Formation and career beginnings ===
In 2006, Stephens began attending rap and performance workshops with the Brighton-based charity AudioActive, joined a year later by Alexander-Sule. The pair attended AudioActive's Hip Hop Foundation project and Stephens continued attending workshops and performances until 2010. Stephens is quoted as saying this work helped the duo "hone our skills and build a passion towards the career that we're in now. AudioActive did us a lot of good and without them we wouldn't be here!"

Stephens and Alexander-Sule both attended the BRIT School, where Stephens studied media and Alexander-Sule studied theatre. Stephens was in the process of making his mixtape Minor Breaches of Discipline where he rapped over samples of some of their favourite artists (Gorillaz, Lily Allen, Arctic Monkeys) and asked Alexander-Sule to sing over some of the tracks. Realising how well their styles fitted together, they formed Rizzle Kicks in 2008. The name stems from 'Green Rizla', an early nickname given to Stephens by a football teammate after a crew of the same name from the school that he attended at the time. That nickname evolved into 'Rizzle', and the duo decided on the suffix 'kicks' due to their shared love of football.

As a newly formed duo, they hustled for beats from local producers, honing their sound, and created several bedroom demos, three of which ended up on their debut album. They also created a presence online; blogging on their website "Your Daily Kicks" as well as posting lo-fi music videos to their YouTube channel. The videos were co-directed by the band and made by Toby Lockerbie, a wedding photographer they met at a party. A video was made for a demo of "Down with the Trumpets" in the summer of 2010, closely followed by the video for "Miss Cigarette". During that time, they had finished college and Alexander-Sule went on to work as an assistant drama teacher, whilst Stephens was flipping burgers at the Corals Greyhound Stadium in Hove.

Their YouTube videos caught the attention of several record labels and in November 2010, they signed to Island Records, part of Universal Music. They continued work on their debut album and worked with several producers including Ant Whiting, Norman Cook (Fatboy Slim), The Rural, Future Cut, and Craigie Dodds.

=== 2011–2012: Stereo Typical and commercial success ===
In June 2011, the duo released a promotional single, "Prophet (Better Watch It)" accompanied by a stop motion style video made up of 960 photographic stills. The track was initially offered as a free download, before being released on iTunes. In July 2011, they learnt they had an unlikely fan, in Stephen Fry who proclaimed over Twitter that he was "unexpectedly loving the old school hip hop sounds of Rizzle Kicks." Over the summer, Rizzle Kicks played a number of festivals; they supported Dizzee Rascal at Ibiza Rocks in June and were invited back to support The Streets. They also headlined the BBC Introducing stage at Reading and Leeds 2011 after having played Radio 1's Big Weekend in May.

Their first official single, "Down with the Trumpets", was released on 12 June 2011, in the manner of on air on sale, entering the UK Singles Chart at #84 and going on to eventually peak at #8 in September 2011, having been certified gold. The single spent a total of 13 weeks in the Official Top 40. On 23 October, they released their second official single "When I Was a Youngster" which peaked at #8. Their debut album Stereo Typical was released a week later on 31 October 2011, entering the chart at #9, peaking at #5 and was certified platinum in May 2012. Their third single "Mama Do the Hump", which was produced by Norman Cook, a.k.a. Fatboy Slim, was released on 16 December, eventually peaking at #2 and has been certified platinum. The lo-fi video features a cameo from James Corden. The track spawned a dance craze known as 'The Hump' which infiltrated parties across the UK and generated many YouTube videos of members of the public doing the dance.

The pair featured on "Heart Skips a Beat" by Olly Murs, which was released on 21 August 2011, entering the chart at #1 on 28 August 2011. They have recorded remixes for artists including Ed Sheeran, Jessie J, Foster the People and Olly Murs. They made a remix video for close friend Ed Sheeran's song "You Need Me, I Don't Need You" which features Sheeran himself, and was filmed in the band's back garden in one take.

In the summer of 2012, Rizzle Kicks helped to launch the 2012–13 Arsenal away kit under the theme of Purple Reign.

Rizzle Kicks' played their first headline tour from March to May 2012, a sellout, including two nights at London's Shepherds Bush Empire. A second headline tour took place in winter 2012; they played 26 dates across the UK including O2 Academy Brixton and The Roundhouse in London. The live set up currently consists of a band including a guitarist, drummer, bass player, trumpet player with Alexander-Sule on second guitar for some songs. Their shows are characterised by high energy, dancing and bra throwing from female members of the audience. Throughout the summer of 2012, Rizzle Kicks played many major festivals across the UK, including Wakestock, T in the Park, Wireless Festival and T4 on the Beach, along with headlining the Bestival and V Festival. In July, they played a series of shows across the Southern coast of the UK as part of the Olympic Torch relay and carried the torch in Hastings. In May and late October 2012, they embarked on mini tours around Europe as well as a stint in Australia for the festival Park Life in early October.

=== 2013: Touring and Roaring 20s ===
Rizzle Kicks embarked on a US tour from January to February 2013, supporting Ed Sheeran and Foy Vance. In March, they performed alongside Labrinth at the Royal Albert Hall in March 2013 as part of the Teenage Cancer Trust shows.

Rizzle Kicks announced their second studio album Roaring 20s in June. Released on 2 September 2013 and reaching #5 on the UK Albums Chart, the album saw the return of Norman Cook and Ant Whiting as producers. The album's lead single, "Lost Generation" debuted at a peak of number 6 on the UK Singles Chart, while follow-up "Skip to the Good Bit" reached number 16.

On 4 December 2013, Rizzle Kicks released a new song, "Happy That You're Here", to their YouTube channel.

=== 2014–2021: Different projects ===
On 9 May 2014, the duo headlined the May Ball at Aberystwyth University, and the Summer Ball on 6 June 2014 at Royal Holloway, University of London. In April, Stephens (credited as Rizzle Kicks) rapped a verse on the remix of the grime track "German Whip" by Meridian Dan, which also featured Skepta, Bossman Birdie and Professor Green.

The duo diverisifed into acting in 2014, with Alexander-Sule appearing as a gang leader in the thriller The Guvnors and Stephens starring in E4 drama series Glue, broadcast 15 September to 3 November 2014.

In 2014, Rizzle Kicks released a new single "Tell Her" as part of a collaboration with Evian for the 2014 Wimbledon Championships. Reaching #14, it is the band's final chart hit to date. In October 2014, Rizzle Kicks performed Meghan Trainor's "All About That Bass" in a special music collaboration with James Corden for Channel 4's "The Feeling Nuts Comedy Night" raising awareness of testicular cancer.

In 2015, the duo performed the closing theme tune to the Shaun the Sheep Movie with Vic Reeves. They appear in an animated version of the song, viewable on YouTube. On 10 August 2015 they released a cover of Summertime by DJ Jazzy Jeff & The Fresh Prince on Spotify.

Stephens and Alexander-Sule have continued to make appearances in film and television. In March 2015, Alexander-Sule played Jimmy Sullivan in the ITV crime drama Unforgotten. Stephens appeared as a Rebel soldier in Rogue One: A Star Wars Story, released December 2016. In 2016, Stephens appeared on the second Robot Wars celebrity special. His robot Dee, a pink axlebot made in collaboration with the Terrorhurtz drivers, lost two of its fights by knockout but won the third by a split decision. In 2018, Stephens starred alongside Derren Nesbitt in Tucked, a film about a young drag queen taken in by an older drag queen who is dying of cancer. In 2021, Stephens had a recurring role in the second series of Mae Martin's sitcom Feel Good on Netflix.

Stephens has released music under the stage name Wildhood, and released his debut solo EP Vert on 16 March 2016 following the singles "Psycho Jam" and "Double Dark". He had previously released two collaborations with Mikill Pane; one, "Check", under the pseudonym of Gnarly Ventura, and the other, "Hold My Crown", under his real name. In April 2017, he used the stage name Al, the Native when featuring on The Last Skeptik's "Drumroll, Please". Since 2019, Stephens has been releasing music as Jordan Stephens, having released an EP titled P.I.G (standing for 'Pain Is Good') and his 2022 debut solo album "Let Me Die Inside You", as well as a number of non-album singles.

From 2015-2018, Alexander-Sulé released music under the stage name Jimi Charles Moody, and has released several singles. His debut single, Blue Honey, had over ninety thousand plays on SoundCloud in its first month. That song, as well as singles Other Man, Death Row and The Woman have over fifty thousand SoundCloud plays. His song House of Moody was featured in a Lexus ad and also the Madden NFL 16 soundtrack. Sulé has also released three singles as Harley Sulé, the most recent being "The Revenant" in 2021.

=== 2024–present: Reunion, Competition is for Losers and WORLD WAR FREE ===
On 2 May 2024, the duo announced that they were reuniting as Rizzle Kicks and recording together. On 30 August 2024, they released a new single, "Javelin", their first release after putting the duo on hiatus eight years prior. On 8 November the duo confirmed on their socials the release of their third studio album Competition is for Losers to be released on February 14, 2025. On 11 July 2025, they released the single Follow Excitement, featuring Rachel Chinouriri. On 12 November 2025, Green Party leader Zack Polanski made an appearance at their concert in Bristol.

On 13 November 2026 the duo announced they would be releasing their fourth studio album “WORLD WAR FREE” on January 29 2027.

== Discography ==
- Stereo Typical (2011)
- Roaring 20s (2013)
- Competition Is for Losers (2025)
- WORLD WAR FREE (2027)
