= Jam Baxter =

- Origin: London, England
- Genres: Alternative hip hop, UK hip hop, boom bap, Spoken word
- Years active: 2010–present
- Labels: Blah, High Focus

Jam Baxter is an English rapper from London. Since 2009, he has released 7 solo albums and several EPs on UK-based labels High Focus Records and, since 2019, Blah Records. He is noted for his surreal and cryptic lyrics, described variously as being "outlandish" and "vivid and disturbing".

== Style and Works ==
Baxter's first releases were as part of Brighton-based crew Contact Play. They dropped their album Champion Fraff in 2009. His first solo release was on High Focus in 2010, entitled Rinse Out Friday/Spack Out Monday. He followed that up with Gruesome Features in 2012 and So We Ate Them Whole in 2014. So We Ate Them Whole was critically praised, with reviewers calling it a "genuinely beautiful UK hip hop record" that is "quintessentially surreal and riddled in complexity". Baxter has been a long-time collaborator with producer Chemo since then.

After So We Ate Them Whole, Baxter left the UK and spent a lot of time travelling in East Asia then Central and South America. His albums written in that time, 2017's Mansion 38 and 2018's Touching Scenes, were partly inspired by those experiences. “I never stop writing, but I felt I needed to go somewhere else to make sure my output was good as it can be," he said in an interview after Mansion 38 was released.

Baxter's last release to come on High Focus was 2019's Off Piste EP. The 4 track tape came with a limited edition book of lyrics and short stories under the same title.

He has since released three albums on Blah Records, starting with a collaboration tape with Blah co-owner Lee Scott in 2019. That was followed by solo projects Obscure Liqueurs in 2021 and then 2022's Fetch the Poison. Fetch the Poison was written while Baxter was residing in the town of San Cristóbal de las Casas in Mexico. He was isolated inside for a while due the COVID-19 pandemic and the state-wide alcohol ban at the time.

Reviewers have compared Jam Baxter's lyrical style to that of the famously verbose rapper Aesop Rock or the surreal prose of writers like J.G. Ballard and William S. Burroughs.

Baxter has collaborated with Kae Tempest, Rag 'n' Bone Man, Lee Scott, The Four Owls, Jehst, Dizraeli, Verb T, Nah Eeto and many more across his career. He has released two joint projects with Dabbla and producer Ghosttown, under the name Dead Players, as well joint releases with Ed Scissor and Lee Scott.

== Discography ==
- Faster Than the Speed of Death – with Dabbla as Dead Players (2024)
- De las Sombras – with Granuja (2023)
- Fetch the Poison (2022)
- Obscure Liqueurs (2021)
- HAPPY HOUR AT THE SUPER FUN TIME PARTY DOME MEGAMIX 4000 – with Lee Scott (2019)
- Off Piste (2019)
- Touching Scenes (2018)
- Mansion 38 (2017)
- Laminated Cakes – with Ed Scissor (2017)
- Freshly Skeletal – with Dabbla as Dead Players (2015)
- ... So We Ate Them Whole (2014)
- Fresh Flesh EP (2014)
- Dead Players – with Dabbla (2013)
- The Gruesome Features (2012)
- Rinse Out Friday / Spack Out Monday (2010)
- Champion Fraff as part of Contact Play (2009)
