= Sonnyjim =

- Origin: Birmingham, England
- Genres: Hip-hop; alternative hip-hop
- Occupations: Rapper; record producer
- Years active: 2005–present
- Labels: EatGood; Daupe!; Blah
- Website: sonnyjim.bandcamp.com/music

Sonnyjim is an English rapper and hip-hop record producer. Since first releasing music in 2006 he has steadily built an underground following. Reviewers have noted his laid back delivery and lyrics of luxury and excess, alongside his consistent collaborations with prominent hip-hop artists from the US and UK.

Throughout his career he has rapped with and produced for various noted US hip-hop artists, including MF Doom, Jay Electronica, DJ Premier, Madlib, Roc Marciano and Buckwild. He has been involved with labels like Daupe! and Blah Records as well as collaborations with artists on Griselda Records like Conway the Machine and Westside Gunn.

His 2016 album Mud in My Malbec, and the 2022 release White Girl Wasted with producer The Purist, brought Sonnyjim significantly wider attention.

== Early life and career ==
Sonnyjim is from Birmingham, England, and is of Indian heritage. Reviewers have noted Sonnyjim's laid back and nonchalant vocal delivery, with intricate lyrics and themes of luxury and indulgence. His early influences include UK rappers like Skinnyman and U.S. east coast hip hop like Jay-Z, Nas and Roc Marciano.

=== 2006–2016: Early releases and Mud in My Malbec ===
He started rapping in the mid-2000s UK hip-hop scene, appearing on mixtapes alongside British artists like Stig of the Dump and Jehst. Over the years he slowly built up an underground following, with releases like 2013's Psychonaut and the Purple Patch series, as well as founding his own label EatGood Records.

In 2007, he won the UK 'End of the Weak' rap competition title. In 2008, he released Trading Standards featuring collaborations with prominent UK hip-hop artists such as Jehst, Stig of the Dump, and Soweto Kinch.

His 2016 release Mud in My Malbec, including features with New York rappers Westside Gunn and Heems, gained considerable underground attention.

=== 2016–present: White Girl Wasted and international collaborations ===
After releasing Mud in My Malbec, Sonnyjim went on to secure a run of collaborations with American rappers. In 2018, he linked up with long-term acquaintance The Purist after returning from Croatia's Outlook Festival. Their sessions resulted in the single Barz Simpson, which would eventually grow into the joint project White Girl Wasted. The song title was inspired by the cartoon character Bart Simpson, the rapper David Bars and the saxophonist Gary Bartz.

After recording Barz Simpson, the duo decided to contact MF Doom for a guest verse on a whim, as they thought the track sounded like his style. Doom liked the track and recorded a verse, but soon got back to Sonnyjim and asked to license the track for an Adult Swim compilation. He and The Purist declined, but kept the track to themselves in order to expand their collaboration into a full album release.

White Girl Wasted dropped in 2022, after the single version of Barz Simpson. The Purist's eclectic sample-based productions and Sonny's laid back punchlines, alongside the posthumous MF Doom feature, gained further attention in both US and UK hip hop media. That included positive coverage from prominent music publications like Pitchfork, Rolling Stone and The Fader. It has since seen several vinyl editions sell out including alternate covers and an instrumental version.

In 2023, Sonnyjim made an appearance for a freestyle session on New York radio's Hot 97 show Real Late with Peter Rosenberg. That year, he also released his first album on Blah Records - Ortolan and Armagnac, with Blah founder Lee Scott, and featured on Indian hip-hop duo Seedhe Maut's mixtape Lunch Break.

In 2024, Sonnyjim, Foreign Beggars member PAV4N and Indian producer Kartik, formed the rap group Pataka Boys and released their debut album Thugs from Amritsar. Sonny and PAV4N travelled to India to work with Kartik, visiting the city of Amritsar after which the project was named. It also featured guest appearances from Indian rappers like Seedhe Maut and Sikander Kahlon. Thugs From Amritsar made The Guardian’s list of Five Albums You May Have Missed in 2024. Reviewers called the album “colourful, thrilling and explosive,” and “ridiculously entertaining”, noting the cultural and lyrical shifts between English and Punjabi raps and the globally influenced soundscapes.

== Discography ==
=== EPs ===
Sources:

- Soul Trader E.P. (2005)
- Trading Standards CD (2008)
- The Purple Patch (2010)
- The Psychonaut EP (2011)
- The Executive Branch (2012) with Wizard
- How To Tame Lions (2014) with Leaf Dog
- Death by Misadventure (2018) with Conway the Machine
- Money Green Leather Sofa (2018) with Camouflage Monk
- Spencer for Higher (2018) with Vic Spencer
- Spencer for Higher 2 (2019) with Vic Spencer
- No Visible Means Of Income (2020) with Giallo Point
- The Chemistry Must Be Respected (2020) with Illinformed
- Tailor Made Ostrich (2020) with Must Volkoff
- A Joint Venture (2021) with Kev Brown
- Coke Le Roc (2021) with Buckwild
- Polo Palace (2021) with Juganaut and Da Flyy Hooligan
- Porridge (2021) with Robert and The Purist
- The Real Bobby Dazzler (2021)
- New Phone Who Dis (2021) with Machacha
- Spencer for Higher 4 (2021) with Vic Spencer
- No Visible Means of Income 2 (2022) with Giallo Point
- Ortolan and Armagnac (2023) with Lee Scott
- Exotic Peng Collection (2024)
- Effortless, Almost Dead (2025) with Kong The Artisan
- Less Labour More Fruit (2025) with Morlockko Plus
- Soli Deo Gloria (2025) with Homeboy Sandman
- Golden Parachute (2025) with Morriarchi
- Chinatown Chicken Tour (2026) with Sumgii
- Rod Ford (2026) with Lee Scott
- Mud in Malbec (Remixes) (2026)
- Leman Lake Pyramids (2026) with Sebb Bash

=== Singles ===
- Barz Simpson (2022) – Featuring MF Doom & Jay Electronica
- Dude, Where’s My Car? (2023) with Lee Scott
- Life Is Great (2023)
- Chun King (2024) with Statik Selektah
- Bappi Lahiri (2024) as Pataka Boys
- Megaloblast (2024) as Pataka Boys
- Triple Beams (2024)
