= White Girl Wasted =

Studio album by Sonnyjim, The Purist
- Released: September 6, 2022
- Length: 20 minutes
- Label: Daupe!
- Producer: The Purist; Madlib; DJ Premier

White Girl Wasted is a studio album by rapper Sonnyjim and producer The Purist. It was released on The Purist's Daupe! record label on 6 September 2022.

The album was well received in the music media. Reviewers praised Sonnyjim's "quotable" raps of indulgence and excess over The Purist's eclectic, sample-based productions, as well as the list of notable features including beats from Madlib, DJ Premier and a posthumous rap verse from MF Doom.

Positive reviews came from Pitchfork, Mojo, Rolling Stone and Clash Magazine among others.

== Writing and recording ==
Sonnyjim and The Purist spent almost four years working on White Girl Wasted. The duo first began recording sessions in 2018, after returning from Outlook festival in Croatia.

The first song they recorded was the eventual first single, "Barz Simpson". The duo sent the track to MF Doom, who recorded a verse and sent it back – before asking to license it for an Adult Swim compilation. Sonnyjim and the Purist declined, and decided to build their upcoming album around it.

Over four years the duo recorded more than 70 tracks, before cutting it down to just eight for the final release. They also recruited Jay Electronica and Blah Records founder Lee Scott for feature rap verses and procured beats from Madlib and DJ Premier. The album's artwork features cartoon character Homer Simpson in an inebriated state, surrounded by drug paraphernalia and food.

The first single "Bars Simpson" with MF Doom and Jay Electronica was released in August. It later had a vinyl release and an accompanying music video, featuring actor Leigh Gill.

== Release and reception ==
Professional ratings
Review scores
Source	Rating
Loud and Quiet	8/10 stars
Pitchfork	6.8/10

Sonnyjim has said in interviews the initial release of White Girl Wasted on vinyl sold out very shortly after release. It has since been rereleased on vinyl with an alternate cover, also selling out, as well as an instrumental version released in 2023. The album received widely positive reviews in the music media.

Critics praised Sonnyjim's "eye for quotables and his lethal nonchalance" and "The Purist's lush, sample-heavy production".

Reviewers also noted the tight, quality controlled run time of just 20 minutes. "There is no debris here, no room for filler sonics or throwaway bars," said Clash Magazine.

Loud and Quiet rated the album eight out of ten, while Pitchfork gave it a 6.8 score, describing it as "a nostalgic ode to druggy hedonism and classic boom-bap."

== Track listing ==
No.	Title	Length
1.	"Paris Hilton"	1:04
2.	"Barz Simpson" (featuring MF Doom and Jay Electronica)	3:35
3.	"Doc Ellis" (produced by DJ Premier)	2:44
4.	"No Face No Case"	2:35
5.	"Does Mushrooms Once" (produced by Madlib)	2:01
6.	"Lemmon714"	2:35
7.	"999" (featuring Lee Scott and Milkavelli)	3:44
8.	"Buy Cocaine Not Art"	2:40
Total length:		21:08
