= The Return of the Drifter =

Studio album by Jehst
- Released: 2002
- Genre: Hip hop
- Length: 36:58 minutes
- Label: Low Life
- Producers: Jehst, Harry Love

Jehst chronology
Premonitions EP (1999)	The Return of the Drifter (2002)	Falling Down (2003)

Professional ratings
Review scores
Source	Rating
The-Mag	4.5/5 stars
RapReviews	(9/10)

The Return of the Drifter is the debut studio album by English rapper Jehst, originally released in 2002 via Low Life Records. The album was produced almost entirely by Jehst, with the exception of the tracks "Alcoholic Author" and "Staircase to Stage" which were produced by Harry Love.

Since its release, The Return of the Drifter has become known as a classic in the UK hip-hop scene and is widely regarded as one of the most important UK hip-hop albums of all time. It is commonly accepted to include some of Jehst's finest music in terms of both lyrical content and production work. It features largely acclaimed UK hip-hop classics such as "High Plains Anthem", "1979", "Staircase to Stage" and "People Under the Weather", which features Asaviour, a longtime collaborator of Jehst (both spent their teens as close friends in Huddersfield).

== Track listing ==
1. "High Plains Anthem"
2. "Skit"
3. "City of Industry"
4. "Bluebells"
5. "1979"
6. "The Trilogy" (featuring Ricochet and Tommy Evans)
7. "Alcoholic Author"
8. "Staircase to Stage" (featuring J-Zone)
9. "The Return of the Drifter"
10. "People Under the Weather" (featuring Asaviour)
11. "The Trilogy" (remix) (featuring Chester P and Kyza)
