= Forest DLG =

- David L. G. Webb aka Forest DLG

Background information
- Also known as: Forest DLG, Chemo, Telemachus
- Born: David L. G. Webb; 21 September 1984 (age 41)
- Origin: London, England
- Genres: Hip hop, trip hop, downtempo, world
- Occupation(s): Producer, Sound Engineer
- Years active: 1999–present
- Labels: High Focus Records; Sony Music; Pickwick; YNR
- Website: http://www.kmj45.com

David L. G. Webb, formerly known as Chemo, is an English music producer and DJ. He has also released several albums under the pseudonym 'Telemachus'. As a sound engineer he has worked at the forefront of the British Hip Hop scene, acting as chief engineer for YNR Productions and High Focus Records. Chemo was recognised by the Guardian newspaper as a man who "has helped British music move along more than most people will ever know".

== Career ==
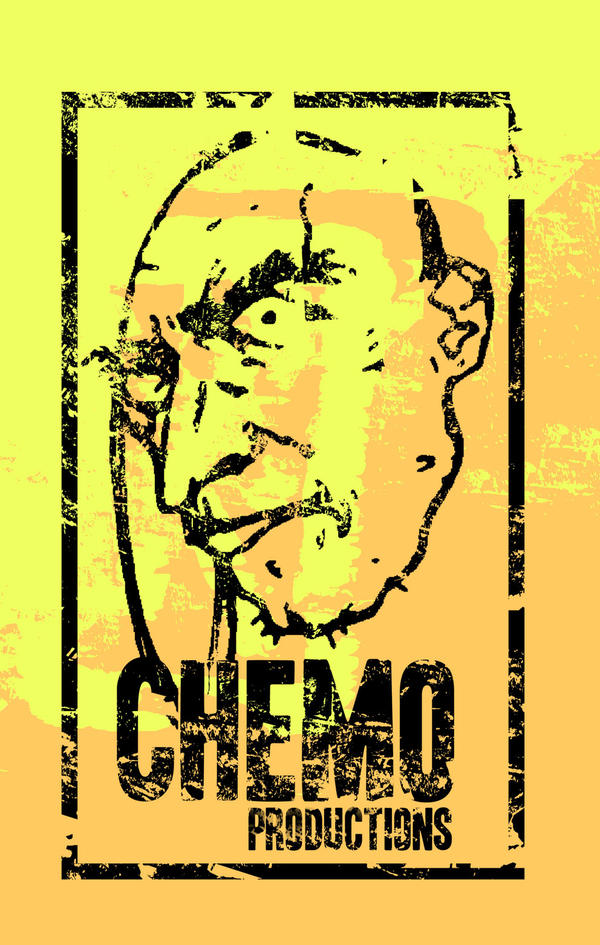
Early Chemo Productions Logo

=== 2004–2011: Early years ===
Chemo first started as a producer and DJ for London Hip Hop group Frontline. He helped found legendary Hip Hop night 'Speakers Corner' in Brixton. Off the back of Speakers Corner, Chemo worked on albums for Verb T, Kyza, Kashmere, Manage, Jehst, Triple Darkness and others.

In 2007, Chemo produced a compilation album titled Squirrelz With Gunz, alongside World DMC champion DJ Skully. A second compilation of his work between 2007 and 2011 entitled The Stomach of the Mountain was released in 2011.

=== 2011–2021 ===
Chemo continued to produce for numerous vocalists and was lauded in particular for executive producing albums for Jam Baxter and Onoe Caponoe on High Focus Records.

Telemachus is a pseudonym used for Webb's solo projects and to allow him to be "a little more artful.". The debut release was a 7" Vinyl entitled 'Scarecrows' featuring Roc Marciano. This was taken from the 'In The Evening' album which was awarded album of the month by Q Magazine and named one of the albums of the year by The Quietus. Telemachus followed up this album by travelling to North Africa in 2014 to create his 'In Morocco' album.

In April 2020, Telemachus signed to High Focus Records and released the album Boring & Weird Historical Music

=== 2021–present ===
At the start of 2021, he announced via Twitter that he was retiring the pseudonym Chemo and would be known as Forest DLG.

== Style ==
Early productions often mirrored pioneers such as Pete Rock, Havoc, Alchemist, J Dilla, El-P, and Rza - eventually evolving into a more nuanced and varied style - "From beautifully shuffling jazz drums to sinister synths to delicately plucked strings, he displays a vast knowledge of music and an ear for off the wall styles."

The birth of Telemachus gave him the opportunity to call upon far wider influences (psychedelic rock, dancehall, blues, West African Highlife) that led journalist Neil Kulkarni to describe Chemo as "an ancient, modern and unique voice in British Music".

== Discography ==
=== Studio albums ===
- 2007 - Chemo - Squirrelz With Gunz
- 2010 - Chemo - The Stomach of the Mountain
- 2011 - Telemachus - Scarecrows ft. Roc Marciano
- 2013 - Telemachus - In the Evening
- 2014 - Telemachus - In Morocco
- 2020 - Telemachus - Boring & Weird Historical Music

=== Collaborative ===
- 2008 - Triple Darkness - Anathema
- 2014 - Jam Baxter - ...so we ate them whole
- 2015 - Onoe Caponoe - Tales from Planet Cattele
- 2017 - Jam Baxter - Mansion 38
- 2018 - Jam Baxter - Touching Scenes
- 2021 - Dead Silk - Dead Silk I and II
- 2022 - Jam Baxter - Fetch The Poison
