= Biro Funk =

Studio album by Braintax
- Released: 1 December 2001
- Genre: British hip hop
- Label: Low Life Records (LOW15)
- Producer: Braintax, Ben Grymm, Harry Love, Farma G, C-Swing, Jehst, Benny Live-O

Braintax chronology
| Biro Funk (2001) | Panorama (2006) |

Biro Funk is the debut studio album by Braintax, released on Low Life Records in 2001. By the time of the album's release, Braintax was a solo artist - Joseph Christie. Prior to the release of Biro Funk, Braintax had released a number of EPs and 12" singles, originally as a two-piece band. The album was recorded at Christie's own Low Life Records studio in Shepherd's Bush. It features guest appearances from other stars of UK hip hop and scratches performed by DJ Harry Love of the Scratch Perverts.

In the long writing process for this album, Christie recorded over 40 tracks, most of which were dismissed and only the strongest made the final cut.

== Track listing ==
1. Don't Drag Me In (featuring Mystro)
2. Opening Titles (featuring Skinnyman)
3. Futureghost
4. Godnose (featuring Task Force)
5. Last Date
6. Speak Your Mind
7. Biro Funk
8. Cobblestones
9. The Grip
10. Peace
11. Oceans
12. Escuchame
13. Riviera Hustle (featuring Jehst)
14. Exit
