= Black Josh =

English rapper and songwriter

- Origin: Manchester, UK
- Genres: Hip hop, Boom bap, Alternative rap
- Occupations: Rapper, songwriter
- Label: Blah Records

Black Josh is a rapper from Manchester, England. Since his first releases in 2013, Josh has worked with various producers and rappers across the UK including other Blah Records artists. He has also been part of the rap groups Cult of the Damned, Levelz and The Mouse Outfit. Writers have variously called him a "Manchester cult hero" and a "lyrical maverick".

== Works and style ==
Black Josh first started rapping over hip-hop beats while at college sometime before 2011. His first releases to gain traction came with The Mouse Outfit in 2013, followed by his Black Josh EP. In 2014–15, Josh began to release on Blah Records, starting with the single Paul Scholes. He has since dropped 8 releases on Blah. They have included the 2018 album Yung Sweg Lawd, featuring production from Skepta, and 2020's Mannyfornia. Reviewers praised Mannyfornia as "unapologetically Manchester" and a "cohesive, dynamic and eclectic album".

In 2019, Josh's releases were selected for inclusion in the British Library's Sound and Moving Image Catalogue alongside other Blah artists.

In 2024, he was the opener for Danny Brown's British leg of the "Quaranta" tour and was minted.

== Discography ==
=== Albums and EPs ===
- Today's the Day (2023)
- Cult of The Damned - CULTGANGRAPSH!T, Vol. 1 (2023)
- Swegasus with Milkavelli (2022)
- Heartbreak Hostel (2021)
- Mannyfornia (2021)
- Yung Sweg Lawd (2018)
- Cult of The Damned - Part Deux: Brick Pelican Posse Crew Gang Syndicate (2018)
- Attack of the 50,000 ft SWEG LAWDS from OUTER SPACE w/Lee Scott (2018)
- Ape Tape (2016)
- Cult of The Damned - 'Cult of The Damned' (2015)
- Smoking Kills w/Pete Cannon (2015)
- The Blosh EP (2014)
- #blahblahblackjosh (2014)
