= Panorama (Braintax album) =

Studio album by Braintax
- Released: 23 October 2006
- Genre: British hip hop
- Length: 43:51
- Label: Low Life Records (LOW46)
- Producer: Beat Butcha, Louis Slipperz, Braintax, Bengrymm, Tejota, Ghost, Elmore Judd, Copperpot.

Braintax chronology
Biro Funk (2001)	Panorama (2006)	My Last and Best Album (20086)

Professional ratings
Review scores
Source	Rating
BBC	(Mixed)

Panorama is the second studio album by Braintax, released in 2006.

== Track listing ==
1. "All I Need" - 3.33
2. "Can We Skit" - 1.22
3. "Syriana Style" - 3.38
4. "Monsoon Funk" - 3.41
5. "Good or Bad" (featuring Mystro) - 3.42
6. "Anti-Grey" (featuring Dubbledge) - 2.59
7. "Last Tenner" - 3.35
8. "The Grip Again" (a day in the life of a suicide bomber) - 4.07
9. "Pick a Subject" (featuring Verb T) - 2.57
10. "Decade" - 3.57
11. "Run the Yards" - 3.45
12. "Back to the Riviera" - 2.58
13. "Exit Plans" - 3.42
