= The Sagas Of... =

Studio album by Klashnekoff
- Released: 15 June 2004
- Recorded: 2004
- Genre: British hip hop
- Length: 50:04
- Label: Kemet Entertainment
- Producer: Harry Love; Joe Buddha; Lewis Parker; L. Dolo; AC.WAR.ION

Klashnekoff chronology
The Sagas Of... (2004)	Lionheart: Tussle with the Beast (2007)

Professional ratings
Review scores
Source	Rating
stylusmagazine	B+
UKhh	(favourable)
rapreviews	(9/10)

The Sagas Of... is the debut studio album by English rapper Klashnekoff, released on 15 June 2004 by Kemet Entertainment. Three singles were released, "Its Murda", "All I Got", and "Parrowdice". "Its Murda" appeared in the soundtrack to the film Kidulthood.

== Track listing ==
No.	Title	Producer(s)	Length
1.	"Intro (Skit)"		1:50
2.	"Zero"	Lewis Parker	4:01
3.	"It's Murda"	Harry Love	5:01
4.	"Jankrowville"	L. Dolo	5:26
5.	"Parrowdice" (featuring Kyza and Skriblah)	Harry Love	5:52
6.	"B 4 U Die" (featuring Kyza and Skriblah)	Joe Buhdha	4:09
7.	"All I Got"	Joe Buhdha	4:00
8.	"Black Rose"	Joe Buhdha	4:04
9.	"Lynching (Skit)"		1:12
10.	"Our Time"	Lewis Parker	3:56
11.	"Terra Firma Anthum (Skit)"		0:52
12.	"Daggo Mentality"	Lewis Parker	4:01
13.	"Neighbour (Skit)"		0:46
14.	"Son of Niah"	AC.WAR.ION	4:54
Total length:			50:04
