= Travel Show =

Travel Show could refer to a travel documentary, a genre of television show. The term may also refer to:

- The Travel Show (TV series), a British television series
- The Travel Show, a 1999 EP by Braintax
