= Skip to the Good Bit =

2013 single by Rizzle Kicks

Single by Rizzle Kicks featuring Emily Phillips

from the album Roaring 20s
- Released: 25 October 2013
- Recorded: 2013
- Genre: British hip hop; dance-pop
- Length: 3:18
- Label: Universal Island
- Songwriters: Jordan Stephens, Harley Alexander-Sule, Ant Whiting, Emily Phillips
- Producer: Ant Whiting

Rizzle Kicks featuring Emily Phillips singles chronology
"Lost Generation" (2013)	"Skip to the Good Bit" (2013)	"Happy That You're Here" (2013)

"Skip to the Good Bit" is a song by English hip hop duo Rizzle Kicks. The song was released as a digital download in the United Kingdom on 25 October 2013 as the second single from their second studio album, Roaring 20s (2013). The song features uncredited vocals from Emily Phillips, who also co-wrote the song.

Written by Jordan Stephens, Harley Alexander-Sule, Ant Whiting and Phillips, the song peaked at number 16 on the UK Singles Chart. It also interpolates and uses the melody of the song "Unbelievable" by EMF. In 2013, the song was used in an advert for Strictly Come Dancing, and also played over the end credits of the film adaption of Gangsta Granny.

== Music video ==
A music video to accompany the release of "Skip to the Good Bit" was first released onto YouTube on 9 October 2013 at a total length of four minutes and five seconds. The music video is set in a school where the duo play students in a science class. After the teacher leaves with one of the female teachers and makes out with her in a cupboard and are caught out by the janitors, the duo make a love potion which the other students drink and causes them to start kissing each other. The duo then leave the classroom and go off to the staff room where an end of term party is being held and they spike the punch with the potion and the guests drink and dance along to the song. The duo also play other characters in the video, Jordan plays the science teacher while Harley plays one of the school's janitors alongside British actor Will Poulter. The video also features Irish TV presenter Laura Whitmore and actress Gemma Atkinson as guests at the party.

== Track listing ==
Promotional CD single
No.	Title	Length
1.	"Skip to the Good Bit"	3:17

Digital download – remix No. 1
No.	Title	Length
1.	"Skip to the Good Bit" (Federico Scavo remix)	4:40

Digital download – remix No. 2
No.	Title	Length
1.	"Skip to the Good Bit" (Cahill remix)	3:14

== Credits and personnel ==
- Lead vocals – Rizzle Kicks
- Lyrics – Jordan Stephens, Harley Alexander-Sule, Ant Whiting, Emily Phillips
- Producers – Ant Whiting
- Labels – Universal Island

== Charts ==
Chart (2013)	Peak position
Ireland (IRMA)	38
Scotland Singles (OCC)	16
UK Singles (OCC)	16

== Certifications ==
Region	Certification	Certified units/sales
United Kingdom (BPI)	Gold	400,000^{‡}
^{‡} Sales+streaming figures based on certification alone.

== Release history ==
Region	Date	Format	Label
United Kingdom	25 October 2013	Digital download	Universal Island
