= Lionheart: Tussle with the Beast =

Studio album by Klashnekoff
- Released: 26 February 2007
- Recorded: 2006
- Genre: British hip hop
- Length: 51:14
- Label: Riddim Killa • Low Life
- Producer: Joe Buddha

Klashnekoff chronology
The Sagas Of... (2004)	Lionheart: Tussle with the Beast (2007)	Back to the Sagas (2010)

Professional ratings
Review scores
Source	Rating
BBC Music	favorable link
musicOMH	link
UK Hip Hop	(6/10) link
RapReviews	(7/10) link
Stylus	(B+) link
P.I.F.R.	4/5 stars

Lionheart: Tussle with the Beast is the second studio album by the English rapper Klashnekoff, released in 2007 on Riddim Killa Records. It was produced by Joe Buddha. It charted at No. 105 on the UK Albums Chart.

On his next studio album Back to the Sagas, Klashnekoff dismissed Lionheart as a purely financially motivated project and described his difficult relationship with Buddha, "To keep it real, I was never feeling that album from day one. 'Cause that weren't my ting...just something me and Buhdha should have got paid for. But it took over a year and a half so between me and Buddha it caused complications. Six months past there was no conversation, just pure back and forth hating. Then a phone call got made and it was all ended in one conversation."

== Track listing ==
#	Title	Featured guest(s)	Producer(s)	Length
1	"Intro"			1:45
2	"Revolution (Will Not Be Televised on Channel U)"		Joe Buhdha	4:06
3	"My Rights Like My Life (Skit)"			0:17
4	"My Life"		Joe Buhdha	3:41
5	"Terrorise The City"	Kool G Rap & Kyza	Joe Buhdha	4:05
6	"Refuse To Die"		Joe Buhdha	3:46
7	"Question"		Joe Buhdha	3:15
8	"Sayonara"	Skriblah & Kyza	Joe Buhdha	4:23
9	"Music Is His...(Skit)"			0:42
10	"Bit By Bit"		Joe Buhdha	3:32
11	"Rest Of Our Lives (Black Rose 2)"	Honey Williams	Joe Buhdha	4:26
12	"Lord Help Me (Skit)"			0:26
13	"Can't You See?"	Honey Williams	Joe Buhdha	4:06
14	"Two Guns Blazing"	45	Joe Buhdha	4:00
15	"Bun Dem"	Capleton	Joe Buhdha	4:13
16	"Make P's"	Skriblah & Honey Williams	Joe Buhdha	3:36
17	"Outro"			0:54
