= Andover Estate =

Housing estate in Holloway, London

Coordinates: 51°33′47″N 0°06′52″W

Roth Walk on Andover Estate

The Andover Estate, in Holloway, North London, is a large Islington London Borough Council housing estate which is flanked by Hornsey Road (west), Seven Sisters Road (south), Durham Road (east) and Birnam Road (north). It falls into the N7 postcode district of London.

== Rebuilding Holloway in the 1950s and 1960s ==
The older part of the estate along Andover Road was built in 1938. The newer buildings, which make up the majority of the estate, were built from 1973 to 1979.

This area of Holloway was rebuilt after streets of old housing were knocked down in the 1960s. When the estate was built it was seen as a model housing estate, and provided over 1000 homes in an area of high deprivation.

Three large uniquely designed triangular buildings rise into the sky on the estate, named Didbin, Noll and Docura Houses respectively, after local architects. Some of the blocks of dwellings were named after railway junctions: Andover, Barmouth, Chard, Methley, Rainford and Yeovil.

Many similar estates being built at the same time. Nearby Elthorne Estate was designed quite similarly in the mid-1970s but unlike Andover's three big blocks didn't have any high rise development.

Other nearby housing estates, Six Acres Estate, Harvist Estate, and Elthorne Estate were built when it was considered more viable to modernise rather than rebuild after the area suffered bomb damage some twenty five years earlier in World War II.

== "Beyond the hoodie" ==
The estate was subject to a 2007 ITV documentary in which an MP, Ann Widdecombe, spent a night in one of the flats to highlight the supposed problem of youths causing trouble. The youth of Andover Estate then got together with a London film maker, Michelle Golding , to produce a film rebutting the Ann Widdecombe programme. Young residents put across their side of the story to demonstrate that they are more likely to be victims of crime than perpetrators.

The film highlights the actual reduction in crime on the estate over the last couple of years and the problem of much of the crime being committed by non-residents. It also discusses the negative impact created by what is described as the sloppy journalism of the Ann Widdecombe film.

== Overview / Trivia ==
The estate has various well known residents in former EastEnders TV actor Marc Bannerman, renowned close-up magician and artiste Fay Presto also lived there for over 25 years.

UK rapper Skinnyman grew up on the nearby Six Acres Estate and also spent time on the Andover Estate. His highly acclaimed album Council Estate of Mind is about his upbringing in this area. One half of popular house / garage music duo Truesteppers, Andy Lysandrou grew up on Andover Estate as well.

John Lydon (a.k.a. Johnny Rotten) also grew up on the nearby Six Acres Estate.

On the edge of the estate on Sonderburg Road by Seven Sisters Road is Harmsworth hospital, (named and built after Sir Harold Harmsworth) an animal hospital run by the RSPCA, which was the focal point of the television reality TV series Animal Hospital, and was presented by the now disgraced TV personality Rolf Harris. The informative and educational series ran for nine years on the BBC.

A segment on The Catherine Tate Show was filmed on Selden Walk, and the 2015 comedy Chewing Gum was also partly filmed on the estate
