= Squirrelz with Gunz =

Squirrelz With Gunz

Studio album by Chemo and DJ Skully
- Released: July 16, 2007
- Genre: British hip hop
- Label: Altered Ego / Pickwick
- Producers: Verb T, Chemo, DJ IQ.

Squirrelz With Gunz is a compilation of tracks produced by Chemo released July 2007. It is the first Solo release by Chemo.

It was rated a 7.5 out of 10 by Grant Jones of RapReviews.com.

== Track listing ==
1. Intro - DJ Skully
2. Karma - Karizma
3. Divine Communication - Kashmere & Iron Braydz
4. New Day - Toplinerz
5. Sin City - Kyza & D.Ablo
6. 5 7 - Tony D & The Therapist
7. Heard About Me - Ali Vegas
8. Heresy - Triple Darkeness & Kyza
9. For Heaven's Sake - Kashmere
10. Cold - Skriblah & M9
11. Soul Survive - Verb T
12. City Of Satan - Manage & CLG
13. Snakes And Ladders - Triple Darkness
14. Here I Am - Poisonous Poets
15. Paranoid Music - Mr. Dragstick & Stylah, Iron Braydz
16. Speaker's Corner - Manage & Guests
17. Firey Red - Blind Alphabetz & Sean Price
18. Not In My Name - Chain Of Command
19. Fight Klub - Kyza
20. Give It Up - Mr. Drastick
21. Sitting Here - Magda Sinit
