= Cult of the Damned =

English rap group

- Origin: England
- Genres: UK hip hop, alternative hip hop
- Label: Blah Records
- Members: Lee Scott, Salar, BeTheGun, Black Josh, Sly Moon, Stinkin Slumrok, Bisk, Bill Shakes, Sniff, King Grubb, Tony Broke, Sleazy F Baby
- Past members: Milkavelli
- Website: https://blahrecords.com/pages/cult-of-the-damned

Cult of the Damned are an English rap group, with a shifting line up of a dozen-plus rappers and producers including Lee Scott, Salar and Black Josh. Formerly known as Children of the Damned they have been releasing music since 2007's album Tourretes Camp, all through various incarnations of Blah Records.

== Style and Works ==
Reviewers have compared the "haunted, dark" stylings and "air of unpredictability" around Cult of the Damned, to the legendary US rap crew Wu Tang Clan.

The first Cult of the Damned album under the new name was 2015's Cult of the Damned. Their 2018 album Part Deux: Brick Pelican Posse Crew Gang Syndicate, featured in DJ Mag's Top 50 Albums of 2018 list. Reviewers called the album "beautifully executed wrongness" by "some of the most innovative and exciting artists the UK has to offer". In 2021, they released their album The Church Of. In early 2023, they released their latest album CULTGANGRAPSH!T, Vol. 1.

The crew have played at venues and festivals across Europe, including Boomtown festival and several headline shows at London's Jazz Cafe.

In 2018, the British Library offered to preserve all Cult of the Damned releases for posterity (as part of Blah Records). Their releases will be stored, in digital format, in the library's Sound and Moving Image Catalogue of British culture.
