= Nuke Proof Suit =

EP by Jehst
- Released: October 24, 2005
- Genre: UK hip-hop
- Length: 33:46
- Label: Reprezent
- Producer: Jehst

Jehst chronology
Falling Down (2003)	Nuke Proof Suit (2005)	The Dragon of an Ordinary Family (2011)

Nuke Proof Suit is an EP by British hip hop artist Jehst. This release reveals evidence of a new style in terms of production and lyrics, as the EP takes a more 'catchy' approach with rhythmic hooks and 'rap-a-long' style rhymes. Jehst confirmed this in an interview with ukhh.com in July 2005, when he described the forthcoming EP as "...more moving it [in] the direction of sound over content in a way."

== Track listing ==
All tracks are written and produced by Jehst with the exception of "Pepper Spray" which is written by Jehst, Kashmere and Sir Smurf Lil.

1. "Vice City"
2. "Ape Shit"
3. "Nuke Proof Suit"
4. "Neck Breakin"
5. "Magnum Force"
6. "Pepper Spray" (featuring Kashmere and Sir Smurf Lil)
7. "Hydroblowback"
8. "Work Ethic"
