= Skinnyman =

British rapper (born 1974)

- Born: Alexander Graham Holland; 9 November 1974 (age 51); Leeds, Yorkshire, England
- Origin: Finsbury Park, London
- Genres: Hip hop, jazz, folk
- Label: Low Life
- Website: www.skinnyman.co.uk

Skinnyman (born Alexander Graham Holland, 9 November 1974) is a British rapper who was born in Chapeltown, Leeds, Yorkshire and moved to Finsbury Park, London at a young age. He is best known for his sole album Council Estate of Mind.

== Biography ==
Skinnyman was born in 1974 in Chapeltown, Leeds. He moved to London with his mother and two siblings at the age of ten. The family lived on the Six Acres Estate next to Andover Estate. Among his friends was fellow Leeds-born, London-raised Cornwall DJ Pat Mckay.

In the early 1990s, he was part of the Bury Crew. Later he formed the Mud Family with Mongo, Chester P and Farma G. The group which released a number of EPs including the Mud Family EP in 2002. They also released "Itchy Town" and "Lash Suttin", a reworking of Redman's "Smash Something". Later Mr. Ti2bs, Uncle Festa and more joined the group.

Skinnyman appeared in the first episode of Tower Block Dreams, aired in January 2004. It was a documentary series on BBC Three which looked into the underground music scene in council estates.

=== Council Estate of Mind (2004 - present) ===
Skinnyman released his sole solo album, Council Estate of Mind in 2004. The album was released on Low Life Records in 2004, shortly before Skinnyman was again incarcerated. It spent two weeks in the official album chart, with a peak position of number 65. Notably many samples on the album are taken from the 1982 television play Made in Britain.

He played a small part in the 2005 interactive TV series Dubplate Drama.

In 2011, Skinnyman was sentenced sixteen months for threatening his ex-girlfriend and damaging her car.

Skinnyman claimed in a 2019 interview with The Face to have "never been paid a penny to this day from Council Estate of Mind."

== Discography ==
=== Studio albums ===
List of studio albums, with selected details and chart positions
Title	Details	Peak chart positions		
Title	Details	UK	UK R&B	UK Ind.
Council Estate of Mind	Released: 9 August 2004; Label: Low Life Records; Formats: CD, digital download	65	15	6

=== Singles and EPs ===
- Fuck the Hook EP (2003, Low Life)
- No Big Ting / Council Estate of Mind (2004, Low Life)
- I'll Be Surprised / Never Gonna Happen (2004, Low Life)
- Creatures of the Night / My Life in Rhymes (2004, PM Muzik)
- Forever Rangers / Not Bonnie & Clyde (Instrumentals) - Skinnyman & DJ Flip (2005, Netgroove)
- Sensi Skank - Ruben da Silva feat. Skinnyman & Manasseh (2011, RR008)
- Music Speaks Louder Than Words (2011)
- Ya Fool - K*ners & Skinnyman (2022)

=== Guest appearances ===
- The London Convention – The London Allstars (single), 1997
- New Mic Order – Task Force, 1999
- putt the word out – mystro & jargon, 1999 deal real records
- U.S.S.R. Life from the Other Side – DJ Vadim, 1999
- The Unknown – Mark B & Blade, 2000
- Twilight Of The Gods – Skitz (single), 2000
- Word Lab – Various Artists, 2000
- Big Tings We Inna – Rodney P (single), 2001
- Biro Funk – Braintax, 2001
- Countryman – Skitz, 2001
- The Legacy: Episode 1 – Various Artists, 2001
- Bang Y2K – DJ Vadim (single), 2002
- U.S.S.R. The Art Of Listening – DJ Vadim, 2002
- Straight Outta Botley- WESTWOOD VOLUME 2, 2002
- Asylum Speakers – Foreign Beggars, 2003
- Civilians – Dark Circles, 2003
- The World According to RZA – Various Artists, 2003
- Basementality EP (Part 1) – Underground Alliance, 2004
- Elementz Universe Vol. 1 – The Elementz (single), 2004
- Have Patience – Karl Hinds, 2004
- Lets Av It – Karl Hinds Feat. Skinnyman 2004
- When I Give My Heart To You – DJ Mentat (single), 2004
- Bar Fight – First Rate (single), 2005
- Fame And Money – The Booty Bouncers (single), 2005
- Skitz Homegrown Vol. 2 – Various Artists, 2005
- Tip of Da Mysberg Volume 1 – Mystro, 2005
- Up Your Speed (remix) – Sway, 2005
- The Whole Nine - Sway, Life & Skinnyman 2006
- U Must Learn - Skinnyman, KRS-One, Paradise 2006
- Change Your Heart – Nemesis & Arrogance Real Records, 2006
- One Less Gun – Delta, The Lostralian LP 2006
- Another Day – Angela Lawriw, 2006
- Shakespeare (remix) Akala
- The Boy Who Cried Wolf – Dap C feat. Skinnyman & S.Kalibre NGU Records, 2006
- Down – Lunar C, 2017
- Thriller - Fliptrix (Prod. Joe Corfield) High Focus Records, 2019
- Jack - RATS, When I Say Run Records, 2019
- All In Together - Ricky Lix feat. Cappadonna, Skinnyman & Harry Ixer (2021)
- TrueMendous - Yourself or The World?(Prod. Illinformed) High Focus Records, 2022
- Price of Love - Blacksmith, 2022
