= Pete Cannon =

British music producer

- Birth name: Peter Buchanan
- Born: Blackpool, UK
- Genres: Jungle; house; hip hop
- Occupations: Musician; producer; DJ; vocalist
- Years active: 2012–present
- Labels: *N4; RLD; Hospital

Peter Buchanan, known professionally as Pete Cannon, is a British jungle, house and hip hop music producer, DJ and vocalist, who uses retro hardware such as Amiga, Akai S900, and Roland Juno-106 and software such as OctaMED.

He is originally from Blackpool, but now lives in London where he runs the record label N4 records. He also runs Melonskin Records with Dirty Dike https://www.melonskinrecords.co.uk/

Pete has worked with Inja, Guilty Simpson, Dr Syntax, Sway, Stig of the Dump, Magestik Legend, Kyza, Foreign Beggars, Yogi, Sonny Jim, Deadline and Jim Raygun, Kid Genius, MC Shaun Traynor, Kris Psychotik Liberati, Snap, and D Strong, as well as producing two tracks on Rizzle Kicks' album Roaring 20s including the hit single Lost Generation. He has released on several record labels: High Focus, Hospital Records, N4 Records, Kniteforce and Swamp 81.

He also produces music for advertisements, including for companies like Apple and Adidas, and his tracks have been featured in many others, such as ITV's Euro 2020 advertisement.
