= The Dragon of an Ordinary Family =

Studio album by Jehst
- Released: 19 June 2011
- Recorded: 2004–2011
- Genre: UK hip hop
- Length: 55:08
- Label: YNR Productions
- Producer: Jehst, LG, Mr. Thing, Chemo, Beat Butcha, Jon Phonics, Zygote

Jehst chronology
Nuke Proof Suit (2005)	The Dragon of an Ordinary Family (2011)

Singles from The Dragon of an Ordinary Family
- 1. "Starting Over" Released: 5 April 2011

The Dragon of an Ordinary Family is an album by British hip-hop artist Jehst, released on his label YNR Productions, on 19 June 2011. This release is his first in six years since 2005's Nuke Proof Suit.

== Background ==
Work for the album dates back to the Nuke Proof Suit sessions, as one or two tracks were held back for this release; causing Jehst to refer to the album as "[being] like a scrapbook..."

== Album title ==
The title is from "an old kids' picture book" (by Margaret Mahy and Helen Oxenbury, London: Heinemann, 1969).

Jehst described the title of the album as "the juxtaposition of ‘Dragon’ with ‘Ordinary Family’. You’ve got references to everyday mundane shit that everyone can relate to, but at the same time there’s something otherworldly about it and something that’s kind of fantastical and people can’t quite put their finger on. It’s that mixture of the everyday with the surreal."

== Recording ==
The album features no guest appearances, but boasts production appearances from Jehst himself, long term Jehst collaborators LG and Mr. Thing, veteran producer Beat Butcha and new producers Zygote, Jon Phonics and Chemo.

== Promotion ==
The first single from the album, "Starting Over", was launched by a viral marketing video campaign in which a supposed Jehst fan recorded footage of the rapper appearing as a worker of the Post Office. 'Jehst Is My Postman' later turned out to be a PR stunt, as this recording was followed up by a music video of the single, featuring many other rappers dressed in a variety of costumes.

== Critical reception ==
The release received mostly positive reviews

== Track listing ==
Standard album
No.	Title	Producer(s)	Length
1.	"True Intentions"	LG	3:30
2.	"Killer Instinct"	Jehst	2:54
3.	"Zombies"	Zygote	4:09
4.	"Thinking Crazy"	Mr. Thing	5:02
5.	"England"	Beat Butcha	4:18
6.	"Camberwell Carrots"	LG	2:49
7.	"Starting Over"	Jehst	2:53
8.	"Old No. 7"	Chemo	3:42
9.	"The Illest" (additional vocals by Apollo)	Jehst	3:50
10.	"Sounds Like Money"	Jehst	3:20
11.	"Back to the Drawing Board"	Chemo	3:08
12.	"Poison"	LG	3:09
13.	"Interlude"	Jehst	1:07
14.	"Tears in Rain"	LG	3:42
15.	"Timeless"	Jon Phonics	3:37
16.	"Two Point One Four (The Dragon of an Ordinary Family)"	LG	4:49
Total length:			55:08
