= River Nelson =

American rapper

River Nelson is an American rapper, singer, songwriter, and producer, who began his recording career when he was signed to Arista Records by label helm Clive Davis. He collaborated with the Boogiemonsters to feature on the group’s classic debut Riders Of The Storm: The Under Water Album under the rap name Xtreem. River, who was born in New York City and spent his childhood in Norwalk, Connecticut, has since carved out a respectable following for himself around the world.

Nelson has toured with rappers Common and Talib Kweli, as well as singer Kelis. He's also been featured on BBC Radio 1Xtra. In addition, he's been played and supported by Gilles Peterson.

In September 2009, Nelson released his debut album "The Rise and Fall of River Nelson," produced by UK producer Lewis Parker. The album received rave reviews in different parts of the world, particularly in the United Kingdom. Andy Gill of The Independent wrote, "The Rise and Fall of River Nelson" shows River's "Thoughtful sentiments and positive attitude set to infectious symphonic-soul beats by British producer Lewis Parker."

River's 2013 album, "The Shape of The Sky," also produced by Parker, received stellar reviews as well, with Jamsphere Magazine writing, "It is one of those albums that fascinates you upon first listen and it keeps you hooked until the end."

Then in 2016, River released his third LP "How To Dream," which received immediate critical acclaim and national radio play in the UK. It was also named BBC Radio 6 Music's Album of the Day on Sept 5, 2016. Reviewing the album, The Word is Bond wrote, "Simply put, the 'How To Dream' album represents what hip-hop is, could be and once was, all in one fell swoop."

Nelson also released the EPs "While We're Young" and "Once We're Old" in 2011 with UK producer Bias. Both have received positive reviews, with The Find Mag writing, "Bias and River Nelson bring together their respective talents to create the boundary-pushing 5-track EP ‘While We’re Young.' Highlights include the hooky, defiant ‘Wherever We Go’, the perspective-inducing ‘Different At Night,’ and of course, the prowling title track, whose pitch-perfect blend of both US and UK hip hop, utilizing synths, samples, head nodding beats, and evocative lyrics."

On June 14, 2019, River released his fourth solo album "Power, Resilience & Joy," which Gigslutz said is "Lyrically rooted within brutal honesty" and a "True testament to the effective usage of story-telling." Meanwhile, Conversations About Her wrote that "Power, Resilience & Joy" "Is characterized by conscious and thought-provoking concepts, delivered with the grace of a veteran storyteller."

River released his fifth album, "Like the Sun Didn't Sink," on October 29, 2021, a project that's entirely produced by Los Angeles-area producer AltoBeats. The first single off the LP is "New View," which River says is about, "Someone seeing the world through a brand new lens.” The follow-up single on "Like the Sun Didn't Sink" is "Greatest of Lights," a song about God's protection," says River. "River Nelson drops deft lexicon over AltoBeats’ soulful celestial soundscape," wrote Insomniac Magazine about the single.
