= Birth of a Nation (1983 film) =

- Written by: David Leland
- Directed by: Mike Newell
- Starring: Jim Broadbent; Lisa Geoghan
- Country of origin: United Kingdom

Production
- Producers: Patrick Cassavetti; Margaret Matheson
- Editor: Steve Singleton
- Running time: 79 minutes

Original release
- Network: ITV
- Release: 19 June 1983

Birth of a Nation is a 1983 television play starring Jim Broadbent as teacher Geoff Figg. It was written by David Leland and directed by Mike Newell. It was originally broadcast on ITV on 19 June 1983 as the first in an untitled series of works by Leland (including Made in Britain), all loosely concerned with the British educational system, which subsequently acquired the overall title of Tales Out of School.

It was #31 in The Daily Telegraph's list of the Top 60 ITV shows. It was reviewed in newspapers such as The Times and the Reading Evening Post.
