= Made in Britain =

1983 British television play

- Written by: David Leland
- Directed by: Alan Clarke
- Starring: Tim Roth
- Music by: The Exploited
- Country of origin: United Kingdom
- Original language: English

Production
- Producers: Margaret Matheson; Patrick Cassavetti
- Cinematography: Chris Menges
- Editor: Steve Singleton
- Running time: 76 minutes
- Production company: Central Television

Original release
- Network: ITV
- Release: 10 July 1983

Made in Britain is a 1983 British television play written by David Leland and directed by Alan Clarke. It follows a 16-year-old skinhead and his constant confrontations with authority figures. It was broadcast on ITV on 10 July 1983 as the fourth in an untitled series of works by Leland (including Birth of a Nation), about different aspects of the British educational system, which subsequently acquired the overall title of Tales Out of School. It marked Tim Roth's television debut.

== Plot ==
Trevor has been charged for throwing a brick at the window of a Pakistani man, Mr. Shahnawaz. Trevor's social worker, Harry Parker, takes him to Hooper Street Residential Assessment Centre, where his punishment will be determined. The centre's polite, benevolent deputy superintendent, Peter Clive, admits Trevor, and he is allocated a room with a 19-year-old black adolescent Errol, whom Trevor takes an instant disliking to though is still somewhat civil towards.

The next day, Trevor leaves the assessment centre to look for jobs. He meets Errol and they break into a car and drive to the job centre. Trevor buys a tin of glue from a local hardware store and empties the contents into a polythene bag. He and Errol inhale the fumes, then leaving Errol in the car, Trevor walks to the job centre. On entering, he converses with another young job seeker who asks Trevor to read several of the job cards for him as he is illiterate. Trevor takes a number of job cards from the display boards and barges past the queue, demanding a job from the attendant. When told that he must wait his turn and asked to return the cards back to the boards, he storms out before hurling a concrete slab through the window. He and Errol break into another car. Trevor tells Errol to leave the car and return to the assessment centre, before taking it and driving away.

Arriving back at the centre in the stolen car, he is spotted by Peter Clive. At first, Trevor denies stealing the car, but after realising that Peter has seen him sitting in it, opts to dump it. Returning back to the centre Trevor demands lunch, only to be informed that he is too late. Trevor viciously attacks the chef before being stopped by care worker Barry Giller. Trevor is then restrained by the chef and Barry, who along with Peter and another member of staff, lock him in a room.

A superintendent arrives and tells Trevor that he is heading to prison. He explains that the assessment centre is Trevor's last chance to change the cycle of poverty, crime and prison. Uncharacteristically, Trevor is not aggressive and is lost for words. As soon as the superintendent leaves, Trevor is back to his usual self. He rants about his views on race, authority, and the British educational and correctional systems. Eventually, Barry and Peter decide to send him to a secure children's home. However, while Barry is out making arrangements to send Trevor away, Peter offers to take Trevor banger racing if he promises to behave. Trevor accepts on the condition that he can drive.

They go to the races. Trevor seems to enjoy the experience but gets into an accident, after which his car will not restart, so he cannot complete the race. On the drive back to the assessment centre, Peter informs Trevor that he could join a racing team if he wishes and so would not need to steal cars any longer. Trevor remains silent.

After everybody has retired to bed, Trevor wakes up Errol and shows him Peter's keys, which he has taken. Trevor and Errol make their way into the office, and Trevor finds their respective files. He then reads out Errol's report which says that Errol will likely never return home. He drops the files on the floor and tells Errol to urinate and defecate on them. Errol defecates on his files, and Trevor urinates on his.

Trevor and Errol leave and steal the center's Ford Transit minibus. After reaching Mr. Shahnawaz's neighborhood they find his house, hurl stones through his windows and scream racial insults, then get back into the minibus and drive away. Trevor drives to a police station and smashes the minibus into a car. Errol is rendered unconscious by the impact. Trevor runs away, framing Errol by leaving him with Peter Clive’s keys, Errol was later apprehended by the police.

Trevor spends the rest of the early morning making his way back to Harry Parker's home. Harry tells him to go back to the assessment center before it is too late. Trevor informs Harry of his misadventures and tells him that he is turning himself in. Giving up on him as a lost cause, Harry makes the necessary calls to the police.

After being taken to the local police station, Trevor is locked in a cell where he keeps his finger on the wall buzzer to alert the duty officer. The officer orders him to keep his hands off the buzzer, so Trevor proceeds to press the buzzer with his head. The officer returns but this time is accompanied by another officer, PC Anson, who enters with a truncheon. Trevor continues to provoke Anson who tells him that he will be taken to court on Monday morning, and this time, he will end up in a detention centre or a borstal, not an assessment centre. Anson tells Trevor that on release from the detention centre, the police will be waiting for him, that they will bring him back to the station, and will pin on him every unsolved car theft in the area stretching back over many months. The result would be that Trevor would enter the prison system and would likely remain incarcerated for a very long time. Seemingly undeterred Trevor replies with 'Sounds great!'. Anson then brings the truncheon down, hitting Trevor on the kneecap. Anson smiles and says, 'You think you're 'ard, don't you?’ Trevor finally looks defeated. Anson tells Trevor that he is all talk and has no choice but to respect authority and obey the rules like everybody else.

Trevor recovers from the pain and grins as the warders shut the door of the cell.

== Cast ==
- Tim Roth as Trevor
- Bill Stewart as Peter Clive
- Geoffrey Hutchings as the Superintendent
- Terry Richards as Errol Dupraey
- Eric Richard as Harry Parker
- Sean Chapman as Barry Giller
- Christopher Fulford as P.C. Anson

== Production ==
After successful collaborations on previous projects like Beloved Enemy and Psy-Warriors, writer David Leland and director Alan Clarke were keen to work with each other again. Producer Margaret Matheson, who had worked with both Leland and Clarke before (including on the original version of Scum) was taking over as Head of Drama at the then-newly created Central Television. Matheson was keen to develop a project about education, and a series of four one-off plays eventually broadcast under the umbrella title Tales Out of School was commissioned.

David Leland, when interviewed in 1998, recalled that Clarke was initially reluctant to commit to the directing duties of Made in Britain – "He was trying then to do Contact; his mind was elsewhere [...] it was only because we were friends, we could meet and talk about Made in Britain."

Made in Britain is notable as one of the first British television dramas (and Clarke's first production) to make use of the steadicam. Fellow director Stephen Frears, who at that point was in the process of editing his film Walter, said that his cameraman on that project – Chris Menges – was a "huge influence" on Clarke using the steadicam. Recalling the filming process in a 1998 interview, he said that "Made in Britain was written very powerfully, and it had these rather long sequences which posed certain technical problems [...] he [Clarke] found a piece of equipment that liberated him from that." Clarke became so enamored with the technical properties of the steadicam that it would be used repeatedly during the rest of his filmed work throughout the 1980s, including on the BBC dramas Christine (1986), Road (1987), Elephant and The Firm (both 1989). Former BBC director of plays Chris Morahan said that "Steadicam was the trigger for his creativity."

Despite being a production relatively free of complications, problems arose with the filming of the original ending. As scripted, the final shot of the production was to feature Trevor, now confined to a borstal, digging trenches in the backyard with all the other inmates and encouraging them to 'dig for Britain'. As David Leland noted in a 2016 interview accompanying the re-release of the play for Tales Out of School DVD collection, "I'm a country boy...I assumed everyone knew what trenching was." Director Clarke misunderstood the directions in the script, resulting in a scene where the borstal inmates are digging seemingly randomly placed holes. Deemed unsatisfactory and with insufficient funds to re-film it, the televised film closes on a freeze-frame of Trevor's grinning face in police custody. Screenshots and script directions from the original ending are enclosed on the aforementioned DVD.

== Impact ==
The Tales Out of School series was selected by the Television Literacy Project at Cambridge University and the IBA as the first television series to be utilised as part of the examined English Literature curriculum. Each film in the series was published as a book edited by the projects lead Paul Kelley, containing a new introduction, production details and the full original shooting script, with notes where these differed from the filmed/broadcast version. The books, along with VHS copies of the unedited broadcast were made available to schools for classroom study. Flying into the Wind was the first completed book to be included on O Level exam papers in 1985, with Made in Britain (deemed too provocative for O'level), being included in A' level syllabuses from 1986. The scriptbook for Made in Britain contained a new four part introduction by David Leland.

== Music ==
The music in the opening scene is the song "UK82" by Scottish punk rock band The Exploited. The lyrics are included in full in the Television Literacy Project's book of the film's script.

The album Council Estate of Mind by Skinnyman extensively samples the dialogue of the film.
