= High Focus Records =

- Founded: 2010
- Founder: Fliptrix
- Genre: Hip-hop, old school hip hop, boom bap revival
- Country of origin: United Kingdom
- Location: Brighton
- Official website: www.high-focus.com/home/

High Focus Records is an independent British hip-hop record label founded by rapper Fliptrix in 2010, following the collapse of Low Life Records.

== History ==
In 2008, Fliptrix was in the process of releasing his first album on Low Life Records the largest UK hip-hop label at the time. Unfortunately, the label collapsed later that year. As a result, Fliptrix turned to one of the only other hip-hop labels in the UK at that time, YNR. However the label's owner, Jehst, recommended he create his own label in order to get his album out as soon as possible. Friends of Fliptrix, such as Jam Baxter and Leaf Dog, asked if he could put their albums out too - and it was from there High Focus Records began to grow.

== Details ==
Originally influenced by late 1990s and early 2000s British hip hop artists such as Jehst, Task Force and Skinnyman, High Focus has often focused on a 1990s US 'boom bap' style hip hop sound. However, it has diversified its artist roster into alternative hip hop in recent years with Onoe Caponoe Strange U and Jam Baxter incorporating wider influences.

The label has released dozens of albums and projects since 2010. They have released one UK top 40 album, Ocean Wisdom's Wizville in 2018. However, he has since left the label to start his own venture with Warner Music. As of October 2015, High Focus Records has had nearly 40 million views on its YouTube channel.

In 2016, High Focus regular Verb T teamed up with comedian Doc Brown to release a song dedicated to their shared local South London football team Crystal Palace FC. The track, called "Glad All Over Again", was played at Wembley in the 2016 FA Cup Final between Crystal Palace and Manchester United.

Verb T and producer Pitch 92 (who have two albums out together on High Focus) also recorded the theme tune for the Sky One television series The Reluctant Landlord. Show creator and comedian Romesh Ranganathan has featured High Focus members The Four Owls, Dirty Dike and former label star Ocean Wisdom on his hip hop themed podcast, Hip Hop Saved My Life.

High Focus artists have also been frequent collaborators with Rag'n'Bone Man, who released two EPs on the label between 2011 and 2014.

== Artists ==
=== Current and former acts ===
- Brothers of the Stone
- BVA
- CMPND
- Contact Play
- Coops
- Cracker Jon & 2Late
- Dabbla
- Datkid
- Dead Players
- Dirty Dike
- DJ Sammy B-Side
- Ed Scissor
- Fliptrix
- The Four Owls
- Jam Baxter
- Leaf Dog
- Mr Key
- Mr Slipz
- Onoe Caponoe
- Ocean Wisdom
- Rag'n'Bone Man
- Ramson Badbonez
- Ronnie Bosh
- Strange U
- TrueMendous
- Verb T
- Verbz
- Vitamin G

=== Associated producers ===
- Chemo
- Leaf Dog
- Illinformed
- DJ Sammy B-Side
- Talos
- Pitch 92
- Dirty Dike
- Pete Cannon
- Joe Corfield
- Molotov
- DJ Madnice
- Ghosttown
- Runone
- Alecs DeLarge
