= Nah Eeto =

Kenyan rapper

Nah Eeeto
- Born: Victoria "Vikki" Digby-Johns; Kenya
- Genres: Alternative hip-hop, Afrobeat, Trap
- Years active: 2017 – Present
- Label: Blah Records

Nah Eeto is a Kenyan rapper and videographer, currently releasing music on UK-based label Blah Records. She has collaborated with many English and African artists, and raps both in the Swahili and English language. She has worked with respected Afrobeat and jazz drummer Tony Allen and Blah founder Lee Scott, among others.

== Style and works ==
Nah Eeto was born in Kenya, and has since lived in Tanzania, Thailand and the UK. In 2017, while working as videographer for hip-hop label Blah, she encouraged founder Lee Scott to help her learn to rap. The result was Nah Eeto's first single on Blah, 2020's Wanawake. Since then, she has released eight singles on Blah and has rapped for various other artists around the world. In 2021, she featured on Nigerian drummer Tony Allen's posthumous album There Is No End. Reviewers highlighted her feature track, Mau Mau, and called it "one of the album's best grooves", praising her "devastating, satirical flow". In 2021, she also featured on Kenyan DJ, DJ Iche's mixtape of Kenyan rappers Nai Yetu. She has also been placed in rotation on major online radio station NTS Radio on several occasions.

Nah Eeto raps in several languages, over multiple genres of hip-hop. She delivers lyrics in English, Swahili and bits of a Kenyan dialect called Sheng – occasionally all at once in one track. "That's also quite important for me to represent the fact that I am mixed race and that I've lived in lots of different places. Instead of trying to put on an accent or trying to be one more than the other, I'm trying to really just rep that whole mixing," she told an interviewer in 2021.
