= Roaring 20s (album) =

Studio album by Rizzle Kicks
- Released: 2 September 2013
- Recorded: June 2012 – February 2013
- Genre: Hip hop
- Length: 45:16
- Label: Universal Island
- Producer: Ant Whiting; Pete Cannon; Norman Cook

Rizzle Kicks chronology
| Stereo Typical (2011) | Roaring 20s (2013) | Competition Is for Losers (2025) |

Singles from Roaring 20s
- 1. "Lost Generation" Released: 25 August 2013; 2. "Skip to the Good Bit" Released: 25 October 2013; 3. "Happy That You're Here" Released: 15 December 2013

Roaring 20s is the second studio album by British duo, Rizzle Kicks. The album was released in the United Kingdom on 2 September 2013. The album was preceded by the release of the official lead single, "Lost Generation", as well as the promotional track "That's Classic".

The album saw the duo team up with long-term collaborators Ant Whiting and Norman Cook, aka Fatboy Slim, who both appeared as producers on the duo's first album Stereo Typical, as well as songwriter Jamie Cullum co-writing two tracks on the album, and lending guest vocals to one. Pete Cannon produced the album's opening 2 tracks. An exclusive super-deluxe edition, featuring a signed poster, AAA lanyard and Rizzle Kicks pendant, is available exclusively from the Rizzle Kicks online store. This version also includes an exclusive deluxe physical copy of the album. The first single from the album, "Lost Generation", debuted at number six on the UK Singles Chart.

The duo revealed on 9 July 2013 that they were forced to call in libel lawyers to take a look through the lyrics of "Lost Generation", as they feared legal action after name-checking both Chelsea FC footballer John Terry and television personality Jeremy Kyle in the song.

== Singles ==
- "That's Classic" was released as a taster track from the album on 1 June 2013, with an accompanying music video. The track pays reference to wizards, witches and Harry Potter, referencing lead actor Daniel Radcliffe. The video was filmed in black and white, and features the duo dressing up as wizards and sitting in a study, performing the track.
- "Lost Generation" was released as the lead single from the album on 25 August 2013. The duo ran a competition for fans to come along and help create the music video, with budding make-up artists, directors, wardrobe designers and other various roles open for fulfilment by students, graduates and other young personnel. The track received its first radio airplay on Wednesday 10 July on BBC Radio 1 Xtra.
- "Skip to the Good Bit" was released as the album's second single on 25 October 2013. It was used in a trailer for Strictly Come Dancing series 11. The song also uses the rhythm and sound of "Unbelievable" by "EMF". The music video features British actor Will Poulter.
- "Happy That You're Here" was released as the album's third single on 15 December 2013. The track appears on the re-release of the album which was made available on 7 December 2013. The duo's first Christmas song, the track received an official video which also premiered on 15 December. The track did not chart on the UK Singles Chart.

== Track listing ==
All tracks are written by Jordan Stephens, Harley Alexander-Sule, Ant Whiting and Emily Phillips and produced by Whiting, except where noted.

| No. | Title | Writer(s) | Producer(s) | Length |
|---|---|---|---|---|
| 1. | "This Means War" (featuring Dabbla) | Jordan Stephens; Harley Alexander-Sule; Pete Cannon | Cannon | 3:45 |
| 2. | "Lost Generation" | Stephens; Alexander-Sule; Ant Whiting; Emily Phillips; Cannon | Whiting; Cannon | 3:37 |
| 3. | "The Reason I Live" (featuring Jamie Cullum) | Stephens; Alexander-Sule; Whiting; Jamie Cullum; Lester Salmins | | 4:34 |
| 4. | "Skip to the Good Bit" | | | 3:54 |
| 5. | "Jive" | | | 3:48 |
| 6. | "Don't Bring Me Down" | | | 3:28 |
| 7. | "Lunatic" | | | 3:39 |
| 8. | "Everything Will be Better in the Morning" (Interlude) | | | 1:03 |
| 9. | "Me Around You" (featuring Bang Bang Bang) | | | 4:14 |
| 10. | "Wind Up" (featuring Herman Stephens) | | | 3:42 |
| 11. | "Jam Yourself" | | | 3:49 |
| 12. | "Put Your Twos Up" (featuring Dominic West) | Stephens; Alexander-Sule; Whiting; Norman Cook | Whiting; Cook | 3:24 |
| 13. | "I Love You More Than You Think" | Stephens; Alexander-Sule; Whiting; Phillips; Cullum | | 3:57 |
| 14. | "That's Classic" | | | 3:42 |

Special edition bonus track (released 7 December 2013)
| No. | Title | Length |
|---|---|---|
| 15. | "Happy That You're Here" | 3:22 |

Deluxe edition bonus tracks
| No. | Title | Writer(s) | Length |
|---|---|---|---|
| 15. | "Biscuits" | Stephens; Alexander-Sule; Whiting | 3:45 |
| 16. | "Fine With Me" | Stephens; Alexander-Sule; Whiting | 4:36 |
| 17. | "Keep It Up" | | 3:25 |

Spotify bonus tracks
| No. | Title | Writer(s) | Producer(s) | Length |
|---|---|---|---|---|
| 15. | "For Lovers" | Jake Fior; Peter Randall; Pete Doherty | Rizzle Kicks | 3:07 |
| 16. | "Georgia on My Mind" | Hoagy Carmichael; Stuart Gorrell | Rizzle Kicks | 3:14 |
| 17. | "Earl Grey" | Stephens; Alexander-Sule; Whiting | | 5:04 |

== Release history ==
| Region | Date | Format | Label |
|---|---|---|---|
| Ireland | 31 August 2013 | Standard, deluxe | Universal Island |
| United Kingdom | 2 September 2013 | Standard, deluxe, super deluxe | Universal Island |
