= Lost Generation (song) =

2013 single by Rizzle Kicks

Single by Rizzle Kicks

from the album Roaring 20s
- Released: 25 August 2013
- Recorded: 2013
- Genre: British hip hop; jazz rap
- Length: 3:37
- Label: Universal Island
- Songwriter(s): Jordan Stephens, Harley Alexander-Sule, Ant Whiting, Emily Phillips, Pete Cannon
- Producer(s): Ant Whiting, Pete Cannon

Rizzle Kicks singles chronology
"Dreamers" (2012)	"Lost Generation" (2013)	"Skip to the Good Bit" (2013)

"Lost Generation" is a song by English hip hop duo Rizzle Kicks. The song was released as a digital download in the United Kingdom on 25 August 2013 as the lead single from their second studio album, Roaring 20s (2013). The song was written by Jordan Stephens, Harley Alexander-Sule, Ant Whiting, Emily Phillips and Pete Cannon. The song peaked at #6 on the UK Singles Chart.

== Critical reception ==
Robert Copsey of Digital Spy gave the song a positive review, stating:

"Rizzle Kicks have painted a rather bleak picture of today's yoof on their latest track. On paper it sounds like career suicide, but as always they pull it off with their razor-sharp lyrics and take-it-or-leave-it attitude [...] "Why is everybody so PC?/ It's not my fault if you take offence," they conclude - and if we're honest, we couldn't agree more.".

== Music video ==
A music video to accompany the release of "Lost Generation" was first released onto YouTube on 24 July 2013 at a total length of four minutes and eighteen seconds. The music video was directed by Jamie Thraves and was produced with the help of 150 young people between the ages of 16 and 24, as part of the GoThinkBig initiative. The video shows Rizzle Kicks returning home from a heavy night out, before their morning starts referencing several TV shows, including Big Brother, Britain's Got Talent and The Jeremy Kyle Show.

== Track listing ==
Promotional CD single
No.	Title	Length
1.	"Lost Generation" (clean radio edit)	3:37
2.	"Lost Generation" (explicit album version)	3:37

Digital download
No.	Title	Length
1.	"Lost Generation"	3:37

Digital download - remix
No.	Title	Length
1.	"Lost Generation" (Max Sanna & Steve Pitron club mix)	5:40

== Charts ==
=== Weekly charts ===
Chart (2013)	Peak position
Ireland (IRMA)	61
Scotland (OCC)	7
UK Singles (OCC)	6

=== Year-end charts ===
Chart (2013)	Position
UK Singles (Official Charts Company)	141

== Certifications ==
Region	Certification	Certified units/sales
United Kingdom (BPI)	Silver	200,000^{‡}
^{‡} Sales+streaming figures based on certification alone.

== Release history ==
Region	Date	Format	Label
United Kingdom	25 August 2013	digital download	Universal Island
