= Dubbledge =

Dubbledge is an English rapper based in Watford.

He first gained interest with the track The Internet Song, which was distributed online.

He has appeared on releases by UK hip hop artists including Foreign Beggars, Micall Parknsun, Braintax, and Jehst

Dubbledge released the mixtape The Fist of Jah in 2005. It featured the likes of Foreign Beggers and Genesis Elijah with production by Dag Nabit and beatboxing by Shlomo.

Dubbledge's debut album The Richest Man in Babylon was released on Low Life Records on 1 October 2007. HHC's Hugh Leask noted Dubbledge's "skill for setting the ordinary next to the extraordinary, blending the humdrum everyday minutia with the dramatic and explosive".

His Dubbledge vs The Boondocks album released in 2011 saw the rapper use fragments of the cartoon series The Boondocks to create a unique 35 minute concept album featuring production from Chase & Status, Ben Grymm, DJ IQ, L.G and Metabeats.

On the subject of how he came up with his name, he once said in an interview "A Rasta man once told me that the tongue is a double-edged sword, even though it may be one of the smallest muscles in your body. It can do the most damage. It can start wars or bring peace."
