= Council Estate of Mind =

Studio album by Skinnyman
- Released: 9 August 2004
- Studio: DJ Flip's House (London, England)
- Genre: British hip hop
- Length: 55:52
- Label: Low Life
- Producer: Adam M; Baby J; DJ Flip; DJ Noize; Stoned Soldiers

Professional ratings
Review scores
Source	Rating
BBC Collective	4/5 stars
Cokemachineglow	72/100
Urban Smarts	75/100
Stylus Magazine	B

Council Estate of Mind is the debut studio album by English rapper Skinnyman, released on 9 August 2004 by Low Life Records. It was produced by DJ Flip, Stoned Soldiers, Adam M, and others. The album makes use of samples from Made in Britain, a British film from the early 1980s. The album spent two weeks on the UK Albums Chart, peaking at number 65.

== Release and legacy ==
Skinnyman self-recorded the album, taking it to Low Life Records for a formal release. Label owner Joseph Christie, also known as Braintax, shut down the label a few years after the release of Council Estate of Mind, disappearing without compensating Skinnyman with album royalties.

Council Estate of Mind is regarded as a British hip hop classic, noted as an "illustrative depiction of life in Britain for young, working-class people."

== Track listing ==
No.	Title	Length
1.	"Intro"	1:06
2.	"Fuck the Hook"	4:54
3.	"Hayden"	4:05
4.	"Little Man (Part 1)"	2:30
5.	"Little Man (Part 2)"	1:18
6.	"Love's Gone from the Streets"	4:35
7.	"Day to Day Basis"	4:10
8.	"Life in My Rhymes"	4:30
9.	"It's Over"	4:32
10.	"I'll Be Surprised"	4:11
11.	"Who? Me"	2:54
12.	"No Big Ting"	4:13
13.	"Put in the Work"	3:52
14.	"That's What I'm Gonna Do"	4:20
15.	"Council Estate of Mind"	4:42
Total length:		55:52

== Charts ==
Chart performance for Council Estate of Mind
Chart (2004)	Peak position
UK Albums (OCC)	65
UK Independent Albums (OCC)	6
UK R&B Albums (OCC)	15
