= Back to the Sagas =

Studio album by Klashnekoff
- Released: July 26, 2010
- Recorded: 2009–2010; Various recording locations
- Genre: Hip hop
- Length: 55:48
- Label: Abstract Urban
- Producer: Smasher, DJ Insite, Joe Buddha, Sleeping Giants

Klashnekoff chronology
Lionheart: Tussle with the Beast (2007)	Back to the Sagas (2010)	Iona (2019)

Professional ratings
Review scores
Source	Rating
Metro	link
BBC	unfavourable link
The Guardian	link
The Independent	link
rapreviews	(7.5/10) link

Back to the Sagas is the third studio album by London rapper Klashnekoff, released July 26, 2010, on Abstract Urban. Production for the album took place during 2009 to 2010 at several recording studios and was handled by Smasher, DJ Insite, Joe Buddha and Sleeping Giants.

== Track listing ==
No.	Title	Producer(s)	Length
1.	"Church Intro"	DJ Insite	4:14
2.	"Back to the Sagas"	Smasher	2:44
3.	"Keep It Moving" (feat. D.Ablo)	Smasher	3:56
4.	"Soon Come"	Smasher	3:14
5.	"Tek Time" (feat. Capito and Skriblah)	Joe Buhdha	4:31
6.	"Music Game"	Sleeping Giants	4:12
7.	"Somebody Tell Me" (feat. Smasher and Wretch 32)	Joe Buhdha	4:37
8.	"Klash Anthem"	Smasher	3:35
9.	"Forever More" (feat. D.Ablo)	Smasher	3:52
10.	"Paper Up"	Sleeping Giants	4:13
11.	"Shine On"	Smasher	2:44
12.	"Get It Too"	Sleeping Giants	3:44
13.	"Cold World"	Sleeping Giants	2:50
14.	"Repping Hard" (feat. Capito)	Smasher	3:09
15.	"Raw" (feat. Skriblah)	Sleeping Giants	4:16

• (co) - co-producer
• (add) - additional producer
