= The Travel Show =

EP by Braintax
- Released: 1 January 1999
- Recorded: 1998
- Genre: British hip hop
- Length: 14:19 (digital album); 21:13 (12" vinyl)
- Label: Low Life
- Producer: Braintax; Ben Grymm (on "Go There")

Braintax chronology
Future Years (1997)	The Travel Show (1999)	Hard Working / Escúchame (2000)

The Travel Show is an EP by British rapper Braintax, was released through Low Life Records in 1999. The EP was never released on CD; however, it can be purchased on the Internet as a digital download in MP3 format.

== Track listing ==
=== Digital album ===
1. "Tools" — 3:21
2. "Rational Geographics" — 3:29
3. "Go There" — 3:33
4. "Making Moves" — 3:56

=== 12" vinyl ===
A Side:

1. "Tools" — 3:21
2. "Rational Geographics" — 3:29
3. "Tools" (Instrumental) — 3:21

B Side:

1. "Go There" — 3:33
2. "Making Moves" — 3:56
3. "Go There" (Instrumental) — 3:33

== Personale ==
Braintax produced all songs on this EP, expect "Go There," which Ben Grymm produced. Scratches on "Go There" are by Giacomo and scratches on "Making Moves" are by Lewis Parker; "Making Moves" also features Lewis Parker and Supa T. The Travel Show was the first album recorded after DJ T.E.S.T. left the Braintax duo. Joseph Christie thus became the sole member of Braintax and started using Braintax as his recording name.
