= Task Force (hip-hop group) =

British hip hop group

Taskforce
- Origin: Highbury, London, England
- Genres: Hip hop
- Years active: 1998–present
- Labels: Low Life, Music from the Corner
- Members: Chester P Farma G

Task Force are a British hip hop group from Highbury in London, England. The group is led primarily by two brothers Chester P (vocals, songwriting and occasional music production) and Farma G (vocals, songwriting and music production). However, the Task Force family, according to Chester P, also includes DJ Louis Slipperz (music production), Ramson BadBones (vocals and songwriting), Remus, D.Molish, Inja MC (Delegates of Culture, Cambridge), Calculus, Merkamillion, Blinks and Marley. Task Force officially formed in 1999, releasing their debut album New Mic Order.

Task Force's debut album, New Mic Order was produced by Mark B and features guest appearances from fellow Mud Family member Skinnyman and Mr. Thing of the Scratch Perverts. Task Force's releases have consisted for the most part of vinyl-only EPs and singles. In 2000, Task Force released Voice of the Great Outdoors, which featured Braintax and Jehst, on Braintax's Low Life Records. Task Force started their own label, Music from the Corner in 2001, and released Music from the Corner Volume 1. A darker, more intense series of predominantly self-produced albums followed. Chester P released his long-awaited solo album From the Ashes in 2008, which was largely a hit with the Task Force fan base, despite receiving a mixed review (3 out of 5) from UK hip-hop magazine Hip-Hop Connection (as Chester had previously ripped the magazine on MFTC 2). Both Farma G and Louis Slipperz contributed to the album. The first single released from the album was "Oh No (He Loves a Ho)" featuring Farma G. The song was more light hearted than the recent Music from the Corner series.

== Discography ==
=== Albums ===
- New Mic Order LP (1999, K'Boro)
- Music from the Corner Volume 1 (2001, Music from the Corner)
- Music from the Corner Volume 2 (2003, Music from the Corner)
- Music from the Corner Volume 3 (2004, Music from the Corner)
- Music from the Corner Volume 4 (2006, Music from the Corner)
- Music from the Corner Volume 5 (2013, Music from the Corner)

=== Singles and EPs ===
- "Grafdabusup" 12" (2000, Low Life)
- "Wha Blow" 12" (2000, Low Life)
- Voice of the Great Outdoors EP (2000, Low Life)
- "Life Without Instructions" 12" (2001 rehab records)
- The Chosen Few EP (with Phi-Life Cypher) (2002, Jazz Fudge)
- "Fugs R Us" 12" (2002, Low Life)
- "12" Apostles" 12" (with Pegasus) (2003, Obese)
- "Valley of the Crows" 12" (with Secondson) (2004, SFDB)
- "You're Not Us" 12" (with Rawdog) (2005, Music from the Corner)
- "The Bitches" 12" (2006, white label)

=== Solo albums ===
- Chester P - From the Ashes (2007, LP, Chessmonster Entertainment/Rawdog)
- Chester P - Survive or Die Trying (New Mic Order Part 1) (2008, mixtape)
- Farma G - It's a Funny Old Game (2009, mixtape)
- Chester P - New Mic Order Part 2 (2011, mixtape, Chessmonster Entertainment/Suspect Packages)
- Farma G - How To Kill A Butterfly (2025 High Focus)

=== Compilation appearances ===
- S Class Bruk Faders Mix Tape (1999)
- Headcleaners Mix Tape Micro Clones (1999)
- Headcleaners 2 Mix Tape (2001)
- "Liquidized Language" (from Deeper Concentration) (1999)
- DJ Louis Slipperz - £10 Bag Volume 1 (2002, mixtape, Music from the Corner)
- DJ Louis Slipperz - £10 Bag Volume 2 (2003, mixtape, Music from the Corner)
- DJ Louis Slipperz - £10 Bag Volume 3 (2004, Mixtape, Music from the Corner)
- Lowlife's Life Before 40 (2005)
- Lowlife's Lowlife's Main Courses (2003)
- Skitz - Countryman (2001, Ronin)
- Pegz - Capricorn Cat (Australia) (2003, Obese Records)

=== Guest appearances ===
- Mark B & Blade - "The Unknown" (2000, Wordplay)
- Jehst - "The Trilogy" (Remix) - Limited Edition 12" (2001)
- Rawdog - "Arrest the President" (with Braintax) (2003, Obese)
- Louis Slipperz and Rawdog - "JD on Ice" (2006, Rawdog)
- Inja - "Dem Frauds" (2006, Inja Nu)
- The Elementz - "Crushmode" (2008, Occupy Your Mind Recordings)
- Braintax - Godnose (2001, Low Life Records)
- Dj Vadim - "Something To Feel" & Mr Thing (2002 Dork Records)
