= Emily Phillips =

American politician

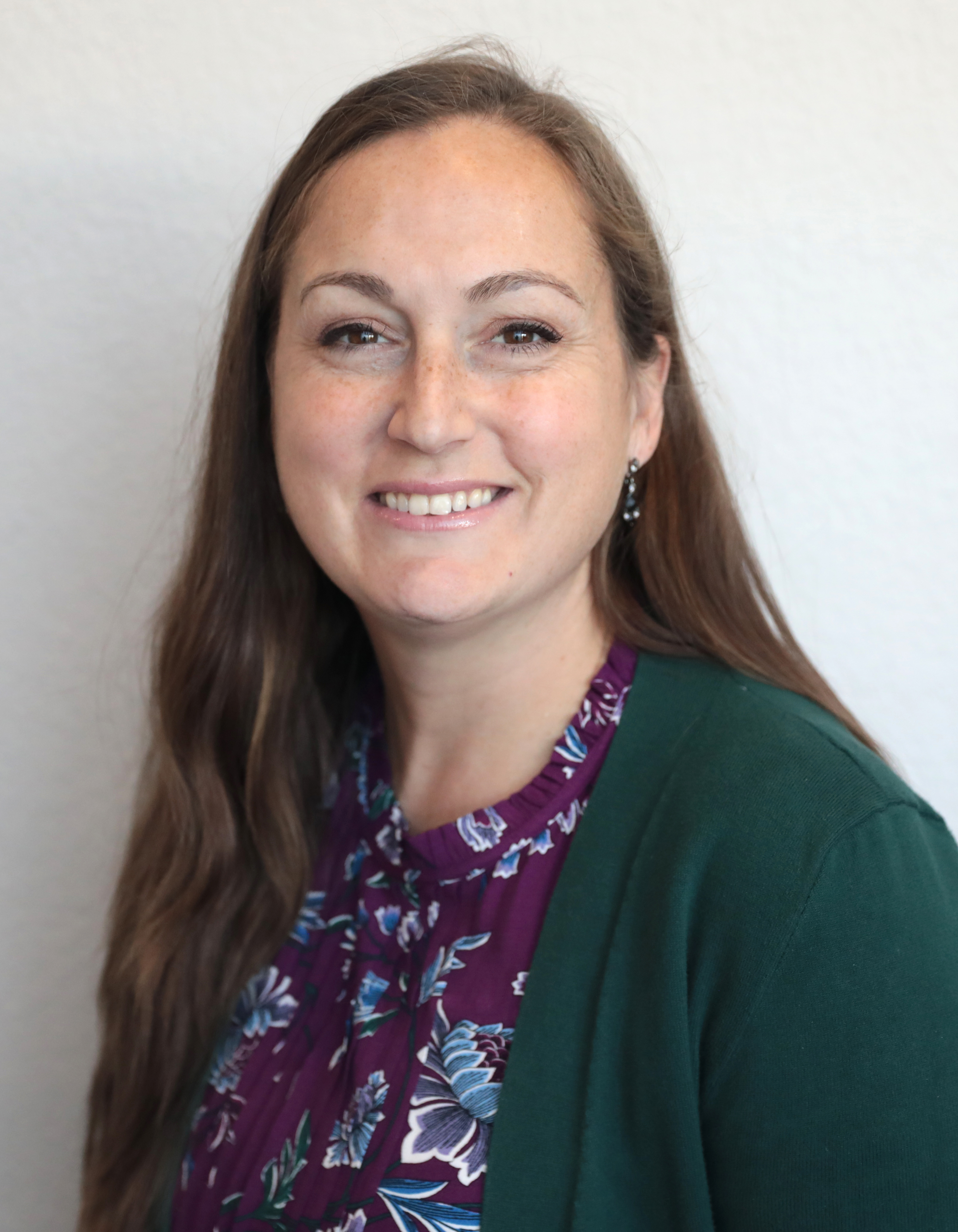
- Phillips in 2022

Member of the New Hampshire House of Representatives from the Rockingham 7th district
- In office December 7, 2022 – December 4, 2024

Personal details
- Party: Republican

Emily Phillips is a New Hampshire libertarian political activist and former politician. She served one term as a Republican member of the New Hampshire House of Representatives for the Rockingham 7th district from 2022 until 2024.

In 2024, she received the Legislator of the Year award from the New Hampshire Liberty Alliance. That same year, she announced her candidacy against State Senate District 23 incumbent Senator Bill Gannon. She was endorsed by Americans for Prosperity, an organization which spent heavily boosting her candidacy.

In August 2024, Phillips was removed from her role in New Hampshire House Republican Leadership after publicly endorsing and soliciting political contributions for New Hampshire House Progressive Caucus Founder and Democratic State Representative Ellen Read.

Phillips ultimately lost the primary to Gannon by a significant margin of 67% to 33%, having been defeated in every precinct in the district including her hometown of Fremont.

Her policy priorities include banning circumcision, legalization of recreational drug use, promoting universal school vouchers, safeguarding Second Amendment rights, and establishing a parental bill of rights.
