= The Four Owls =

British hip hop group

- Origin: United Kingdom
- Genres: British hip hop
- Years active: 2011–present
- Labels: High Focus
- Members: Fliptrix; Verb T; BVA; Leaf Dog

The Four Owls, or simply The Owls, are a British hip hop group formed in 2011.

The group is signed to English label High Focus Records and is composed entirely of previously established High Focus members under bird-themed aliases: Fliptrix (Big Owl), Verb T (Bird T), BVA (Rusty Take-Off), and Leaf Dog (Deformed Wing).

The Owls released their third album, Nocturnal Instinct, on 17 April 2020. The album featured US legends DJ Premier, R.A. the Rugged Man and Kool G Rap, among others.

== Discography ==
=== Albums ===
Title	Details
Nature's Greatest Mystery	Released: 5 December 2011; Label: High Focus Records; Formats: CD, digital download, vinyl; Producer: Leaf Dog
Natural Order	Released: 12 February 2015; Label: High Focus Records; Formats: CD, digital download, vinyl; Producer: Leaf Dog, DJ Premier
Nocturnal Instinct	Released: 17 April 2020; Label: High Focus Records; Formats: CD, digital download, Vinyl; Producer: Leaf Dog, DJ Premier

=== Singles ===
- Think Twice (Prod. DJ Premier)
