= The Purist =

British hip hop record producer and DJ

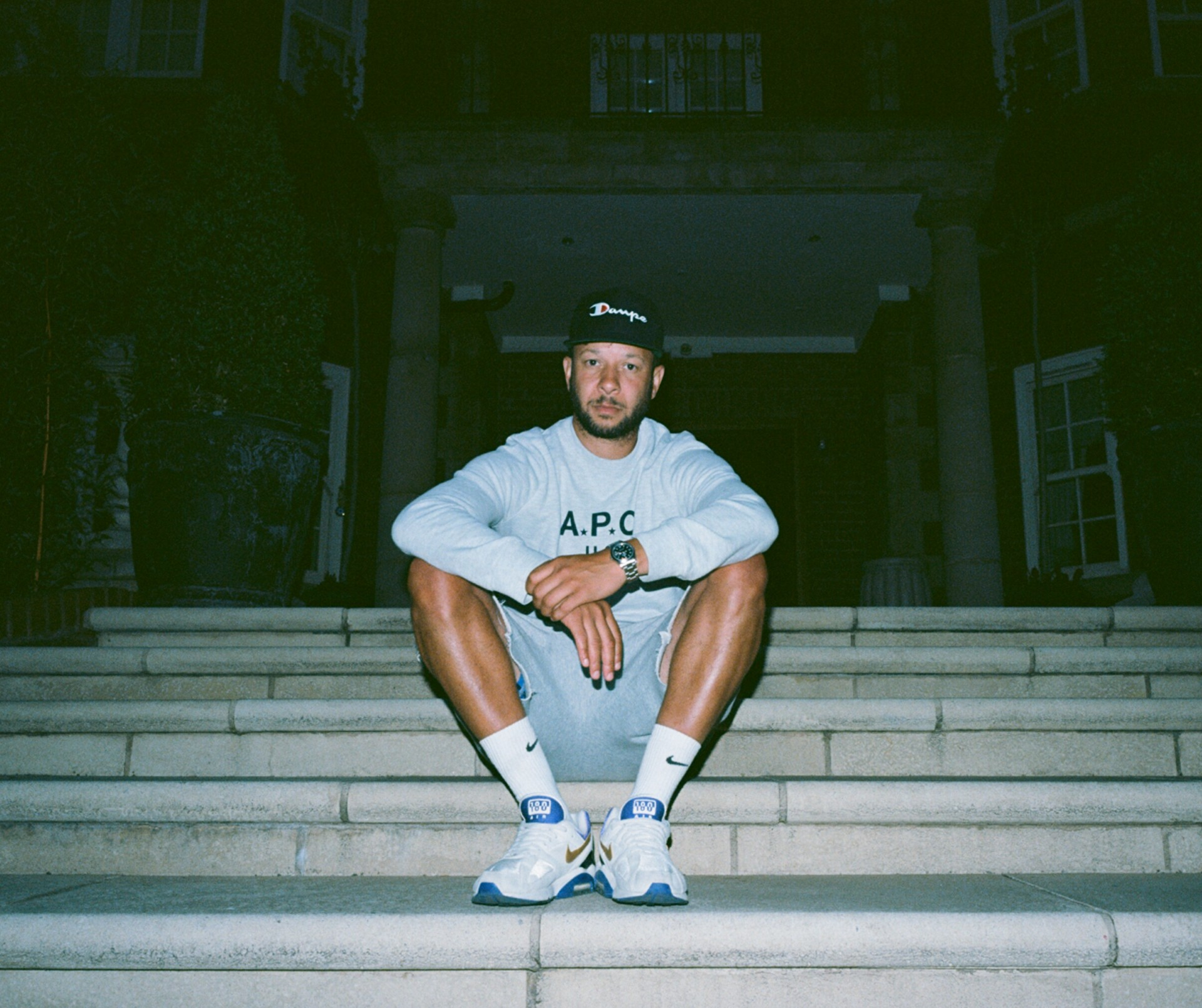

Background information
- Born: Lawrence Lord; Chichester, West Sussex, UK
- Genre: Hip hop
- Occupations: Producer, Songwriter
- Years active: 2010 - present
- Label: Daupe!

Lawrence Lord, professionally known as The Purist, is a British hip hop record producer and DJ from Chichester, West Sussex. He has collaborated with various prominent American and British rappers including MF Doom, Westside Gunn, Danny Brown, Freddie Gibbs, CasIsDead, Loyle Carner and Sonnyjim.

Music media figures have called The Purist's productions "lush and sample heavy", "soulful Blaxploitation infused", "ethereal and eerie", and "cinematically moody". He has self described himself as a "purveyor of luxury rap beats".

Lord also founded and works as creative director of record label Daupe!, which has released music from Westside Gunn, Conway the Machine, Ghostface Killah and Mach Hommy.

The Purist's production credits include contributions to the Mercury Award-nominated album Yesterday's Gone by Loyle Carner and the album Famous Last Words by 2024 Brit Award winner CasIsDead.

== Career and Works ==
Lord started working in the music industry in the mid-2000s, mostly making music outside of rap. However, he slowly began building up connections with American rappers through his blog Pyrex Scholar which showcased his crate digging sample style. That included with collaborating with Roc Marciano, Westside Gunn and Danny Brown.

In 2010, he decided to found the record label Daupe! to release some of his own collaborations and music from rappers he knew and liked. Daupe!'s ethos of quality over quantity in limited vinyl releases has gathered it a committed following over the years since, including a featured write up from distributor Bandcamp. Daupe! distributed releases, including Westside Gunn's Hitler Wears Hermes and Pray For Paris, were among vinyl marketplace Discogs' most expensive sales in 2022.

"In the digital era where people hold no real value towards music anymore, the idea of paying £20 for a physical piece of vinyl may seem ludicrous. That's why I wanted to make it special – for it to look, feel, and sound amazing – and doing it in limited numbers makes it feel more special," Lord said of his label's distribution choices.

In recent years The Purist's productions have featured in the HBO series Succession, as well as in ad campaigns with Vogue (magazine),Yves Saint Laurent, Levi's and Virgil Abloh's Off-White. His 2022 joint album White Girl Wasted with Sonnyjim saw favourable reviews in music publications like Pitchfork and Stereogum.
