= Farma G =

English rapper

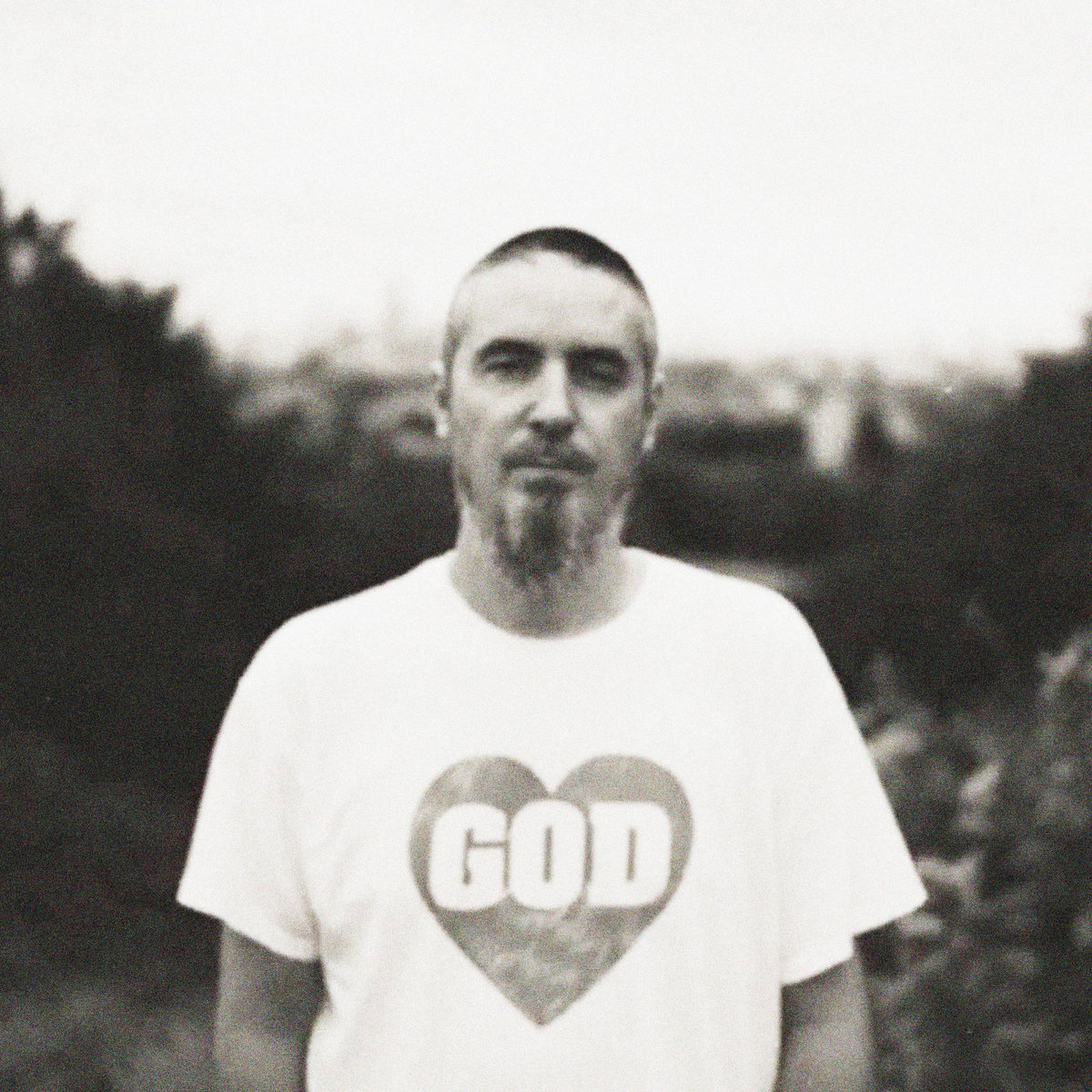
- Farma on Parliament Hill, Hampstead Heath

Background information
- Also known as: FarmaBeats, Farma Jesus Christ The Saviour, The SampleGod
- Born: Robin Coombes
- Origin: Norwich, England
- Genres: Hip Hop
- Occupations: Rapper, Producer
- Years active: 1992–present
- Labels: Music From The Corner, Lowlife, High Focus

Robin Coombes, better known as Farma G, is a rapper and hip-hop producer. He formed one half of UK hip-hop group Task Force along with his brother Chester P, and was a founding member of Bury Crew and the MUD Family. He is the son of musician Peet Coombes.

Farma G and Chester P formed Task Force in 1998 with Mark B and DJ Mr Thing. They released their New Mic Order LP in 1999 produced by Mark B. The group toured the UK and Europe extensively throughout 98/99/00 gaining a solid fanbase. Task Force went on to release Voice Of The Great Outdoors on Lowlife records in 2000, with Farma producing the majority of the tracks.

In 2018 Farma began producing tracks for a range of US underground rap artists including Recognize Ali, Mooch, Mach-Hommy, Jay NICE, WateR, Rome Streetz, and Vinnie Paz.

Farma released The Sentimental Alien LP in 2018 which featured Dirty Dike, Lee Scott, Kashmere, Rome Streetz and Estee Nack.

Farma released Vol.1 & Vol.2 of Farma’s £10 Bag paying homage to Louis Slipperz releases of the early 2000s with production for the likes of Essa, Verb T, Juganaut, Harry Shotta, Jehst, Smellington Piff, CLBRKS, Sleazy F Baby, LeafDog, Tony D.

In January 2025 Farma's debut album How To Kill A Butterfly was released on High Focus Records, featuring production from Farma himself as well as guest production from Smellington Piff, Joe King, dj INSITE and YVNGFACE (Akhavelli), cuts by Jazz T on several tracks plus a feature from Jehst on the track Goat Shit.

== Early years ==
Coombes was born in Norwich and moved to London in 1976 and resided in Highbury Estate, London N5, with his brother Chester P, father Peet Coombes and son Aaron (Remus) who was born in 1992. Farma went to Highbury Quadrant primary school and then Highbury Grove boys school. Farma now resides in Kentish town with his wife and young family.

== Discography ==
- New Mic Order (1999)
- Graff Da bus up / Wah Blow (2000/01)
- Phi Life Cypher / Taskforce – The Chosen Few EP (2001)
- Life Without Instructions (2001)
- Music From the Corner Vol.1 (2001)
- Task Force present Louis Slippers £10 Bag (2002)
- Music From The Corner Vol.2 (2003)
- Task Force present Louis Slippers £10 Bag (Vol.2)
- Music From The Corner Vol.3 (2004)
- Task Force present Louis Slippers £10 Bag (Vol.3)
- Music From The Corner Vol.4 (2006)
- Music From The Corner Vol.5 (2013)
- The Sentimental Alien LP (2018)
- Farma & Son - Est.92 EP (2018)
- Rome Streetz & FarmaBeats - Street Farmacy LP (2018)
- Rome Streetz & FarmaBeats - Kontraband LP (2020)
- Leaf X Farma LP - Consume (2020)
- Farma's £10 Bag Vol.1 (2022)
- Farma's £10 Bag Vol.2 (2023)
- How To Kill A Butterfly (2025)
