= Klashnekoff =

- Also known as: Ricochet Klashnekoff, K-Lash
- Born: Darren Kandler; 1975 (age 50–51); Hornsey, London, England
- Origin: Hackney, London, England
- Genres: Hip hop, Hardcore hip hop
- Occupation: Rapper
- Years active: 2001–present
- Label: Kemet • Altered Ego • Riddim Killa • Abstract Urban

Darren Kandler (born 1975), better known by his stage name Klashnekoff (pronounced K-Lash-Nek-Off) or Ricochet Klashnekoff, is an English rapper from Hackney, London. Klashnekoff was born in Hornsey, but then moved to Hackney where he began his career in rapping. He was the founding member of Terra Firma.

His debut studio album, The Sagas Of..., includes the singles "Murda" produced by UK producer Harry Love (which was later released on the movie album Kidulthood), "Zero", "All I Got" and "Black Rose'" and was released in 2004. Afterwards he released/ Lionheart: Tussle with the Beast, on 26 February 2007. Klashnekoff's last album was released on 12 April 2010 and is called Back to the Sagas. He was nominated for the 2007 BET award for best U.K. Hip-Hop artist.

== Discography ==
=== Albums ===
- The Sagas Of... (2004)
- Lionheart: Tussle with the Beast (2007)
- Back to the Sagas (2010)
- Iona (2019)

=== Mixtapes ===
- Focus Mode (2005)
- Fu*k the Long Talk (2012)

== Sources ==
- Darren Kandler, a.k.a. Klashnekoff (3 September 2007). Murda (YouTube). United Kingdom: itchfm.
