= Lee Scott (rapper) =

- Born: 24 January 1985 (age 41)
- Origin: Runcorn, England
- Genres: Hip hop, Alternative hip hop, UK hip hop
- Years active: 2003 – Present
- Label: Blah Records
- Website: https://blahrecords.com/pages/lee-scott

Lee Scott is an English rapper, author, producer, and co-founder of record label Blah Records.

He has been making hip hop since 2003, and started Blah in 2006. As well as Blah artists, Scott has worked with veteran rapper Jehst on his label YNR and has released music on High Focus Records.

== Early life ==
Born in 1985 to a single mother, Scott was raised in the Castlefields estate of Runcorn, Cheshire. He moved with his mother to Rochdale and Liverpool before returning to Runcorn to work at the Teva Pharmaceuticals factory.

== Style and works ==
Scott has been a member of many rap groups and crews since 2003. These include Cult Mountain, Children (later Cult) of the Damned, Mcabre Brothers and more. He has been described as 'an integral part of Hip-Hop in Britain' and in early 2020 Red Bull selected Blah Records as one of its 'seven UK-based independent labels worth shouting about'. Media figures have noted Scott's ability to promote his and his label's music through limited edition releases and merchandise.

Musically, reviewers have praised his albums for their 'thick layers of peculiarity' with 'contradictory and self-deprecating satire'. Anthony Fantano, of The Needle Drop, called his 2015 High Focus release Butter Fly 'thought provoking, playful, absurd and cynical while pulling jabs at pop culture' and a 'thinking man's hip hop record'.

In 2020, Scott once again collaborated with Jehst, this time under the name GROUP. Their first EP, entitled 1, featured London's Lord Apex. One reviewer called the project "refreshing, profound and emotionally astute".

Scott's debut novel, Swan Songs, was published on 14 December 2021 through Repeater Books.

== Discography ==
=== Solo albums ===
- There Is A Reason For Everything (2023, Blah Records)
- Gate clicks shut (2021, Blah Records)
- Friend, Come To Me And Be Saved (2020, Blah Records)
- Somewhere Between Here and There (2019, Blah Records)
- Lou Reed 2000 (2018, Blah Records)
- Nice Swan (2016, Blah Records)
- Butter Fly (2015, High Focus Records)
- CactusOwlMoonGoat (2014, Blah Records)
- Tin Foil Fronts (2014, Blah Records)
- Put on The Glasses (2008, Blah Records)
- The Wrong Bootleg Demo EP (2006, Blah Records)

=== Collaboration albums ===
- Ortolan & Armagnac (with Sonnyjim) (2023, Blah Records)
- Happy Hour at The Super Fun Time Party Dome Megamix 4000 (with Jam Baxter) (2019, Blah Records)
- Hock Tu 3 (with Reklews as Hock Tu Down) (2018, Blah Records)
- Part Deux: Brick Pelican Posse Crew Gang Syndicate (with Cult of The Damned) (2018, Blah Records)
- Attack of the 50,000 ft SWEG LAWDS from OUTER SPACE (with Black Josh) (2018, Blah Records)
- Stupid Poignant Sh!t (with Illinformed) (2013, Blah Records)
- Grumpy Underground Comeback Sh!t (with Bill Shakes) (2013, Blah Records)
- Gonzo Lyricism (with Monster Under The Bed as Mcabre Brothers) (2011, Blah Records)
- Prozium Peddlin (with Reklews as Hock Tu Down) (2009, Blah Records)
- Mcabre Brothers (with Monster Under The Bed as Mcabre Brothers) (2009, Blah Records)
- Brick Pelican: The Greatest Mystery of All (with Children of The Damned) (2009, Blah Records)
- Tourettes Camp (with Children of The Damned) (2007, Blah Records)

=== Solo EPs ===
- ffsman ep (2020, Blah Records)
- Oh, the Fun We're All Having (2018, Blah Records)
- SUPERGOD5000PLUS (2017, Blah Records)
- Happy Sellout Sh!t (2012, Blah Records)
- Peppered Moth Soup (2012, Blah Records)
- The Wrong Bootleg Demo EP (2006, Blah Records)

=== Collaboration EPs ===
- Friend, Come to Me and be saved (with Morriarchi) (2021, Blah Records)
- GROUP - 1 (with Jehst and featuring Lord Apex) (2020, Blah)
- GOLD DUST (with Bisk & SadhuGold) (2020, Blah Records)
- SUPERGANG (with Milkavelli, Sniff & Sumgii) (2019, Blah Records)
- Tell A Friend (with Milkavelli as Mcabre Brothers & A.H Fly) (2019, Blah Records)
- ADHD Concerto 77 (with Sniff & Jack Chard as Nobodies Home) (2018, Blah Records)
- Disasterpiece EP (with Salar as Antiheroes & Farmabeats) (2017, Blah Records)
- Serotonin PLZ (with Sam Zircon as Eathworm Grim x Goosewater) (2017, Blah Records)
- THINGS TO DO IN HAPPY LAND WHEN UR DEAD (with Trellion & Sumgii as HAPPYPPL) (2017, no label)
- Cult Mountain II (with Cult of The Damned) (2015, Blah Records)
- Cult of The Damned (with Cult of The Damned) (2015, Blah Records)
- B-Movie Millionaires EP (with Black Josh) (2015, Blah Records)
- Cult Mountain (with Trellion, Milkavelli & Sumgii) (2014, no labell)
- UVAVU (with Bill Shakes, King Grubb & Reklews) (2014, Blah Records)
- Flows For The Contemporary Urban Gentleman (with Salar as Antiheroes) (2018, Blah Records)
- Merry Crit Mass (with Monster Under The Bed as Mcabre Brothers) (2012, Blah Records)
- Something Strange (2010, Blah Records)
- Just Drink EP (with Children of The Damned & Brad Strut) (2009, Blah Records)
- Middle Finger Salute Mixtape Vol.1 Antiheroes (Salar & Lee Scott) (2003, Not on label)

=== Singles ===
- MULLET (2020, Blah Records)
- FML (AFTER HOURS MIX) (with Jam Baxter) (2019, Blah Records)
- INABIT (with Milkavelli as Mcabre Brothers) (2019, Blah Records)
- 2 Phones (featuring CHLOBOCOP & Stinkin Slumrok) (2019, Blah Records)
- theysay (with King Grubb, Bill Shakes & Kiyani) (2019, Blah Records)
- 0800 GREY SKIES (with Milkavelli & Stinkin Slumrok) (2019, Blah Records)
- Ceiling / Urn Money (with Jazz T) (2018)
- Reel It In (with Jehst & Strange U) (2016, YNR Productions)
- Mansion 38 / Mr Whippy's Benz (with Jam Baxter & Trellion) (2016, Blah Records)
- NVR MND (2016, Blah Records)
- Powdered Water/Buy, Install (with Salar as Antiheroes) (2010, Blah Records)
