= Lewis Parker (musician) =

British hip-hop producer (born 1977)

- Born: Lewis Parker; 1977 (age 48–49)
- Genres: Hip-hop
- Years active: 1995–present

Lewis Parker is a British hip-hop producer born in London of Barbadian descent. As a teenager, Parker released an EP, B Boy Antiks, and a 12" single, Rise/Visions of Splendour, through Bite It! – a London-based recording label. He signed an album deal with Massive Attack's Virgin Records imprint Melankolic who released his first LP, Masquerades & Silhouettes, in 1998, and follow-up album It's All Happening Now four years later, before he went on to produce a number of records for UK hip-hop artists such as Jehst, The Sundragon and Champions of Nature. Parker has also been credited for his work with Ghostface Killah on the albums Fishscale and More Fish.

On September 1, 2009, he released The Rise and Fall of River Nelson with American rapper River Nelson, and the album received stellar reviews, with Andy Gill from The Independent writing, "The Rise and Fall of River Nelson shows River's thoughtful sentiments and positive attitude set to infectious symphonic-soul beats by British producer Lewis Parker." Parker and Nelson then released River's album The Shape of They Sky in October 2013, with Jamsphere Magazine writing, "It is one of those albums that fascinates you upon first listen and it keeps you hooked until the end."

In 2010, Parker also released a critically acclaimed album with American MC John Robinson called International Summers.

== Discography ==
=== Albums ===
- Masquerades & Silhouettes (The Ancients Series One) (LP) (Melankolic/EMI)(release: 1998)
- It's All Happening Now (The Ancients Series Three) (2xLP) (Melankolic/EMI)(release: 2002)
- Home Grown Hip Hop (LP) (Cavendish Music)(release: 2002)
- Put A Beat 2 a Rhime (LP) (The World of Dusty Vinyl)(release: 2004)
- Mixtape Volume One (Release 2007)(The World of Dusty Vinyl)
- THE PUZZLE episode one THE BIG GAME (2009) (The World of Dusty Vinyl)
- The Rise & Fall of River Nelson (River Nelson & Lewis Parker) (2010) (The World of Dusty Vinyl)
- International Summers (Lewis Parker & John Robinson) (2010) (Project Mooncircle/HHV)
- THE PUZZLE episode two THE GLASS CEILING (2013) (The World of Dusty Vinyl)
- The Shape of the Sky (River Nelson & Lewis Parker) (2013) (DowntownSoul/The World of Dusty Vinyl)

=== EPs ===
- B-Boy Antiks EP (12") (Bite It! Recordings)
- The Options EP (12") (Melankolic/EMI)
- it's all happening now (12") (Melankolic/Virgin/EMI)
- Easter Island (12") (Low life records)

=== Singles ===
- "Wonderwall" (7") (White label)
- "B-Boy Antiks" (12") (White label)
- "Rise" / "Visions of Splendour" (12") (Bite It! Recordings)
- "101 Pianos" (Test Press) (12") (The World of Dusty Vinyl)
- "Shadows of Autumn" / "101 Pianos" (12") (Melankolic)
- "101 Pianos" (12") (The World of Dusty Vinyl)
- "Incognito" / "At Large With A-Cyde" (12") (Melankolic)
- "Incognito" / "At Large With A-Cyde" (Promo) (12") (Melankolic)
- "It's All Happening Now" (Promo) (12") (Melankolic)
- "Blood F/T Lost Souljah/Mr Parker's Siesta" (12") (The World of Dusty Vinyl)
- "High Stakes" (12") (SFDB)
- "The Big Idea" (12") (Canteen)
- "international HEAT"(12") (The World of Dusty Vinyl)

=== Appears on ===
- V/A Operation Overlord – Track: Visions of Splendour (CD/Cass/Vinyl) – Label: Coke Star Produktions/EMI – Release: 1997
- "Champions of Nature" – Tracks: Salsa Smurf, The Fuck Off Song & Finalisation
