= Jehst =

English rapper (born 1979)

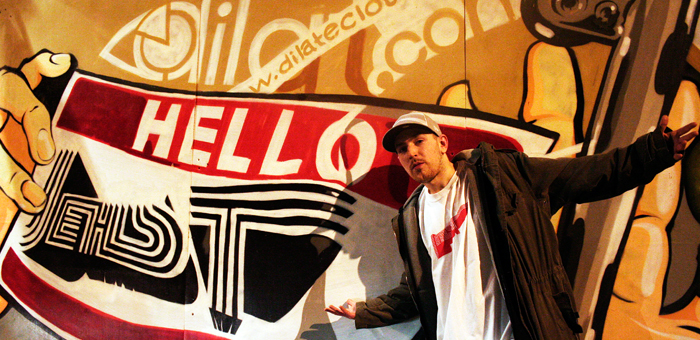

Background information
- Also known as: Billy Brimstone
- Born: William G. Shields; 21 August 1979 (age 47); Kent, England
- Origin: London, England
- Genre: Hip hop
- Occupations: Rapper, producer
- Years active: 1996–present
- Labels: Low Life, Reprezent, YNR
- Website: YNR Productions

William G. Shields (born 21 August 1979), better known by his stage name Jehst, is an English rapper and co-founder of hip hop label YNR Productions.

== Biography ==
Born in Kent in 1979, Jehst spent his early childhood in Crowborough in Sussex before moving to Huddersfield where he went to Honley High School. After being admitted to the LSE in London for a degree in Social Anthropology & Law, Jehst subsequently dropped out due to an offer of a record deal and an opportunity to set up his own label.

His debut release came in 1999 with the Premonitions EP on YNR Productions, which he co-founded with Leeds hip hop artist, Tommy Evans. Premonitions was recorded in Leeds with Evil Ed on production and featuring a number of early YNR artists such as Tommy Evans, Nmonic, Asaviour, Taharka, Usmaan, Nexus 6. An initial run of just 500 copies of the Premonitions EP are thought to have been produced and distributed by hand (these early copies can be distinguished by the blue ink used to print the text on the label.) Jehst's solo career extended further when he appeared on Task Force's EP Voice of the Great Outdoors (2000) with the track 'Cosmic Gypsies', which resulted in a longtime association with Low Life Records. The release of four 12" records on the same label soon followed, while at around the same time in 2002 Jehst was also a pivotal member of the seven-man group Champions of Nature, whose members included AM, Apollo, L. Dolo, Lewis Parker, Profound, and Supa T (a.k.a. The Sundragon). The group eventually released two EPs before disbanding, but not before the final release of the acclaimed album, The Return of the Drifter. Issued in June 2002, it was a double release with an accompanying 11-track CD of the same name. This was essentially a collection of previously released tracks and a cross-section of Jehst's work up to that point.

Furthermore, Shields had begun collaborating with producers such as Harry Love and Lewis Parker to further enhance his status as an established figure within the British hip hop scene. In 2003, he unveiled his debut album proper, Falling Down, which featured guest appearances from Lewis Parker, Supa T, Usmaan and Klashnekoff. Jehst's next solo instalment came in the form of the 2005 effort, Nuke Proof Suit. The following year saw Jehst's production project, Jehst Presents: Underworld Epics come to fruition. In 2007, The Mengi Bus Mixtape was released, accompanied by a string of live shows including a small run of shows in Australia.

Shields has also released material under the name 'Billy Brimstone' on his own label, YNR; the same label responsible for many up and coming and established British hip hop artists.

Jehst's next album The Dragon of an Ordinary Family was released in June 2011. The first single from the album, "Starting Over", was launched by a viral marketing video campaign in which a supposed Jehst fan recorded footage of the rapper appearing as a worker of Royal Mail. 'Jehst Is My Postman' later turned out to be a PR stunt, as this recording was followed up by a music video of the single, featuring many other rappers dressed in a variety of costumes.

Jehst has continued to release both his own and others' music on his label YNR since then, including albums from Confucius MC and others. He has frequently collaborated with other hip hop artists from the UK including Loyle Carner, Lee Scott, Lord Apex and many more.

In 2020, Jehst released a collaborative EP with Blah Records co-founder Lee Scott under the name GROUP.

== Graffiti ==
Jehst was a founding member of a graffiti crew called TCS (The Chemical Soulz) alongside SpyMaD and Reap. TCS were credited with reviving the graffiti scene in Halifax during the mid-1990s. TCS eventually grew to become a large group of graffiti artists and taggers so the more exclusive group PCP was formed as an offshoot to focus on bigger pieces that were more technically challenging. Jehst and SpyMaD joined PCP and were active for a number of years in the North of England with the majority of the groups output being in Halifax and Huddersfield.

== Discography ==
=== Albums ===
- The Return of the Drifter (2002, Low Life)
- Falling Down (2003, Low Life)
- The Dragon of an Ordinary Family (2011, YNR Productions)
- The Dragon of an Ordinary Family: The Remixes (2013, YNR Productions)
- Billy Green is Dead (2017, YNR Productions)
- Mork Calling Orson (2023, YNR Productions)

==== Mixtapes/Productions ====
- Jehst Presents: Underworld Epics (2006, Low Life) (Various Artists)
- The Mengi Bus Mixtape (2005)

=== EPs ===
- Premonitions (1999, YNR)
- Nuke Proof Suit (2005, Reprezent)
- Heathens (2020, YNR)

=== Singles ===
- "Alcoholic Author" ("Nightbreed" featuring Kyza and Klashnekoff on B-side) (2002)
- "Keep it Live" (as 'Billy Brimstone') ("Psychedelic Phlegm" on B-side) (2005, YNR)
- "G.A.M.E.O.V.E.R." (2013, YNR)
- "Reel It In" (with Lee Scott & Strange U) (2016, YNR)

=== Appearances ===
- 'Finalisation' from Champions of Nature's – Finalisation EP (2000)
- 'Breakfast' of Champions from Champions of Nature – Finalisation EP (2000)
- 'The Bodyclock' from Nmonic's 'Voice Mail' EP (YNR Productions) (2000)
- 'Carpe Diem' from Champions of Nature – The Fuckoff EP (2000)
- 'Jazzy Styles', 'Finalisation', Breakfast', 'Carpe Diem', 'Salsa Smurf', 'C'mon! (C.O.N.)' from Champions of Nature – Self Titled LP (2000)
- 'Cosmic Gypsies' from Task Force's Voice of the Great Outdoors EP (2000)
- 'Riviera Hustle' from Braintax's album Biro Funk (2001)
- 'Communications', 'Cold Sun' and 'Seasons of Espionage' from the Lewis Parker album It's all happening Now (2002)
- 'It's All Live' from DJ MK's compilation Westwood UK Hip Hop 2002 Vol. 1
- 'Adventures in New Bohemia' and 'City Sickness' from the Low Life Records compilation Food (2003)
- 'Freedom Fighters' from The Answer & Genesis mixtape FTP Radio Vol 17 (2003)
- 'Weed' from Evil Ed's mixtape The Enthusiast (2004)
- 'Fantastic 4' from Rhaja's album Tierre Caliente (2004)
- 'Freestyle Exclusive' from DJ Louis Slipperz mixtape Task Force Presents DJ Loius Slipperz: £10 Bag, Volume 1 (2004)
- 'The Guns Of Navarone' from the Micall Parknsun album The Working Class Dad (2005)
- 'E.V' and 'Suicide' from the LG & Biscuit album Smoke Rings (2006)
- 'Souls Of The Unborn' from the Kashmere album In The Hour Of Chaos (2006)
- 'Concrete Shoes' from the Sir Smurf Lil album Myalpha (2006)
- 'Money in the Bank' and 'Findaz Keepaz' from the Asaviour album The Borrowed Ladder (2006)
- 'Equal Portions' from the Verb T album Bring It Back To Basics (2006)
- 'Sound of the Drum' from the Yungun album Grown Man Business (2006)
- 'Water Torture' from Cee Why's album Kidulthood OST (2006)
- 'Winterland' from the Verb T and The Last Skeptik album Broken Window (2007)
- 'Move' With Micall Parknsun, From HMD's One Pursuit (2007)
- 'Centre of the Sun' from the Kashmere album Raiders of the Lost Archives (2008)
- 'Sleepy Little Town' from the Jack Flash album The Union Jack Album (2008, Klink Records)
- 'Dysekta into Bass 31' from the DJ Nonames mixtape Strictly Grizzness (2009, Dented Records)
- 'We Won't Mind' from the Thundamentals album Sleeping on Your Style (2009)
- 'Dust' from The Optimen's album The Out of Money Experience (2010)
- 'I Can' from Bliss n Eso's album Running on Air (2010)
- 'The Long and Short of it All' from Get Cape. Wear Cape. Fly's album Maps (2012)
- 'Connect The SPDIF' from The Purist "Connect The SPDIF" EP (2012)
- 'In The Sky' from Author's album Forward Forever (2013)
- 'Doubledecker' from IF's album Rap (2015)
- 'Campbell & Algar' from the Morriarchi album Buggzville (2016)
- 'Wolf at the Door' from Project Mooncircle's 15th Anniversary Sampler (2017)
