= Chester P =

British rapper (born 1976)

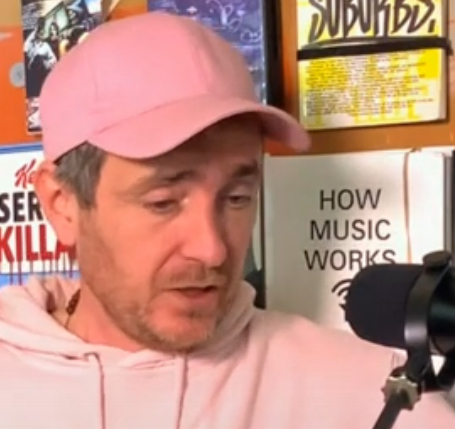
- Chester P in 2023

Background information
- Born: Joey Coombes; 21 June 1976 (age 50)
- Origin: Canonbury, London, England
- Genres: Hip hop
- Occupation: Rapper
- Years active: 1992–present
- Label: Music From The Corner
- Member of: Task Force

Joey Coombes (born 21 June 1976), better known as Chester P, is a British rapper. He was a founding member of Task Force, Bury Crew and the M.U.D. Family. He and his brother Farma G are both sons of musician Peet Coombes.

Chester P Hackenbush's style has been noted as 'psychedelic', and has been described as the influences to many artists since 1993. He has been described as one of the pioneering UK hip hop artists who has shaped the scene of the art form.

Chester P's name was taken from The Chester P. Hackenbush Trilogy which are a collection of graphic novels, featured in an early eighties book, with other graphic novels called Brainstorm, written by Bryan Talbot.

== Early years ==
Coombes was born in Sunderland but grew up in Canonbury, North London and still lives there today with his brother Farma G, his nephew Remus and his mother. His father, Peet Coombes, a musician, was a former member of the late-1970s new wave band The Tourists.

== Discography ==
- New Mic Order (1998) (Mark B presents)
- From the Ashes (LP, 2007)
- Survive or Die Trying (New Mic Order Part 1) (mixtape, 2008)
- New Mic Order Part 2 (mixtape, 2011)
- The Postapocalyptic Story Teller (2018)
- From the Ashes (2018)
- The Nameless Project (LP, 2019)
- Fire In The Streets (Maxx Watt Remix 2026)

== Singles and EPs ==
- "Oh No!"/"Chessmonster" (12", 2007)
