= Blah Records =

- Parent company: Blah Records Limited
- Founded: 2006
- Founder: Lee Scott, DJ Molotov
- Genre: British hip hop, alternative hip hop
- Country of origin: United Kingdom
- Official website: https://blahrecords.com

Blah Records Limited
- Trade name: Blah Records
- Type: Private limited company
- Industry: Music, Live Events, Clothing
- Founded: September 6 or 7th 2016
- Founder: Lee Scott, Salar Saajedi
- Headquarters: London, United Kingdom
- Key people: Lee Scott, Salar Saajedi
- Owner: Lee Scott, Salar Saajedi
- Website: https://blahrecords.com

Blah Records is a British hip hop and alternative hip hop record label owned and managed by Lee Scott and Salar Saajedi. It was founded by Lee Scott and producer Molotov (who was part of the management of High Focus Records for a number of years, then later returned to the management team at Blah) in 2006, with label rapper Milkavelli (then Monster Under the Bed) also originally listed as a director. They originally started the label to release the music of their rap posse Children of the Damned. That group later evolved into Cult of the Damned, featuring many label artists.

Since founding, Blah Records has been praised by media figures for their "unique promotional strategies" and pseudo cult inspired branding. Their sound has been described as somewhat boom-bap hip-hop oriented, but also eclectic and psychedelic while "inverting hip-hop cliches."

== History ==
Alex Jennings, aka Molotov, and Lee Scott started Blah in 2006 to release Children of the Damned records. Although Lee and Salar are from Runcorn and Wirral respectively, both near Liverpool in the North of England, the origin of artists releasing on Blah, including Stinkin Slumrok and Milkavelli varies, with multiple areas and even nations represented, the aforementioned hailing from London and having been associated with the London skateboarding scene in the South. Later label signings have included Black Josh from Manchester, Danny Lover from Canada and Nah Eeto from Kenya. This led Red Bull Music to describe Blah's sound as "intercity".

Around 2008/2009, Stephen Makinson, aka producer Reklews, joined up with Blah and eventually became a label manager around 2010, taking over duties from Molotov who had left the label by this point to move back to his native Switzerland. Reklews left his label role in 2016, but stayed on as an artist releasing music on the label. His managerial duties were taken over by Blah rapper, producer and Cult of the Damned member Salar, who began his label duties in 2015, but was a founding Children of The Damned member and Blah artist since the label's beginning. Lee Scott and Salar are the current managers, directors and shareholders of the label today. Salar is listed as the Managing Director (CEO) and Lee Scott is listed as the Creative Director. Reklews was also listed as a Director until 2017. Blah Records has been a registered business with Companies House twice, between 2006 and 2009 (when they dissolved) and then ongoing since 2016.

In 2019, The British Library approached Blah Records, asking to add their full discography at the time, and all subsequent releases to their Sound and Moving Image Catalogue of British culture.

=== Cult of the Damned ===
In 2015, Blah records' artists came together to record a posse cut titled Cult of the Damned. This was a rebranding of the earlier group Children of the Damned. As Cult of The Damned they have released three studio projects to date, in 2015, 2018, and 2021. Cult of The Damned: Part Deux Brick Pelican Posse Crew Gang Syndicate made it onto DJ Mag's 50 Best of Albums of 2018.
