= Boom bap =

Music production style and hip hop subgenre

- Etymology: Onomatopoeic; from the characteristic kick-snare pattern
- Stylistic origins: East Coast hip-hop; hardcore hip-hop
- Cultural origins: Late 1980s – early 1990s, Northeastern United States

Subgenres
- Jazz rap

Boom bap is a subgenre of hip-hop and music production style that was prominent in East Coast hip-hop during the golden age of hip-hop from the late 1980s to the early 1990s.

The term "boom bap" is an onomatopoeia that represents the sounds used for the bass (kick) drum and snare drum, respectively. The style is usually recognized by a main drum loop that uses a hard-hitting, acoustic bass drum sample on the downbeats, a snappy acoustic snare drum sample on the upbeats, and an "in your face" audio mix emphasizing the drum loop, and the kick-snare combination in particular.

Key producers include DJ Premier, Pete Rock, Buckwild and Diamond D. Prominent hip hop artists who incorporated "boom bap" in their music include Gang Starr, KRS-One, A Tribe Called Quest, Wu-Tang Clan, MF Doom, Mobb Deep, Craig Mack, R.A. the Rugged Man, Big L, Boot Camp Clik, Griselda, Jay-Z, Common, Yasiin Bey, Nas, and The Notorious B.I.G.

== History ==
The term boom bap originated in 1984 when it was used by T La Rock to describe the beat of the kick drum and the snare in the song "It's Yours". T La Rock spoke in an off-script fashion, using the words "boom bap" to mimic the sound of the rhythm. This was the first recorded onomatopoeic expression of the beat. The term later became a universal name for the subgenre of hip hop as a whole. DJ Premier suggested that boom bap existed before the production of "It's Yours". He states the term was used by the wider hip-hop community as a term to describe all hip hop and the beat that is produced for it. The subgenre became increasingly better known when KRS-One released an album under the title Return of the Boom Bap. The success of the album popularised the term boom bap.

=== Development of the style ===
The original songs produced within the subgenre used the actual sounds of kick drums and hard-hitting snare drums or samples from vinyl records. The focus originally was on the simplicity of the beat whereas in later developments of the subgenre electronic samplers and beatmakers were used to generate the iconic beat. Over time more percussion instruments were added to add to the complexity of the beat. Some examples of percussion instruments included were shakers, tambourines, bongos, cowbells, and especially hi hats. Musical programmers used digital sampling synthesizers to create more complex layers of sampled sounds and multi-layered drumbeats. The original artist recognised by the hip hop industry as the first to experiment with these samples in boom bap was DJ Marley Marl. The main purpose in using electronic instruments for the production of the music was to take the tedious repetition of the beat out of the creative process. This allowed artists to focus more on their lyrics and the meaning they were trying to convey.

=== Notable producers ===
DJ Premier and Pete Rock gained notable fame as producers for their work within the boom bap industry. These artists believe that the subgenre demonstrates "strength and power" through its harsh-sounding beat and roughness. Boom bap was known for its popularity on the East Coast of the US and in particular its roots in New York. Where the West Coast hip hop scene displayed elements of smoothness, the East Coast and boom bap focused on hard edges and strong beats. These artists in particular pioneered the subgenre by focusing on the rough elements of a stripped back beat and a strong focus on the lyrics.

== The beat ==
KRS-One when describing the beat common to the subgenre states "The vibe of boom bap is to use the least amount of instruments to create the most rhythmic sound".

The typical boom bap beat will be a loop of quarter notes. The first and the third being the kick drum and the second and fourth the snare. The beat has become synonymous with the golden age of hip hop. More modern hip-hop songs are influenced by boom bap and the underlying tone that is common to all songs in the subgenre. The balance of the music tracks are brought together by the prominent kick and snare drum. The timbre is brought about by "the emphasized low end of the kick drum and the presence of the hard-hitting snare drum". The arrangement of the beat is made of the isolated drum hits and other brief instrumental hits from percussion instruments. The rhythmic qualities of the beat are made up of highly swung programming, which can be produced either by a deliberate delay in the analogue percussion hits or by a quantization algorithm programmed on an electronic sampler. Other qualities that are present in boom bap rhythm are "tight drum-instrumental syncopation", "re-arranged phrases or rhythms", and "percussive programming of instrumental phrases". When an artist or producer wished to add even more complexity or intense sounds to their track they could use a synthesiser. A common practise within boom bap was to use sub-synthesis. This extra element would increase the amplitude of the bass and also intensify the sound of the kick drum. This was a desirable feature of the hip hop style's unpolished and harsh style.

The beat is designed to "exist solely as a basis for the artist to rap over". It intends to be "visceral and rousing, it is hip hop at its brawniest".

=== Scratching ===
The beat in some boom bap songs is interrupted by scratching, the process in which a disc jockey or hip hop producer will forcefully move the vinyl record back and forth underneath the needle. This can also by achieved by using some CDs. The purpose of scratching was to disjoint the flow of the beat, to add some complexity or to develop a bridge in the song. It was effective for rap battles and breaks in a rapper's delivery. Scratching can also encompass the use of multiple vinyls, allowing the DJ to experiment with other works within the scope of their own song. A scratch hook can be used as a method of sampling. For example, DJ Premier's songs would often have a scratch hook of vocals. He commonly implemented this into his chorus.

== Sampling ==
Sampling is used in boom bap music to enhance the beat beyond a simple drum pattern. Since the foundations of the beat are designed to be minimalistic, samples are used to add to the rhythm of the song and to create more diversity in the sounds. Two of the most common electronic samplers used in this style are the Akai MPC and the SP1200. Composers in this style use ‘short excerpts of the audio from a previous recording, recontextualized into a new composition’. This can be heard in LL Cool J's "Around the Way Girl", a song and artist that utilizes boom bap features to create the hip hop beat.

Swing quantization is used to create a more complex sound. It allows the producer to keep precision on the 'on' beats and to offset the 'off' beats by a small margin. This influences the rhythmic flow of the piece. In this process, the producer is able to edit the timing of the musical performance. The music sample can be stretched or condensed, and in some cases the beats are manipulated directly to achieve a perfect synchronisation. Swing quantization looks to provide a ratio of perfectly timed beats to off-timed beats. The swing ratio can be adjusted on samplers such as the Akai MPC series.

The general consensus at times was that electronic samplers brought a machine-like element to the style of music. To maintain a human feel to the style, drum touch pads on the MPC and SP1200 were used so that artists could input their chosen samples at times they thought was best for the feel and the rhythm of the music. The addition of touch pads allowed the artist to add improvements in "not just timing, but also accents and velocity variations".

== Lyrics ==
Boom bap music is often accompanied by rapping. As boom bap instrumentals are characteristically sparse, the rapping plays an important role in boom bap songs, as it is the rapper and their lyrics who generally provide a song with its most distinctive sound. The simplicity of the beat also provides the rapper with latitude to focus more prominently on presenting their opinions and narratives.

The lyrical content in boom bap has been variously characterized as introspective and conversational, raw and direct, or macho and dominant. Boom bap rappers generally avoid "catchy or commercial" sounds. To that end, boom bap songs frequently eschew a chorus or sonic climax, instead using the song as a means to tell a story or discuss a chosen topic with the audience. Boom bap lyrics frequently focus on topics that reflect the African-American social experience on the East Coast of the United States in the 1980s and 1990s, such as gang violence, social neglect, gentrification, drugs, wealth, sex, and life in segregated neighborhoods.

In terms of technique, boom bap rapping follows major lyrical conventions within hip hop, such as multi-syllabic rhyming, battle rapping and insults, sociological observations, puns and wordplay, and poetic devices such as extended metaphors or alliteration. The rapper's delivery and cadence are structured to best complement the beat.

Boom bap music is sometimes conflated with hardcore hip hop, which exhibits a similar style of "aggressive" and "street-style" rapping; however, boom bap as a subgenre is characterized more by the auditory experience of the beat rather than by the content of the lyrics.

== Popularity ==
The subgenre of boom bap was popularised by KRS-One and his album Return of the Boom Bap. This album reached its peak on the United States weekly album chart the Billboard 200 at number 37 on 16 October 1993. The album also peaked at number 5 on the Billboard Top R&B/Hip-Hop Albums on the same day that the album peaked on the top 200.

Boom bap began to gain popularity in the 1980s, but it had limited recognition on mainstream popular music charts. It existed more as an underground type of music. The beat is often made synonymous with New York hip hop in the era. Welbeck states that "the poly-rhythms of the 'boom-bap' rhythmic phrasings became a fixture of New York rap music in the late 1980s".

The boom bap movement after hitting its peak in the early 1990s made its way across the Atlantic and infiltrated some of the European music scenes. Boom bap can often be found as a foundation for many modern day English rappers, which exhibit similar on-off beat. Boom bap also had a prominent influence on south-east Asia in the late 1990s and early 2000s.

Boom bap is recognized as delivering some of the founding elements of modern hip hop and rap music by many people associated with the music genre. The style is considered to be simple, making it easy to adapt and for artists to make their own impression upon the work.

== The decline of boom bap ==
Due to much tighter copyright laws in the United States and around the world in recent years, the accessibility for sampling and regenerating sounds based on other's work has become increasingly difficult. Some modern artists working for large record labels enjoy production budgets that permit them to pay to use others' work. However, this limits home-grown music production and thus leads hip hop enthusiasts to other more accessible forms of hip hop. Artists moved away from sampling due to financial and career risks. One's creative ability can also be impacted when choosing to sample within a song. Hence, an overall drive for new content has emerged in the music industry.

Phillip Mlynar states that in the modern world "the notion of tagging something as boom bap has become more of a backhanded compliment. The phrase is frequently applied to East Coast hip hop to suggest that its architects are dated and trading on former glories".

In the London music scene boom bap is well known for its "hard bass drum" and "snapping snare", but it is commonly associated with "old school" tracks.

== Modern usage ==
Although not really popular, in the recent years boom bap has seen a small resurgence. In 2019, the Bristol-based rapper Wish Master (Liam Wish Kole) released an album called Boom Bap to the Future, and used the rhythmical quality as the foundation of the album's instrumental scoring, as well an allegory for retaining artistic self-control. However, critics were not entirely happy with the album, referring to its weak textual life, although commendable attempts at reviving the forgotten style. Another regeneration of the boom bap style is being constructed through the London-based music collective called Sons of Boom Bap (S.O.B), whose mission is to reignite interest and lend social status to the old-school aesthetics of rapping, which include boom bap and other foundational stylistic attributes.

With influence of platforms such as Verzuz, multiple artists have released singles or full length projects with a boom bap aesthetic: J. Cole, Griselda, Redman, DJ Kay Slay, Lloyd Banks, the HRSMN, and Rosenberg among others. Current UK artists such as Triple Darkness, who have been called the UK's Wu Tang Clan, and Jam Baxter, another British lyricist, predominantly produce "boom bap" songs.
