= Verb T =

- Also known as: Bird T, Dick Trusay
- Born: Thomas Conning; 11 January 1981 (age 45); London, England
- Genre: Hip hop
- Occupation: Rapper
- Years active: 1999–present
- Labels: Low Life, YNR Productions, High Focus Records, In The Balance Records
- Formerly of: The Four Owls
- Website: High Focus

Thomas Conning (born 11 January 1981), better known by the stage name Verb T is a UK hip-hop artist based in London.

== Biography ==
Verb T has released 10 albums and six EPs as well as numerous singles.

His first release was the 12-track EP Backhand Slap Talk / Technical Illness which was a shared release featuring songs from fellow London-based rapper Kashmere. It was released on Low Life Records.

This was followed by his debut album Bring It Back To Basics which was a collaborative release featuring production by former Scratch Perverts DJ Harry Love.

In 2011, Verb T formed a group with artists Fliptrix, Leaf Dog and BVA MC, known as The Four Owls. The lead single Not Like Before and following album Nature's Greatest Mystery have seen The Owls touring solidly in the UK throughout 2012 with DJ Madnice. The Verb T album Morning Process (Waking Up) was released in September 2012 on High Focus Records.

Verb T's first self produced album I Remain was released in 2013 on High Focus Records.

The Four Owls released an album in 2015 called The Natural Order which featured the well-known US producer DJ Premier.

In 2018, Verb T and Pitch 92 created four original tracks for the programme Just Another Immigrant which aired in the USA on Showtime and in the UK on Sky Atlantic starring Romesh Ranganathan.

In the same year Verb T and Pitch 92 also composed and performed the title track for the Sky One sitcom The Reluctant Landlord.

In 2019, the second series of Reluctant Landlord was released and in addition to the title track, Verb T and Pitch 92 created original music used throughout the series and in the Christmas Special which aired on 23 December 2019 on Sky One.

== Releases ==
- The single Ill Lyrical Behaviour (Apeman records)
- The single Showbitchness (Low Life Records)
- The EP Backhand Slap Talk / Technical Illness 2004 (Low Life Records)
- The EP I'm Not That Guy 2005 (with Juice) (Pepa Records)
- The single Delusion (Silent Soundz)
- The LP Bring It Back To Basics 2006 (with Harry Love) (Silent Soundz)
- The single Satisfied (Silent Soundz)
- The LP Broken Window 2005 (with The Last Skeptic) (Silent Soundz)
- The LP Verbs with a Vengeance 2008 (Thomas Records)
- The LP Serious Games 2010 (Ynr Productions)
- The EP Self Ish 2011 (High Focus Records)
- The EP Self Less 2011 (High Focus Records)
- The LP Nature's Greatest Mystery (as part of The Four Owls) 2011 (High Focus Records)
- The EP More Dynamite 2012 (High Focus Records)
- The LP Morning Process (Waking Up) 2012 (High Focus Records)
- The LP I Remain 2013 (High Focus Records)
- The EP Medicated Dreams 2014 (High Focus Records)
- The LP Natural Order 2015 (as part of The Four Owls) (High Focus Records)
- The LP The Man with the Foggy Eyes 2015 (with Illinformed) (High Focus Records)
- The LP Good Evening 2017 (with Pitch 92) (High Focus Records)
- The LP A Question of Time 2019 (with Pitch 92) (High Focus Records)
- The LP Nocturnal Instinct 2020 (as part of The Four Owls) (High Focus Records)
- The LP The Land of the Foggy Skies 2020 (with Illinformed) (High Focus Records)
- The LP Stranded in Foggy times 2021 (with Illinformed) (High Focus Records)
- The LP Found In The Fog 2023 (with Illinformed) (Independent)
- The LP The Tower Where The Phantom Lives 2023 (with Vic Grimes) (High Focus Records)
- The LP Restoration 2024 (with Malek Winter) (Independent)
- The EP Homer Loan 2024 (Independent)
- The single Verify 2025 (with Micall Parknsun) (Independent)
- The single Topsy Turvy 2025 (with Beano, Graham, Donkobz & No Venom) (Outstraight Records)
- The single Spliffin 2025 (with Graham & Hikii) (Outstraight Records)
- The single Who? 2025 (with Panda Drey & No Venom) (Outstraight Records)
- The single Contrast 2025 (with Graham, Beano & No Venom) (Outstraight Records)
- The EP Homer loan 2 2025 (High Focus)
- The LP To Love A Phantom 2025 (with Vic Grimes) (High Focus)

== Appearances ==
- Showbitchness from the Lowlife Records compilation Food (2002)
- Exactly from the Ghost EP Ghost Stories (2004)
- Headtrip from the Copperpot album 'Chapter 7' (2005)
- Soul Cry from the Manage album Live In Protest (2006)
- Black Sea from the Kashmere album In The Hour Of Chaos (2006)
- Opium Foetus from the Kashmere album In The Hour Of Choas (2006)
- Various tracks from the Ghost album Seldom Seen Often Heard (2006)
- Pick A Subject from the Braintax album Panorama (2006)
- Just Let Me from the album EV Records Presents: Everything (2007)
- Why Do You Try from the Fliptrix album Force Fed Imagery (2007)
- Alternate Take & Jealousy's a Bitch from the Jon Phonics compilation Half Past Calm (2008)
- Dynamite from the Sonny Jim album Trading Standards (2008)
- Mine for the Taking from the Skreintax album The Scene Stealers (2008)
- Frozen in Time and Invisible World from the Ghost album Freedom of Thought (2009)
- Cracked It from the Asaviour and DJ IQ album A Loop Theory (2009)
- Own Zone & "life We Lead from the Fliptrix album Theory of Rhyme (2010)
- Everything from the Jam Baxter album Rinse out Friday / Spack out Monday (2010)
- Time and a Place from the Leaf Dog album From a Scarecrow's Perspective (2011)
- Nothing's Quite as it Seems from the Fliptrix album Third Eye of the Storm (2012)
- Squashed from the Jam Baxter album Gruesome Features (2012)
