= Braintax =

British rapper and record producer

- Also known as: Joey Brains; Brando Flux
- Born: Joe Christie
- Genres: British hip hop
- Occupations: Rapper, record producer
- Years active: 1990–2008
- Label: Low Life

Joe Christie, better known as Braintax, is a British rapper and record producer. Christie had also recorded or appeared under the pseudonyms Brando Flux and Joey Brains. All of his releases were on his own record label, Low Life Records.

Originally Braintax was a duo, consisting of Christie and DJ Test who also contributed vocals and production. Test departed following the 1997 release of the Future Years EP and Christie retained the Braintax name; it has since become synonymous with him as a solo artist. On the track "Monsoon Funk" on Panorama, Christie explained Braintax means "we can all get busy if we use our brains." Braintax's lyrics have made multiple references to spirituality, healthy eating, the state of hip hop music, environmentalism, and politics. On Mr. Scruff's 2002 album Trouser Jazz, Braintax was featured on the song "Vibrate".

In 2008, Braintax suddenly announced his retirement with the release of his final album titled My Last and Best Album and also the end of Low Life Records.

== Discography ==
=== Albums ===
- Biro Funk (2001)
- Panorama (2006)
- My Last and Best Album (2008)

=== Singles and EPs ===
- Fat Head EP (1992)
- Future Years EP (1997)
- The Travel Show EP (1999)
- Hard Working EP (2000)
- "Don't Drag Me In" (2001)
- "Riviera Hustle" (2002)
- "Godnose" (2002)
- Chapter Seven – Verse Two EP "Out the Bunker" (2003)
- "D90 Rules" (2006)
- "Run the Yards" (2006)
- "Syriana Style" (2006)

== Low Life Records ==
Low Life Records was an independent record label from London established in 1992, promoting and releasing UK hip hop music.

=== History ===
Low Life was owned by Braintax. The label's signed artists included many UK hip hop artists such as; Braintax himself, Task Force, Skinnyman, Jehst, Harry Love, Verb T, Mystro, Asaviour, Dubbledge, Micall Parknsun & Rodney P. Low Life released around 70 records, including 12" singles, EPs and LPs.

=== Cessation ===
Low Life came to an abrupt end in 2008 when Braintax announced his retirement and release of his last record; 'My Last and Best Album'. This came as a shock and disappointment to many UK hip hop fans. According to various sources, many of the artists signed to Low Life felt as if they had been ripped off/underpaid by Braintax – however Braintax stated in an interview, "There's been too much stress, mainly the large amount of bullshit you have to contend with when you run a record label. If you're not ripping people off then you're busy not trying hard enough to sell records that no one wants to buy."
