= Blade (disambiguation) =

A blade is a sharp cutting part, for instance of a weapon or tool.

Blade or Blades may also refer to:

== Arts and entertainment ==
=== Fictional characters ===
- Blade (character), a Marvel Comics character
  - Blade (New Line franchise character)
  - Blade (Marvel Cinematic Universe character)
- Blade (Honkai), a playable character in the Honkai series of video games
- Blade, a character in the Canadian-American martial arts 1995 film Law of the Jungle
- Blade (Lesbian Space Princess), a character in the animated film Lesbian Space Princess (2025)
- Blade (Masters of the Universe), in the Masters of the Universe franchise series
- Blade (Puppet Master), of the Puppet Master horror film franchise
- Blades (Transformers), several robot superhero characters in the Transformers robot superhero franchise
- Blade (Devil May Cry), a class of demons in the video game Devil May Cry
- Richard Blade (series), eponymous hero of an adult fantasy pulp novel series
- Kamen Rider Blade, the eponymous character of a Japanese tokusatsu series

=== Film and television ===
- Blade (1973 film), a film featuring Morgan Freeman
- Blades (film), a 1989 American horror-comedy film
- The Blade (film), a 1995 Hong Kong martial arts film directed by Tsui Hark
- Blade (franchise), three films and a television series based on the Marvel Comics character
  - Blade (1998 film), the first film in the Blade franchise, which was released in 1998
    - Blade (soundtrack), the soundtrack to the first film in the Blade franchise
  - Blade: The Series, set after the events of the last film, which ran in 2006
- Blade (unproduced film), an unproduced reboot of the Blade franchise, set in the Marvel Cinematic Universe
- "Blade" (The Gentle Touch), a 1980 television episode

=== Video games ===
- Blade (2000 video game), for the Game Boy Color and PlayStation, based on the Marvel Comics Character’s first movie by New Line Cinema
- Blades, a fictional organization in The Elder Scrolls series of computer games
- The Elder Scrolls: Blades, a 2019 mobile game in the Elder Scrolls franchise
- Blades, powerful beings in Xenoblade Chronicles 2
- BLADE, a fictional military organization in Xenoblade Chronicles X
- Marvel's Blade, an upcoming video game based on the Marvel Comics character, developed by Arkane Lyon and published by Bethesda Softworks.

=== Other arts and entertainment ===
- The Blades (band), an Irish band
- Blades (hip hop group), an Australian hip hop group from Newcastle, New South Wales
- Blade (artscene group), a group active during the 1990s
- Blades Club, M's private card club featured in several of Ian Fleming's James Bond novels
- Blade (musician), a British rapper originally from Iran
- Blade Study, contemporary art gallery in New York City
- Blades (Earthdawn), a 1995 collection of adventures for the role-playing game Earthdawn

== Computing and technology ==
- Airfoil, for example, the rotor blade on a helicopter or wind turbine
- Blade, a templating engine used in the Laravel PHP framework
- BLADE (software), Block All Drive-by Download Exploits, software developed at Georgia Tech and SRI International
- Blade server, a self-contained computer server, designed for high density
- Blade PC, a form of client or personal computer
- Blade battery, a long-shaped battery manufactured by BYD Company
- Breakthrough Laminar Aircraft Demonstrator in Europe (BLADE), a laminar flow experiment
- Turbine blade, a component of a gas turbine or steam turbine
- ZTE Blade, a cellphone manufactured by the ZTE Corporation
- Honda Blade , a motorcycle brand by Honda

== Biology ==
- Blade (algae), another word for lamina, a leaf-like structure on seaweed
- Blade or lamina, the (usually) flattened part of a typical plant leaf
- Botanical term for the wider distal part of a petal, sepal or bract
- Scapula, a bone in the human body sometimes referred to as the shoulder blade
- Tongue blade, the part of the tongue just behind the tip

== People ==
- Blade (artist), gay erotic artist
- Blade Tidwell (born 2001), American baseball player
- Blade (surname)
- Blades Brown (born 2007), American professional golfer
- Blades (surname)
- Blade, a ring name of Al Green (wrestler) (1955–2013), American professional wrestler

== Places ==
- Blades, Delaware, a town in Delaware, United States
- Blades, Saint Philip, Barbados, a village in Saint Philip, Barbados
- The Blade, Manchester, a residential skyscraper in Manchester, England
- The Blade, Reading, a high-rise building in Reading, England

== Publications ==
- The Blade (Toledo), a newspaper in Toledo, Ohio
- Washington Blade, a gay newspaper
- The New York Blade, a gay newspaper
- Monthly Comic Blade, a monthly manga anthology magazine
- Blade (magazine), a knife collecting magazine

== Sports ==
=== Teams ===
- Batangas Blades, a defunct Filipino basketball team
- Chengdu Blades F.C., a Chinese football club
- Kansas City Blades, a defunct American ice hockey team
- Los Angeles Blades, an inline hockey team in California
- Saskatoon Blades, a Western Hockey League franchise
- Sheffield United F.C., an English football club nicknamed "The Blades"
- Sheffield Wednesday F.C., an English football club formerly nicknamed "The Blades"

=== Equipment ===
- Inline skates, colloquially known as "blades" or "roller blades"
- Football boots with moulded studs, commonly known as "blades"
- A component of a spinnerbait fishing lure
- Blade, a part of an oar (sport rowing); also the whole oar
- Muscle-back iron or blade, a type of golf club, referring to the shape of an iron's clubhead
- A type of lower leg prosthesis used by amputee athletes in running events

=== Mascots ===
- Blades the Bruin, the mascot of the Boston Bruins ice hockey team

== Other uses ==
- Blade (company), a crowdsourced short-distance aviation company
- Blade (geometry), a generalization of vectors in higher-dimensional vector spaces in geometric algebra
- Blade (studio), a Japanese animation studio
- FreeX Blade, a German paraglider design
- Toyota Blade
- Blade, an often curved metal plate on the front of a bulldozer
- Blade, a station ident for British television channel BBC Two from the 1991–2001 series
- The Blades (aerobatic team), a British aircraft display team
- Blades, a modish London tailoring establishment founded in 1962 by Rupert Lycett Green
- Bristol Laboratory for Advanced Dynamics Engineering
- HNLMS Z 5 (1915), a Dutch torpedo boat which was renamed Blade while serving in the British Royal Navy in World War II
- Honda Wave series motorcycle, its sporty version was sold in Indonesia as Honda Blade

== See also ==
- Blading (professional wrestling), to cut oneself in order to draw blood for dramatic effect
- Bladee, a Swedish rapper/songwriter
- Bladezz, a character in The Guild (web series)
