= BluRum13 =

American rapper

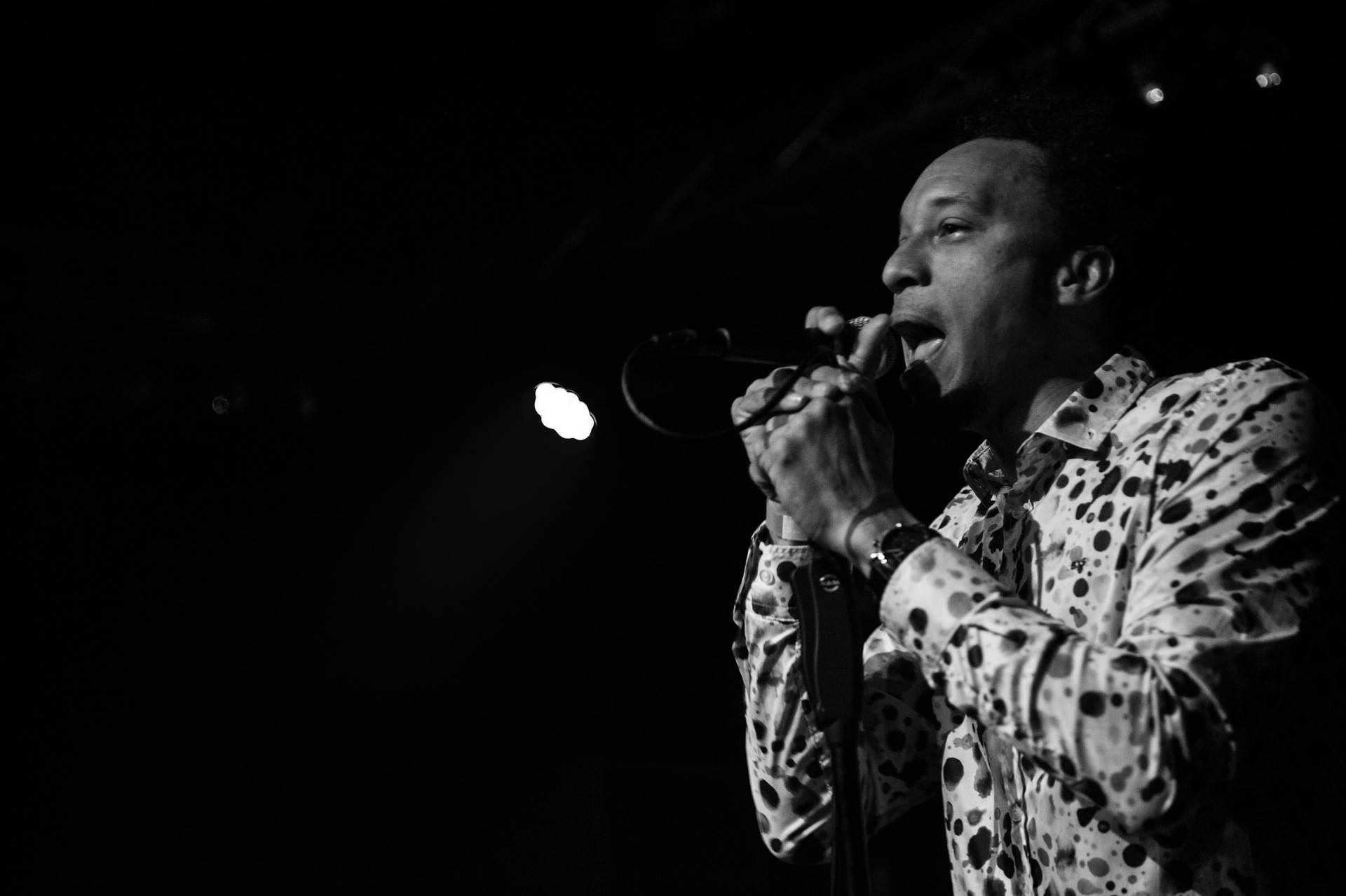
- BluRum13 at the Krempel Club in Switzerland

Background information
- Also known as: Blurum13, Blu Rum 13, BluRum 13, Killah Platypus
- Born: New York, New York, United States
- Origin: Washington D.C. United States
- Genres: New school hip hop Underground hip hop Funk; Jazz; Electronic
- Occupations: Rapper, singer, songwriter, record producer, actor
- Instruments: Vocals
- Years active: 1990-present
- Labels: Ropeadope, Tokyo Dawn, Besides Records, BBE, Ninja Tune, Jazz Fudge, Beatgeeks
- Website: www.blurum13.com

BluRum13 (alternate spellings include Blu Rum 13, BluRum 13, and Blurum 13), born James Sobers, is an American underground rapper, emcee, actor and producer who also uses the pseudonym Killa Platypus. Originally from New York City, he spent most of his formative years in Washington, D.C., and is the great nephew of knighted cricketer Sir Garfield Sobers.

== Career ==
=== Solo projects ===
BluRum13's first album The Previouslee Unreleased Recordings of BluRum13 (not on a label) was the catalyst for subsequent collaborations with London-based DJ Vadim, who included the song It's Obvious on his 2002 release U.S.S.R. Life From the Other Side (Ninjatune, 1990). BluRum toured as the live emcee for Vadim's group The Russian Percussion (also featuring beatboxer Killa Kela, DJ Mr Thing and DJ Woody), which was created to promote the album. BluRum's second album Vaguely Familiar was released on DJ Vadim's label Jazz Fudge, along with singles Sleep Speechless and Figure it Out.

In 2007, BluRum self-released the EP Tether with UK beat boxer Koobs.

In 2013, after multiple collaborations with various artists and bands, BluRum released an online full-length album entitled Inverted.

In 2017, BluRum released Rainbows, Butterflies & Gangstas produced by Australian DJ/Producer and BBE label mate Inkswel (Beatgeeks Records).

In December 2018, BluRum13 released the inaugural track for Galant Records (sister label to Jarring Effects) digital series SEEDS with the single "Trying to Live" featuring the production of Lyon-based producer RXX/R33.

=== Bands and collectives ===
BluRum13 is well known for his work with various bands, producers and collectives in North America, Europe, and Australia. He was part of Montreal-based funk band Bullfrog (featuring Kid Koala) from 1994 to 2004 (Atlantic/Rope-a-Dope Records). In 2005 Vadim and BluRum formed the hip hop group One Self with MC Yarah Bravo, releasing the album Children of Possibility on Ninja Tune, and collaborating with Fat Freddy’s Drop, and Reggie Watts. The group were described by The Times as "best newcomers of 2005" and won Channel 4's Slashmusic Showcase. BluRum was a member of London-based collective True Ingredients and Maryland-based collective Water Power.

BluRum has also collaborated with a number of producers including Luke Vibert with whom he released two albums. The first entitled Smell the Urgency was self-released online in 2004 then re-released on vinyl by France's Besides Records in 2017, while their second full-length album as Bluke entitled "Sense the Urgency" was released in 2019 on double-vinyl by Ropeadope Records. BluRum has been a featured emcee and live front-man for a number of other groups, including US3, Reverse Engineering, Resin Dogs, Aquasky, and many more.

In 2012, BluRum13 released a joint project with Manchester artist Matt Brewer, a.k.a. Frameworks, entitled "The Brickbuilders EP." That same year, BluRum13 began a live show collaboration with acclaimed Spanish jazz drummer Mark Ayza, and also founded the dub-hop/electro step group Indigenous Invaders with DJ Toner (Granada). Indigenous Invaders appeared live at the world's first YouTube music festival in Madrid on September 28, 2012. The band released a single titled "As long as I C" on Jarring Effects label, and in 2014 they released a digital EP titled "Above and Below" on SoundCloud. Indigenous Invaders performed at numerous festivals sharing stage with artists such as Dope D.O.D. and DJ Woody.

In 2017, BluRum13 reunited with former Russian Percussion tour mate DJ Woody and his close collaborator DJ Boca as "BocaWoody," appearing on five songs on their debut Carousel LP and accompanying 7" vinyl.

In 2023, BluRum released a full-length album produced by Adelaide-based producer Inkswel entitled Hypersonic, featuring long-time collaborator DJ Woody and American rapper Guilty Simpson.

=== Film ===
In 2016, James Sobers (a.k.a. BluRum13) played a supporting role as cowboy outlaw “Randy” in the cast of western feature film ‘’’The Price of Death’’’ by Chip Baker, shot in Almeria, Spain.

== Discography ==
=== BluRum13 releases ===
- Hypersonic with Inkswel, Inner Tribe Records 2023
- Sense the Urgency BLUKE with Luke Vibert, Ropeadope Records 2019
- Trying to Live digital release, Galant Records, France 2018
- Smell the Urgency BLUKE with Luke Vibert, Besides Records, France 2017
- Rainbows, Butterflies & Gangstas (12") with Inkswel, MP3 BeatGeeks Records, Germany 2017
- BluConnspiracy Online release 2015
- Inverted (LP) Online release 2013
- The Brickbuilders EP with Frameworks (EP) My First Moth 2012
- Tell Me You Love It (EP) (2 versions) 777 Records 2008
- The Hip Hop EP (12") 777 Records 2008
- Choose To Care (12") The Elephant 2006
- Do It (4 What?) / Be 1 Too / Odds Even (12") Analogic Recordings 2005
- Earthbound / Futuristic B-Boys (12") The Elephant 2005
- "Did You?" Jazz Fudge 2003
- Figure It Out / It Is (12") Jazz Fudge 2001
- Vaguely Familiar (3 versions) Jazz Fudge 2001
- Sleep Speechless / On Course (12") Jazz Fudge 2000

=== Bullfrog ===
- Bullfrog / Robertson – Deeper Shade of Green (Independent) 2004
- Bullfrog – s/t (Ropeadope Records) 2001

=== One Self ===
- Organically Grown EP (November 2006)
- Be Your Own w/Amp Fiddler remix 12” and Ltd Edition (Ninja Tune, April 2005)
- The Blue Bird/Fear The Labour 12” (Ninja Tune, May 2005)
- Children Of Possibility LP (Ninja Tune, June 2005) with Yarah Bravo and BluRum13.
- Paranoid/Over Expose/Come Along 12” (Ninja Tune, September 2005)

=== True Ingredients ===
- Who's Next single (2010)
- Prepare & Assemble album (2008)
- All Out single (2005)

=== Featured On ===
- Chosen Planetself High Tide Tokyo Dawn Records, 2018
- Chaos Woxow Alcazar Little Beat More, 2018
- Carousel LP BocaWoody (DJ Boca, DJ Woody) 2017
- Jump (Single) 7" vinyl BocaWoody 2017
- Flip the Scripture The Allergies As We Do Our Thing (LP, Full-length album) Jalapeno Records, 2016
- Lost In A Vortex Berlin Eggsile (CD, Album, Jak) Jarring Effects 2010
- Stormy Minds Figure One (A JFX Studio Session) (12", White Album) Jarring Effects 2010
- Defiance Future Shock Highly Complex Machinery (CD, Album, Dig) Jarring Effects 2010
- Alignment Battlefield (2xLP, Album) Jarring Effects 2008
- Alignment French Dub System 2008 (CD, Comp) Wagram 2008
- Choose To Care Targets (Album) (2 versions) Discograph 2008
- Channels Just Banks Under The Influence (CD, Enh) Etage Noir Recordings 2008
- There Are Things... Closed (2xCD, Album) All Soundz 2007
- Choose To Care DJ Netik – Champion Sounds (CD, Mixed) DMC 2007
- DTTR (12") (Total Terror mix) Jarring Effects 2007
- End Game Resin Dogs More (CD, Album, Dig) Hydrofunk Records 2007
- The Soundcatcher Extras (Album) (2 versions) Quand Vient La Nuit BBE 2007
- Invisible Soldiers Olven Миледи (CD, Album) True-Melody 2007
- A Hundred Days In One (2 versions) Rest Assured Catskills Records 2006
- Cay's Crays (Single) (3 versions)
- Cay's Crays (One Self) Kartel Creative 2006
- Duck And Cover (CD, Album) Tug O War, Soundsystem, Jarring Effects 2006
- Ghost Forest (CD, Album) No Fridge 2006
- Temptation Jstar UK Dubs Remixes Vol. 1 (12") Jstar 2006
- Liquid Surfaces Re-Processed #1 (2 versions) Jarring Effects 2006
- Między Nami Cafe 4 (CD, Comp, Mixed, Dig) "Be Your Own" (Amp Fiddler)

Audiopharm 2005

- Nutrition Facts (CD, Album) Dramenbejsky Gig Ant 2005
- Mash Up (2 versions) "Choose To Care" (Main) Discograph 2005
- Reverse Engineering Feat. BluRum13 (LP) Jarring Effects 2005
- U.S.S.R. The Art Of Listening (Album) (2 versions) "Till Suns In Your Eyes"

Ninja Tune 2002

- U.S.S.R. Life From The Other Side (Album) (5 versions) 2002
- Bullfrog EP 2 (CD, Mini) Rope-a-Dope/Atlantic Records 2000
- It's Obvious (Single) (2 versions) Ninja Tune 1999

=== Tracks Appear On ===
- Love to Hate War (Dusty Remix) Various – Electro Swing Fever (4xCD, Comp + Box) Wagram 2010
- Stormy Minds Various – Audioactivism No. 2 (CD, Comp) Jarring Effects 2010
- Tell Me You Love It Break Beat Bass Vol 4 (CD, Mixed by Aquasky) Passenger 2008
- Soundsystem Various – Métissages Vol. 1 (CD, Comp) V2 Music France 2006
- Choose to Care Various - Scopitone Nantes/Rezé (CD, Comp, Dig) Olympic (3) 2006
- Talking Green Dope Beats Vol. 1 – Jusqu'Ici Tout Va Bien (CD, Comp, Dig) Supadope Records 2005
- Did You DJ Vadim – Stereo Pictures Vol. 03 (CD, Mixed, Promo, Album) MK2 Music 2003
- Letter Twenty Five Juice CD Volume 21 (CD, Comp) Juice Magazine 2002
- It Is MPM (Mikirov Per Minute) (Cass) 2002
- It Is Spotlight Records (3) 2002
- We Might Be You Up North Trip, (CD, Comp, Promo) Under Pressure Magazine 2002
- It's Obvious No. 20 (Cass, Comp, Mixed) Not On Label (DJ Kojak Self-released) 2000

=== Unofficial releases ===
- Def Beat Remixes Vol. 3 (2xLP, Comp, Unofficial) 2005
