= DJ Woody =

British DJ (born 1977)

- Origin: British
- Genres: Turntablism, hip hop, trip hop, breakbeat
- Occupations: DJ, turntablist, producer
- Instrument: Turntables
- Website: djwoody.tv

DJ Woody (born 1977) is a prolific DJ and turntablist born in Burnley, Lancashire UK.

== Career ==
He started DJing in 1992 but made his name through the DJ competition circuit when, in 2001, he was the first European DJ to win the ITF (International Turntablist Federation) World championship title in San Francisco. A year later he won the Vestax World title.

He is known for his innovative and musical approach to turntablism and is responsible for the invention of various scratches and techniques including his famous signature "Woodpecker Scratch".

He helped Vestax, the turntable and mixer manufacturer, in the design of its Controller One turntable, the first ever turntable to play full musical scales.

In 2002, he toured the United States with Stones Throw Records' artists Lootpack (Madlib, Wildchild & DJ Romes), Declaime, J Sands (Lone Catalist) and P Trix (US DMC Champion) and DJ Dopey (World Disco Mix Club Champion).

The following year he joined the "Russian Percussion" touring outfit with the producer DJ Vadim and the vocalists Blu Rum 13 and Yarah Bravo. This touring outfit later formed hip hop collective One Self, whose LP, Children of Possibility, was released in 2005 on Ninja Tune Records. The group was described by The Times as "best newcomers of 2005" and won Channel 4's Slashmusic Showcase.

Mixes released in this period were the UK hip hop retrospective "Bangers & Mash" and a crate-digging collaboration with Sean Canty (Demdike Stare) A Country Practice. Both received widespread acclaim in the music press.

Between 2007 and 2009, DJ Woody was the tour DJ for the Latin Grammy winner Mala Rodriguez.

In 2010, Woody launched his ground breaking audio-visual DJ show Turntables in Technicolor. Drawing on his former career as a graphic designer, he also designed and animated all the material used in the show. Notable performances of this set were at the 2010 World DMC Finals in London and 2011 US DMC finals in New York, a support slot for The Happy Mondays and a bespoke performance for the BBC's hit children's TV show The Slammer.

In 2011, Woody's video remix featuring the Hollywood star Anne Hathaway was discussed, blogged and tweeted worldwide by the likes of BBC Newbeat, Scott Mills, Tommy Lee (Mötley Crüe), NME and Glamour Magazine. Hathaway passed comment on the video at the premier of London One Day.

In 2012, he released a mixtape with the UK rapper Dr Syntax, and a DJ mix for Tokyo Dawn Records. The latter was "Mix of the Week" on both MTV and Okayplayer websites.

In 2012, his themed video DJ set "DJ Woody's Big Phat 90s" was described as "mind-blowing" by the veteran DJ and writer Billy Jam in his feature for Amoeba Records. In 2013, he started touring his audio-visual hip hop retrospective "Hip Hop is 40".

In 2015, Woody took audio-visual-turntablism to the theatre, premiering Blake Remixed at the 2015 Edinburgh Fringe and touring UK theatres. In this collaboration with the beatboxer and rapper Testament, he created a live soundtrack via the turntables while controlling interactive 3D projection-mapped characters, enabling the DJ turntables to become part of the storytelling.

In 2016, his production came to the fore. In the form of "BocaWoody", a new collaborative project with Bristol's Boca45, they released a 6 track EP and vinyl 7" in May. In October, he released his first solo LP, The Point Of Contact. The album has the musicians Christian Madden (keyboard player for Liam Gallagher), Carl Sharrocks (drummer for 808 State), Nick Blacka (Gogo Penguin) and Matthew Halsall). The live act, in which Woody usedthe turntables as a lead instrument, included drums (Sharrocks) and keyboards (Madden) and debuted at the DMC World Finals at the 02 Kentish Town Forum in London.

In May 2017, the full-length album from BocaWoody, Carousel, was released. Described as "Super feel-good funky hip hop exuburance!" by Cold Cut's Jon Moore, the single "Jump" featuring BluRum13 made the BBC Radio 6 music "Recommends" playlist.

In 2018 and 2019, Woody was the support act for Hacienda Classical for arena tours with Peter Hook, Mike Pickering, Graham Park and the Manchester Camerata Orchestra. These concluded each year with performances at the Royal Albert Hall.

== Awards ==
- 2001 Northern DMC Champion
- 2001 UK ITF Champion
- 2001 UK Vestax Champion
- 2001 World ITF Champion
- 2002 DMC UK Defending Champion
- 2002 UK Vestax Champion
- 2002 World Vestax Champion

== Appearances ==
- Krispy formally Krispy 3 – Millennium Funk (Damn Right)
- Indiginus – Homebaked LP (Kinky Star Records)
- Geist – Rage/Cut Throat 12" (Geistweb)
- DJ Vadim – Headline News 12 (Ninja Tune)
- Sirconical – Waving at Planes (Twisted Nerve)
- Evil Ed – The Enthusiast LP (Janomi)
- One Self – Be Your Own 12 (Ninja Tune)
- One Self – Blue Bird/Fear the Labour 12 (Ninja Tune)
- Gangstarr Foundation (Guru & Krumbsnatcha)- Ahead of the Game
- One Self – Children of Possibility LP (Ninja Tune)
- One Self – Paranoid 12" (Ninjatune)
- DJ Vadim – Soundcatcher LP (B.B.E)
- I-DEF-I – In The Light of a New Day (Copro)
- Dirt Diggers – The Pleasure Is All Mine (Zebra Traffic)
- DJ Grasshoppa – Intricate Moves 2 LP
- K Delight – scratch club
- DJ Vadim – Got to Rock 12" (BBE)
- Aquasky – Breakbeat Bass 4 mix CD (Passenger)
- IDA World Final track feat Ragga Twins, DJ Rafik, DJ Woody, DJ Pfel Mpran
- Seek Tha Northerner – Warning (Killamari)
- Blu Rum 13 – Inverted LP
- Aquasky – The Hip Hop EP (Passenger)
- Mala Rodriguez & The Original Jazz Orchestra – Tengo Un Trato
- Gunshot – Burn Cycle

== Releases ==
- DJ Woody – Fly Fishing (Chopped Herring Records)
- The Boogie (DJ Woody Mixtape) – Tokyo Dawn Records
- DJ Woody Vs Body Snatchers – Passenger Mixtape Vol.1 (Passenger)
- Dj Vadim & Dj Woody – Lettuce Propelled Rockets (JFR)
- DJ Woody & Sean Vinylment – A Country Practice (Woodwurk)
- Dj Vadim & Dj Woody – Lettuce Propelled Rockets (JFR)
- DJ Woody – Bangers & Mash (Woodwurk)
- DJ Woody – Flexicuts (Woodwurk)
- DJ Woody – Flexicuts 2 (Woodwurk)
- DJ Woody – Flexicuts 3 (Woodwurk)
- DJ Woody – Flexicuts 4 (Woodwurk)
- DJ Woody – Flexicuts 5 (Woodwurk)
- DJ Woody – Flexicuts 6 (Woodwurk)
- DJ Woody – Flexin Hard LP (Woodwurk)
- DJ Woody – Flexin Hard 2 LP (Woodwurk)
- DJ Woody – Ear Wax 7" (Woodwurk)
- DJ Woody – Repetitive Scratch Injury 7" (Woodwurk)
- DJ Woody – The Point Of Contact LP (Woodwurk)
- DJ Woody – The Point Of Contact Stems & Scratches 7"(Woodwurk)
- DJ Woody – Scratch Sounds No.1 LP (Woodwurk)
- DJ Woody – Scratch Sounds No.1 7" (Woodwurk)
- DJ Woody – Scratch Sounds No.2 LP (Woodwurk)
- DJ Woody – Scratch Sounds No.2 7" (Woodwurk)
- BocaWoody (DJ Woody & Boca 45) - NW/SW EP (BocaWoody Recordings)
- BocaWoody (DJ Woody & Boca 45) - Jump 7" (BocaWoody Recordings)
- BocaWoody (DJ Woody & Boca 45) - Freeze 7" (BocaWoody Recordings)
- BocaWoody (DJ Woody & Boca 45) - Carousel LP (BocaWoody Recordings)
