= The Blade =

The Blade may refer to:

== Culture ==
=== Film ===
- The Blade (film), a 1995 martial arts film by Tsui Hark

=== Music ===
- The Blade (Sol Invictus album), a 1997 album by Sol Invictus
- The Blade (Ashley Monroe album), a 2015 album by Ashley Monroe
- The Blade, a song by AURORA from her album What Happened to the Heart?

=== Other uses in culture ===
- The Blade (Toledo), a newspaper published in Toledo, Ohio
- Washington Blade, an LGBT newspaper
- The New York Blade, an LGBT newspaper

== People ==
- Mitch Daniels or the Blade, American politician
- Brian Gamble or the Blade, American professional wrestler and martial artist
- Braxton Sutter or the Blade, American professional wrestler
- Dexter Jackson (bodybuilder) or the Blade

== Other ==
- The Blade, Manchester, a skyscraper in Manchester, England
- The Blade, Reading, a high-rise in Reading, Berkshire
- The Blade, a swinging ship at Alton Towers
- A nickname for Technoblade

== See also ==
- Blade (disambiguation)
