= U.S.S.R. The Art of Listening =

Studio album by DJ Vadim
- Released: 23 September 2002
- Genre: Hip hop, electronic
- Length: 65:49
- Label: Ninja Tune
- Producer: DJ Vadim

DJ Vadim chronology
U.S.S.R. Life from the Other Side (1999)	U.S.S.R. The Art of Listening (2002)	The Soundcatcher (2007)

Singles from U.S.S.R. The Art of Listening
- 1. "Till Suns in Your Eye" Released: 2002; 2. "It's On" Released: 2002; 3. "Combustible" Released: 2002; 4. "Edie Brikell" Released: 2003

Professional ratings
Review scores
Source	Rating
BBC Music	favorable
Dusted Magazine	mixed
Exclaim!	favorable
IGN	8.5/10

U.S.S.R. The Art of Listening is a 2002 studio album by DJ Vadim, released on Ninja Tune.

== Critical reception ==
Noel Dix of Exclaim! said, "With varied MCs taking the mic, Vadim is allowed to switch up his beats to accommodate their flows and the end result is quite stunning at times."

Will Sansom of BBC Music described it as "a composition of the world's more diverse and eclectic sounds, resulting in a musical canvas that stretches the imagination." Noah Zimmerman of Dusted Magazine said, "It sounds like a combination between another Ninja Tune compilation and your buddy's mixtape, with much better production value."

== Track listing ==
No.	Title	Length
1.	"Till Suns in Your Eye" (featuring Motion Man)	4:35
2.	"It's On" (featuring Vakill)	3:48
3.	"She Who Is Tested" (featuring Yarah Bravo)	3:34
4.	"Combustible" (featuring Gift of Gab)	3:15
5.	"Ghetto Rebels" (featuring Phi Life Cypher)	5:36
6.	"Revelations Well Expounded" (featuring Kela and Ulzula Dudziak)	4:43
7.	"The Harp Song Part 2"	3:12
8.	"The Pacifist" (featuring Yarah Bravo)	4:48
9.	"In Control Vol. 3" (featuring DJ Plus One)	1:52
10.	"Taa Fun Aiye" (featuring Ade Soma and G Ruff)	6:03
11.	"Who Me" (featuring Demolition Man)	4:20
12.	"Something to Feel?" (featuring Task Force and Mr Thing)	4:45
13.	"L'Art D'Ecouter" (featuring TTC)	5:00
14.	"That Which Is Coming" (featuring Revd Clevie Brown)	6:25
15.	"Edie Brikell" (featuring Slug)	3:35
