= SFX Hall =

Theatre in Dublin, Ireland

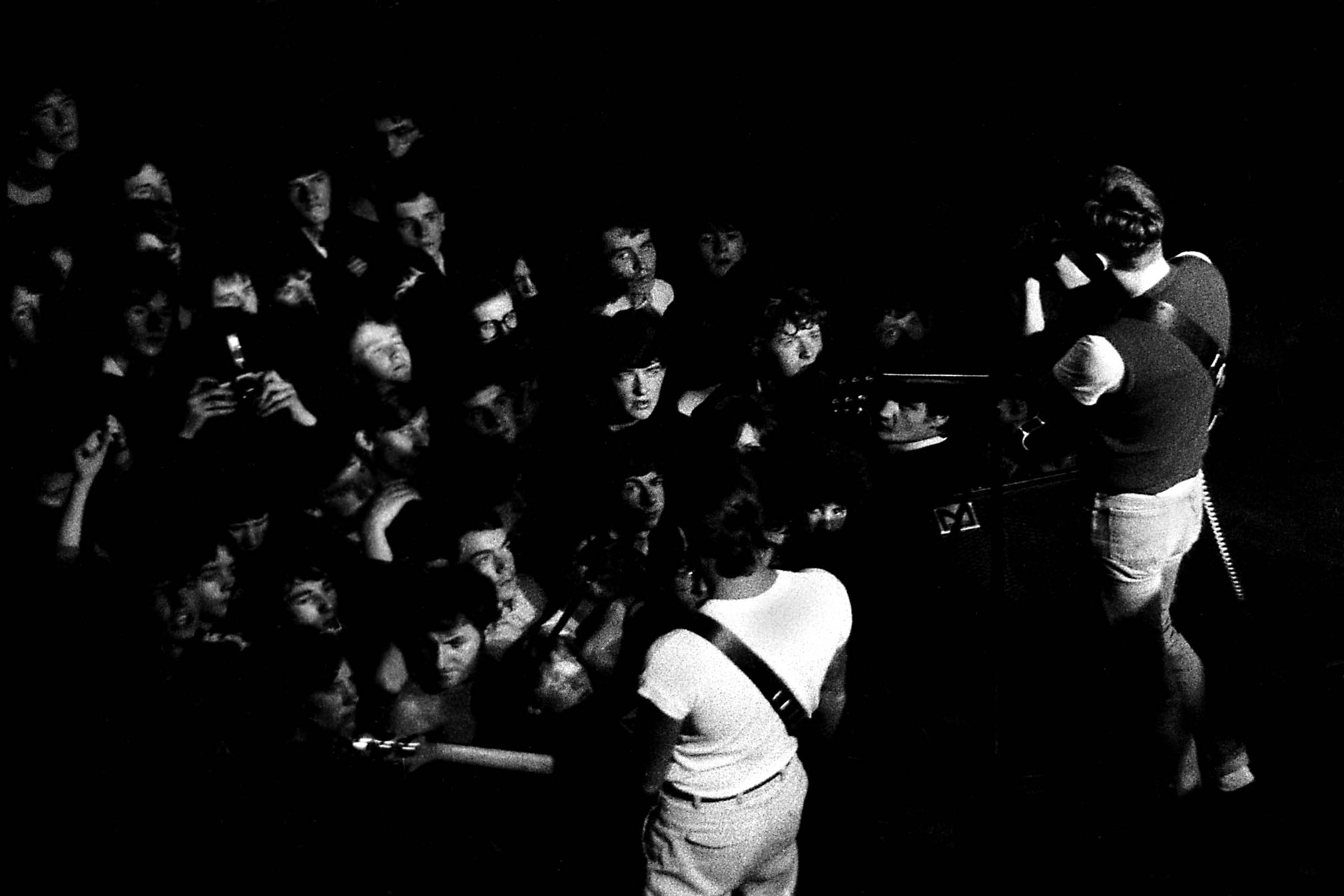
New Order at SFX Dublin in 1983

SFX Hall, sometimes referred to as SFX Theatre or The SFX, was a theatre located on Sherrard Street Upper, in Dublin, Ireland.

== History ==
The venue was named after the St Francis Xavier Hall and constructed in 1957, although a theatre had been located on that site since the middle of the 19th century. The theatre served as the national concert hall, a home to the RTÉ Symphony Orchestra, and on occasion, large-scale performances. The venue had a standing capacity of 1000 and hosted theater, pop and rock music concerts until 2005 when the shows were moved to the Ambassador Theatre.

From the late 1970s through 2001, the hall became renowned for rock and pop concerts. Acts ranged from U2, who played three nights there in December 1982 in support of their album War, to the Pogues, whose 1985 performance was later fondly recalled as “magical nights” in a retrospective on the venue.The SFX was well loved by rock fans who flocked to see bands like FooFighters, Metallica, Smashing Pumpkins, Red Hot Chili Peppers.

The Dublin Theatre Festival was also housed at the SFX, catering to international theater companies showcasing work.

In 2006, SFX Theater was demolished to make way for 41 apartments. It was a sad loss to the Dublin music scene.

== Performances ==
Acts that played the SFX include:

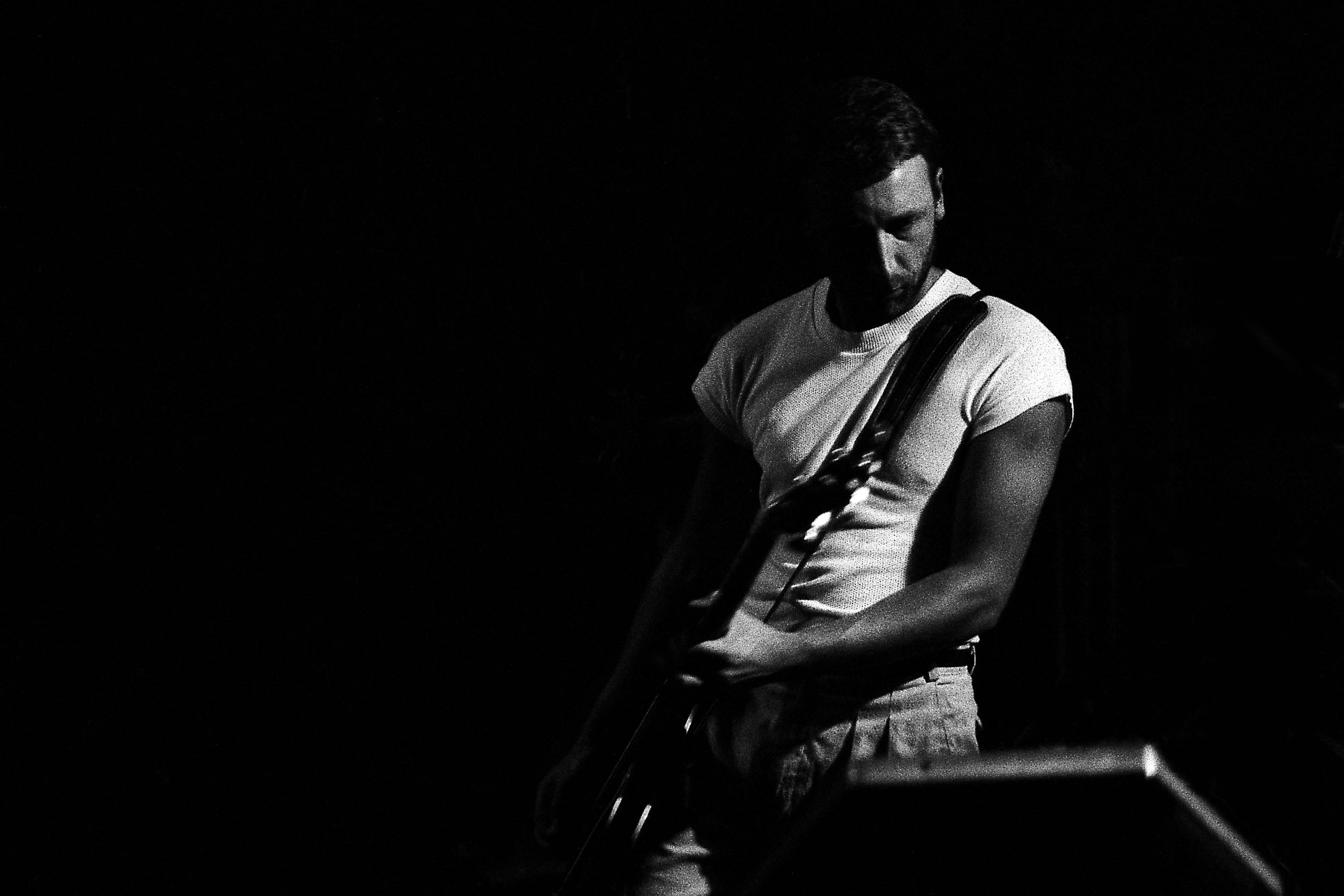
New Order in SFX Hall, 1983

- ABC
- Alanis Morissette
- Alice in Chains
- An Emotional Fish
- Anthrax
- Ash
- Big Audio Dynamite
- Billy Bragg
- Björk
- The Black Crowes
- The Blades
- Buffalo Tom
- Bush
- Chumbawamba
- The Clash
- Cocteau Twins
- Counting Crows
- The Damned
- Def Leppard
- Deftones
- Depeche Mode
- Dio
- Dokken
- Echo and the Bunnymen
- EMF
- Fear Factory
- Foo Fighters
- Fugazi
- Grand Slam
- Green Day
- Iron Maiden
- James
- The Jesus and Mary Chain
- Jesus Jones
- Joan Jett and the Blackhearts
- Judas Priest
- Kerbdog
- Korn
- Madness
- Marillion
- Megadeth
- Meat Loaf
- Metallica
- Moby
- My Bloody Valentine
- New Order
- Nick Cave and the Bad Seeds
- Nine Inch Nails
- The Offspring
- Ozzy Osbourne
- Pantera
- Phish
- Placebo
- The Pogues
- Portishead
- Pulp
- The Pretenders
- Queensrÿche
- Ratt
- R.E.M.
- Red Hot Chili Peppers
- Rollins Band
- Rory Gallagher
- Saxon
- Sepultura
- Silverfish
- Simple Minds
- Sinéad O'Connor
- Siouxsie and the Banshees
- Slayer
- The Smashing Pumpkins
- The Smiths
- Spin Doctors
- Stone Temple Pilots
- Suede
- The Sugarcubes
- Therapy?
- Thin Lizzy
- Tool
- Type O Negative
- U2
- Ultravox
- The Verve
- Virgin Prunes
- W.A.S.P.
- The Waterboys
- The Wedding Present
- Whipping Boy
- Whitesnake
- The Wonder Stuff
- ZZ Top
