= Mark B =

- Birth name: Mark Barnes
- Born: 1970; Kingston upon Thames, United Kingdom
- Died: 1 January 2016 (aged 45–46)
- Genres: Hip hop
- Occupation(s): DJ, producer, rapper
- Instruments: Vocals
- Years active: 1995–2016
- Labels: Underworld Connection; Disc-Located Beats & Sounds - Volume 1; New Mic Order; Mark B Presents Delta (6) – The Lostralian

Mark Barnes (1970 – 1 January 2016), known professionally as Mark B, was a British hip hop record producer.

He was most active in the 1990s and early 2000s, associating with Blade and Task Force on many of his records. He was a DJ for Jazz Fudge Recordings for much of his career.

Mark B first signed with Jazz Fudge in 1995. He produced some tracks for DJ Vadim's U.S.S.R. Repertoire. His first individual album was Underworld Connection, released in 1997. He died in January 2016.

== Discography ==
- Any More Questions? (1995)
- Underworld Connection (1997)
- Disco-Loated Beats & Sounds, Vol. 1 (1997)
- New Skool Dean (1998)
- Hitmen for Hire (Mark B & Blade) (1998)
- Nobody Relates (Mark B & Blade) (1998)
- Split Personalities/From the World Lab (Mark B & Blade) (2000)
- The Unknown (Mark B & Blade) (2000)
- The Unknown: The New Version (Mark B & Blade) (2001)
- "0161 Relief" (Mark B remix) (2001)
- "Big Tings" (Mark B remix) (2001)
