= Stephen Simpson (musician) =

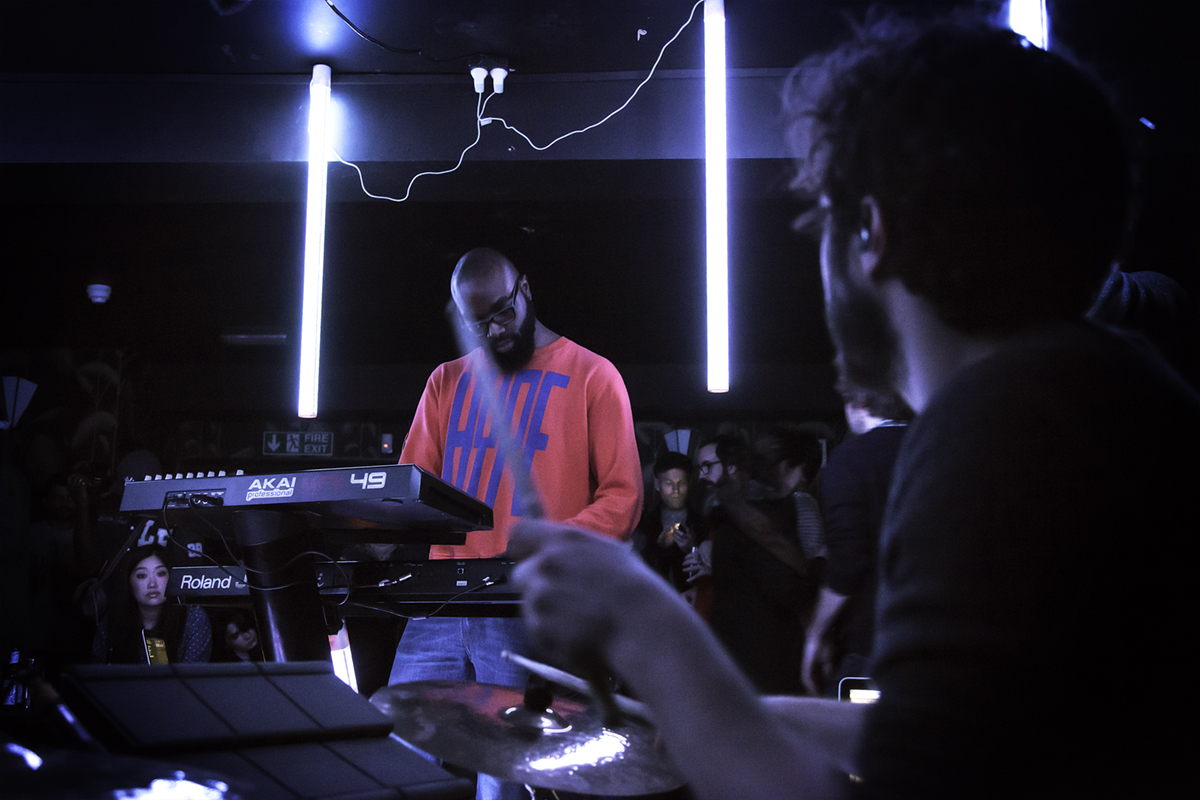
- Ste Simpson performing with Robinn in 2015 at the Slaughtered Lamb music venue in Clerkenwell, London.

Background information
- Also known as: (silence) MYƎGO
- Born: Stephen Simpson; Huddersfield
- Origin: United Kingdom
- Genres: Electronica, hip-hop, house
- Occupations: Session musician, producer, dj
- Instruments: Keyboards, Bass Guitar
- Years active: 2004 – present
- Formerly of: The Electric
- Website: silencemy3go.earth

Stephen Simpson Professionally known as (silence) MYƎGO is a musician, beat-maker, producer and dj, born in Huddersfield, UK, his music incorporates elements of hip hop, soul, reggae and electronica.

== Career ==
In 2004 Simpson began his career as a keyboardist with the grammy-nominated artist Estelle, joining her on her 2005 European tour supporting John Legend. Moving to London in the summer of 2007 Simpson began working closely with Russian producer DJ Vadim with whom he formed a production duo "Butterfish Black" and a band "The Electric". After leaving the band in the winter of 2011, Simpson went on to work closely with numerous musical artists including Chipmunk, Liam Bailey, Robinn, Altrego, Natural Self and Hawkhouse before teaming up with Chesca Royalty in 2017 to work on several tracks on her "System Olympia" project.

== Style ==
Simpson's music fuses genres to create a digital-analog hybrid sound using various vintage synthesizers, drum machines and acoustic instruments to create dreamy textures.

== Discography ==
=== Alice Russell ===
- "Living the Life of a Dreamer" remix (Little Poppet, May 2009)
- "Got the Hunger" remix (Little Poppet, May 2009)

=== Anti-Social (OST) ===
- "Looking Back" w/Shara Nelson (RST Pictures, May 2015)
- "Matola" w/Rodney P. (RST Pictures, May 2015)

=== DJ Vadim ===
- "Hidden Treasure/Saturday/Soldier" 12"/Digital download (BBE, April 2009)
- U Can't Lurn Imaginashun LP (BBE, May 2009)
- "That Lite" remix 12" (BBE, July 2009)

=== The Electric ===
- Life is Moving – Instrumentals LP (BBE, June 2013)
- Life is Moving LP (O.G.S. Organically Grown Sounds, April 2011)
- Toot Toot 12" (O.G.S. Organically Grown Sounds, March 2011)
- You are Diamonds 12" (Jakarta, November 2010)
- Beautiful w/Yarah Bravo 12" (O.G.S. Organically Grown Sounds, September 2010)

=== I Blame Coco ===
- "Summer Rain" 12" (Island Records Group, November 2010)
- "No Smile" 12" (Island Records Group, November 2010)
- "Never Be" (Unreleased, November 2010)

=== Mr Day ===
- "If I Can't Love You" remix 7" (Favorite Recordings, May 2009)

=== System Olympia ===
- Dusk & Dreamland LP (Slow Motion Recordings, Jan 2017)
- Rising/Setting EP (Slow Motion Recordings, Jan 2017)
- "8" 7" (Slow Motion Recordings, Jan 2017)
- "Your Not Talking" 7" (Slow Motion Recordings, Jan 2017)

=== Wax Taylor ===
- We Be/There is Danger EP (Atmosphériques, May 2008)
