= The Electric =

The Electric may refer to:

- Electric Slide, a four wall line dance
- The Electric, Birmingham, the oldest running cinema in the UK
- The Electric Blues Company, a backing band for former Animals keyboardist Alan Price
- The Electric (band)
