= U.S.S.R. Life from the Other Side =

Studio album by DJ Vadim
- Released: 14 September 1999
- Genre: Hip-hop
- Length: 72:04
- Label: Ninja Tune
- Producer: DJ Vadim

DJ Vadim chronology
U.S.S.R. Repertoire (1996)	U.S.S.R. Life from the Other Side (1999)	U.S.S.R. The Art of Listening (2002)

Professional ratings
Review scores
Source	Rating
AllMusic	4.5/5 stars
CMJ New Music Report	favorable
The Stranger	favorable

U.S.S.R. Life from the Other Side is a 1999 studio album by DJ Vadim, released on Ninja Tune.

== Critical reception ==
John Bush of AllMusic gave the album 4.5 stars out of 5, saying, "Since he's working with rappers on more than half of the tracks here, Vadim transforms himself from a solo turntablist into a genuine rap trackmaster with catchier riffs and tighter beats than most in Britain's instrumental hip-hop underground." Ron Hart of CMJ New Music Report said, "Vadim has established himself as one of the most creative beatminers on the European circuit."

== Track listing ==
No.	Title	Length
1.	"Getting Friendly"	0:42
2.	"Viagra" (featuring El-P, BMS, and DJ Primecuts)	2:58
3.	"My Favourite Letter"	1:11
4.	"Life from the Itchy Side" (featuring Skinny Man)	3:28
5.	"English Breakfast" (featuring Swollen Members)	3:41
6.	"Building Tension in 2 Dimensions"	4:01
7.	"Dig Yourself Baby!"	1:13
8.	"Are You Sure"	1:27
9.	"The Pact (Super Rimes)" (featuring Starvin' Artists)	4:39
10.	"Outerschmoodles"	0:29
11.	"Your Revolution" (featuring Sarah Jones)	4:11
12.	"It's Obvious" (featuring Blu Rum 13)	5:05
13.	"The Piano Song"	2:45
14.	"Pauses for Repetition"	0:42
15.	"Truly & Really" (featuring Toastie Taylor)	3:47
16.	"Ponmelo Duro" (featuring Mucho Mu)	3:18
17.	"The Terrorist" (featuring Motion Man)	4:51
18.	"The Larry Chatsworth Theme"	0:50
19.	"From Russia with Love" (featuring Blade)	4:16
20.	"Shikko: The Affirmers of the New Art"	3:31
21.	"Micro Course in Russian"	1:48
22.	"Friction" (featuring Iriscience and DJ Primecuts)	4:15
23.	"A 110 DSP: Acquiring the Taste"	0:42
24.	"How to Exercise the Turntable Record Player" (featuring Mr. Thing and First Rate)	7:50
25.	"Strength & Understanding for Young Lovers"	1:51
