= Sherrard Street, Dublin =

Street in Dublin, Ireland

Sherrard Street
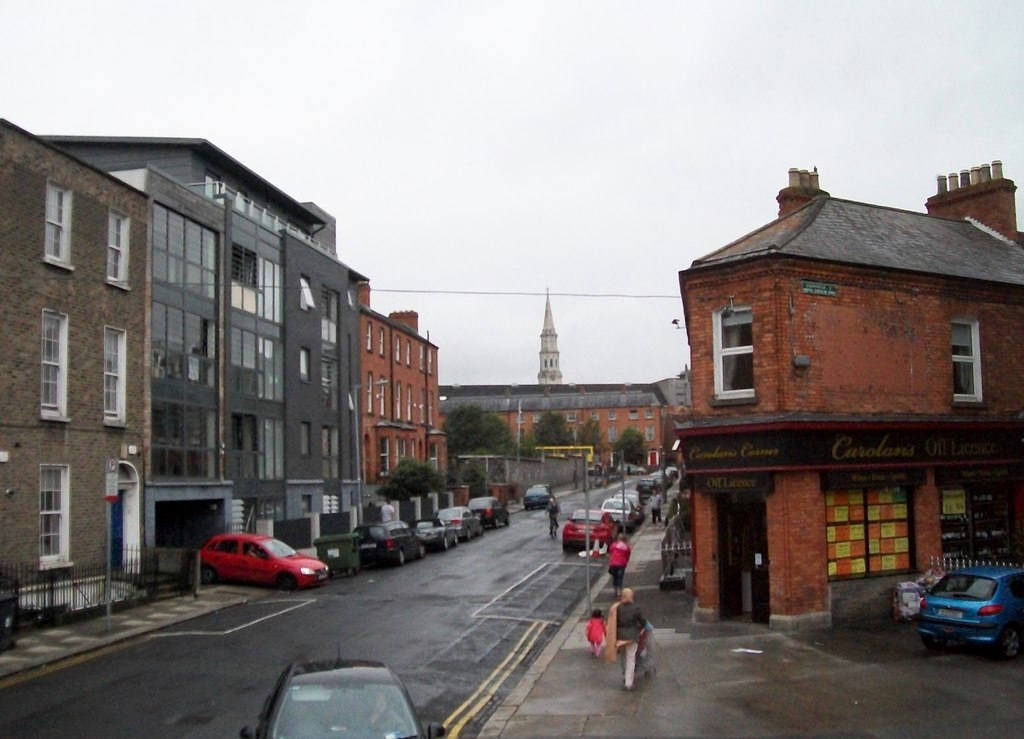
- Sherrard Street Upper looking towards Gardiner Street
- Interactive map of Sherrard Street
- Native name: Sráid Sherrard (Irish)
- Postal code: D01
- Coordinates: 53.3589°N 6.25965°W
- west end: Gardiner Street
- Major junctions: North Circular Road
- north end: Portland Place

Construction
- Construction start: 1828

Sherrard Street (Irish: Sráid Sherrard) is a street on the northside of Dublin, Ireland. The street is divided in to Sherrard Street Lower running from Portland Place to the North Circular Road, and Sherrard Street Upper running from the North Circular Road to Gardiner Street by a dog-leg corner.

== History ==
Sherrard Street is named for Thomas Sherrard, surveyor and secretary to the Wide Streets Commission. He was one of a number of his family involved in this work as surveyors, clerks, and drawing up maps. The street was formally laid out in 1828.

The street was developed from the early 1800s onwards, with many of the houses on Sherrard Street Lower dating from around that date with terraces which contain Greek Revival ornamentation which all conform to strict guidelines on plot ratios and parapet heights. In the 1860s, the street was home to many professionals and merchants. Sherrard Street Upper was mostly developed later, with red brick terraced houses dating from the 1880s, with an early Victorian row surviving. The end of the street connecting with Gardiner Street contains the side gardens of the Jesuit community at Saint Francis Xavier Church.

Rawlton House on Sherrard Street Lower dates from 1899 and was built as a boys school. It is a symmetrical, four-bay, Victorian parish school designed by William Mansfield Mitchell, and replaced earlier schools on Portland Street and on the grounds of St George's Church locally. It was later converted for light industrial use. The building was subject to arson in January 2023 when disinformation spread on social media that the school was to be redeveloped as housing for refugees or international protection applicants.

The former music venue, the SFX Hall, stood on Sherrard Street Upper. Built it 1957, replacing an earlier theatre, the venue acted as the national concert hall, a home to the RTÉ Symphony Orchestra and music venue. It was demolished in 2006.

In the 2020s, the street has become known as an illegal dumping black spot, exasperated by the use of bags for rubbish collection which are attacked by animals.

=== Notable residents ===
- Rev. James Wills, poet and father of William Gorman Wills, lived at number 3 Sherrard Street Lower.
