= James Wills (poet) =

Irish poet (1790–1868)

Rev. James Wills (1 January 1790 – 23 November 1868) was an Irish writer, poet, and Anglican clergyman.

== Early life and education ==
Wills was born in County Roscommon, the younger son of landowner Thomas Wills of Willsgrove, and his second wife, a daughter of Capt. James Browne of Moyne, County Roscommon. The Wills family were landed gentry in Roscommon. His grandfather Col. Godfrey Wills was an amateur architect.

His father died when he was 2 and was succeeded by his eldest son from his first marriage, William Robert Wills, who married Mary Grey Sanford, the niece and co-heiress of Henry Sandford, 1st Baron Mount Sandford of Castlerea House. He assumed the name and arms of Sandford in 1847.

James was educated at Trinity College, Dublin, and studied law in the Middle Temple, London but was forced to abandon his legal career after his mentally unstable brother Thomas (born 1788) squandered his inheritance. In 1829, Thomas Wills, after being discharged from a mental asylum, sold the remainder of the estate for £30,000 (equivalent to £2,848,000 in 2025). He sailed for America but disappeared, and his family suspected he was murdered by his valet.

James' older half-brother, now known as William Robert Wills, offered him the family estate of Willsgrove, but he declined because of the ongoing costs, and instead entered the church.

== Career ==
From 1822 to 1838, Wills lived in Dublin, at number 3 Sherrard Street Lower, and wrote in the Dublin University Magazine, Blackwood's Magazine and other periodicals. He supported the Reverend Caesar Otway in building up the Irish Quarterly Review.

In 1831, he published The Disembodied and other Poems. The Philosophy of Unbelief (1835) attracted much attention. He actually wrote the famous poem "The Universe", even though it was published in 1821 under the name of Charles Maturin. He was editor of the Dublin University Magazine in 1841 and 1842.

His largest work was Lives of Illustrious and Distinguished Irishmen, published in six volumes (1840–1847), and his last publication The Idolatress (1868). In all his writings gave evidence of a powerful personality. His poems are spirited, and in some cases show considerable dramatic qualities.

In 1841, Wills was appointed curate of Pollrone, County Kilkenny, and became the vicar five years later. In 1848, he years later he was promoted to the living of Kilmacow, and in 1861 ultimately to Attanagh.

He was appointed Donnellan lecturer at Trinity College Dublin in 1855–56. In 1860, he gave a series of lectures on Christianity at TCD, where he "delighted the students" with his delivery.

== Family ==
In 1822, Wills married Katherine Gorman, daughter of the Rev. W. Gorman and niece of the chief justice Charles Kendal Bushe. They had three sons and a daughter, Elizabeth. His middle son was the dramatist and painter William Gorman Wills. His other two sons entered the church: The eldest, Rev. Thomas Bushe Wills, was curate of Attanagh under his father and the youngest, the Rev. Freeman Crofts Wills (1837–1913), was vicar of St Agatha's.

He died in Attanagh, County Laois.
