= Brian Oakes =

American sculptor

Brian Oakes (born 1995) is an American interdisciplinary sculptor. They are nonbinary and live in Brooklyn, New York.

== Career and work ==
Brian Oakes graduated from the Rhode Island School of Design with a BFA degree in sculpture, and a concentration in computation in 2018.

Oakes is known for making chandelier-like light fixtures, which hang from ceilings and also function as art objects, playing back snippets of audio. They are also notable for making sculptures enabled by digital fabrication processes, such as using Printed Circuit Boards and CNC.

They have exhibited their artwork at Mery Gates Gallery, Blade Study, Dunkunsthalle, Someday Gallery, Bellow Grand, Space 369, and Nightjar Studios.

Their 2024 solo show at Blade Study in New York City, Seed, focused on dioramas and display cases housing non-functional machines and miniature electronics. Writing about Seed, critic Theo Belci wrote that Oakes "hints at the vast conceptual webs undergirding modern economic networks, emphasizing what might lie beyond (or beneath) the easily apprehended manifestations of our digital caves."
