= Blade (surname) =

Blade is a surname. Notable people with the surname include:

- Brady Blade (born 1965), American drummer, record producer, and composer
- Brian Blade (born 1970), American drummer, composer, and singer-songwriter
- Caolin Blade (born 1994), Irish rugby player
- Mary Blade (1913–1994), American engineer
- Richard Blade (born 1952), British-American radio, television, and film personality
- Stanford Blade, Canadian agronomist and academic administrator
