= Blades (film) =

1989 American horror comedy film

- Theatrical release poster
- Directed by: Thomas R. Rondinella
- Screenplay by: William R. Pace; Thomas R. Rondinella
- Story by: John P. Finegan
- Produced by: John P. Finegan; William R. Pace
- Starring: Robert North; Victoria Scott; Jeremy Whelan; Larry Stromberg; Kara Callahan; David Aldrich; James P. Mann
- Cinematography: James Hayman
- Edited by: Thomas R. Rondinella
- Music by: John Hodian
- Distributed by: Troma Entertainment
- Release date: 1989
- Running time: 98 minutes
- Country: United States
- Language: English
- Budget: $650,000

Blades is a 1989 American horror comedy film distributed by Troma Entertainment and directed and edited by Thomas R. Rondinella, who also co-wrote the film with producers William R. Pace and John P. Finegan. Its plot concerns a series of brutal murders occurring at a prestigious country club's golf course, which are apparently the work of a possessed lawn mower.

== Plot ==
During a camping trip, two teenagers are killed by an unseen force whilst making out in a field near to the Tall Grass Country Club's famed golf course, and their mangled bodies are discovered the next morning. Later that day, another club member, Mr. Simpkins, is also killed, and his bloodied remains are found near the same hole as the one where the teenager's bodies were discovered. Norman Osgood, the owner of Tall Grass, is determined to keep the news of the murders private as he and the rest of the club prepares for an upcoming nationally televised golf tournament. Police chief Charlie Kimmel is brought in to investigate the murders.

Meanwhile, Tall Grass's newest professional, former celebrity golf player Roy Kent, decides to instigate his own investigations, and discovers a number of clues, including oil stains, paths of mowed grass, and a busted golf ball found near Simpkins's body. After a young caddy becomes the latest victim, a meeting is held, and Kimmel declares the necessity of a "course-wide maniac hunt" for the killer, in which the whole club gets involved. Chaos quickly erupts throughout the golf course, and the club members unanimously accuse former clubmember Deke Slade of being the killer after they find him on the course trying to start up a lawnmower.

During a police interrogation, Deke claims that a larger lawnmower is attacking people all by itself, and that he has been trying to track it down and stop it, but he is dismissed as being insane and gets locked up in the police station. Norman, convinced that Deke was the killer, decides to proceed with the upcoming tournament. Roy is skeptical, however, and later that night, he and assistant professional Kelly Lange sneak into the club and cut open the bag of the lawnmower Deke was using, and discover that it contains grass and no body parts, implying that the real killer is still out there.

On the day of the tournament, Roy and Kelly secretly hire a number of spotters to survey the course and ensure that the players remain safe. Right as the game ends, the course is invaded by a sentient lawnmower, which brutally kills golfer Squire Evans and terrorises the locals. Now knowing that Deke was telling the truth, Roy gets Norman to release him from prison before meeting up with Deke at an old metalworks factory. Roy offers Deke $20,000 if he agrees to help him and Kelly deal with the lawnmower, and he accepts.

Roy, Kelly and Deke devise a plan involving them tossing balloons attached to hay bales from a van to bait the lawnmower into attacking. That night, Deke reveals that the lawnmower was once owned by his father, a former greenskeeper of Tall Grass who was decapitated by the mower in an apparent suicide the day after he was fired. The next morning, the mower attacks, and Roy accidentally crashes the van in the ensuing chaos. Unable to repair the engine, Kelly devises a plan to disable the mower by pouring sugar into the gas tank, and Deke offers to be the one to lure the mower to the van. The plan fails, however, and Deke is killed. Roy manages to toss an explosive device onto the mower, however, and successfully putts a golf ball onto it, causing the mower to catch fire and explode.

== Cast ==
- Robert North as Roy Kent
- Victoria Scott as Kelly Lange
- Jeremy Whelan as Deke Slade
- Charlie Quinn as Charlie Kimmel
- William Towner as Norman Osgood
- Holly Stevenson as Beatrice "Bea" Osgood
- Bill Kimble as Sonny Fagan
- Lee Devin as Squire Evans
- Hank Berkheimer as Malcolm Simpkins

== Production ==
Rondinella stated during an interview that the idea for Blades came about during the production of Girls School Screamers (another film which he, Finegan and Pace worked on together) when Finegan "mentioned it as a future project". Having expressed interest in working on it, Rondinella and Pace were hired by Finegan to write the script, which they did so in nine days.

The film was shot over the course of eight weeks in Villas, New Jersey. Rondinella has described the film as being an intentional parody of Jaws.

== Release ==
=== Home media ===
On 27 January 2004, the film was released on DVD for the first time as a triple feature with two other Troma titles, Blood Hook and Zombie Island Massacre.

In October 2021, Vinegar Syndrome released the film on Blu-ray for the first time. This release contains newly-commissioned bonus features, including a commentary track with Rondinella and Pace and a making-of documentary featuring interviews with Rondinella, Pace and producer Finegan.
