= Stanford Blade =

Canadian agronomist and academic administrator

- Born: Wetaskiwin, Alberta, Canada
- Education: University of Alberta BSc, University of Saskatchewan MSc, McGill University PhD
- Occupations: Dean, professor, author, public speaker
- Website: ales.ualberta.ca

Stanford Blade is a Canadian agronomist and academic administrator. He is the dean of the faculty of Agricultural, Life and Environmental Sciences (ALES) at the University of Alberta. Blade is a fellow of the Royal Swedish Academy of Agriculture and Forestry.

== Awards and honors ==
In 2012, Blade was named one of Alberta's 50 most influential people by Alberta Venture magazine. In 2018, Blade was elected as an International Fellow of the Royal Swedish Academy of Agriculture and Forestry.
