= Blade Study =

Art gallery in New York City

- Established: 2020; 6 years ago
- Location: 17 Pike St, New York City
- Coordinates: 40°42′49″N 73°59′32″W
- Type: Art gallery
- Directors: Brooke Nicholas & Ian Glover
- Website: www.bladestudy.com

Blade Study is a contemporary art gallery located on the Lower East Side of Manhattan in New York City, founded in 2020.

== History ==
Founded in 2020, Blade Study is located at 17 Pike Street. In 2024, Blade Study received the Gramercy International Prize, which awards a young New York gallery a complimentary booth at The Armory Show. At The Armory Show 2024, Blade Study exhibited a solo presentation by Paige K. B. At the 2024 NADA New York art fair, Blade Study presented a solo booth by Emma Safir.

Brooke Nicholas and Ian Glover are Blade Study’s directors and founders.

=== Notable exhibitions ===
- jiwoong - Tread Water 2025
- Andrew Woolbright - Baldanders 2025
- Jo Shane - Lilies Into the Void 2025
- Pap Souleye Fall, 2024
- Brian Oakes, "SEED" 2024
- Paige K. B., The Armory Show 2024
- Emma Safir, NADA 2024
- Paige K.B., “Of Course, You Realize, This Means War” 2023
