= The Soundcatcher =

Studio album by DJ Vadim
- Released: 3 April 2007
- Genre: Hip hop, electronic
- Length: 61:26
- Label: BBE
- Producer: DJ Vadim

DJ Vadim chronology
| U.S.S.R. The Art of Listening (2002) | The Soundcatcher (2007) | U Can't Lurn Imaginashun (2009) |

Professional ratings
Review scores
| Source | Rating |
|---|---|
| AllMusic | 4/5 stars |
| CMJ New Music Monthly | favorable |
| RapReviews.com | 8/10 |
| Resident Advisor | 3.5/5 |

The Soundcatcher is a 2007 studio album by DJ Vadim, released on BBE.

== Critical reception ==
John Bush of AllMusic gave the album 4 stars out of 5, saying, "Moved to BBE, which is a natural fit even compared to his old label Ninja Tune, Vadim keeps a few things the same -- he still shows himself as one of the brightest and best producers in electronica." Daniel Bates of Resident Advisor gave the album a 3.5 out of 5 and said, "Many of the 17 tracks have dreamy, precise and inventive rhythms and snatches of speech, making the album sound like you're tuning between (tasteful) radio stations."

== Track listing ==
| No. | Title | Length |
|---|---|---|
| 1. | "Intro" | 0:24 |
| 2. | "Fear Feats" (featuring Emo and Syrus) | 5:05 |
| 3. | "Talk to Me" (featuring Sena) | 5:51 |
| 4. | "Them Say" (featuring Diane) | 3:30 |
| 5. | "Soundcatchers" (featuring Abstract Rude) | 2:49 |
| 6. | "Manchester" | 3:13 |
| 7. | "Kill Kill Kill" (featuring Big Red and Kathrin DeBoer) | 5:23 |
| 8. | "Milwaukee" | 4:13 |
| 9. | "Like the Wind" (featuring Deuce Eclipse) | 4:51 |
| 10. | "Black Is the Night" (featuring Kathrin DeBoer) | 4:19 |
| 11. | "Got to Rock" (featuring Zion) | 3:52 |
| 12. | "Theme to Big Willy Dee" | 4:22 |
| 13. | "Ballistic Affairs" (featuring Skinny Man, Singa Blinga, and Killa Kela) | 4:10 |
| 14. | "Sufferin' Blues" (featuring Lil Green) | 4:26 |
| 15. | "Bath in Bleach" (featuring Monte Smith) | 4:12 |
| 16. | "SD4" | 3:37 |
| 17. | "Watch That Sound" (featuring Emo) | 5:01 |
