= DJ Vadim =

Russian-English DJ and record producer

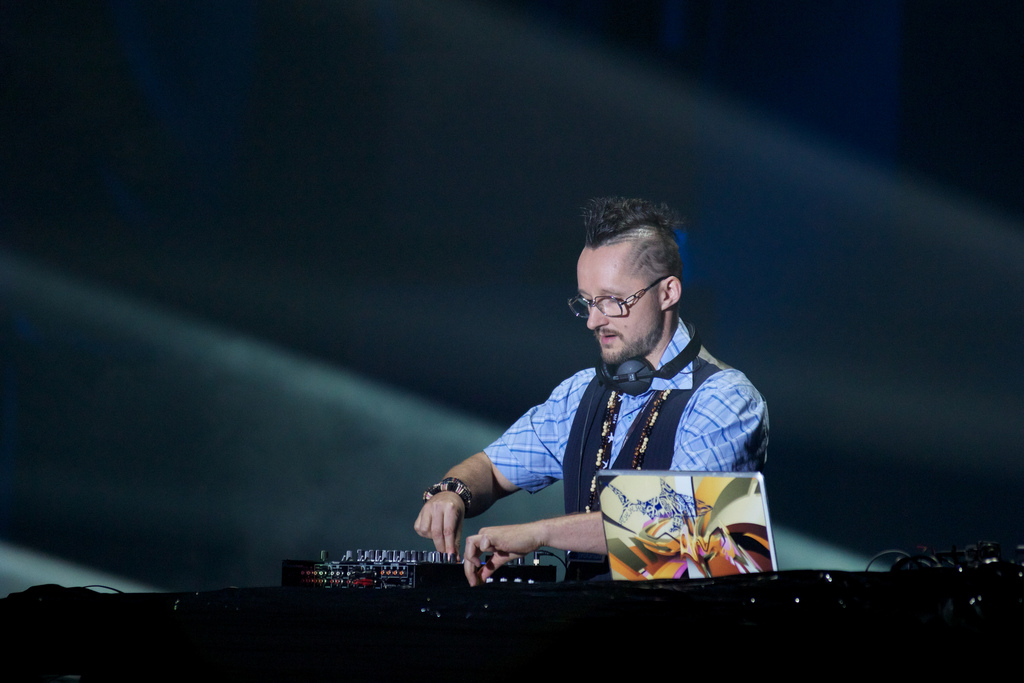
- DJ Vadim performing live in 2012.

Background information
- Also known as: Daddy Vad
- Born: 28 November 1970 (age 55); Leningrad, Russian SFSR, USSR
- Origin: London, England
- Genres: Alternative hip-hop; trip hop
- Occupations: DJ; record producer
- Years active: 1995–present
- Labels: BBE; Ninja Tune; Jazz Fudge; OGS; Soulbeats
- Website: djvadim.com

Vadim Alexandrovich Peare (Russian: Вадим Александрович Пир, romanized: Vadim Aleksandrovich Pir) (born 28 November 1970), known professionally as DJ Vadim, is a Russian-English DJ and record producer. Born in Saint Petersburg and raised in London, Peare is additionally a promoter, record collector, radio presenter, occasional painter and writer, whose music combines hip-hop, soul, reggae and electronica. He previously ran Jazz Fudge.

Peare's music combines hip-hop, soul, reggae, and electronica. He has been described as "one of the few artists creating genuinely new work in the hip-hop field" and an artist who "cannot be ignored".

== Career ==
In 1994, Vadim founded his own independent record label, Jazz Fudge, but signed to Ninja Tune the following year, before his current label BBE, in 2007. Aside from DJing and producing, he has also worked as in A&R and promotion, as well as a radio presenter on the BBC's Around the World in Eight Relays programme.

Throughout his career, he has worked with a variety of musicians, singers and groups, including DJ Krush, Stevie Wonder, The Roots, Prince, Public Enemy, Dilated Peoples, Kraftwerk, Sly and the family stone, Fat Freddys Drop, Super Furry Animals, and Paul Weller. He is also known for having worked with a number of unsigned artists who later went on to find commercial success. He is well known across the UK Hip Hop community, having worked with artists all over the UK, such as Skinnyman, Eastborn, Killa Kela and many others.

In addition to his regular album releases, he has also recorded under the names "Andre Gurov" and "Little Aida" and has appeared as a member of the various artists project The Isolationist. He is also the DJ and producer for Spanish hip-hop group 7 Notas 7 Colores, and, in 2001, was nominated alongside them at the Latin Grammy Awards.

His album, U.S.S.R. Life from the Other Side, featured Scratch Perverts, Iriscience (from Dilated Peoples), and Blade. To promote the record, Vadim put together a live group - The Russian Percussion - consisting of Mr Thing (turntables), Killa Kela (beat box), Blu Rum 13 (MC), John Ellis (keyboards). The tour consisted of 200 live shows taking in twenty four countries throughout Europe and North America.

He is the founder member of the hip-hop group One Self. Their album, Children of Possibility, was released on Ninja Tune Records in 2005. U Can't Lurn Imaginashun was his return on BBE records in May 2009 that featured the single "Soldier" by Big Red (MC). To promote the record, Vadim put a live group together consisting of Sabira Jade (singer), Ste Keyz (Keyboardist), Pugs Atomz (MC). They would later become a group called The Electric and put out an album called Life is Moving on Vadim's on imprint Organically Grown Sounds (OGS) in 2010. His album, Don't Be Scared (BBE, 2012) was praised for the "inventiveness of the beats" (incorporating dubstep, breaks, bhangra, Afrobeat and vintage house) by Q reviewer Paul McGee who rated it 4/5 and tagged "The One to Buy!"

He has made many remixes from The Cure, Erykah Badu, Alice Russell, Paul Weller, Prince, and CL Smooth.

In 2020, Vadim was interviewed by the Data.Wave webzine.

== Style ==
DJ Vadim composes both music for MCs, singers and poets and soulful instrumental hip-hop beats. In both cases, certain stylistic trends emerge;

- Dominating rhythmic percussion, heavy use of drum programming which are sometimes broken or stuttering, heavy bass and synthesizer use.
- Organic, soulful touches often using studio musicians, with undertones of roots reggae and ragga and driving, hip-hop drum orchestration.
- Original sounding compositions, arrangements that fuse many genres from hip-hop and electronica to soul and reggae.
- Heavy use of ethnic sounds, including Asian, South American and African.

"Anyone recalling Sly & Robbie's mid-80s exercises in electro-dub fusion might see DJ Vadim's latest as almost an update of that aesthetic," Paul McGee wrote in Q, reviewing Don't Be Scared LP (2012).

== Discography ==
=== DJ Vadim ===
Studio albums

- U.S.S.R. Repertoire (Ninja Tune, 1996)
- U.S.S.R. Reconstruction (Ninja Tune, 1998)
- U.S.S.R. Life from the Other Side (Ninja Tune, 1999)
- U.S.S.R. Instrumental to Life (Ninja Tune, 1999)
- U.S.S.R. The Art of Listening (Ninja Tune, 2002)
- U.S.S.R. The Art of Instrumentals (Ninja Tune, 2002)
- The Soundcatcher (BBE, 2007)
- U Can't Lurn Imaginashun (BBE, 2009)
- Don't Be Scared (BBE, 2012)
- Dubcatcher (BBE, 2014)
- Grow Slow (BBE, 2015) (with Sena)
- Dubcatcher 2 (Soulbeats Records, 2016)
- Dubcatcher Vol. 3 (Flames up!) (Soulbeats Records, 2018)

Compilation albums

- DJ Vadim Presents: Sculpture and Broken Sound (P-Vine Records, 1997)
- Architects of the Great (Jazz Fudge, 1998)
- The Forgotten Women/Stereo Pictures (MK2, 2003)
- Lettuce Propelled Rockets (JFM, 2005)
- Live in Brooklyn (Mothergrain, 2007)

EPs

- Abstract Hallucinating Gases (Jazz Fudge, 1995)
- Headz Ain't Ready (Jazz Fudge, 1995)
- Bang 2K (Ninja Tune, 2002)
