= Blades (surname) =

Blades is a surname. Notable people with the surname include:

- Al Blades (1977–2003), American football player
- Al Blades Jr. (born 1999), American football player
- Ben C. Blades (1908–1973), American politician
- Cameron Blades (born 1971), Australian rugby union player
- Daniel Blades, Lord Blades (1888–1959), Scottish judge
- Jack Blades (born 1954), American musician
- Jay Blades (born 1970), British furniture restorer and presenter
- Mona Blades, 18-year-old New Zealand woman who disappeared in 1975
- Percibal Blades (born 1943), Panamanian basketball player
- Reanna Blades (born 2005), English footballer
- Rubén Blades (born 1948), Panamanian singer, actor

== See also ==
- Richard Blade (born 1952), radio, television, and film personality
