= The Blade, Reading =

High-rise building in Reading, England

The Blade
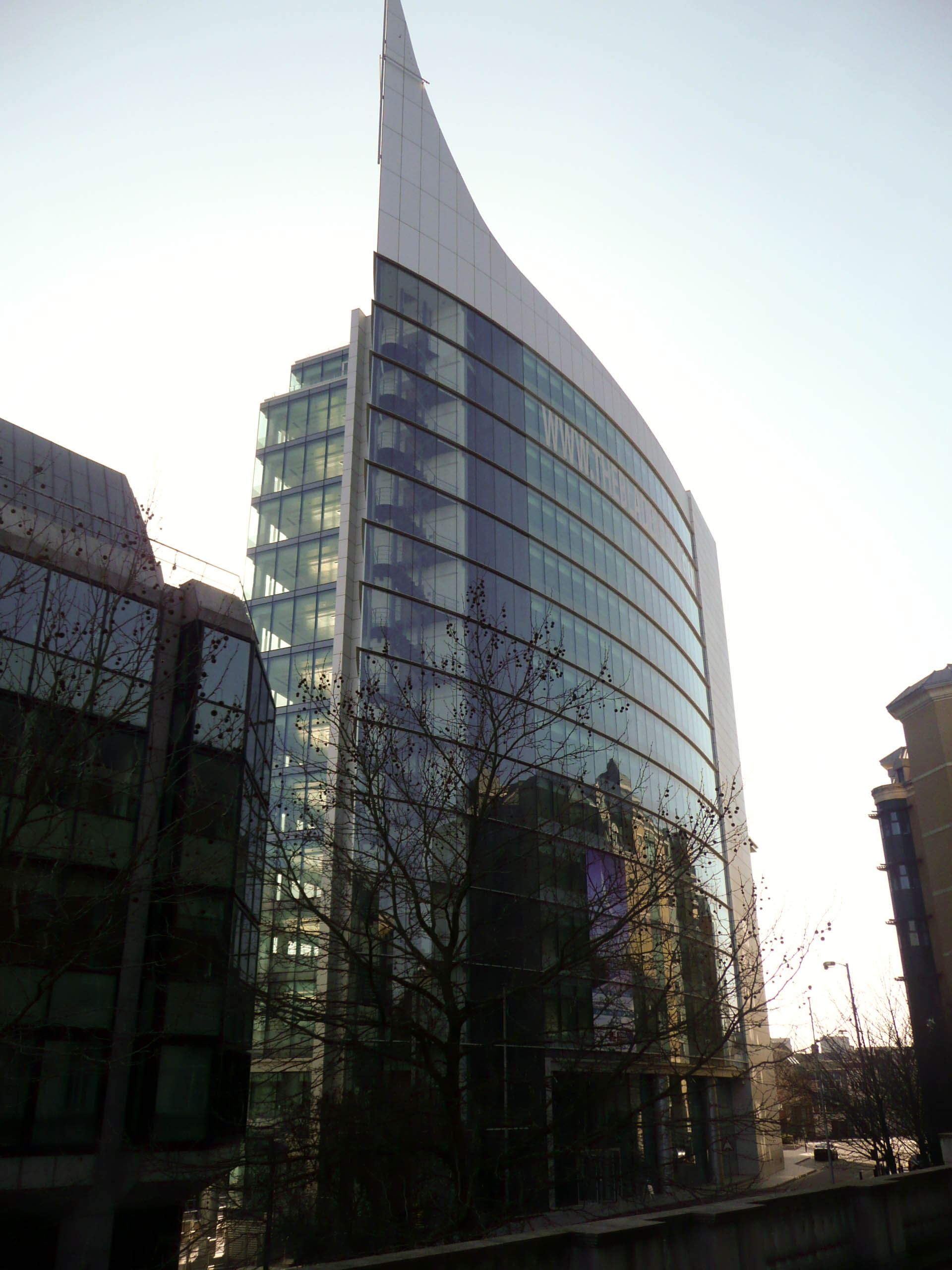
- View from the west

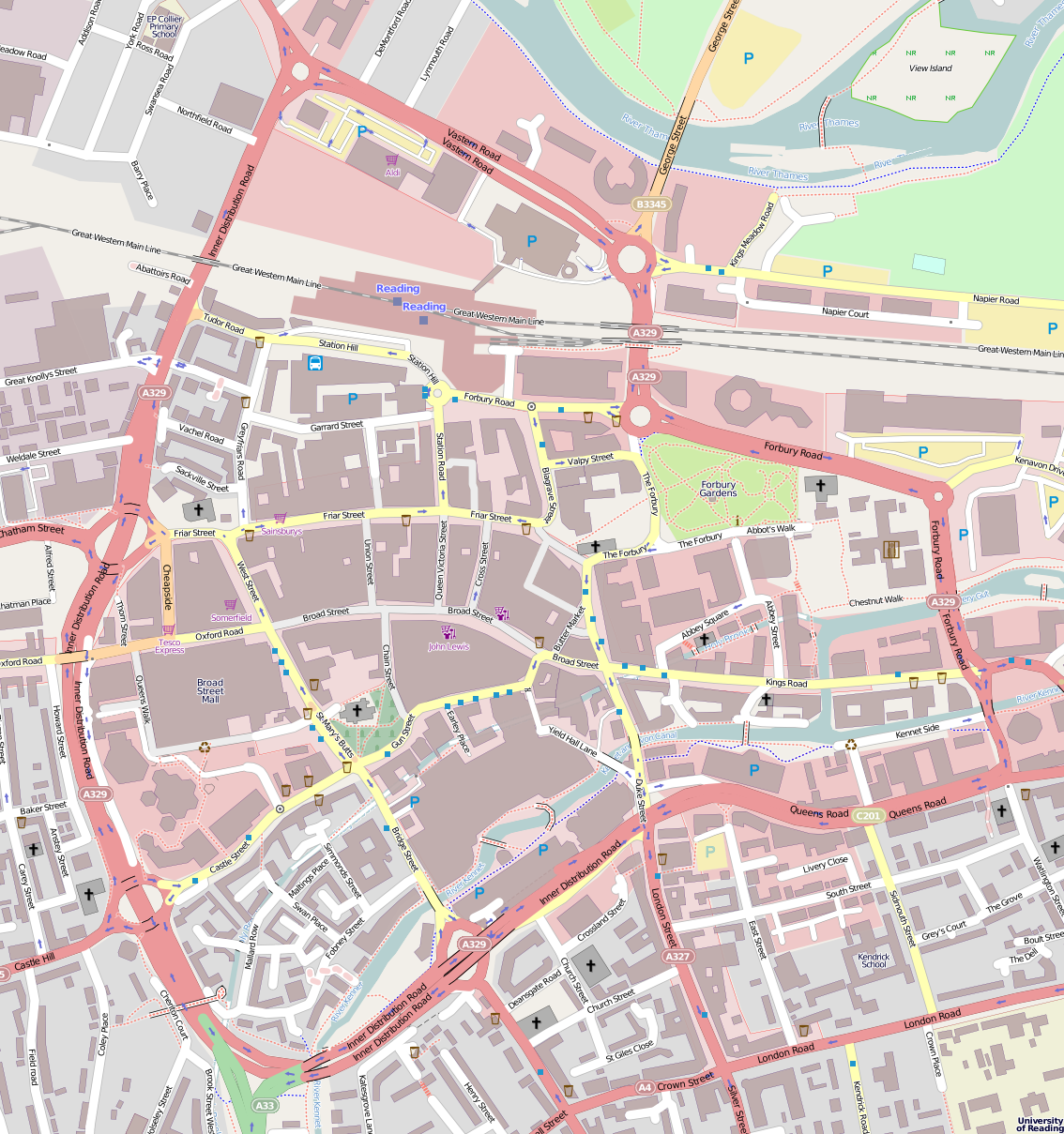
- Location within Reading Central
- Alternative names: Abbey Mill House

General information
- Status: Completed
- Coordinates: 51°27′20.03″N 0°57′59.15″W
- Construction started: 2007
- Completed: 2009
- Cost: £32 million

Height
- Antenna spire: 86 m (282 ft)
- Roof: 59 m (194 ft)

Technical details
- Floor count: 15 (14 above ground, 1 below)
- Lifts/elevators: 5

Design and construction
- Architect: Sheppard Robson
- Developer: PMB Holdings and Aviva Investors

The Blade, also known as Abbey Mill House, is a high-rise and the tallest building in Reading, Berkshire, England. Used for office space, it is 86 metres (282 ft) tall and is visible from many places in the town. The first tenant to occupy the building was Kaplan Financial, who moved to the building from the original Thames Tower.

== Building ==
The high-rise building was proposed in 2001, and construction lasted from 2007 to 2009. It cost £32 million to build.

The 86-metre (282 ft) steel building has 14 floors above ground level; the floor-to-floor height is 3.77 metres (12.4 ft). The building's façade is a curtain wall system of aluminium and glass, and the building is strengthened with a pile foundation. The spire atop the building is a lattice frame covered with rainscreen panels. The height of the building is 128 m (420 ft) above ground level.

The Blade has 110,000 sq ft (10,000 m^{2}) for office use, 7,200 sq ft (670 m^{2}) of space of which was let to Gateley, a law firm, for £34 per sq ft, one of the highest rents Reading has achieved.
