= Aquasky =

English electronic group

- Also known as: Black Noise
- Origin: Bournemouth, England
- Genre: Drum and bass
- Years active: 1990s–present
- Labels: Moving Shadow, Polydor
- Members: Dave Wallace; Kieron Bailey; Brent Newitt
- Website: www.aquasky.co.uk

Aquasky is an English electronic group composed of Dave Wallace, Kieron Bailey, and Brent Newitt. In early 1995 they got together to produce their own music. Shortly afterwards they sent a demo tape to Moving Shadow records and the seeds of a musical alliance were sown. The first single 'Dezires / Images' (Shadow 64) was released three months later and remixed by Krust (Shadow 64R).

Originally a drum and bass outfit, the trio have also become involved in the breaks scene using the moniker Aquasky vs. Masterblaster to denote their breaks projects. They retained Aquasky for drum and bass projects. The addition of Masterblaster however led to great confusion amongst fans. So Masterblaster was dropped and everything is once again being released under the name Aquasky. The trio are also responsible for creating and running the Passenger label established in 1997 (as well as its sister label 777 established in 2004) which continues to release their style of heavy drum and bass influenced breaks.

The trio now operate under the name "Black Noise" releasing electro house songs for "Southern Fried Records".

== Discography ==
=== Albums ===
- Orange Dust (1997)
- Bodyshock (1999)
- Aftershock (2000)
- Beat the System (2002)
- Stayfresh (2003)
- Teamplayers (2006)
- Raise the Devil (2011)
- Doing it With the R (2014)

=== Compilations/mixes ===
- Moving Shadow 99.2 (1999)
- Beat The System Mixed (2002)
- Stayfresh Mixed (2003)
- All Points Covered (2003)
- Breakbeat Bass (2005)
- Breakbeat Elite (2005)
- Breakbeat Bass 2 (2006)
- Breakbeat Bass 4 (2008)
- Shadow Era, Pt. 1 (2015)
- Shadow Era, Pt. 2 (2015)

=== Singles/EPs ===
- Dezires / Images (1995)
- Tranquility: Remixes (1996)
- Nylon Roadster / Cosmic Glue (1996)
- Tranquility / Kauna (1996)
- Concrete Boom (1997)
- Cosmic Glue (1997)
- Orange Dust / Opaque (1997)
- Raw Skillz / Opaque (1997)
- Strategy / Vortex (1997)
- The Stalker / Bulletproof (1999)
- Nightvision / Overkill (1999)
- Sonix / Gemini (1999)
- Subdivision / 2000 AD (1999)
- Radium EP (2000)
- Aftershock: Limited Edition Sampler (2000)
- Tracks From Out Patients LP (2000)
- Lords of Motion / Ghost (2000)
- Airforce / Galaxies (2000)
- 10.09 (2001)
- Spectre / I Can't Wait (No More) (2001)
- Badlands / Sucker Punch (2001)
- Ghost (J-Raq remix) / Lords of Motion (Technical Itch remix) (2001)
- The Shamen (2001)
- Insomniak / Do Anything (2002)
- Baby It's You! / Do Anything (Calibre remix) (2002)
- Badlands (Simon Smith and Drumsound remix) / Sucker Punch (Accidental Heroes mix) (2002)
- Minder / Painkiller (2002)
- Research & Development Part 1 (2003)
- Generation X / Haze (2003)
- One Day / Brazil 66 (2003)
- Warrior / Blow Your Mind (2003)
- Right Here / Underworld (2004)
- Magnetic / Fo' Schizzle (2004)
- Atlanta / Fo' Schizzle (2004)
- Floor 2 Floor / Influence (2004)
- Movin' The Hype Track (2004)
- What's Down Low (Aquasky "Assassin" remix) / Red Out (2005)
- Party Skank / Ready For This (2005)
- Dirty Entertainerz (2005)
- Overneath (2005)
- Overneath / Good Sound (2005)
- Direct Hit / Whole Lotta Hate (2005)
- Girls And Boys (2006)
- Time Up / What Can You Do? (2006)
- Girls And Boys / Good Sound (2006)
- Red Out / Addiction (Remixes) (2006)
- Movin' The Hype Track (Remixes) (2006)
- Feathers (2006)
- Time Up / Bring It On Down (Remixes) (2006)
- Bring It On Down (Aquasky VIP) / Ready For This (Baobinga remix) (2007)
- Have A Good Time (2007)
- Let Me See Your Hands (2007)
- Wasted Music / Another Dimension (2007)
- Sucker Punch / Freak Show (2007)
- The Hip Hop EP (2008)
- Give It Up (Old Skool Style) (2008)
- Tell Me You Love It (2008)
- Deep Fat Frequency EP (2009)
- Living Legends (2010)
- You Take Me There (2011)
- Bring The Ruckus (Remixes by Funtcase and Genetix) (2013)
- Side To Side / Bounce (2014)
- Dezires (Krust remix) / Images (Trip Hop remix) (2023)
- Don't Go / K-Rox (2023)
