= Blade (musician) =

British rapper and producer

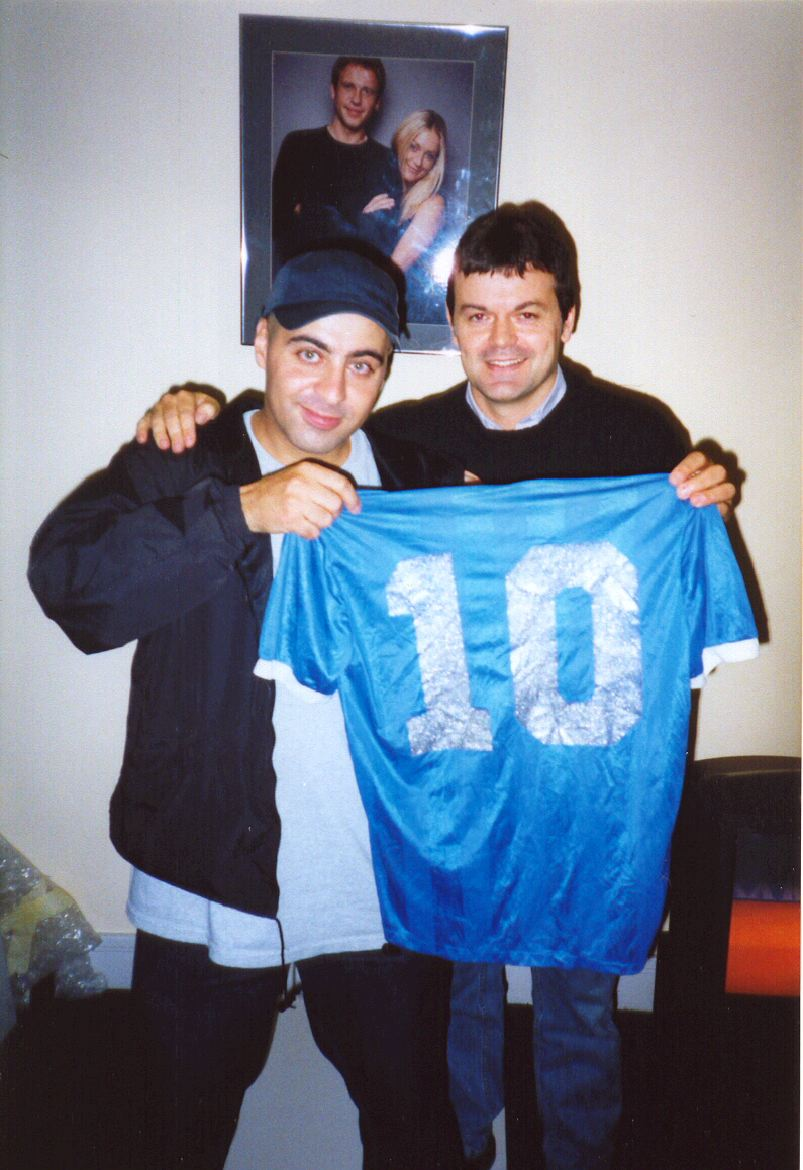
Blade poses with Steve Hodge holding a Maradona jersey on Soccer AM.

Blade is a British rapper who started his hip-hop career during the early 1980s. He is widely recognized as being the first British rapper to have released a double album on a fully independent label, being the first hip-hop artist selling records on the streets direct to fans, and using the crowdfunding method before the term existed.

Music journalist Will Ashon famously described Blade as "the underdog's underdog".

== Early life ==
Blade was born in Tehran, Iran and is of Armenian descent. At the age of four, he was sent to Calcutta, India, to attend a boarding school, where he stayed from 1973 to 1976. At the age of seven, he relocated to London and continued his education as a boarding student at Christ's College in Blackheath from 1976 to 1985.

During the Iran/Iraq War, unable to return to his birth city, Blade remained at his boarding school all year round for almost ten years, doing a variety of jobs there to maintain his residency. After leaving Christ's College as a student, he earned a job working in the kitchen as a dishwasher and kitchen assistant. He had first been offered the job as a student as a means to contribute toward his school fees because his parents were unable to send money out of Iran due to an embargo.

During this time, he crafted his skills as a beatboxer and MC and was soon performing at school discos and anywhere the opportunity presented itself. His name is an acronym for "Beneficial Living Always Develops through Experience". He also regularly frequented Covent Garden which was considered by many as the central hub for UK hip hop during this era (1983–1986).

== Early career ==
Early in his career, Blade had partnered with fellow South London native Merlin MC who would go on to achieve chart success alongside Beatmasters and Bomb the Bass. Blade's own career would truly begin in 1986, after meeting producers Mastermix and 2000 Adee. Both Mastermix and 2000 Adee would work with Blade on his early releases, the first of which was his debut single, 'Lyrical Maniac' (1989). The single was recorded during sessions at Cold Storage Studios in Brixton's Acre Lane. The sessions were donated to Blade by Pete Tong, a club and radio DJ who was, at the time, A&R officer at London Records. The sessions were engineered by "No Sleep" Nigel (Nigel Laybourne), a producer and engineer who worked extensively with British rap artists in the 1980s and 1990s. Nigel would play a part in every Blade release for the next 10 years. Scratches were provided by DJ Renegade, who would remain Blade's live and studio DJ until 1993 before joining Son of Noise.

Initially, 300 self-funded white label copies of 'Lyrical Maniac' were pressed. However, only 10 copies survived after Blade pretended that they had a manufacturing fault due to financial difficulty and to request a refund. Discouraged, depressed and suicidal, Blade was standing on a railway platform and considering jumping when he was approached by a friend who shared the news that Capital Radio hip hop DJ Tim Westwood had played his record. Blade has always referred to this as a life-saving moment.

One record store he approached was Cavern Records, in Lewisham Centre. After a few reorders, they offered him a record deal. This saw the birth of Raw Bass Records, but the partnership proved short-lived as they were not interested in releasing his second single, 'Mind of an Ordinary Citizen' (691 Influential, 1990). Blade went on to self-fund this project, which saw the inauguration of his own label named after the local telephone dialing code in the New Cross area.

A third single, 'Rough It Up' (691 Influential, 1991), was released and sold in the same manner, followed by the 'Survival of the Hardest Workin'' EP (691 Influential, 1992) which saw him begin to sell his records by mail order; a method which journalist Donna Snell had described as "naive" back in 1992.

== Lion Goes from Strength to Strength (1993) ==
Released on Blade's own 691 Influential record label, this was Blade's debut full-length album. Word spread that Blade needed the funds to complete the recording and manufacture of the album and so was born the idea to raise the money through crowdfunding. The idea was for people to send the purchase value to Blade via his already existent PO Box mail order facility and in return all advance orders would receive a free 7" limited edition vinyl of an exclusive track. The idea was a much bigger success than Blade had anticipated and the 7" turned into a 12" release with two tracks that have never been released except as the free vinyl giveaway. The album was a double vinyl release which also boasts an 11.5" square lyric booklet with photos, credits and also the names of all the advance buyers and supporters. This album is widely regarded as the first time the Kickstarter method was used to sell music, almost seventeen years before Kickstarter was even founded. There are also only twenty copies of the album on limited white vinyl. One copy of the limited white vinyl sold second-hand at 1000 GBP. The album was reissued in 2010 on CD.

Blade continued touring but soon brought everything to a standstill while dealing with the loss of his father and the birth of his first son, and aside from a couple of minor releases for survival purposes between 1993 and 1997, he maintained a relatively low profile.

A few more releases – including 'Rhyme Bomb' (1997), the only record he released through an American label (Bomb Records).

== Mark B and Blade ==
Mark B and Blade met when producer and DJ Mark booked Blade for a show in Kingston-upon-Thames in 1991. Mark had wanted to work with Blade for many years after that initial meeting, but Blade didn't feel Mark's production suited him so rejected the idea. They maintained a good friendship and, over the years, Blade would guide Mark with production techniques more suited to rappers. In 1998, they recorded together for the first time. Blade gave full production duties on the Hitmen for Hire EP (Jazz Fudge, 1998) to Mark but was never really satisfied with the result, often labelling the sound as "too clinical".

=== The Unknown (2000) ===
Their 2000 album, The Unknown, was instrumental in elevating the profile of UK hip-hop artists. It was well-received and achieved chart success, becoming the first UK Hip-Hop to sell over 50'000 copies. The duo toured extensively and received heavy media coverage, including daytime playlisting by BBC Radio One. The song "Ya Don't See The Signs" (2001) reached No. 23 in the UK singles chart, leading to the pair performing on Top of the Pops. They also undertook a tour supporting Eminem.

Despite the duo's considerable success, Blade's partnership with Mark B was halted. The record deal belonged to Mark B, with Blade only being considered a featured artist. During this time, Blade also faced personal difficulties, including a violent street attack and temporary homelessness.

== Storms Are Brewing (2004) ==
Blade remortgaged his house to fund his next LP, 'Storms Are Brewing' (691 Influential, 2004) yet a week before the record was released, the distributor he had signed with, 3MV, declared bankruptcy.

== Guerrilla Tactics (2006) and retirement ==
Following his experiences with 3MV, Blade was again considering walking away from music, but a chance meeting with Derby-based producer Baby J at the UK Takeover event in Nottingham in 2004, led to another album. His final show would be in Winchester on 6 October 2006. It would be a full ten years before Blade would be seen again, and only after Mark B's untimely passing in 2016, to perform a tribute show at the Boom Bap Festival.

In 2006, Blade accidentally stumbled on a new business venture manufacturing CDs, which he kept active until 2020.

== 2020–present ==
Blade currently runs a YouTube channel called "05:21 Official", conducting interviews with artists and filming live performances in a studio environment.
