= The Electric (band) =

British electronica band

The Electric was a British electronica band, founded by original members DJ Vadim, Ste Simpson, Sabira Jade and Pugs Atomz in 2010. Simpson left the band in 2011 before the band's debut album, Life is Moving, was released.
