= Yarah Bravo =

Swedish singer-songwriter and rapper

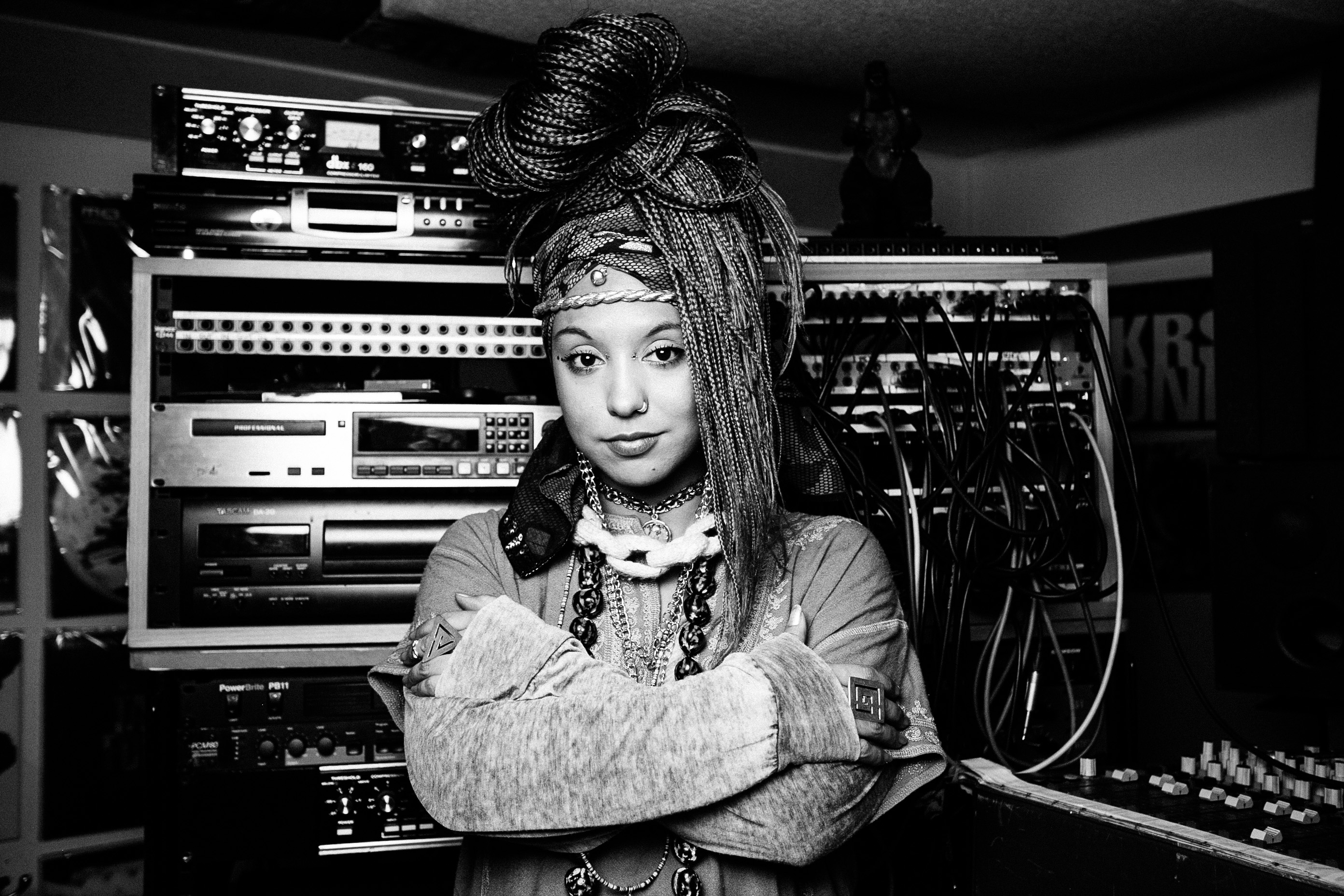

Background information
- Also known as: The Mothergrain; Captain Love Bubble
- Genres: Hip Hop; Rap; Spoken word; RnB
- Occupations: Singer; Producer; MC; Poet
- Instruments: Vocals; Drum machine
- Years active: 2002–present
- Label: Independent
- Website: yarahbravo.com

Yarah Bravo is a singer-songwriter, rapper, poet, and beatmaker. Born to a Chilean mother and a Brazilian father who came to Sweden as political refugees,she sings and raps in English, Swedish and Spanish.

She is best known for the song “Bluebird” with the group called Oneself, as well as her EP’s Love is a Movement and Good Girls Rarly Make History. Bravo was one of the MC’s of the group alongside MC Blurum 13. Their debut album, Children of Possibility was released on the record label Ninja Tune.

== Early life ==
Bravo started writing as a young teenager as a way to handle her parents' breakup. She formed her first group at 16 years old, an all-girl group called B.o.B. She was part of the hip hop scene in her hometown, Lund, in the 90s. She moved to London at age 18.

Throughout her career, Bravo has focused on highlighting other female talents and has had an all-female band on stage on many occasions, bringing together up-and-coming artists for international tours.

== Career ==
In 2008 she curated U.N.I.T.Y., the all-female stage at the Hip Hop Kemp Festival, with Roxane Shante, Bahamadia, Invincible, Dj Shorty, Stacy Epps, Eternia, Cleo Missaoui, Syster Sol, Vaitea, Darshania, and others.

Bravo has collaborated with many artists, including Fat Freddy's Drop, French experimental hip hop group TTC (Big Dada) and Polish Jazz duo Skalpel (Ninja Tune), Gavlyn, Organized Threat, The Polish Ambassador, Mykah 9, Abstract Rude, Aceyalone, Figub, Miss ill, The Electric, The Nextmen, Rodney P, Dynamite Mc, Kidkanevil, and Anna The Unused Word.

She has worked with and shared the stage with Talib Kweli, Manu Chao, Grand Master Flash, Mos Def, Roots Manuva, De La Soul, The Herbaliser, and The Gotan Project.

Yarah Bravo has toured the world several times with different artists and constellations. And performed at many festivals including Roskilde, Splash Festival, Fusion Festival, Gilles Peterson's Worldwide Festival - Sète, Soundwave Croatia, Electric Castle, Open'er Festival.

In 2011 Yarah went into fashion for a short period of time and opened a pop up boutique shop "The Captain Love Bubble" in London, Shoreditch, together with Mimi Fresh (stylist to Erykah Badu) and fellow hip hop artist Sheila Mukasa.

Bravo has lived in Sweden, England, the United States, and Germany.

== Discography ==
=== Studio albums ===
According to Discogs and MusicBrainz, Bravo has released two albums:

- Good Girls Rarely Make History (Mothergrain Records, 2008)
- Love Is The Movement (Duzz Down San, 2014)

=== Collaborative albums ===
- Children Of Possibility with One Self (Ninja Tune 2005)
- Organically Grown with One Self (Mothergrain Records / OGS 2006)

=== Collaborations ===
- One Self – Be Your Own (Ninja Tune, 2005)
- One Self – Bluebird (Ninja Tune, 2005)
- One Self – Paranoid / Over Expose (Ninja Tune, 2005)
- Skalpel feat Yarah Bravo – Voice of Reason (Ninja Tune)
- Dj Vadim feat Yarah Bravo – The Pacifist (Ninja Tune)
- Dj Vadim feat Yarah Bravo – She Who Is Tested (Ninja Tune)
- Dj Vadim feat Yarah Bravo – Cum Shots (Ninja Tune)
- Dj Vadim feat Yarah Bravo – You are Yours (Ninja Tune)
- The Electric feat Yarah Bravo – Beautiful (BBE Records)
- The Polish Ambassador feat Yarah Bravo – Nobody's Alone
- Paco Mendoza feat Yarah Bravo – Candela
