= Big K.R.I.T. discography =

Hip hop recording artist discography

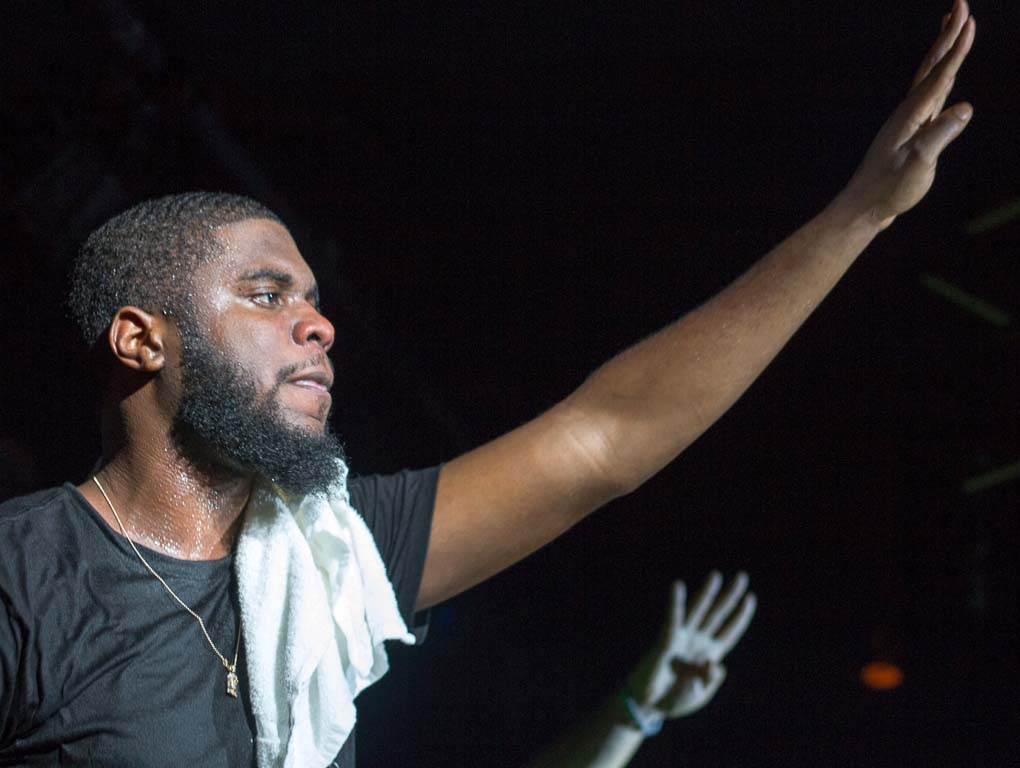
- K.R.I.T. in October 2014
- Studio albums: 5
- Extended plays: 5
- Singles: 45
- Mixtapes: 14

American hip hop recording artist and music producer Big K.R.I.T. has released five studio albums, five extended plays (EP), fourteen mixtapes and 45 singles (including 24 as a featured artist) and three promotional singles.

== Albums ==
=== Studio albums ===
List of studio albums, with selected chart positions and sales figures
Title	Album details	Peak chart positions				Sales
Title	Album details	US	US R&B	US Rap	CAN	Sales
Live from the Underground	Released: June 5, 2012; Label: Cinematic, Def Jam; Format: CD, LP, digital download	5	1	1	57	
Cadillactica	Released: November 10, 2014; Label: Cinematic, Def Jam; Format: CD, LP, digital download	5	1	1	—	
4eva Is a Mighty Long Time	Released: October 27, 2017; Label: Multi Alumni, BMG; Format: CD, LP, digital download	7	5	4	—	US: 45,512
K.R.I.T. Iz Here	Released: July 12, 2019; Label: Multi Alumni, BMG; Format: CD, LP, digital download	16	10	8	—	
Digital Roses Don't Die	Released: February 18, 2022; Label: Multi Alumni, BMG; Format: CD, LP, digital download	—	—	—	—	
Dedicated To Cadalee Biarritz	Released: December 5, 2025; Label: Multi Alumni, ONErpm; Format: LP, digital download	—	—	—	—	
"—" denotes a recording that did not chart or was not released in that territory.

=== Collaborative albums ===
Title	Album details
Full Court Press (with Wiz Khalifa, Smoke DZA and Girl Talk)	Released: April 8, 2022; Label: Taylor Gang, Asylum; Format: LP, digital download

=== Compilation albums ===
Title	Album details
All My Life	Released: November 20, 2015; Label: RBC; Format: Digital download
TDT	Released: January 11, 2019; Label: Multi Alumni, BMG; Format: LP, digital download

== Extended plays ==
Title	EP details
R4 the Prequel	Released: June 7, 2011; Label: Def Jam; Format: CD, digital download
4eva N a Day (Road Less Traveled Edition)	Released: April 10, 2012; Label: Cinematic; Format: CD, digital download
Thrice X	Released: November 16, 2018; Label: Multi Alumni, BMG; Format: Digital download
Double Down	Released: November 30, 2018; Label: Multi Alumni, BMG; Format: Digital download
Trifecta	Released: December 14, 2018; Label: Multi Alumni, BMG; Format: Digital download
Regardless It's Still Timeless	Released: December 15, 2023; Label: Multi Alumni; Format: Digital download

== Mixtapes ==
Title	Mixtape details
See Me on Top	Released: July 20, 2005
See Me on Top II	Released: December 21, 2005
Hood Fame	Released: August 11, 2006
See Me on Top III	Released: December 10, 2008
The Last King	Released: May 15, 2009
K.R.I.T. Wuz Here	Released: May 4, 2010
Return of 4Eva	Released: March 28, 2011
Last King 2: God's Machine	Released: August 19, 2011
4eva N a Day	Released: March 5, 2012
King Remembered in Time	Released: April 10, 2013
See Me on Top IV	Released: September 16, 2014
It's Better This Way	Released: October 14, 2015
#12FOR12	Released: July 5, 2016
A Style Not Quite Free	Released: August 13, 2021

== Singles ==
=== As lead artist ===
List of singles, with selected chart positions, showing year released and album name
Title	Year	Peak chart positions		Album
Title	Year	US R&B	US Rap	Album
"No Wheaties" (featuring Currensy and Smoke DZA)	2010	—	—	K.R.I.T. Wuz Here
"Country Shit"	2010	—	—	K.R.I.T. Wuz Here
"Country Shit (Remix)" (featuring Ludacris and Bun B)	2011	50	20	Return of 4Eva
"Faded" (with Boston George)	2011	—	—	Non-album single
"Play the Game" (with Freddie Gibbs and Statik Selektah)	2011	—	—	Population Control
"Money on the Floor" (featuring 8Ball & MJG and 2 Chainz)	2011	101	—	Live from the Underground
"Yeah Dat's Me"	2012	—	—	Live from the Underground
"What U Mean" (featuring Ludacris)	2012	—	—	Live from the Underground
"Mt. Olympus"	2014	—	—	Non-album single
"Pay Attention" (featuring Rico Love)	2014	—	—	Cadillactica
"Cadillactica"	2014	—	—	Cadillactica
"Soul Food" (featuring Raphael Saadiq)	2014	—	—	Cadillactica
"Free Agent"	2016	—	—	Non-album single
"Confetti"	2017	—	—	4eva Is a Mighty Long Time
"Keep the Devil Off"	2017	—	—	4eva Is a Mighty Long Time
"Aux Cord"	2017	—	—	4eva Is a Mighty Long Time
"Ready for the Next"	2017	—	—	Non-album single
"1999" (featuring Lloyd)	2018	—	—	4eva Is a Mighty Long Time
"K.R.I.T. Here"	2019	—	—	K.R.I.T. Iz Here
"Addiction" (featuring Lil Wayne and Saweetie)	2019	—	—	K.R.I.T. Iz Here
"Kickoff"	2020	—	—	Madden NFL 21
"—" denotes a title that did not chart, or was not released in that territory.

=== As featured artist ===
List of singles, with selected chart positions, showing year released and album name
Title	Year	Peak chart positions			Album
Title	Year	US	US R&B	US Rap	Album
"Where It's At" (Cory Mo featuring Big K.R.I.T. and J Bean)	2010	—	—	—	It's Been About Time
"This My World" (Chamillionaire featuring Big K.R.I.T.)	2011	—	—	—	Non-album single
"On the Corner" (Smoke DZA featuring Bun B and Big K.R.I.T.)	2011	—	—	—	Rolling Stoned
"I'm Flexin'" (T.I. featuring Big K.R.I.T.)	2011	66	32	23	Non-album single
"Make My" (The Roots featuring Big K.R.I.T. and Dice Raw)	2011	—	—	—	Undun
"Parked Outside" (Jackie Chain featuring Bun B and Big K.R.I.T.)	2011	—	—	—	Non-album singles
"Patience" (AD featuring Big K.R.I.T. and Che Blaq)	2012	—	—	—	Non-album singles
"Do You Believe?" (David Banner featuring Big K.R.I.T.)	2012	—	—	—	Sex, Drugs & Video Games
"Jet Life" (Curren$y featuring Big K.R.I.T. and Wiz Khalifa)	2012	—	77	—	The Stoned Immaculate
"The Resurrection of Hip Hop" (Lyn Charles featuring Big K.R.I.T.)	2012	—	—	—	American Tragedy
"Lights Down" (Statik Selektah & Termanology featuring Big K.R.I.T.)	2012	—	—	—	AGE: Open Season
"Gossip" (Big Boi featuring UGK and Big K.R.I.T.)	2012	—	—	—	Vicious Lies and Dangerous Rumors
"Mayday" (Lecrae featuring Big K.R.I.T. and Ashthon Jones)	2012	—	—	—	Gravity
"Coming Down (Every Town)" (Slim Thug featuring Z-Ro, Big K.R.I.T. and Kirko Bangz)		—	—	—	Boss Life
"Hold Up" (Cory Mo featuring Big K.R.I.T. and Talib Kweli)	2013	—	—	—	Take It or Leave It
"Faded" (Boston George featuring Big K.R.I.T. and Slim Thug)	2013	—	—	—	Non-album singles
"Away" (Kenneth Whalum III featuring Big K.R.I.T.)	2014	—	—	—	Non-album singles
"Big Pimpin" (June featuring Big K.R.I.T.)	2014	—	—	—	Non-album singles
"Somethin' Right" (DJ Infamous featuring Big K.R.I.T. and Yo Gotti)	2014	—	—	—	Non-album singles
"The Resume" (BJ the Chicago Kid featuring Big K.R.I.T.)	2015	—	—	—	In My Mind
"I Am Somebody" (DJ Greg Street featuring Akon, B.o.B and Big K.R.I.T.)	2016	—	—	—	non-album single
"Might Not Be Ok" (Kenneth Whalum featuring Big K.R.I.T.)	2016	—	—	—	Broken Land
"Hold Me Down" (Cooli Highh featuring Big K.R.I.T. and Jennesy)	2017	—	—	—	non-album singles
"Too Late" (Gracen Hill featuring Big K.R.I.T.)	2019	—	—	—	non-album singles
"—" denotes a title that did not chart, or was not released in that territory.

=== Promotional singles ===
List of singles, with selected chart positions, showing year released and album name
Title	Year	Album
"I'm On 2.0" (Trae Tha Truth featuring Jadakiss, Big K.R.I.T., J. Cole, Kendrick Lamar, B.o.B, Tyga, Gudda Gudda, Bun B and Mark Morrison)	2012	Tha Blackprint
"I'm Gone" (THEBLKHANDS featuring Big K.R.I.T.)	2012	Serbia
"I Got This"	2012	Live from the Underground

== Other charted songs ==
List of songs, with selected chart positions, showing year released and album name
Title	Year	Peak chart positions			Album	Certifications
Title	Year	US	US R&B	US Rap	Album	Certifications
"1 Train" (ASAP Rocky featuring Kendrick Lamar, Joey Badass, Yelawolf, Danny Brown, Action Bronson and Big K.R.I.T.)	2013	103	31	25	Long.Live.ASAP	RIAA: Gold
"—" denotes a recording that did not chart or was not released in that territory.

== Guest appearances ==
List of non-single guest appearances, with other performing artists, showing year released and album name
Title	Year	Other artist(s)	Album
"Glass House"	2010	Wiz Khalifa, Curren$y	Kush & Orange Juice
"Get By"	2010	Mickey Factz	I'm Better Than You
"Etc Etc"	2010	Smoke DZA, Curren$y	George Kush da Button
"The Secret"	2010	Smoke DZA	George Kush da Button
"Skybourne"	2010	Curren$y, Smoke DZA	Pilot Talk
"Hold You Down" (Remix)	2010	Laws, Emilio Rojas	4:57 Mixtape
"Nothing Like Me"	2010	Kent Money	Becoming
"In tha Morning"	2010	YG, Big Sean, Ty$	—N/a
"Coming From"	2010	Slim Thug, J-Dawg	Tha Thug Show
"Problem"	2010	Chris Webby	Best In The Burbs
"Pimps"	2011	Tity Boi, Bun B	Codeine Cowboy (A 2 Chainz Collective)
"Cruise Control"	2011	Mike Jaggerr	The Eleventh Hour
"Full of Shit"	2011	Rittz, Yelawolf	White Jesus
"Murder (Act II)"	2011	CunninLynguists	Oneirology
"I Have Dreams"	2011	Blood Type	2 Weeks Notice
"Hometeam"	2011	Wes Fif, CyHi the Prynce, Dreamer (of Hollyweerd)	Golden Nights
"We What’s Happenin'"	2011	International Jones, Smoke DZA	Tennis Shoes & Tuxedos
"Gotta Get Paid"	2011	Smoke DZA	T.H.C. (The Hustler's Catalog)
"1st Class"	2011	Smoke DZA, Big Sant	T.H.C. (The Hustler's Catalog)
"War Stories"	2011	Self Scientific	Trials of the Blackhearted
"M I Crooked Letter"	2011	Boo Rossini	—N/a
"Grippin' on the Wood"	2011	Pimp C, Bun B	Still Pimping
"So Be It"	2011	Rapsody	Thank H.E.R. Now
"Born on the Block"	2011	Big Sid, Killer Mike	Failure's Not an Option
"The Life of Kings"	2011	Phonte, Evidence	Charity Starts At Home
"Black Soul"	2011	Gilbere Forte	Some Dreams Never Sleep EP
"Beautiful"	2011	Talib Kweli, Outasight	American Cancer Society
"End of the Night"	2011	P.Watts, Sean Haynes	Element of Surprise
"I'm On Fire"	2011	Ludacris	1.21 Gigawatts: Back to the First Time
"5 on the Kush"	2011	B.o.B, Bun B	E.P.I.C. (Every Play is Crucial)
"Yoko"	2011	Chris Brown, Berner, Wiz Khalifa	Boy In Detention
"Look at Me Now"	2011	Eldorado Red	G5: Jeffe Music
"Go Girl"	2012	Yo Gotti, Big Sean, Wiz Khalifa	Live from the Kitchen
"Mayday"	2012	Lecrae, Ashton Jones	Gravity
"Keep It Trill"	2012	Mr. Sipp	Summer in the Winter
"Home Again"	2012	Tha Joker	Why So Serious? 2
"Rock & Role"	2012	Eldorado Red	McRado's 2
"We Buy Gold"	2012	8Ball, MJG	Life's Quest
"They Ready"	2012	DJ Khaled, Kendrick Lamar, J. Cole	Kiss the Ring
"I Live This Shit"	2012	Alley Boy	The Gift of Discernment
"Going Off"	2012	T-Pain	Stoic
"K!NG"	2012	Smoke DZA	K.O.N.Y.
"Say That Shit"	2012	Big Sant	MFxOG
"I'm On 2.0"	2012	Trae tha Truth, Jadakiss, J. Cole, Kendrick Lamar, B.o.B., Tyga, Gudda Gudda, Bun B	Tha Blackprint
"1 Train"	2013	ASAP Rocky, Kendrick Lamar, Joey Badass, Yelawolf, Action Bronson, Danny Brown	Long.Live.ASAP
"We Drink, We Smoke"	2013	Cyhi the Prynce, Yelawolf	Ivy League: Kick Back
"Underground Airplay"	2013	Joey Badass, Smoke DZA	Underground Airplay
"Check The Sign"	2013	Bun B	—N/a
"Can't Change"	2013	Tha Joker, Tito Lopez	The Explanation
"Convertible Flow"	2013	Cashius Green	Pisces
"Wastin Time"	2013	Rittz	The Life and Times of Jonny Valiant
"Supernatural Love"	2013	Fantasia Barrino	Side Effects of You
"Death Before Dishonor"	2013	SBOE, Smoke DZA	All We Got Is Us
"Game"	2013	Scotty, Trinidad James	Faith
"So Trill"	2013	Kirko Bangz	XXL 2013's Freshmen Class: The Mixtape
"Bad Times"	2013	Gangsta Boo, K-So	It's Game Involved
"Yea That's Me" (Remix)	2013	Jackie Chain, Yelawolf	Bruce Lean Chronicles 2
"That's My Kid"	2013	Tech N9ne, Cee Lo Green, Kutt Calhoun	Something Else
"10 Bricks"	2013	Currensy, Smoke DZA, French Montana	The Stage
"Cake"	2013	Bun B, Lil Boosie, Pimp C	Trill OG: The Epilogue
"In Dat Cup"	2013	E-40, Z-Ro	The Block Brochure: Welcome to the Soil 5
"Pure"	2013	Doughboyz Cashout, Jeezy, Pusha T	#ItsThaWorld2
"Demonology"	2014	Talib Kweli, Gary Clark, Jr.	Gravitas
"Top Ten"	2015	Logic	—N/a
"Come and See Me"	2015	Ludacris	Ludaversal
"Spillin Drank"	2015	Mitchelle'l, T.I.	—N/a
"Jet Pack Blues"	2015	Fall Out Boy	Make America Psycho Again
"Riding Dirty"	2015	TUT	—N/a
"God Bless America"	2015	Dizzy Wright, Tech N9ne, Chel'le	The Growing Process
"In the Wind"	2015	Statik Selektah, Joey Badass, Chauncy Sherod	Lucky 7
"Issues"	2016	Azizi Gibson	A New Life
"Switchin' Lanes"	2016	T.I., Trev Case	Us or Else
"Dusk 2 Dusk"	2016	Pete Rock, Smoke DZA, Dom Kennedy, theMIND	Don't Smoke Rock
"Tranquillo"	2017	Lupe Fiasco, Rick Ross	Drogas Light
"Outrageous"	2017	Dizzy Wright	The Golden Age 2
"Kingz & Bosses"	2017	Slim Thug	The World Is Yours
"Made Man"	2018	PRhyme, Mr. Porter	PRhyme 2
"Time Flies"	2019	Bun B, Statik Selektah, Talib Kweli	TrillStatik
"That Girl"	2019	Erick Sermon, Ricco Barrino	Vernia
"Purpose"	2020	B.o.B	Somnia
"Free"	2021	Russ, Snoop Dogg	Chomp 2
"Miami Blue"	2024	Megan Thee Stallion, Buddah Bless	Megan

== See also ==
- Big K.R.I.T. production discography
- List of songs recorded by Big K.R.I.T.
