= Big K.R.I.T. production discography =

The following list is a discography of production by Big K.R.I.T., an American hip hop record producer and recording artist. It includes a list of songs produced, co-produced and remixed by year, artist, album and title.

== 2005 ==
=== Big K.R.I.T. - See Me on Top ===
- 02. "Grata Lata"
- 03. "See Me On Top"
- 04. "They Gone Hate"
- 05. "A Rapper With A Dream"
- 06. "Twerk A Little Something"
- 07. "5th Wheel"
- 09. "Bring It Back"
- 10. "Jump In"
- 11. "Love Don't Live No Mo"
- 12. "Bigger Pimpin'"
- 13. "Notordia" (featuring C-Roc)
- 14. "My Life Ain't Rosey"
- 15. "I Ain't Playin No Moe"
- 16. "Put Cha Sign In Da Air"
- 17. "Bottom Ain't The Place 4 a 'G"
- 18. "Adidas & 1's In Da Club"
- 19. "Bigger Pimpin' (Chopped & Screwed)"
- 20. "Throwed"

=== Big K.R.I.T. - See Me On Top Vol. II ===
- 02. "Why Not (Snippet)"
- 03. "Bring It Back"
- 05. "Just Touched Down"
- 06. "Stop Drop" (featuring Alfamega)
- 09. "Yo Chick, My Chick"
- 12. "Pull The Drop Out"
- 13. "Playa Why Ya Hatin'"
- 14. "Jump In (Remix)"
- 16. "I Already Know"
- 17. "Keep It Movin'"
- 18. "Go Crazy"
- 19. "3rd Coast"
- 21. "Big Boi Thang"
- 23. "Baby Don't Do It"
- 24. "Adidas & 1's (Chopped & Screwed)" (featuring Jay O)
- 26. "Highly Anticipated" (Bonus Track)

== 2006 ==
=== Big K.R.I.T. - King of the Queen (Hood Fame) ===
- 02. "Ya Dealin' Wit A Vet"
- 03. "Just Touched Down"
- 04. "Roller Skaten"
- 08. "Mary Jane (Spaced Out)"
- 09. "Kingston"
- 10. "On My Grind" (featuring Max Minelli)
- 12. "Baby Don't Do It"
- 13. "Get Ya Issue Straight"
- 16. "Notordia" (featuring C-Roc)
- 18. "Bring It Back"
- 19. "Ridin'"
- 20. "Everybody Waitin'"
- 21. "5th Wheel"
- 22. "Jump In"
- 23. "Hold Up"
- 24. "Take Care Of Mama"

== 2007 ==
=== Ya Boy - Chapter I: The Rise ===
- 01. "Grata Lata" (produced with Chris P Beats, D1 Beatz)
- 05. "Down By the Bay" (produced with Chris P Beats, D1 Beatz)
- 14. "Say Girl" (produced with Chris P Beats, D1 Beatz)

== 2008 ==
=== Big K.R.I.T. - See Me On Top Vol. III ===
- 01. "History Remembers Kings"
- 02. "Don't Lose Count"
- 03. "Stunt Man"
- 05. "How You Feel"
- 06. "She My Biggest Fan"
- 07. "Best Side Off Me"
- 09. "Private Dancer"
- 10. "Grammy Night"
- 11. "Get Money"
- 13. "It's A Movie"
- 14. "Going Places"
- 15. "Lights Out"
- 16. "My Last Time"
- 17. "Boast or Brag"
- 18. "Can You Dig That"
- 19. "Something"
- 20. "King"
- 21. "When I Get Money"
- 22. "Blood Money"
- 23. "Grind To My Grave" (featuring Supamane)
- 24. "Shawty I'm On"

== 2009 ==
=== Big K.R.I.T. - The Last King ===
- 03. "From The South"
- 04. "The Moment"
- 05. "Get Money"
- 06. "Don't Lose Count"
- 07. "Hometown Hero"
- 09. "Send Me An Angel"
- 13. "Go Off"
- 16. "Watch Me Work"
- 17. "Mary Jane (Space Out)"
- 18. "Get Up Off" (featuring Big Sant)
- 19. "Can You Digg That"
- 25. "Booth N Da Sky"

== 2010 ==
=== Big K.R.I.T. - K.R.I.T. Wuz Here ===
- 1. "Return of 4eva" (featuring Big Sant)
- 2. "Country Shit"
- 3. "Just Touched Down"
- 4. "Hometown Hero"
- 5. "Viktorious"
- 6. "See Me On Top"
- 7. "Glass House" (featuring Curren$y & Wiz Khalifa)
- 8. "Children of the World"
- 9. "They Got US"
- 10. "Good Enough"
- 11. "No Wheaties" (featuring Curren$y & Smoke DZA)
- 12. "Something"
- 13. "Moon & Stars" (featuring Devin the Dude)
- 14. "Neva Go Back"
- 15. "Gumpshun"
- 16. "2000 & Beyond"
- 17. "I Gotta Stay"
- 18. "Small As Giant"
- 19. "Voices"
- 20. "I Heard It All" (Bonus Track)

=== Wiz Khalifa - Kush & Orange Juice ===
- 18. "Glass House" (featuring Curren$y & Big K.R.I.T.)

=== Chris Webby - Best In The Burbs ===
- 2. "Problem" (featuring Big K.R.I.T.)

=== Smoke DZA - George Kush da Button ===
- 7. "Good Talk" (featuring Dom Kennedy)
- 7. "Good Talk/911" (featuring Big K.R.I.T & Big Sant) (Deluxe Edition)
- 8. "I'm Saying"

=== Mickey Factz - I'm Better Than You ===
- 14. "Get By" (featuring Big K.R.I.T.)

=== Korleon and Bo Hagon - Luxury Tax ===
- 06. "Big Lights" (Performed by Korleon) (featuring Big K.R.I.T)
- 09. "Hustler's Prayer"
- 13. "Need a Lil Mo"
- 15. "Im Ill" (featuring Chubby Baby, J-Young and Showtime)

=== Kent M$ney - Becoming ===
- 06. "Nothing Like Me" (featuring Big K.R.I.T.)

=== Various artists - Jonny Shipes Presents: Good Talk Vol. 9 ===
- 03. "Tell Me Different" (Performed by Big K.R.I.T.)
- 05. "My Interpretation" (Performed by Big K.R.I.T.)
- 06. "If I Should Die" (Performed by Big K.R.I.T.)
- 07. "Bottom 2 Top" (Performed by Smoke DZA)
- 19. "My Last Time" (Performed by Big K.R.I.T.)

=== Nipsey Hussle - The Marathon ===
- 17. "One Take 3"

=== Smoke DZA ===
- "Always Been (The Smokers Club)" (featuring Mac Miller)

=== Big K.R.I.T. ===
- "All Grown Up"

== 2011 ==
=== Big K.R.I.T. - Return of 4Eva ===
- 1. "R4 Intro"
- 2. "Rise and Shine"
- 3. "R4 Theme Song"
- 4. "Dreamin'"
- 5. "Rotation"
- 6. "My Sub"
- 7. "Sookie Now" (featuring David Banner)
- 8. "American Rapstar"
- 9. "Highs & Lows"
- 10. "Shake It" (featuring Joi)
- 11. "Made Alot" (featuring Big Sant)
- 12. "Lions and Lambs"
- 13. "King's Blues"
- 14. "Time Machine" (featuring Chamillionaire)
- 15. "Get Right"
- 16. "Amtrak"
- 17. "Players Ballad" (featuring Raheem DeVaughn)
- 18. "Another Naive Individual Glorifying Greed and Encouraging Racism"
- 19. "Free My Soul"
- 20. "The Vent"
- 21. "Country Shit" (Remix) (Bonus Track) (featuring Ludacris & Bun B)
- 22. "Shake Junt" (Bonus Track)

=== Big K.R.I.T. - R4: The Prequel ===
- 1. "Sookie Now" (featuring David Banner)
- 2. "Country Shit" (Remix) (Bonus Track) (featuring Ludacris & Bun B)
- 3. "Time Machine" (featuring Chamillionaire)
- 4. "The Vent"
- 5. "Moon & Stars (Remix)" (featuring Curren$y & Killa Kyleon)

=== Freddie Gibbs - Cold Day In Hell ===
- 02. "Rob Me a Nigga" (featuring Alley Boy)

=== Smoke DZA - T.H.C. (The Hustlers Catalog) ===
- 6. "Gotta Get Paid" (featuring Big K.R.I.T.)
- 13. "1st Class" (featuring Big K.R.I.T. & Big Sant)

=== Smoke DZA - Rolling Stoned ===
- 13. "On The Corner" (featuring Big K.R.I.T. & Bun B)

=== Ludacris - 1.21 Gigawatts: Back to the First Time ===
- 12. "What You Smoking On" (featuring Wiz Khalifa)

=== Chamillionaire - Major Pain 1.5 ===
- 06. "Chandelier Ceiling"

=== Chris Brown - Boy In Detention ===
- 21. "Yoko" (featuring Big K.R.I.T., Berner & Wiz Khalifa)

=== Jackie Chain ===
- "Parked Outside" (featuring Big K.R.I.T. & Bun B)

== 2012 ==
=== Big K.R.I.T. - 4eva N a Day ===
- 1. "8:04 AM"
- 2. "Wake Up"
- 3. "Yesterday"
- 4. "Boobie Miles"
- 5. "4evaNaDay (Theme)"
- 6. "Me and My Old School"
- 7. "1986"
- 8. "Country Rap Tunes"
- 9. "Sky Club"
- 10. "Red Eye"
- 11. "Down & Out"
- 12. "Package Store"
- 13. "Temptation"
- 14. "Handwriting"
- 15. "Insomnia"
- 16. "5:04 AM"
- 17. "The Alarm"

=== Big K.R.I.T. - 4evaNaDay: Road Less Traveled Edition ===
- 1. "Boobie Miles"
- 2. "Man On Fire"
- 3. "Sideline"
- 4. "Insomnia"
- 5. "Red Eye"

=== Big K.R.I.T. - Live from the Underground ===
- 1. "LFU300MA (Intro)"
- 2. "Live from the Underground"
- 3. "Cool 2 Be Southern"
- 4. "I Got This"
  - Sample Credit: Willie Hutch - "Theme of Foxy Brown"
- 5. "Money on the Floor" (featuring 8Ball & MJG & 2 Chainz)
- 6. "What U Mean" (featuring Ludacris)
- 7. "My Sub (Pt. 2: The Jackin')"
  - Sample Credit: Indeep - "Last Night a D.J. Saved My Life"
- 8. "Don't Let Me Down"
- 9. "Porchlight" (featuring Anthony Hamilton)
- 10. "Pull Up" (featuring Big Sant & Bun B)
  - Sample Credit: Commodores - "Say Yeah"
- 11. "Yeah Dats Me"
  - Sample Credit: Bobby Womack & Peace - "Across 110th Street"
- 12. "Hydroplaning" (featuring Devin the Dude)
- 13. "If I Fall" (featuring Melanie Fiona)
- 14. "Rich Dad, Poor Dad"
- 15. "Praying Man" (featuring B.B. King)
- 16. "Live from the Underground (Reprise)" (featuring Ms. Linnie)

=== J. Stalin - Memoirs Of A Curb Server ===
- 12. "She The Type" (featuring Too $hort & Big K.R.I.T.)

=== Big Sant - MFxOG ===
- 03. "2 Much"
- 10. "Holdin My Nuts"

=== Alley Boy - The Gift of Discernment ===
- 03. "I Live This Shit" (featuring Big K.R.I.T.)

=== Curren$y - The Stoned Immaculate ===
- 13. "Jet Life" (featuring Big K.R.I.T. & Wiz Khalifa)

=== T.I. ===
- 00. "I'm Flexin'" (featuring Big K.R.I.T.)

=== Nephew - Sticks N' Stones Vol. 1 ===
- 2. "Street Nigga" (featuring Juvenile & Mob Boss)
- 3. "Hustler's Prayer" (featuring Smoke DZA & Killa Kyleon)

=== Eldorado Red - McRado's 2 ===
- 7. "Rock & Role" (featuring Big K.R.I.T.)

=== Various artists - Jonny Shipes Presents: Good Talk Vol. 10 ===
- 05. "5 On It" (Cashius Green featuring Smoke DZA, Big Sant & Big K.R.I.T.
- 14. "Knock You Out" (Juicy J featuring Big K.R.I.T.)
- 21. "Me & My Old School (Remix)" (Big K.R.I.T. featuring Slim Thug & Lil Keke)

=== Fat Trel - Nightmares On E Street ===
- 9. "Swishers & Liquor"
- 10. "Freak It"

=== 8Ball - Life's Quest ===
- 3. "We Buy Gold" (featuring MJG & Big K.R.I.T.)

=== Moe-D ===
- "What Dat Is" (featuring Big K.R.I.T.)

== 2013 ==
=== Bun B - Trill OG: The Epilogue ===
- 02. "Cake" (featuring Big K.R.I.T., Lil Boosie, Pimp C)

=== Slim Thug - Boss Life (album) ===
- 03. "Just Chill" (featuring Big Saint & Big K.R.I.T.)
- 04. "84S"

== 2014 ==
=== DJ Infamous ===
- 00. "Something Right" (featuring Big K.R.I.T. & Yo Gotti)

=== Big K.R.I.T. - Cadillactica ===
- 01. "Kreation (Intro)"
- 02. "Life"
- 03. "My Sub Pt. 3 (Big Bang)"
- 07. "King of the South"
- 08. "Mind Control" (featuring E-40 and Wiz Khalifa)
- 09. "Standby (Interlude)" (featuring Kenneth Whalum III)
- 10. "Do You Love Me for Real" (featuring Mara Hruby)
- 12. "Mo Better Cool" (featuring Bun B, Devin the Dude and Big Sant)
- 14. "Saturdays = Celebration" (featuring Jamie N Commons) (produced with Alex da Kid)
- 15. "Lost Generation" (featuring Lupe Fiasco)
- 17. "Lac Lac" (featuring ASAP Ferg) (bonus track)

=== Rick Ross - Hood Billionaire ===
- 16. "Brimstone" (featuring Big K.R.I.T.)

=== ASAP Ferg - Ferg Forever ===
- 04. "Bonnaroo"
- 07. "Now" (featuring Mz 007 & Crystal Caines)

== 2016 ==
=== Maybach Music Group - Priorities 5 ===
- 03. "Freaky Ho" (Rick Ross feat. Big K.R.I.T., Juicy J and Too Short) (produced with WOLFE de MÇHLS)

== 2017 ==
=== B.o.B - Ether ===
- 04. "Peace Piece" (featuring Big KRIT)

=== Josh Waters - 1.4.3 ===
- 05. "Art of War" (featuring Res)

=== Big K.R.I.T. - 4eva Is a Mighty Long Time ===
Disc one

- 01. "B.I.G. K.R.I.T."
- 03. "Big Bank" (featuring T.I.)
- 07. "Get Up 2 Come Down" (featuring Cee-Lo and Sleepy Brown)
- 08. "Layup"
- 09. "Classic Interlude"
- 11. "Get Away"

Disc Two

- 03. "Keep the Devil Off"
- 04. "Miss Georgia Fornia" (feat Joi)
- 07. "Weekend Interlude"
- 09. "Drinking Sessions"
- 10. "The Light" (feat. Bilal, Robert Glasper, Kenneth Whalum and Burniss Earl Travis II)

== 2018 ==
=== Lil' Keke - Slfmade 2 ===
- 04. "Four Season" (feat. Bun B)
- 05. "I'm Tired"
- 10. "Say Mane" (feat. Big K.R.I.T.)

=== Bun B - Return of the Trill ===
- 01. "Trill Over Everything" (feat. Killa Kyleon)
- 02. "Recognize" (feat. Big K.R.I.T & T.I)
- 04. "Outta Season" (feat. Big K.R.I.T.)
- 06. "Blood on the Dash" (feat. Gary Clark Jr.)
- 10. "Slow It Down" (feat. Big K.R.I.T.)
- 14. "Gone Away" (feat. Gary Clark Jr. & Leon Bridges)

=== Big K.R.I.T. - Thrice X EP ===
- 01. "Higher (King Pt. 6)"
- 02. "Glorious"

== 2019 ==
=== Joell Ortiz - Monday ===
- 07. "Learn You" (feat. Big K.R.I.T.)

=== Big K.R.I.T. - K.R.I.T. Iz Here ===
- 14. "Blue Flame Ballet"

=== Big K.R.I.T. ===
- 00. "Ballad of the Bass (My Sub V)"

== 2022 ==
=== Big K.R.I.T. - Digital Roses Don't Die ===
- 03. "Show U Right"
- 04. "Rhode Clean"
- 06. "Cum Out to Play"
- 07. "Just 4 You"
- 08. "So Cool"
- 10. "Boring"
- 11. "Would It Matter"
- 12. "Generational - Weighed Down"
- 14. "It's Over Now"
- 15. "Wet Lashes & Shot Glasses"
- 16. "All the Time"
- 17. "More Than Roses"

=== Lil' Keke - Lgnd ===
- 05. "Why Would You"
- 09. "These Things" (feat. Big K.R.I.T., Bun B, Tobi Niwgwe)

== 2023 ==
=== Lil' Keke - 25 Summers ===
- 02. "Vibing" (feat. Big K.R.I.T. & B-Legit)
- 09. "Take Your Time"

=== 2 Chainz & Lil Wayne – Welcome 2 Collegrove ===
- 05. "Long Story Short"
