= 2011 BET Hip Hop Awards =

Annual edition for the awards show

- Date: October 11, 2011
- Location: Atlanta Civic Center
- Hosted by: Mike Epps

Television/radio coverage
- Network: BET

The 2011 BET Hip Hop Awards was held on October 11, 2011 at Atlanta Civic Center in the ATL. The show were hosted by Mike Epps. The most nominated act of the ceremony was Lil Wayne with 18 nods, followed by Kanye West and Wiz Khalifa with 9. Rick Ross was the third most nominated with 8 nods, while Chris Brown and Nicki Minaj each scored 6.

The show featured the final television appearance by Heavy D, before his death a month later the ceremony venue, and the first television appearance by T.I. after his 11 month prison sentence for drug charges.

== Performances ==
- Rick Ross & Tony Montana/I'ma Boss
- Big Sean I DO IT/Marvin and Chardonnay
- Future 2 Chainz/Deeper That In The Ocean/Riot
- Rick Ross Kelly Rowland Lil Wayne MGK/King Of Diamonds Movation Wild Boy
- Big K.R.I.T Country Shit/Money In The Floor
- Internet Exclusive Cypher 1 - Chris Sutton, XV, Jay Rock, & Gilbere Forte
- Internet Exclusive Cypher 2 - Rico Staxx, Wais P, Termanology, Sean Cross, French Montana, & Mike Epps
- Cypher 1 - Big K.R.I.T., Tech N9ne, Machine Gun Kelly, Kendrick Lamar, & B.o.B
- Cypher 2 - Reek Da Villain, 2 Chainz, Busta Rhymes, & Ludacris
- Cypher 3 - Lady Of Rage, Blind Fury, Dom Kennedy, & Skillz
- Cypher 4 - Wale, Pill, Stalley, Meek Mill, & Rick Ross of Maybach Music Group
- Cypher 5 - Nitty Scott, MC, Lecrae, Soprano, & Estelle
- Cypher 6 - Ace Hood, Kevin McCall, Tyga, & Chris Brown
- Cypher 7 - Yelawolf, Slaughterhouse (Joe Budden, Crooked I, Joell Ortiz, & Royce da 5'9"), & Eminem of Shady Records

== Winners and nominations ==
=== Best Hip Hop Video ===
Chris Brown featuring Lil Wayne and Busta Rhymes – "Look at Me Now"

- Big Sean featuring Chris Brown – "My Last"
- DJ Khaled featuring Drake, Rick Ross and Lil Wayne – "I'm on One"
- Eminem featuring Rihanna – "Love the Way You Lie"
- Kanye West featuring Rihanna – "All of the Lights"

=== Reese’s Perfect Combo Award (Best Collab) ===
Chris Brown featuring Lil Wayne and Busta Rhymes – "Look at Me Now"

- Ace Hood featuring Rick Ross and Lil Wayne – "Hustle Hard (Remix)"
- Big K.R.I.T. featuring Ludacris and Bun B – "Country Sh*t (Remix)"
- DJ Khaled featuring Drake, Rick Ross and Lil Wayne – "I'm on One"
- Lupe Fiasco featuring Trey Songz – "Out of My Head"

=== Best Live Performer ===
Lil Wayne

- Busta Rhymes
- Cee-Lo Green
- Jay Z
- Kanye West

=== Lyricist of the Year ===
Lil Wayne

- Jay Z
- Nicki Minaj
- Rick Ross
- Kanye West

=== Video Director of the Year ===
Hype Williams

- Gil Green
- Anthony Mandler
- Chris Robinson
- Kanye West

=== Producer of the Year ===
Lex Luger

- J.U.S.T.I.C.E. League
- Kane Beatz
- No I.D.
- Kanye West, Emile, Jeff Bhasker and Mike Dean

=== MVP of the Year ===
Nicki Minaj

- Lil Wayne
- Rick Ross
- Kanye West
- Wiz Khalifa

=== Track of the Year ===
Only the producer of the track nominated in this category.

"Black and Yellow" – Produced by Stargate (Wiz Khalifa)

- "6 Foot 7 Foot" – Produced by Bangladesh (Lil Wayne featuring Cory Gunz)
- "I'm on One" – Produced by T-Minus (DJ Khaled featuring Drake, Rick Ross and Lil Wayne)
- "Look at Me Now" – Produced by Diplo and Afrojack (Chris Brown featuring Lil Wayne and Busta Rhymes)
- "My Last" – Produced by No I.D. (Big Sean featuring Chris Brown)

=== CD of the Year ===
Kanye West – My Beautiful Dark Twisted Fantasy

- Big Sean – Finally Famous
- Lupe Fiasco – Lasers
- Nicki Minaj – Pink Friday
- Wiz Khalifa – Rolling Papers

=== DJ of the Year ===
DJ Khaled

- DJ Drama
- DJ Enuff
- DJ Envy
- DJ Prostyle

=== Rookie of the Year ===
Wiz Khalifa

- Big K.R.I.T.
- Big Sean
- Frank Ocean
- Diggy Simmons
- Tyler, the Creator

=== Made-You-Look Award (Best Hip-Hop Style) ===
Nicki Minaj

- Jay Z
- Lil Wayne
- Kanye West
- Wiz Khalifa

=== Best Club Banger ===
Waka Flocka Flame featuring Wale and Roscoe Dash – "No Hands" (Produced by Drumma Boy)

- Ace Hood – "Hustle Hard" (Produced by Lex Luger)
- DJ Khaled featuring Drake, Rick Ross and Lil Wayne – "I'm on One" (Produced by T-Minus)
- Lil Wayne featuring Cory Gunz – "6 Foot 7 Foot" (Produced by Produced by Bangladesh)
- Wiz Khalifa – "Black and Yellow" (Produced by Stargate)
- YC Worldwide featuring Future – "Racks" (Produced by Sonny Digital)

=== Best Mixtape ===
J. Cole – Friday Night Lights

- Big K.R.I.T. – Return of 4Eva
- B.o.B – No Genre
- Kendrick Lamar – Section.80
- Frank Ocean – Nostalgia, Ultra

=== Sweet 16: Best Featured Verse ===
Busta Rhymes – "Look at Me Now" (Chris Brown featuring Lil Wayne and Busta Rhymes)

- Lil Wayne – "Motivation" (Kelly Rowland featuring Lil Wayne)
- Nicki Minaj – "Monster" (Kanye West featuring Jay Z, Rick Ross, Bon Iver and Nicki Minaj)
- Wiz Khalifa – "Bright Lights, Bigger City" (Cee-Lo Green featuring Wiz Khalifa)
- Wiz Khalifa – "Till I'm Gone" (Tinie Tempah featuring Wiz Khalifa)

=== Hustler of the Year ===
Jay Z

- Diddy
- Lil Wayne
- Rick Ross
- Kanye West

=== Verizon People’s Champ Award (Viewers’ Choice) ===
Chris Brown featuring Lil Wayne and Busta Rhymes – "Look at Me Now"

- Lil Wayne featuring Cory Gunz – "6 Foot 7 Foot"
- Nicki Minaj featuring Drake – "Moment 4 Life"
- Kanye West featuring Rihanna – "All of the Lights"
- Wiz Khalifa – "Black and Yellow"

=== Best Hip Hop Online Site ===
WorldStarHipHop.com

=== I Am Hip Hop ===
LL Cool J
