= King Remembered in Time =

King Remembered In Time

Mixtape by Big K.R.I.T.
- Released: April 10, 2013
- Recorded: 2012–13
- Genre: Hip hop
- Length: 59:36
- Label: Cinematic Music Group
- Producer: Big K.R.I.T.; 9th Wonder

Big K.R.I.T. chronology
Live from the Underground (2012)	King Remembered In Time (2013)	Cadillactica (2014)

Singles from King Remembered In Time
- 1. "Shine On" Released: February 27, 2013

King Remembered In Time is the tenth mixtape by American rapper and record producer Big K.R.I.T. It was released through Cinematic Music Group on April 10, 2013. The mixtape features guest appearances from fellow American rappers Bun B, Future, Trinidad James, Wiz Khalifa, Smoke DZA, and Big Sant. The mixtape's production was handled almost entirely by K.R.I.T. himself, along with a fellow American record producer, 9th Wonder, whom has been the only other contributor on a record.

The mixtape was released on both DatPiff and LiveMixtapes, and as of June 23, 2013, it had been downloaded over 200,000 times on the former.

On October 21, 2014, Nature Sounds released the physical version of King Remembered in Time. The mixtape was included as part of the collection The Underground Edition, which also included his previous mixtapes K.R.I.T. Wuz Here, 4eva N a Day and Return of 4eva issued on vinyl, cassette and compact disc.

== Background ==
Big K.R.I.T. first announced King Remembered In Time on January 10, 2013, revealing that compared to his previous works, this mixtape would have producers aside from himself. He also revealed that he had been working with producer Mike WiLL Made It on the project.

== Promotion ==
In promotion of the album, Big K.R.I.T. released three songs prior to the album's release. The first track, entitled "Reign On" featured production from 9th Wonder and was released on February 14, 2013. It was later used in an advertisement for Crown Royal whiskey. On February 27, he released the first official single for the mixtape, "Shine On" featuring Bun B. Finally, on March 11, he released a black-and-white music video for the song, "R.E.M.".

Following the mixtape's release, it was announced that Big K.R.I.T. would go on an eight stop tour, entitled the "King Remembered In Time Tour", from May 24 to June 1. He was joined by Smoke DZA and Clyde Carson on the tour. On July 18, Big K.R.I.T. released a Chopped and Screwed remix version of the mixtape by Michael "5000" Watts.

== Critical response ==
Professional ratings
Review scores
Source	Rating
Consequence of Sound	3.5/5 stars
Exclaim!	(positive)
HipHopDX	(positive)
Pitchfork Media	6.8/10
XXL	(XL)

King Remembered In Time received generally positive reviews from critics upon its release.

- Edwin Ortiz of HipHopDX stated that, "With 'King Remembered In Time,' Big K.R.I.T. takes on the title of his bold namesake and gives a performance that strengthens his core following." He went on to add that, "K.R.I.T. has unmistakably progressed as a lyricist, and his latest project illustrates this thoroughly with the memorizing licks of 'R.E.M.' and 'Meditate,' as well as the haunting visuals on 'Banana Clip Theory.' Detailing the devastation brought on by gun violence, Big K.R.I.T. twists rhymes as he attests, 'I heard a gun the other day, it spoke to me and told me power / Was the only thing that we could lose, so don't be afraid to let it shower.'" However, he also added that, "If there’s an inadequacy to point out on King Remembered In Time, it would be a slight dip in execution from its predecessors. Whereas Return of 4Eva and 4eva N a Day flowed smoothly between tracks, an unsettling snippet like the Future-assisted 'Just Last Week' or his staggered cadence on 'WTF' stymies an otherwise outstanding track list. Similarly, his hook game hasn’t developed much. In the past he’s gotten away with terse lines on 'Yeah Dats Me' and 'Sookie Now' off the strength of his zeal, but shouting, 'What the fuck we gonna do now?' and 'How you love that?' incessantly isn’t the most creative way to keep someone engaged." Ortiz went on to give the mixtape a rating of "free album", which is HipHopDX's highest possible rating for a mixtape.
- Reed Jackson of XXL noted a change in the way the album was produced from K.R.I.T.'s previous works, stating that, "A noticeable change here is K.R.I.T.’s willingness to expand his production style. His beats have always been appealing – warm and organic, similar to those produced by Organized Noize in the mid 90s during Dungeon Family’s reign." Jon Hadusek of Consequence of Sound gave the mixtape a 3.5/5 stating that, "Big K.R.I.T.’s finest moments, however, come when he’s at his most sincere. The brooding 'Meditate' is a song about retreating from your loved ones and holing up alone for a while. It’s not entirely unhealthy, though K.R.I.T. feels ashamed for leaving their sides. On 'Bigger Picture', he glances into the future and offers a realist’s advice — 'Shit might suck, but you gotta push on.' That self-awareness and perseverance are what got him here."
- Mike Madden of Pitchfork Media gave the album a 6.8/10 rating, stating that, "Despite the mixtape's major features (Bun B, Wiz Khalifa, Future), its interesting risk-taking (there’s a James Blake sample on 'REM'), and the music's spit-shined mastering job that recalls Rick Ross’s triumphant Rich Forever, the new King Remembered in Time doesn’t try to deliver on that promise. Instead of feeling like a definitive pinpointing of the spot K.R.I.T.’s at right now, King sounds more like a checkpoint halfway between where he’s been and where he wants to go."

On December 24, 2013, XXL named it the tenth best mixtape of the year, saying "the project again helped anchor K.R.I.T’s place in the rap game."

== Track listing ==
- All tracks produced by Big K.R.I.T. except Life Is A Gamble which is produced by 9th Wonder

No.	Title	Length
1.	"Purpose"	1:46
2.	"Shine On" (featuring Bun B)	3:49
3.	"Talkin Bout Nothing"	2:23
4.	"King Without a Crown"	2:50
5.	"R.E.M."	2:52
6.	"Meditate"	4:52
7.	"Serve This Royalty"	3:55
8.	"Good 2getha" (featuring Ashton Jones)	3:41
9.	"Just Last Week (Snippet)" (featuring Future)	1:42
10.	"My Trunk" (featuring Trinidad James)	3:45
11.	"How U Luv That" (featuring Big Sant)	3:03
12.	"Only One" (featuring Wiz Khalifa and Smoke DZA)	4:43
13.	"Banana Clip Theory"	3:38
14.	"Life Is a Gamble" (featuring BJ the Chicago Kid)	3:55
15.	"WTF"	4:34
16.	"Bigger Picture"	4:12
17.	"Multi Till The Sun Die"	3:56
Total length:		59:36
