= Christ Conscious =

2014 single by Joey Badass

Single by Joey Badass

from the album B4.Da.$$
- Released: September 30, 2014
- Genre: Hip hop
- Length: 2:53
- Label: Pro Era; Cinematic
- Songwriter: Jo-Vaughn Scott
- Producer: Basquiat

Joey Badass singles chronology
| "Bad Thing" (2014) | "Christ Conscious" (2014) | "No. 99" (2014) |

Music video
- "Christ Conscious" on YouTube

"Christ Conscious" is a song by American rapper Joey Badass, released on September 30, 2014 as the second single from his debut studio album B4.Da.$$ (2015). It was produced by Basquiat.

== Background ==
Joey Badass explained the concept of the song and its music video to MTV News: "That record to me is like, 'I'm here.' The whole idea of the song is, I'm building up, channeling my energy, getting stronger and stronger until one day I finally evolve. And that's what it is in the video: Me ascending to this next level." In that same interview, he revealed that he found the instrumental of the song on YouTube as a "Joey Bada$$ type beat", after which he began freestyling to it and decided to use it. In addition, he said it was one of his favorite records from B4.Da.$$.

== Composition ==
The song finds Joey Badass rapping in a boastful and threatening manner over a "minimal backdrop of faded beats", as well as delivering "clever similes and metaphors", double entedres and ad-libs, about how he "won't stop until he reaches 'Christ conscious'".

== Critical reception ==
"Christ Conscious" received positive reviews from music critics, particularly for Joey Badass' wordplay. Michelle Geslani of Consequence of Sound wrote, "If his slick and shrewd wordplay is any indication, Bada$$'s peers should be shaking in their Timbs." Kevin Goddard of HotNewHipHop wrote, "this grimey banger finds Joey showcasing his lyrical talents per usual, as he laces the track with some slick double entedres and serious rhymes." Writing for Exclaim!, Josiah Hughes described, "He doesn't exactly reinvent the wheel, offering another by-the-numbers Bada$$ track, but it's a formula that works in his favour."

== Music video ==
The official music video was released alongside the single. According to Joey Badass, he "visualized the whole video instantly" when he heard the track. Directed by MIE, the video shows Joey walking in the streets of Brooklyn as he raps, filled with special effects that illustrate his views and beliefs of the world. A mysterious purple matter follows him, forming "various writhing polygons". Joey Badass eventually arrives on a rooftop, after which the mysterious material allows him to levitate into space.

== Certifications ==
| Region | Certification | Certified units/sales |
|---|---|---|
| New Zealand (RMNZ) | Gold | 15,000^{‡} |
^{‡} Sales+streaming figures based on certification alone.
