= Cinematic Music Group =

American hip hop record label

- Parent company: Universal Music Group
- Founded: 2007; 19 years ago
- Founder: Jonny Shipes
- Distributor: Geffen
- Genre: Hip hop
- Country of origin: United States
- Location: New York City, New York
- Official website: cinematicworldwide.com

Cinematic Music Group is an American record label, management, publishing & touring company distributed by Geffen Records founded in 2007 by Jonny Shipes. Their roster as of 2020 consists of Joey Bada$$, Pro Era, T-Pain, Smoke DZA, Va$htie, Mick Jenkins, G Herbo, Caveman, Public Access TV, Flipp Dinero, and others.

In August 2023, Shipes sold Cinematic's recording catalogue to Interscope Geffen A&M and formed a new music company named GoodTalk.

== History ==
Cinematic Music Group made one of its earliest signings in 2007 with Harlem’s Smoke DZA. That same year, Cinematic signed Sean Kingston whose self-titled debut album included two #1 Billboard singles, including the double platinum "Beautiful Girls." The album sold in excess of 1,000,000 units. Cinematic’s next signee, West Coast MC Nipsey Hussle, signed to the company in 2010 and was included on XXL’s Annual Freshman List

In 2010, Shipes signed Big K.R.I.T., who that same year released his mixtape "Krit Wuz Here" KRIT followed up this success with his “Returnof4eva” mixtape in March 2011. K.R.I.T debuted the #1 hip hop album on the billboard charts with his debut album Live from the Underground.

In 2010, Cinematic added Vashtie Kola, an artist, designer, and DJ to the roster. Shipes then signed Joey Bada$$ & the collective Pro Era, short for the Progressive Era, which was a group of emcees, producers, and young tastemakers. Musical members of Pro Era include Joey Bada$$, Capital Steez, Kirk Knight, Nyck Caution, CJ Fly, Dessy Hinds, A La Sole, Chuck Strangers, Dyemond Lewis and more. After viewing a video of a 16-year-old Joey Bada$$ freestyling on popular hip hop and viral video website WorldstarHipHop.com, Shipes saw his potential. After writing for two years, Bada$$ released his debut mixtape “1999”, receiving critical acclaim from Complex Magazine. Bada$$ & Pro Era have been noted for their lyricism and return to the 90s sound.

In 2013, Shipes expanded the roster of Cinematic and signed indie R&B/electronic duo ASTR. ASTR released their “Varsity” EP in January 2014. On July 16, 2014, Cinematic Music Group President Jonny Shipes announced the signing of Chicago emcee Mick Jenkins whose "The Water[s]" album was released, and received a rave review from Stereogum. Jenkins finished off 2014 by touring the country (40 plus cities) on The Smoker's Club tour and saw his first headlining tour with Pro Era’s Kirk Knight in early 2015.

On January 20, 2015, Joey Bada$$ released his debut studio album “B4.DA.$$”. The album sold 56,000 units in its opening week, making it the #1 rap album in the country that week.

On September 1, 2015, Chicago rapper Lil Herb was added to the roster of Cinematic. His album, Ballin' Like I'm Kobe, was released on September 27, 2015.

On February 4, 2016, Cinematic announced the signing of Brooklyn rock band Caveman. Later that month on February 11, they announced the signing of New York City band Public Access TV.

In summer 2023 Shipes sold the Cinematic Music Group catalog to Interscope Geffen A&M in a deal reported to be worth eight figures, and launched a new venture, GoodTalk, a full-service entertainment company with divisions including talent management, a new record label, clothing and festivals verticals, and 4Lifers Entertainment, the film and TV production company he and Druski co-founded.

== Artists ==
Act	Year signed
Smoke DZA	2007
Joey Bada$$	2010
Pro Era	2010
Vashtie Kola	2010
Kirk Knight	2010
ASTR	2013
Mick Jenkins	2014
G Herbo	2015
Mobsquad Nard	2015
Cam'ron	2016
Caveman	2016
Public Access TV	2016
Splashh	2016
T-Pain	2016
Cat Clyde	2017
Yungeen Ace	2018
Lil Trevo	2018
Shawn Scrilla	2018
Flipp Dinero	2018
Slayter	2019
ABG Neal	2019
Nipsey Hussle	2010
Luh Kel	2019
BBG Kobe	2020
C Glizzy	2020
Xanman	2021

== Discography ==
Artist	Album	Details
Big K.R.I.T.	K.R.I.T. Wuz Here	Release date: May 3, 2010
Big K.R.I.T.	Return of 4Eva	Release date: March 28, 2011
Big K.R.I.T.	4eva N a Day	Release date: March 5, 2012
Joey Bada$$	1999	Release date: June 12, 2012
Pro Era	The Secc$ Tape	Release date: February 20, 2012
Pro Era	P.E.E.P: The aPROcalypse	Release date: Dec 21, 2012
Big K.R.I.T.	Live from the Underground	Release date: June 5, 2012
Big K.R.I.T.	King Remembered in Time	Release date: April 10, 2013
Joey Bada$$	Summer Knights	Release date: July 1, 2013
CJ Fly	Thee Way Eye See It	Release date: October 5, 2013
ASTR	Varsity EP	Release date: January 21, 2014
Pro Era	The Secc$ Tape 2	Release date: February 14, 2014
Pro Era	The Shift	Release date: May 27, 2014
Mick Jenkins	The Water[s]	Release date: August 12, 2014
Big K.R.I.T.	Cadillactica	Release date: November 11, 2014
Joey Badass	B4.Da.$$	Release date: January 20, 2015
Mick Jenkins	Wave[s]	Release date:August 21, 2015
G Herbo	Ballin Like I'm Kobe	Release date: September 29, 2015
Kirk Knight	Late Knight Special	Release date: October 30, 2015
Mobsquad Nard	Everything Clean But Da Ashtray	Release date: February 5, 2016
Mick Jenkins	The Healing Component	Release date: September 23, 2016
Joey Badass	All-Amerikkkan Badass	Release date: April 7, 2017
Yungeen Ace	Life of Betrayal	Release date: August 3, 2018
