= Kenneth Whalum =

American musician

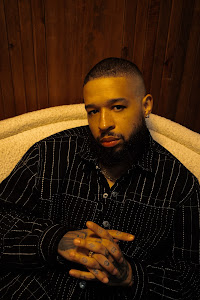
- Whalum in 2025

Background information
- Born: Memphis, Tennessee, U.S.
- Origin: Memphis, Tennessee, U.S.
- Education: Overton High School; Morehouse College; The New School (School of Jazz & Contemporary Music)
- Genres: Jazz; R&B; Alternative soul
- Occupations: Saxophonist; Singer; Songwriter; Composer
- Instruments: Saxophone; Vocals
- Years active: 2000s–present
- Label: Independent

Kenneth Whalum is an American saxophonist, singer, songwriter, and composer. He has released several solo albums and has recorded with artists including Jay-Z, Maxwell, Beyoncé, D’Angelo, Frank Ocean, and Mac Miller.

== Early life and education ==
Whalum attended Overton High School and Morehouse College, later graduating from the School of Jazz and Contemporary Music at The New School in 2008.

== Career ==
Whalum began his career performing with artists such as Al Green and Isaac Hayes. He played saxophone and arranged horns on Jay-Z's albums American Gangster (2007) and 4:44 (2017). He has also toured and recorded with Maxwell, Beyoncé, D’Angelo, Frank Ocean, and Mac Miller.

In 2011, Whalum performed in pianist Kris Bowers ensemble at the Jazz Gallery in New York City. A review in The New York Times praised the group's "ambition and phrasing" and noted Whalum's role in the ensemble's sound.

In 2014, Whalum contributed to Kris Bowers’ album Heroes + Misfits.

Whalum's song "Might Not Be OK," featuring Big K.R.I.T. drew national attention when K.R.I.T. performed its spoken-word verse at the 2016 BET Hip Hop Awards as a statement on racial injustice.

In 2014, Whalum played in a Big K.R.I.T. song called "Standby (Interlude)".

In 2025 amd 2026, Whalum performed with the Trey Anastasio Band.

On 18th October 2025, Whalum performed alongside Sabrina Carpenter in the songs Nobody's Son and Manchild during her appearance on Saturday Night Live.

== Solo work ==
Whalum released his debut album To Those Who Believe in 2010. A review in The Urban Music Scene described his saxophone playing as "nothing short of amazing" and compared its energy to John Coltrane.

His album Broken Land was released in 2017, followed by Broken Land 2 in 2021. Bearded Gentlemen Music described Broken Land 2 as "a bounty of mid-tempo grooves and slowed-down meditations" that resisted genre stereotypes. Atwood Magazine called the record "heavy, meaningful, and haunting."

== Musical style ==
Whalum has described his sound as "alternative soul." His music blends elements of jazz, R&B, gospel, and soul. The Washington Post noted that a 2013 performance at Bohemian Caverns evoked Coltrane's quartet while establishing its own character.

== Discography ==
=== As leader ===
- To Those Who Believe (2010)
- Broken Land (2017)
- Broken Land 2 (2021)

=== Selected singles ===
- "Might Not Be OK" (feat. Big K.R.I.T.) (2016)
- "One More Kiss"
- "Say Sorry" (2022)

=== As guest (selected) ===
- Jay-Z – American Gangster; 4:44 (2017)
- Maxwell (musician) – BLACKsummers'night
- Mac Miller – Swimming
- Beyoncé – Renaissance
