= Cadillactica =

Studio album by Big K.R.I.T.
- Released: November 10, 2014
- Recorded: 2012–2014
- Genre: Hip-hop
- Length: 56:10
- Labels: Cinematic; Def Jam
- Producers: Big K.R.I.T. (also exec.); Jonny Shipes (exec.); Sheldon "Dutch" John (co-exec.); Alex da Kid; DJ Dahi; DJ Khalil; Finatik & Zac; Jim Jonsin; Raphael Saadiq; Rico Love; Terrace Martin

Big K.R.I.T. chronology
King Remembered in Time (2013)	Cadillactica (2014)	4eva Is a Mighty Long Time (2017)

Singles from Cadillactica
- 1. "Pay Attention" Released: July 28, 2014; 2. "Cadillactica" Released: October 14, 2014; 3. "Soul Food" Released: October 28, 2014

Cadillactica is the second studio album by American rapper Big K.R.I.T. It was released on November 10, 2014, by Cinematic Music Group and Def Jam Recordings. The album features guest appearances from Raphael Saadiq, E-40, Wiz Khalifa, Kenneth Whalum III, Mara Hruby, Rico Love, Bun B, Devin the Dude, Big Sant, Jamie N Commons, Lupe Fiasco and ASAP Ferg.

The album debuted at number five on the US Billboard 200 and was supported by three singles: "Pay Attention", "Cadillactica" and "Soul Food". It was also met with widespread acclaim from critics who praised the soulful production and thoughtful lyrics, ending up on many end-of-year lists.

== Background ==
On June 13, 2013, in an interview with Dead End Hip Hop, Big K.R.I.T. hinted towards the title of the album, stating that the title is featured in the opening seconds of the Intro from his debut album Live from the Underground (2012). In August 2013, in an interview with HipHopDX, he spoke about what to expect from the album, saying: "I'm keeping it soulful, and I'm also really working with a lot of producers as well. [...] I'm used to being in front of the boards. I'm so used to mixing and so used to producing a record that sometimes it takes away from the creativity, or it takes me longer to create." In September 2013, he announced the title of the album Cadillactica.

In October 2013, in an interview with XXL, he spoke about how he came up with the album title, saying: "It's just one of those things that I was thinking about, 'cause in my first [album] cover Live From The Underground, it's a Cadillac that has crash landed on planet earth. Just the whole storyline of being able to take you in reverse of where the Cadillac comes from. It's creating this planet called Cadillactica where the soul and the funk comes from and being able to transcend my music with that idea." On September 23, 2014, he announced that the album would be released on November 11, 2014.

== Development ==
In an April 2014, interview with Nah Right, he elaborated on his involvement with the production of the album, saying: "Well, you know. I'm still involved. The beautiful thing is that I'm able to work with the type of musicians that I'm still able to give them my ideas. It could be a title or just the understanding of what I physically heard for the song that they can create or already have something in that manner."

In a September 2014, interview with Respect., he spoke about the vibe of the album, saying: "I wouldn't say that. Cadillactica is a free-floating album in a way where I felt like I was able to talk about whatever I wanted because I created a planet to do so. Cadillactica is a planet that I created, which in reality is my conscious mind. It's where all my creative thoughts come from."

== Release and promotion ==
On January 10, 2013, Big K.R.I.T. announced his next mixtape would be titled King Remembered in Time. King Remembered in Time would be released on April 10, 2013. The mixtape features primary production handled by K.R.I.T. himself and guest appearances by Wiz Khalifa, Future, Smoke DZA and Trinidad James among others.

In March 2014, he released seven songs over a week in promotion of the album. In an April 2014, interview with Nah Right, he was asked if any of the songs would make the album, saying: "Nah, all of those tracks that I put out there for K.R.I.T. Week were just for the people. I created those songs specifically for Week of K.R.I.T. Being able to have Rick Ross on it, A$AP Ferg and Smoke DZA, Big Sant [was great], but these were all songs I wanted to give to the people man." On September 16, 2014, he released the mixtape See Me On Top 4 in promotion of the album. The mixtape featured guest appearances from Rico Love, Yo Gotti, Big Sant, Rittz, ASAP Ferg and Rick Ross.

== Singles ==
On April 28, 2014, the album's first promotional single "Mt. Olympus" was released. On May 7, 2014, the music video was released for "Mt. Olympus". In an October 2014, interview he said he wrote "Mt. Olympus" one day after Kendrick Lamar's "Control" verse was released in August 2013, saying: "I wrote that song a day after the "Control" verse came out. It wouldn't have helped me to drop it then. I learned that this game is chess not checkers. I'm not going to jump you right after you jump me. I got to think about this." He also spoke about where the title "Mt. Olympus" came from, saying: "I named it "Mt. Olympus" because it's this rap god thing going on and I'm understand that Mt. Olympus is the place where all the gods kick it. So, I made it "Mt. Olympus" because I'm kicking it there."

On July 28, 2014, the album's first single "Pay Attention" featuring Rico Love was released. In a September 2014, interview with Respect., he spoke about how the lead single "Pay Attention" came about, saying: "I had the opportunity to go down to Miami and work with Jim Jonsin and his team of producers, Zac and Finatik. Also, at the same time I wanted to be able to get in with Rico Wade and work because Jim Jonsin and Rico have this musical relationship where it's cohesive and they work in a way that's organic and it was a blessing to be able to go down there and get in the studio with both of them and create a song of that nature."

On October 14, 2014, the album's second single "Cadillactica" was released. On October 15, 2014, the music video was released for "Pay Attention" featuring Rico Love. On October 28, 2014, the album's third single "Soul Food" featuring Raphael Saadiq was released. On November 5, 2014, the music video was released for "Cadillactica". On December 12, 2014. the music video was released for "Soul Food" featuring Raphael Saadiq.

== Critical reception ==
Professional ratings
Aggregate scores
Source	Rating
Metacritic	88/100
Review scores
Source	Rating
AbsolutePunk	7.8/10
AllMusic	4.5/5 stars
Billboard	4.5/5 stars
Consequence of Sound	B+
Exclaim!	8/10
HipHopDX	4.5/5
Pitchfork	7.5/10
The Plain Dealer	A−
PopMatters	9/10
XXL	4/5

Cadillactica received widespread acclaim from critics. At Metacritic, which assigns a normalized rating out of 100 to reviews from mainstream publications, the album received an average score of 88, based on 11 reviews. AllMusic's David Jeffries said, "Like David Banner before him, Meridian, Mississippi rapper Big K.R.I.T. was baptized in deep Southern slop and then cut through the competition with a bit of an indie spin, but Cadillactica is on another level, and if the album cover makes it looks like one of Kid Cudi's space jams, there's good reason." Samantha O’Connor of Exclaim! stated, "Big K.R.I.T.'s second major label album, Cadillactica, surpasses the rudimentary purpose of filling his sophomore album slot, sending fans swirling through a textured orbit of flavourful production and detailed storytelling. The Mississippi rapper has created a 17-track modern southern-style fairy-tale that catapults K.R.I.T. into a new tier of artistic relevancy and, following an arguably lacklustre year in hip-hop, fills a void." Jay Balfour of HipHopDX said, "Without leaning back he's smartly pushing against himself by enlisting Dahi and Raphael Saadiq and Terrace Martin. There's a conscious move into original music and instrumentation here that hints at where K.R.I.T. is heading, as well. With Cadillactica he's found his stride by taking new steps."

Rachel Chesbrough of XXL stated, "In some ways Cadillactica is the Big K.R.I.T. we already know. He's fearless in his content; unafraid to talk about (and even equate) both the material and the philosophical. It's The South 'til death, and underground at that. [...] Even without much mainstream appeal, K.R.I.T.'S relatability keeps it accessible, and ultimately, Cadillactica proves to be something the game barely knew it needed. Consider the gauntlet thrown." Michael Madden of Consequence of Sound said, "What makes Cadillactica arguably his best full-length to date is that he's never sounded more determined to chart every foot – or every layer of atmosphere – in between." Logan Smithson of PopMatters stated, "Cadillactica stands on its own as a deviation in sound but a continuation of greatness. An intriguing concept, exceptional production, and captivating lyricism ensure that a trip to Cadillactica is one that will stick with you for life."

== Commercial performance ==
The album debuted at number five on the US Billboard 200, with sales of 44,000 copies in the United States. In second week, the album dropped to number 43 on the chart, selling 9,000 copies, bringing its total album sales to 53,000 copies.

== Accolades ==
Publication/Author	Accolade	Rank	Ref.
Billboard	Ten Best Rap Albums of 2014	8	
Complex	50 Best Albums of 2014	23	
Consequence of Sound	Top 50 Albums of 2014	46	
Spin	40 Best Hip-Hop Albums of 2014	21	
Stereogum	40 Best Rap Albums of 2014	26	
Vibe	46 Best Albums of 2014	5	

== Track listing ==
No.	Title	Writer(s)	Producer(s)	Length
1.	"Kreation (Intro)"	Justin Scott	Big K.R.I.T.	3:20
2.	"Life"	Scott	Big K.R.I.T.	3:30
3.	"My Sub Pt. 3 (Big Bang)"	Scott	Big K.R.I.T.	3:11
4.	"Cadillactica"	Scott; Dacoury Natche; Khalil Abdul-Rahman	DJ Dahi; DJ Khalil	4:28
5.	"Soul Food" (featuring Raphael Saadiq)	Scott; Raphael Saadiq; Mark Summers	Saadiq	3:48
6.	"Pay Attention" (featuring Rico Love)	Scott; James Scheffer; Michael Mule; Isaac Deboni; Michael Burman; Rico Love	Jim Jonsin; Finatik N Zac; Rico Love	4:10
7.	"King of the South"	Scott	Big K.R.I.T.	3:32
8.	"Mind Control" (featuring E-40 and Wiz Khalifa)	Scott; Earl Stevens; Cameron Thomaz	Big K.R.I.T.	4:05
9.	"Standby (Interlude)"	Scott	Big K.R.I.T.	1:39
10.	"Do You Love Me" (featuring Mara Hruby)	Scott; Eddie Harris	Big K.R.I.T.	3:48
11.	"Third Eye"	Scot; Natche	DJ Dahi	4:00
12.	"Mo Better Cool" (featuring Devin the Dude, Big Sant and Bun B)	Scott; Sauntiago Gathright; Bernard Freeman; Devin Copeland; Barry White	Big K.R.I.T.	4:46
13.	"Angels"	Scott; Terrace Martin	Martin	3:46
14.	"Saturdays = Celebration" (featuring Jamie N Commons)	Scott; Alexander Grant	Big K.R.I.T.; Alex da Kid	4:14
15.	"Lost Generation" (featuring Lupe Fiasco)	Scott; Wasalu Jaco	Big K.R.I.T.	3:57

Deluxe edition (bonus tracks)
No.	Title	Writer(s)	Producer(s)	Length
16.	"Mt. Olympus (Reprise)"	Scott; Natche	DJ Dahi	4:11
17.	"Lac Lac" (featuring A$AP Ferg)	Scott; Darold Ferguson	Big K.R.I.T.	5:32

Best Buy deluxe edition bonus track
No.	Title	Writer(s)	Producer(s)	Length
18.	"Let It Show"	Scott; Natche	DJ Dahi	3:02

== Charts ==
=== Weekly charts ===
Chart (2014)	Peak position
US Billboard 200	5
US Top R&B/Hip-Hop Albums (Billboard)	1
US Indie Store Album Sales (Billboard)	14

=== Year-end charts ===
Chart (2014)	Position
US Top R&B/Hip-Hop Albums (Billboard)	70
Chart (2015)	Position
US Top R&B/Hip-Hop Albums (Billboard)	83
