= Vashtie Kola =

American music video director, disc jockey and designer

- Born: April 23, 1981 (age 45); Albany, New York, U.S.
- Education: School of Visual Arts
- Occupations: Creative director, film director, DJ
- Years active: 1999–present
- Website: Official website

Vashtie Kola (often stylized as Va$htie; born April 23, 1981) is an American music video director, filmmaker, artist, designer, creative consultant and disc jockey. She has been active in the downtown New York City scene for over a decade.

== Early life and education ==
She moved from Albany to New York City in 1999 to study film at the School of Visual Arts, graduating in 2004. During this time, she worked at Stüssy, a clothing store.

== Career ==
In 2010, she modelled for Rachel Roy's spring lookbook. Later that year, she became the first woman to design Nike Air Jordan sneakers. Publications including Women's Wear Daily, Footwear News, TeenVogue.Com, Complex, and The Source covered the occasion. In 2011, The New York Times did a feature on Kola.

In 2015, Kola wrote, directed and starred in an art film for Drake's Hotline Bling video. She also starred in the reality documentary television series 3AM, which aired for seven episodes on Showtime.

== Videography ==
=== 2005 ===
- Beans - "Papercut"
- Tony Hussle - "Come Again"

=== 2007 ===
- Child Rebel Soldier - "Us Placers"
- Armand Van Helden - "I Want Your Soul"
- J-Status featuring Shontelle & Rihanna - "Roll It"

=== 2008 ===
- Slim featuring Ryan Leslie & Fabolous - "Good Lovin'"
- KiD CuDi - "Heaven At Nite"

=== 2009 ===
- Solange - "T.O.N.Y."
- Yung L.A. - "Futuristic Love (Elroy)"
- Justin Bieber - "One Time"
- Junior Sanchez featuring Joel Madden & Benji Madden - "Elevator"
- Jadakiss - "Letter to B.I.G."

=== 2010 ===
- Theophilus London - "I Want You (Marvin Gaye Cover)"
- Curt@!n$ - "EXODUS"
- Jasmine Solano – "That's Not It"

=== 2011 ===
- Kendrick Lamar - "A.D.H.D"

=== 2012 ===
- Big K.R.I.T. - "Boobie Miles"
- Big K.R.I.T. - "Insomnia"
- Joey Bada$$ - "Waves"
- Gym Class Heroes - "Martyrial Girl$"

=== 2015 ===
- Drake - "Hotline Bling (Art Version)"
- 3AM (TV Series)
