= 4eva Is a Mighty Long Time =

Studio album by Big K.R.I.T.
- Released: October 27, 2017
- Genre: Southern hip hop
- Length: 84:48
- Label: Multi Alumni; BMG
- Producer: Bekon; Big K.R.I.T.; Cory Mo; DJ Khalil; Hey DJ; Mannie Fresh; Organized Noize; Robert Glasper; Rogét Chahayed; Supah Mario; Terrace Martin; WLPWR

Big K.R.I.T. chronology
Cadillactica (2014)	4eva Is a Mighty Long Time (2017)	K.R.I.T. Iz Here (2019)

Disc two cover

Singles from 4eva Is a Mighty Long Time
- 1. "Confetti" Released: September 28, 2017; 2. "Keep the Devil Off" Released: October 6, 2017; 3. "Aux Cord" Released: October 20, 2017; 4. "1999" Released: February 6, 2018

4eva Is a Mighty Long Time is the third studio album by American rapper Big K.R.I.T., released on October 27, 2017, through Multi Alumni and BMG Rights Management. A double album, it is his first full-length release since his departure from Def Jam in 2016. The album features guest appearances from T.I., Lloyd, Bun B, Pimp C, CeeLo Green, Sleepy Brown, Joi, Jill Scott, Keyon Harrold, Bilal, Robert Glasper, Kenneth Whalum and Burniss Earl Travis II.

4eva Is a Mighty Long Time was supported by four singles: "Confetti", "Keep the Devil Off", "Aux Cord" and "1999". The album charted at number seven on the US Billboard 200, and received generally positive reviews from critics.

== Singles ==
The album's first single, "Confetti", was released on September 28, 2017. The album's second single, "Keep the Devil Off", was released on October 6, 2017. The album's third single, "Aux Cord", was released on October 20, 2017. The album's fourth single, "1999" featuring Lloyd, was released to urban contemporary radio on February 6, 2018.

== Critical reception ==
Professional ratings
Aggregate scores
Source	Rating
AnyDecentMusic?	7.2/10
Metacritic	80/100
Review scores
Source	Rating
AllMusic	3.5/5 stars
The A.V. Club	B
Exclaim!	8/10
HipHopDX	4.3/5
HotNewHipHop	84%
Pitchfork	7.3/10
RapReviews	9/10
XXL	4/5

4eva Is a Mighty Long Time was met with generally positive reviews. At Metacritic, which assigns a normalized rating out of 100 to reviews from mainstream publications, the album received an average score of 80, based on seven reviews. Aggregator AnyDecentMusic? gave it 7.2 out of 10, based on their assessment of the critical consensus.

Emanuel Wallace of RapReviews gave the album a near perfect score, stating "Big K.R.I.T. does a good job of separating the two personas at the end of the day. If the album was about 5 or 6 minutes shorter, it could have fit on a single disc but perhaps at the expense of the narrative. The double disc format really helps to drive home the point when the listener wants to switch from Big K.R.I.T.'s "Get Away" to Justin Scott's "Keep the Devil Off"". Aaron McKrell of HipHopDX gave a positive review, stating "It does highlight Justin Scott and Big K.R.I.T. in their truest essence; spiritual, witty, and loyal to Mississippi, with overly soulful, southern production. Thanks to 4eva Is a Mighty Long Time, Justin Scott has once and for all ensured that his musical legacy is worth remembering". Kyle Mullin of Exclaim! stated: "There are plenty of other highlights to be raved about in 4eva Is a Mighty Long Time's massive tracklist. Do yourself a favour: pick up this LP and immerse yourself not only in its impressive breadth, but also its practically unparalleled depth."

Clayton Purdom of The A.V. Club said, "The tough, chest-beating first disc gives way to a second disc that's just a little too fond of syrupy interludes. But as with his other releases, K.R.I.T.'s signature sincerity reigns supreme". Matthew Ismael Ruiz of Pitchfork noted, "Subwoofers are admittedly very cool, but by volume 4 ("Subenstein (My Sub IV)") of K.R.I.T.'s magnum opus of adulation for the bass speakers, the conceit has worn a little thin. Still bumps, though". Paul Simpson of AllMusic wrote: "4eva Is a Mighty Long Time is a mighty long album, at 20 songs and two brief skits, but K.R.I.T. clearly has a lot to say, and he expresses it with vigor and passion on this ambitious work."

=== Year-end lists ===
Select year-end rankings of 4eva Is a Mighty Long Time
Publication	List	Rank	Ref.
Billboard	50 Best Albums of 2017	47	
Clash	Albums of the Year 2017	35	
Exclaim!	Top 10 Hip-Hop Albums of 2017	9	
HipHopDX	Best Rap Albums of 2017	6	
Rolling Stone	40 Best Rap Albums of 2017	25	

== Commercial performance ==
4eva Is a Mighty Long Time debuted at number seven on the US Billboard 200 with 33,000 album-equivalent units, of which 21,000 were pure album sales. In its second week, the album fell short to number 45 on the US Billboard 200, selling 12,000 equivalent album units (of that sum, 5,000 were pure album sales).

== Track listing ==
Disc one: Big K.R.I.T.
No.	Title	Writer(s)	Producer(s)	Length
1.	"Big K.R.I.T."	Justin Scott; Rolynne Anderson; Khalil Abdul-Rahman; Sam Barsh; Daniel Seeff; Daniel Tannenbaum	Big K.R.I.T.	2:52
2.	"Confetti"	Scott; Darhyl Camper, Jr.	Hey DJ	3:18
3.	"Big Bank" (featuring T.I.)	Scott; Clifford Harris; William Washington; Willie Hutchison^{[a]}	Big K.R.I.T.; WLPWR	3:44
4.	"Subenstein (My Sub IV)"	Scott; Marlon Goodwin; Premro Smith; Byron Thomas	Mannie Fresh	4:03
5.	"1999" (featuring Lloyd)	Scott; Lloyd Polite; Thomas; Timothy Gatling^{[b]}; Gene Griffin^{[b]}; Aaron Hall^{[b]}; Edward Riley^{[b]}	Mannie Fresh	3:42
6.	"Ride wit Me" (featuring Bun B and Pimp C)	Scott; Bernard Freeman; Chad Butler; Cory Moore; Raymond Murray	Cory Mo; Organized Noize	3:34
7.	"Get Up 2 Come Down" (featuring CeeLo Green and Sleepy Brown)	Scott; Thomas Calloway; Patrick Brown; Keyon Harrold; Michael Hartnett; Washington	WLPWR	4:37
8.	"Layup"	Scott	Big K.R.I.T.	4:20
9.	"Classic Interlude"	Scott		0:53
10.	"Aux Cord"	Scott; Nikisha Grier; Barsh; Paul Intson; Seeff; Abdul-Rahman; Rogét Chahayed	DJ Khalil; Chahayed	3:15
11.	"Get Away"	Scott; Anderson; Bettye Crutcher^{[c]}	Big K.R.I.T.	4:57
Total length:				39:15

Disc two: Justin Scott
No.	Title	Writer(s)	Producer(s)	Length
1.	"Justin Scott"	Scott; Anderson; Barsh; Kyle Crane; Seeff; Tannenbaum; Abdul-Rahman	DJ Khalil	4:00
2.	"Mixed Messages"	Scott; Jonathan Priester; Ernest Calabria^{[d]}; Barbara Massey^{[d]}	Supah Mario	4:26
3.	"Keep the Devil Off"	Scott; Grier; Hartnett; Willie Jacks; Ryan Kilgore; Lance Powlis; Washington; Joseph Jefferson^{[e]}	Big K.R.I.T.; WLPWR	5:10
4.	"Miss Georgia Fornia" (featuring Joi)	Scott; Joi Elaine Gilliam; Hartnett; Douglas Whatley, Jr.; Tannenbaum	Bekon; DJ Khalil	6:00
5.	"Everlasting"	Scott; Hartnett; Washington	WLPWR	3:23
6.	"Higher Calling" (featuring Jill Scott)	Scott; Jill Scott; Priester; Adam Feeney^{[f]}	Supah Mario	3:53
7.	"Weekend Interlude"	Scott	Big K.R.I.T.	0:48
8.	"Price of Fame"	Scott; Washington	WLPWR	4:14
9.	"Drinking Sessions" (featuring Keyon Harrold)	Scott; Harrold; David Ruffin^{[g]}	Big K.R.I.T.	5:11
10.	"The Light" (featuring Bilal, Robert Glasper Jr., Kenneth Whalum and Burniss Earl Travis II)	Scott; Bilal Oliver; Robert Glasper; Kenneth Whalum; Burniss Travis II; Anderson; Jamire Williams	Big K.R.I.T.; Glasper; Terrace Martin	4:04
11.	"Bury Me in Gold"	Scott; Barsh; Intson; Seeff; Abdul-Rahman; Chahayed	DJ Khalil; Chahayed	4:24
Total length:				45:33

Track notes

- "Big K.R.I.T.", "Get Away", and "The Light" features additional vocals by Rolynne Anderson
- "Subenstein (My Sub IV)" features vocals by Shanell
- "Aux Cord" and "Keep the Devil Off" features vocals by Nikki Grier
- "Justin Scott" features additional vocals by Rolynne Anderson and John Morris Jr.
- "Keep the Devil Off" is stylized as "Keep the devil Off" throughout the album artwork and promotional material
- "Bury Me In Gold" features additional vocals by Angie Fisher, Jason Morales, and Nikki Greer

Sample credits

- ^{^[a]} "Big Bank" contains elements from "Tell Me Why Has Our Love Turned Cold", written and performed by Willie Hutch.
- ^{^[b]} "1999" contains elements from "Piece of My Love", written by Timothy Gatling, Gene Griffin, Aaron Hall, and Edward Riley, as performed by Guy.
- ^{^[c]} "Get Away" contains elements from "Sleepy People", written and performed by Bettye Crutcher.
- ^{^[d]} "Mixed Messages" contains elements from "Searching the Circle", written by Ernest Calabria and Barbara Massey, as performed by Barbara & Ernest.
- ^{^[e]} "Keep the Devil Off" contains elements from "Laugh to Keep from Crying", written by Joseph Jefferson and performed by Nat Turner Rebellion.
- ^{^[f]} "Higher Calling" contains elements from "13 Gangbanglul", written and performed by Frank Dukes.
- ^{^[g]} "Drinking Sessions" contains elements from "I Let Love Slip Away", written and performed by David Ruffin.

== Personnel ==
Credits adapted from the album's liner notes.

Performers

- Big K.R.I.T. – primary artist
- T.I. – featured artist (track 3)
- Lloyd – featured artist (track 5)
- Bun B – featured artist (track 6)
- Pimp C – featured artist (track 6)
- CeeLo Green – featured artist (track 7)
- Sleepy Brown – featured artist (track 7)
- Joi – featured artist (track 15)
- Jill Scott – featured artist (track 17)
- Keyon Harrold – featured artist (track 20)
- Bilal – featured artist (track 21)
- Robert Glasper – featured artist (track 21)
- Kenneth Whalum – featured artist (track 21)
- Burniss Earl Travis II – featured artist (track 21)

Instruments

- Markeith Black – guitar (tracks 1, 11, 19)
- DeJuan McCrimmon – keyboards (tracks 1, 19), piano (track 20)
- DJ Wally Sparks – scratching (track 4)
- Sharod Allen – guitar (tracks 6, 8)
- William Washington – bass guitar (tracks 7, 14)
- Mike Hartnett – guitar (tracks 7, 15), bass guitar (tracks 14, 16)
- Keyon Harrold – trumpet (track 7)
- Chin Injeti – bass (tracks 10, 22), guitar (track 10)
- Rogét Chahayed – keyboards (tracks 10, 22)
- Sam Barsh – keyboards (tracks 10, 12, 22), trumpet (track 10)
- Daniel Seeff – saxophone (track 10), bass guitar (tracks 12, 22)
- Kyle Crane – drums (track 12)
- Daniel Tannenbaum – strings (tracks 12, 15)
- Shedrick Mitchell – organ (track 14)
- Ryan Kilgore – saxophone (track 14)
- Willie Jacks – trombone (track 14)
- Lance Powlis – trumpet (track 14)
- D Whatley – keyboards (track 15)
- Jamire Williams – drums (track 21)
- Robert Glasper – piano (track 21)
- Kenneth Whalum – saxophone (track 21)
- Burniss Earl Travis II – double bass (track 21)

Production

- Big K.R.I.T. – producer (tracks 1, 3, 8, 11, 14, 18, 20, 21)
- Hey DJ – producer (track 2)
- WLPWR – producer (tracks 3, 7, 14, 16, 19)
- Mannie Fresh – producer (tracks 4, 5)
- Cory Mo – producer (track 6)
- Organized Noize – producer (track 6)
- DJ Khalil – producer (tracks 10, 12, 15, 22)
- Rogét Chahayed – producer (tracks 10, 22)
- Supah Mario – producer (tracks 13, 17)
- Bekon – producer (track 15)
- Robert Glasper – producer (track 21)
- Terrace Martin – producer (track 21)

== Charts ==
Chart performance for 4eva Is a Mighty Long Time
Chart (2017)	Peak position
US Billboard 200	7
US Top R&B/Hip-Hop Albums (Billboard)	5
