= Country Shit =

Song by Big K.R.I.T.

Single by Big K.R.I.T.

from the album K.R.I.T. Wuz Here
- Released: September 28, 2010
- Recorded: 2010
- Genre: Hip hop, Southern hip hop
- Length: 3:15
- Label: Island Def Jam
- Songwriters: Christopher Bridges, Bernard Freeman, Kenneth Gamble, Leon Huff, Justin L Scott

Big K.R.I.T. singles chronology
"Country Shit" (2010)	"Moon & Stars (Remix)" (2011)

"Country Shit" is a song by rapper Big K.R.I.T. The remix features rappers Ludacris and Bun B. The song was released as the lead single off Big K.R.I.T.'s mixtape "Krit Wuz Here". "Country Shit" charted on Billboard charts after the remix was released.

== Remix ==
"Country Shit (Remix)"

Single by Big K.R.I.T. featuring Ludacris and Bun B

from the album Return of 4Eva
- Released: May 17, 2011
- Recorded: 2011
- Genre: Hip hop Southern hip hop
- Length: 4:02
- Label: Island Def Jam
- Songwriters: Christopher Bridges, Bernard Freeman, Kenneth Gamble, Leon Huff, Justin L Scott

Big K.R.I.T. singles chronology
"Money On The Floor" (2011)	"Country Shit (Remix)" (2011)	"I'm Flexin'" (2011)

Ludacris singles chronology
"Welcome to My Hood (Remix)" (2011)	"Country Shit (Remix)" (2011)	"Little Bad Girl" (2011)

Bun B singles chronology
"What Yo Name Iz (Remix)" (2011)	"Country Shit (Remix)" (2011)	"Big Beast" (2012)

The official remix of the song features rappers Ludacris and Bun B. The remix was released to iTunes on May 17, 2011 and to radio on May 30, 2011.

== Music video ==
On June 11, 2011 the music video for the remix featuring Texas rapper Bun B and Georgia rapper Ludacris was released. The music video features a cameo appearance by Chamillionaire. The music video was shot in Mississippi; Atlanta, Georgia, and Port Arthur, Texas.

== Track listing ==
Digital single

No.	Title	Length
1.	"Country Shit (Remix)" (featuring Ludacris and Bun B)	4:02

Remix Digital single

No.	Title	Length
1.	"Country Shit" (featuring Ludacris and Bun B)	3:15

== Charts ==
Chart (2011)	Peak position
US R&B/Hip-Hop Songs (Billboard)	50
US Hot Rap Tracks (Billboard)	23

== Certifications ==
Region	Certification	Certified units/sales
United States (RIAA)	Gold	500,000^{‡}
^{‡} Sales+streaming figures based on certification alone.

== Release information ==
=== Purchasable Release ===
Country	Date	Format	Label	Ref
United States	September 28, 2010	Digital download	Cinematic Music Group, Def Jam	
United States	May 17, 2011	Digital download	Cinematic Music Group, Def Jam	The Remix
United States	May 30, 2011	radio airplay	Cinematic Music Group, Def Jam	The Remix
