= K.R.I.T. Iz Here =

Studio album by Big K.R.I.T.
- Released: July 12, 2019
- Genre: Southern hip hop
- Length: 56:45
- Label: BMG; Multi Alumni
- Producer: Danja; DJ Camper; DJ Khalil; Don Corleon; Ervin Garcia; Grant Strumwasser; Luke Witherspoon; M Millz; Mark Byrd; Mike Hector; Musik Major X; Panford Nabeyin; Qkaution; Reuel Ethan; Rico Love; Rolynne Anderson; Tae Beast; Tariq Beats; Uni; Wallis Lane; Wolfe De Mchls

Big K.R.I.T. chronology
TDT (2019)	K.R.I.T. Iz Here (2019)	Digital Roses Don't Die (2022)

Singles from K.R.I.T. Iz Here
- 1. "Learned From Texas" Released: June 1, 2019; 2. "K.R.I.T. Here" Released: June 7, 2019; 3. "Addiction" Released: June 24, 2019

K.R.I.T. Iz Here is the fourth studio album by American rapper Big K.R.I.T., released on July 12, 2019, by BMG Rights Management and Multi Alumni. It follows the release of his 2017 album 4eva Is a Mighty Long Time, and is a sequel to his 2010 mixtape K.R.I.T. Wuz Here. It featured guest appearances from Lil Wayne, Saweetie, Rico Love, Yella Beezy, J. Cole and Baby Rose, among others.

== Background ==
Big K.R.I.T. announced the release of the album alongside a single on June 7, 2019. A single, "K.R.I.T. Here", was released the same day. The second single, "Addiction" featuring Lil Wayne and Saweetie, was released on June 24.

== Critical reception ==
Professional ratings
Aggregate scores
Source	Rating
Metacritic	69/100
Review scores
Source	Rating
AllMusic	3.5/5 stars
HipHopDX	3.7/5
No Ripcord	4/10
Pitchfork	6.8/10

K.R.I.T. Iz Here was met with generally positive reviews. At Metacritic, which assigns a normalized rating out of 100 to reviews from professional publications, the album received an average score of 69, based on four reviews.

Evan Rytlewski of Pitchfork described Big K.R.I.T. as "almost incapable of making a song that's anything less than perfectly fine", continuing: "K.R.I.T. Iz Here might have been better off if K.R.I.T. had availed himself of a few swings and misses". Writing on HipHopDX, Daniel Spielberger labelled the album as "neither a career-defining album nor a complete flop", also commenting "K.R.I.T. is on auto-pilot".

== Track listing ==
Credits adapted from Tidal.

No.	Title	Writer(s)	Producer(s)	Length
1.	"K.R.I.T. Here"	Justin Scott; Darhyl Camper, Jr.; Marvin Winans	DJ Camper	3:21
2.	"High End Country (Interlude)"	Scott		0:47
3.	"I Been Waitin"	Scott; Quinton Lamar Cook; Reuel E. Walker	Musik Major X; Reuel Ethan	2:27
4.	"Make It Easy"	Scott; Camper; Burt Bacharach; Hal David	DJ Camper; Luke Witherspoon	2:52
5.	"Addiction" (featuring Lil Wayne and Saweetie)	Scott; Dwayne Carter; Diamonté Harper; Richard Butler, Jr.; Donovan Bennett	Rico Love; Don Corleon	2:50
6.	"Energy"	Scott; Butler, Jr.; Nathaniel Hills; Jill Scott; Marcella Araica; Keith Pelzer	Rico Love; Danja	3:15
7.	"Obvious" (featuring Rico Love)	Scott; Hills; Marcus Mills; Quentin Hills; Butler, Jr.	Danja; M Millz; Qkaution	3:24
8.	"I Made" (featuring Yella Beezy)	Scott; Mike Hector; Grant Strumwasser; Darius Roberts; Conway Markies; Nima Jahanbin; Paimon Jahanbin	Grant Strumwasser; Mike Hector; Wallis Lane	2:28
9.	"Everytime" (featuring Baby Rose)	Scott; Ervin Garcia; Aaron Goldstein; Argaw Belay Jr.; James Wrighter; Jasmine Wilson; N. Jahanbin; P. Jahanbin; Panford Nabeyin	Ervin Garcia; Nabeyin; Uni; Lane	3:52
10.	"Believe"	Scott; Marcus Mills; James Harris III; Terry Lewis; Butler, Jr.	Rico Love; M Millz	2:46
11.	"Prove It" (featuring J. Cole)	Scott; Jermaine Cole; Everett Young; Russell Ferrante	Wolfe De Mchls	3:22
12.	"Family Matters"	Scott; Young; Donald Degrate	Wolfe De Mchls	3:16
13.	"Blue Flame (Interlude)"	Scott		0:27
14.	"Blue Flame Ballet"	Scott; Rolynne Anderson	Rolynne Anderson	3:29
15.	"Learned from Texas"	Scott; Khalil Abdul-Rahman; Altariq Crapps; Daniel Tannenbaum	DJ Khalil; Tariq Beats	3:13
16.	"Outer Space"	Scott; Donte Perkins	Tae Beast	3:01
17.	"High Beams" (featuring Wolfe de Mçhls)	Scott; Young; Ian Ruhala	Wolfe De Mchls	3:44
18.	"Life in the Sun" (featuring Camper)	Scott; Darhyl Camper Jr.; Mark Byrd	Mark Byrd	3:03
19.	"M.I.S.S.I.S.S.I.P.P.I."	Scott; Hills	Danja	5:08
Total length:				56:45

== Charts ==
Chart (2019)	Peak position
US Billboard 200	16
