= Live from the Underground =

Studio album by Big K.R.I.T.
- Released: June 5, 2012
- Recorded: 2010–2012
- Genre: Hip-hop
- Length: 58:28
- Labels: Cinematic; Def Jam
- Producers: Big K.R.I.T. (also exec.); Sha Money XL (exec.)

Big K.R.I.T. chronology
4eva N a Day (2012)	Live from the Underground (2012)	King Remembered in Time (2013)

Singles from Live from the Underground
- 1. "Money on the Floor" Released: October 24, 2011; 2. "I Got This" Released: March 21, 2012; 3. "Yeah Dat's Me" Released: May 20, 2012; 4. "What U Mean" Released: July 29, 2012

Live from the Underground is the debut studio album by American rapper and record producer Big K.R.I.T. It was released on June 5, 2012, by Cinematic Music Group and Def Jam Recordings. As one of the executive producers on the album, Big K.R.I.T. did the production work for the entirety of the project. The album was supported by four singles: "Money on the Floor", "I Got This", "Yeah Dat's Me", and "What U Mean".

== Critical reception ==
Professional ratings
Aggregate scores
Source	Rating
AnyDecentMusic?	6.8/10
Metacritic	78/100
Review scores
Source	Rating
AllHipHop	8.5/10
AllMusic	3.5/5 stars
The A.V. Club	B−
Consequence of Sound	C+
Entertainment Weekly	A−
Rolling Stone	3.5/5 stars
Spin	8/10
Sputnikmusic	3/5
XXL	4/5

Live from the Underground received generally positive reviews from critics. At Metacritic, which assigns a normalized rating out of 100 to reviews from mainstream publications, the album received an average score of 78, based on 23 reviews.

Adam Fleischer of XXL praised Big K.R.I.T. for maintaining his "traditionalist Southern aesthetic" and "nuanced sociopolitical themes" from his mixtapes and giving the tracks "a grounded sonic variety" of "sounds [are] individually diverse but complementary on the whole", concluding that: "In a time of formulaic approaches to club and radio hits, Big K.R.I.T. is navigating a space of bluesy Southern hip-hop like no artist in recent memory. With Live from the Underground, through deeply authentic takes on his own life and surroundings, the 2011 XXL Freshman has found a way to create some of the most resonating, least selfish rap music around." Kyle Anderson of Entertainment Weekly wrote that: "With its feral lyrical hunger and playful production, Live From the Underground is the best distillation of the South since OutKast's rule-rewriting heyday." AllMusic's David Jeffries gave praise to K.R.I.T. for "keeping quality control at top level" on his debut album by crafting "impeccable" beats and having a "precise and commanding" flow that sells "his exploration of major-label life ("I Got This", "My Sub")" while also delivering "some surprising pop experiments ("If I Fall", "Praying Man"), concluding that: "Live from the Underground winds up both an easy introduction to the man's talents and a crowd-pleasing effort with no stale sell-out aftertaste. He could have gone deeper, but this is certainly deep enough."

Spin named Live from the Underground the eleventh best hip hop album of 2012.

== Commercial performance ==
Live from the Underground debuted at number five on the US Billboard 200, with first-week sales of 41,000 copies in the United States. As of August 2012, the album sold 83,000 copies in the United States.

== Track listing ==
- All tracks produced by Big K.R.I.T.

No.	Title	Writer(s)	Length
1.	"LFU300MA (Intro)"	Justin Scott	2:13
2.	"Live from the Underground"	Scott	3:40
3.	"Cool 2 Be Southern"	Scott	3:22
4.	"I Got This"	Scott; Willie Hutch	3:22
5.	"Money on the Floor" (featuring 8Ball & MJG and 2 Chainz)	Scott; Premro Smith; Marlon Goodwin; Tauheed Epps	4:07
6.	"What U Mean" (featuring Ludacris)	Scott; Christopher Bridges	3:56
7.	"My Sub (Pt. 2: The Jackin')"	Scott	4:11
8.	"Don't Let Me Down"	Scott	2:57
9.	"Porchlight" (featuring Anthony Hamilton)	Scott; Anthony Hamilton; Ronald LaPread; Lionel Richie	3:48
10.	"Pull Up" (featuring Big Sant and Bun B)	Scott; Bernard Freeman; Santiaugo "Big Sant" Gathright	4:01
11.	"Yeah Dat's Me"	Scott; Bobby Womack	3:25
12.	"Hydroplaning" (featuring Devin the Dude)	Scott; Devin Copeland	4:01
13.	"If I Fall" (featuring Melanie Fiona)	Scott	2:56
14.	"Rich Dad, Poor Dad"	Scott	3:06
15.	"Praying Man" (featuring B.B. King)	Scott	4:21
16.	"Live from the Underground (Reprise)" (featuring Ms. Linnie)	Scott	4:53
Total length:			58:28

== Personnel ==
Credits for Live from the Underground adapted from AllMusic.

- 2 Chainz – vocals
- 8Ball – vocals
- Ian Allen – music business affairs
- Eric Bailey – art direction, design, illustrations
- Chris Bellman – mastering
- Big K.R.I.T. – engineer, mixing, primary artist, producer
- Big Sant – vocals
- Eric Bisgyer – assistant engineer
- C. Bridges (Ludacris) – composer, vocals
- Mike Brown – vocal engineer
- Leesa D. Brunson – A&R
- Ralph Cacciurri – engineer, mixing
- D. Copeland (Devin the Dude) – composer, vocals
- Vol S. Davis III – music business affairs
- Steven Defino – design producer
- Andre Drizza – engineer
- Chris Ebbert – assistant
- Alex Eremin – assistant engineer
- Tasha Evans – vocals (background)
- Melanie Fiona – vocals
- B. Freeman (Bun B) – composer, vocals
- M. Goodwin (MJG) – composer, vocals
- Tina Guo – cello
- Anthony Hamilton – vocals
- Keyon Harrold – flugelhorn, horn arrangements, trumpet
- Mike Hartnett – bass, guitar
- Tony Hightower – vocals (background)
- Crystal Holy – vocals (background)
- Billy Hume – engineer, guitar, mixing
- W. Hutch – composer
- Marjoriea Jacobs – vocals (background)
- James Kang – assistant engineer
- Martin Kearns – keyboards
- Brian Kee – assistant engineer
- B.B. King – vocals, guitar
- Jason Kingsland – engineer
- Tai Linzie – art producer
- Ms. Linnie – vocals
- Pat Postlewait – bass
- L. Richie – composer
- Tacara Roberts – vocals
- Kathy Rodriguez-Harrold – horn arrangements, sax (alto), sax (tenor)
- Sha Money XL – A&R, executive producer
- Jonny Shipes – A&R, executive producer
- DJ Wally Sparks – A&R, scratching, vocals
- Steve-O – marketing
- Mark Tavern – A&R
- Antoinette Trotman – music business affairs
- Va$htie – vocals
- Lamar Williams – vocals (background)
- Tom Wolf – harmonica
- Nicole Wyskoarko – music business affairs

== Charts ==
=== Weekly charts ===
Chart (2012)	Peak position
US Billboard 200	5
US Top Rap Albums (Billboard)	1
US Top R&B/Hip-Hop Albums (Billboard)	1

=== Year-end charts ===
Chart (2012)	Position
US Top R&B/Hip-Hop Albums (Billboard)	62
