= Caveman (American band) =

American indie rock band

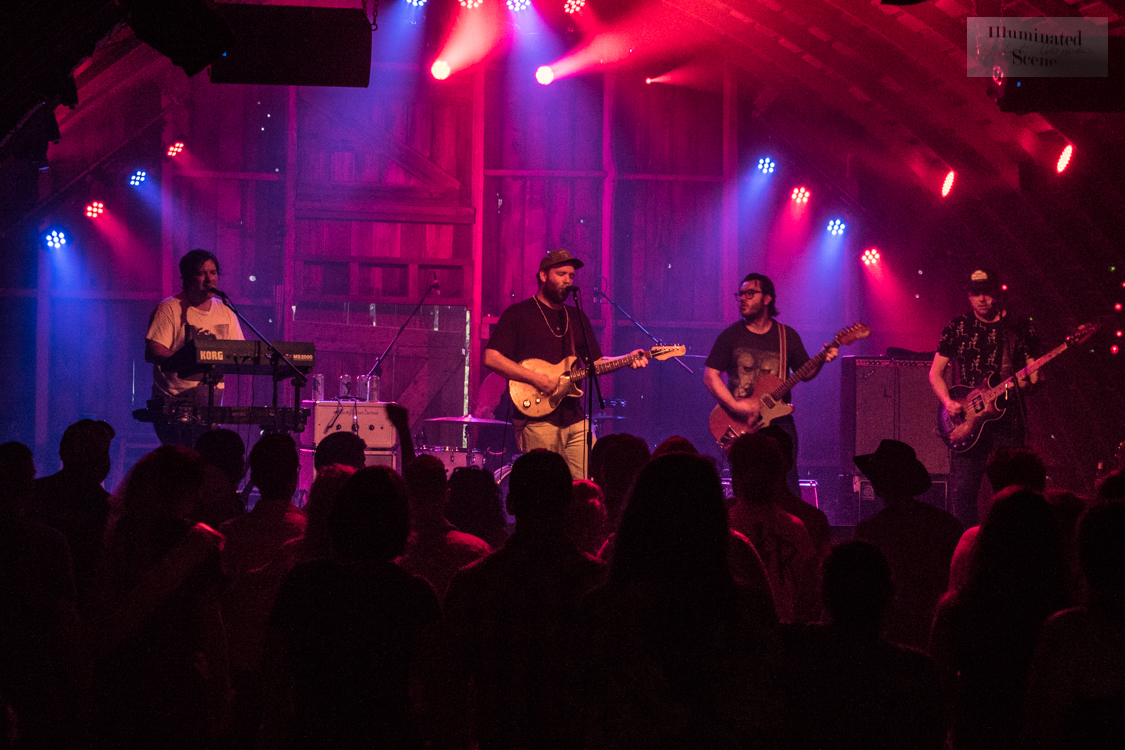

Background information
- Origin: Brooklyn, New York, United States
- Genres: Indie rock
- Years active: 2010–present
- Label: Fat Possum
- Members: Matthew Iwanusa; Jimmy Carbonetti; Stefan Marolachakis; Sam Hopkins; Jeff Berrall
- Website: cavemantheband.com

Caveman is an American indie rock band based in Brooklyn, New York. The band recorded their first studio album in 2011. Although originally self-released, the album was re-released by Fat Possum Records in 2012. Caveman performed at SXSW 2013 and Sasquatch Festival 2013. The band's musical style is a mixture of indie rock and indie pop. Caveman also performed at the Bonnaroo 2014 Arts and Music Festival.

The video for the song "In the City" features actress Julia Stiles.

== Studio albums ==
- CoCo Beware - self-released in 2011, re-released by Fat Possum Records (2012)
- Caveman (2013) Engineered and Mixed by Albert Di Fiore
- Otero War (June 2016) Produced and Engineered by Albert Di Fiore
- Smash (July 2021)
