= Jonny Shipes =

American music entrepreneur and producer

- Born: Jonathan Shapiro; 1980 (age 45–46); New York City
- Occupation: Record executive
- Years active: 2000–present
- Label: Cinematic
- Title: CEO and founder, GoodTalk, Cinematic Music Group
- Website: www.cinematicworldwide.com

Jonny Shipes is an American record executive. Credited with discovering Nipsey Hussle, Joey Bada$$, Sean Kingston, Big K.R.I.T., Smoke DZA, and Druski, he is the founder and CEO of GoodTalk, an independent record label and successor to Cinematic Music Group, a label he founded in 2007.

Shipes is also the co-founder of Smoker's Club, a cannabis lifestyle brand and semi-annual music festival and tour, and a partner in Babe's, a Finer Diner in the Hamptons.

== Early life and education ==
Shipes was born and raised in New York City. He heard hip-hop and rap for the first time when he was six, while attending a summer basketball camp, and "fell in love with the genre from the start." His taste extended beyond hip hop and rap, and in addition to the Geto Boys, Run-DMC, the Beastie Boys, Tupac, Biggie Smalls, Jay Z, OutKast, Nas, Scarface, and Snoop Dogg, he grew up listening to Guns N' Roses, Dido, Portishead, and Bjork.

Shipes was expelled from the high school he attended during his sophomore year and moved to East Hampton, where he lived with his mother, Linda Shapiro. A star basketball player, he graduated from East Hampton High in 1998, after attending basketball powerhouse The Frederick Gunn School in Washington, CT where he played shooting guard alongside the team's 2x All-New England point guard, Eric Hansen. Shapiro holds the Frederick Gunn School basketball record for three pointers made in a single game (13).

== Career ==
=== DJ, promoter, manager ===
After he graduated, Shipes—who had DJed in high school—supported himself by DJing and cleaning pools. In 2000 he began to promote parties such as "One Shot," a Thursday night event at a club in Wainscott that drew 1,000 people every week. At around the same time, he met Puff Daddy at a pickup basketball game; when the location of a retreat for Combs' Bad Boy Records staff fell through at the last minute, the company's head of marketing, Jameel Spencer, asked Shipes to help find an alternative site. He secured a new location for the retreat, and shortly thereafter Spencer hired Shipes as the first employee of Blue Flame, Combs' marketing company. At the same time, he was an A&R intern for Combs.

Shipes returned to New York City, and in addition to DJing, working his marketing gig at Blue Flame, and interning for Puffy, he produced and engineered recording sessions. He also managed DJs including DJ Felli Fel, DJ Spinbad and DJ Kay Slay, and at 22 became an artist manager, representing Foxy Brown and Nappy Roots, among others. He discovered and signed Smoke DZA in 2002. Over the next several years, Shipes managed artists including T-Pain, Brown, Nappy Roots, Big K.R.I.T., Joey Bada$$, Cam’ron, and Sean Kingston.

=== Cinematic Music Group, Nipsey Hussle, Big K.R.I.T, Joey Bada$$, Flipp Dinero ===
In 2007, with Smoke DZA, Shipes founded Cinematic Music Group (CMG), named to reflect an artist's ability to convey visuals with music.

Sean Kingston's debut album was among Cinematic's first releases. Released in conjunction with Epic and JR Rotem's Beluga Heights, the album contained four hit singles, including "Beautiful Girls", a #1 hit on the Hot 100.

In 2008, Shipes met Nipsey Hussle, whose music was recommended by Felly Fel, a DJ whom Shipes managed at the time. Shipes heard two of Hussle's songs on MySpace, and "instantly fell in love with the rawness, the message and his hard deliveries with sing-song hooks about the life he was living. He was painting pictures with every single word he spoke." A day later, Shipes was en route to L.A to meet Hussle. After several weeks of negotiations, Shipes signed Hustle to Cinematic in both a management and recording deal. Shipes worked on Hussle's albums Bullets Ain’t Got No Name Vol 1, Vol. 2 and Vol 3, producing "Strapped", "I dont give a fucc" & "Hussle in the House." He remained close to Hussle until Hussle's death in March 2019.

Shipes met and signed Big K.R.I.T in 2010, and discovered Joey Bada$$ in 2012. Shipes signed Bada$$ and Pro Era, named for his Brooklyn crew, shortly after they met. Cinematic released his mixtape 1999 in June 2012. Bada$$ released his debut album, B4.Da.$$ in 2015. It entered the Billboard charts at #5.

Shipes signed Flipp Dinero in 2016, and in 2017 Cinematic released his debut tape The Guala Way. In 2018 Dinero had a multi-platinum single, “Leave Me Alone." Luh Kel, Abby Jasmine, Mick Jenkins, Slayter, Yungeen Ace, and Jaydayoungan also signed with Shipes during the latter part of the 2010s. He co-produced Luh Kel's platinum single "Wrong," as well as his gold single "Pull Up."

Shipes connected with comedian Druski early in Druski's career and began managing him in 2020 as the comic's Instagram following approached one million. It has since grown to nearly six million. Shipes and Druski co-founded a film and TV production company, 4Lifers Entertainment.

=== Smoker's Club, FELT, NYC Together, Munchies, Grindstone ===
In 2009 Shipes, Smoke DZA and Shiest Bubz founded the Smoker's Club, a cannabis lifestyle company, and Smokers Club Records, merging their love for music with their love for cannabis. The first Smoker's Club show took place in Austin, Texas during SXSW at the Fire Engine House. DZA, Devin the Dude, Big K.R.I.T., Wiz Khalifa, Schoolboy Q and Kendrick Lamar performed. In 2010, Shipes, his then-business partner Steve-O Brown, Smoke DZA and Shiest Bubz subsequently launched the Smoker's Club Tour. Shipes personally financed the first Smoker's Club tour. The Smoker's Club now sells clothing and cannabis too since legalization.

Shipes was a partner in FELT, a New York-centric streetwear line.

A "pro stoner and amateur cook," Shipes has appeared on the Vice series Munchies. He has attempted to make food including donuts, shrimp and grits, and pizza rolls in "Recipe for Disaster" segments, and hosted several episodes of Drunk Eats. He went into the food business more seriously in summer 2020, when he invested in Sag Harbor, New York's popular Grindstone Coffee and Donuts.

Shipes raised money in partnership with NYC Together during the early part of the coronavirus pandemic by offering a singles contract to unsigned artists and charging a $20 submission fee for each entry. The submission fees were used to pay for learning devices and home tutors for kids in Brooklyn who were quarantined.

=== GoodTalk ===
In summer 2023, Shipes sold the Cinematic Music Group catalog to Interscope Geffen A&M in a deal reported to be worth eight figures, and launched a new venture, GoodTalk, a full-service entertainment company with divisions including talent management, a new record label, clothing and festivals verticals, and 4Lifers Entertainment, the film and TV production company he and Druski co-founded.
