= 4eva N a Day =

Mixtape by Big K.R.I.T.
- Released: March 5, 2012
- Recorded: 2011–2012
- Genres: Hip-hop; Southern hip-hop
- Length: 50:05
- Label: Cinematic Music Group
- Producers: Big K.R.I.T.; Jonny Shipes (exec.); Sha Money XL (also exec.)

Big K.R.I.T. chronology
Return of 4Eva (2011)	4eva N a Day (2012)	Live from the Underground (2012)

Singles from 4eva N a Day
- 1. "Boobie Miles" Released: February 1, 2012

4eva N a Day (pronounced as Forever and a Day) is a mixtape by Mississippi rapper and producer Big K.R.I.T. It was released for free digital download on March 5, 2012 under independent record label Cinematic Music Group. The mixtape was released in anticipation of K.R.I.T.'s debut studio album Live from the Underground (2012). It was entirely produced, arranged and mixed by Big K.R.I.T., with assistance from Ralph Cacciurri, and contains 17 tracks with no vocal guest appearances. An extended play containing three songs from the mixtape ("Boobie Miles", "Red Eye" & "Insomnia"), including two new songs, was released on iTunes on April 10, 2012. Upon its release, 4EvaNaDay received critical acclaim from music critics. The mixtape has been downloaded over 236,000 times on professional mixtape site Datpiff.

The first single "Boobie Miles", track 4 on the mixtape, was released on February 1, 2012, over a month before the release of the mixtape. The music video was uploaded to VEVO on March 8, 2012.

== Background ==
The mixtape was first announced in early December 2011, saying: "Based off the experience of touring in the past year I'm creating this free album from scratch as we speak. I have locked myself back in the studio - 4Eva & a Day coming soon on bigkrit.com". The instrumental tape was released on August 13, 2013.

== Critical reception ==
Professional ratings
Aggregate scores
Source	Rating
Metacritic	78/100
Review scores
Source	Rating
DJBooth	4.5/5 stars
MSN Music (Expert Witness)	A−
Paste Magazine	8.5/10
Pitchfork	6.8/10
PopMatters	4/5 stars
Q Magazine	4/5 stars
Rolling Stone	3.5/5 stars
Spin	8/10
XXL	4/5

Upon its release, 4EvaNaDay received critical acclaim from music critics, assuming an aggregate score of 78 out of 100 on Metacritic based on seventeen reviews.

== Track listing ==
All tracks are written by Big K.R.I.T.

No.	Title	Length
1.	"8:04 AM"	0:31
2.	"Wake Up" (Saxophone by Willie B)	2:46
3.	"Yesterday"	2:33
4.	"Boobie Miles"	3:25
5.	"4evaNaDay" (Theme)	3:06
6.	"Me and My Old School" (Guitar by Mike Hartnett)	3:50
7.	"1986"	3:14
8.	"Country Rap Tunes"	3:12
9.	"Sky Club"	3:19
10.	"Red Eye"	2:45
11.	"Down & Out"	3:29
12.	"Package Store"	3:41
13.	"Temptation"	3:19
14.	"Handwriting"	3:33
15.	"Insomnia" (Guitar by Mike Hartnett)	4:04
16.	"5:04 AM"	0:27
17.	"The Alarm"	2:43
Total length:		50:05

=== 4evaNaDay: Road Less Traveled Edition ===
The mixtape was released on iTunes as an EP on April 10, 2012. It featured three songs from the mixtape, plus two new songs.

No.	Title	Length
1.	"Boobie Miles"	3:27
2.	"Man On Fire"	3:00
3.	"Sideline"	2:39
4.	"Insomnia"	4:02
5.	"Red Eye"	2:49

Sample credits

- "Yesterday" contains a sample from "Seeing You" by George Duke
- "Boobie Miles" contains a sample from "Morning Tears" by MFSB
- "4EvaNaDay (Theme)" contains a sample from "Ain't Understanding Mellow" by Jerry Butler and Brenda Lee Eager
- "Me And My Old School" contains a sample from "Mother's Theme (Mama)" by Willie Hutch
- "1986" contains a sample from "Woman's Gotta Have It" by Bobby Womack
- "Sky Club" contains a sample from "Like A Tattoo" by Sade
- "Red Eye" contains a sample from "Amen, Brother" by The Winstons
- "Down & Out" contains a sample from "Bridge Through Time" by Lonnie Liston Smith
- "Temptation" contains a sample from "The New Style" by Beastie Boys
- "Handwriting" contains a sample from "The Handwriting Is On The Wall" by Ann Peebles
- "The Alarm" contains a sample from "Do What You Wanna Do" by The Dramatics

== Personnel ==
Credits adapted from mixtape back cover.

- Big K.R.I.T. — primary artist, producer, mixer, arrangement
- Jonny Shipes — executive producer, management, A&R
- Sha Money — executive producer, A&R
- Steve-D — marketing
- Jen McDaniels — management
- Mike Hartnett — guitar
- Willie Brinson — saxophone
- Ralph Cacciurri — mixer
