= Digital Roses Don't Die =

Studio album by Big K.R.I.T.
- Released: February 18, 2022
- Genres: R&B; funk
- Length: 38:00
- Labels: Multi Alumni; BMG
- Producers: Big K.R.I.T.; Ashanti Floyd; Darhyl Camper, Jr.; Jared Alexander Jackson

Big K.R.I.T. chronology
K.R.I.T. Iz Here (2019)	Digital Roses Don't Die (2022)	Full Court Press (2022)

Singles from Digital Roses Don't Die
- 1. "So Cool" Released: January 21, 2022; 2. "Southside of the Moon" Released: February 15, 2022

Digital Roses Don't Die is the fifth studio album by American rapper Big K.R.I.T., released February 18, 2022, by Multi Alumni and BMG Rights Management. The album release was paired with the Digital Roses Tour with ELHAE and Price, announced in February.

== Reception ==
Digital Roses Don't Die ratings
Aggregate scores
Source	Rating
Metacritic	66/100
Review scores
Source	Rating
Beats Per Minute	75%
Clash	7/10
Exclaim!	6/10
HipHopDX	3.1/5
Pitchfork	6.2/10

According to the review aggregator Metacritic, Digital Roses Don't Die received "generally favorable reviews" based on a weighted average score of 66 out of 100 from 5 critic scores.

=== Year-end lists ===
Digital Roses Don't Die year-end lists
Publication	#	Ref.
Albumism	90	

== Track listing ==
All tracks are written by Justin Scott, with additional writers noted. All tracks are produced by Big K.R.I.T. except where noted.

Digital Roses Don't Die track listing
No.	Title	Writer(s)	Producer(s)	Length
1.	"Fire (Interlude)"	Ashanti Floyd	Ashanti Floyd the Mad Violinist	0:47
2.	"Southside of the Moon"	Darhyl Camper, Jr.	Camper	2:19
3.	"Show U Right"			3:00
4.	"Rhode Clean"			2:27
5.	"Earth (Interlude)"	Floyd	Floyd	1:32
6.	"Cum Out to Play"			2:57
7.	"Just 4 You"			2:27
8.	"So Cool"			1:51
9.	"Water (Interlude)"	Jared Alexander Jackson	Jackson	1:17
10.	"Boring"			1:40
11.	"Would It Matter"			2:19
12.	"Generational - Weighed Down"			3:50
13.	"Wind (Interlude)"	Floyd	Floyd	1:07
14.	"It's Over Now"	Clarence Reid; Willie Clarke		2:48
15.	"Wet Lashes & Shot Glasses" (featuring Rolynné)			2:49
16.	"All the Time"			2:20
17.	"More Than Roses"			2:30
Total length:				38:00

== Personnel ==
- Big K.R.I.T. – vocals
- Mike Hartnett – guitars (1–7, 10–12, 14–16), bass (3, 10)
- Jared Alexander Jackson – trumpet (3, 4, 7, 8, 10–12, 15, 17), bass (3, 5, 6, 9, 13, 15)
- Ashanti Floyd – strings (3, 6, 9, 11, 12, 15, 17), synth bass (3, 11), synthesizer (3, 15), bells (3), bass Moog (17), Mellotron (17)
- James Devon Brabham – keyboards (5–7, 11, 12), synth bass (7, 12, 15), bass Moog (4, 8), bells (12, 15), synthesizer (3), Rhodes piano (4)
- Andre Mo'Dre Brown – talk box (3)
- DJ Wally Sparks – scratching (7, 12)
- David Jackson – backing vocals (9)
- Adrian Crutchfield – flute (13, 17)
- Rolynné – vocals (15)
- John Horesco – engineering
- Marshall Helgesen – engineering
- Micah Wyatt – engineering
- Ralph Cacciurri – engineering
- LeXander Bryant - photography
