= K.R.I.T. Wuz Here =

Mixtape by Big K.R.I.T.
- Released: May 4, 2010
- Recorded: 2009–2010
- Genre: Hip hop, Southern hip hop
- Length: 73:30
- Label: Cinematic, Nature Sounds
- Producer: Big K.R.I.T. (also exec.)

Big K.R.I.T. chronology
The Last King (2009)	K.R.I.T. Wuz Here (2010)	Return of 4Eva (2011)

Singles from K.R.I.T. Wuz Here
- 1. "Country Shit" Released: September 28, 2010

Professional ratings
Review scores
Source	Rating
Pitchfork	(7.7/10)
SPIN.com	(8/10)
DJBooth	4/5 stars

K.R.I.T. Wuz Here is the sixth mixtape by American rapper Big K.R.I.T. It was released on May 4, 2010. The mixtape features guest appearances from Curren$y, Wiz Khalifa, Devin the Dude, Big Sant and Smoke DZA.

== Track listing ==
- All songs written and composed by Big K.R.I.T.

No.	Title	Length
1.	"Return of 4eva" (featuring Big Sant)	3:24
2.	"Country Shit"	3:10
3.	"Just Touched Down"	3:45
4.	"Hometown Hero"	3:28
5.	"Viktorious"	2:18
6.	"See Me on Top"	2:39
7.	"Glass House" (featuring Curren$y and Wiz Khalifa)	3:21
8.	"Children of the World"	3:12
9.	"They Got Us"	3:26
10.	"Good Enough"	3:54
11.	"No Wheaties" (featuring Smoke DZA and Curren$y)	3:09
12.	"Something"	4:57
13.	"Moon & Stars" (featuring Devin the Dude)	3:53
14.	"Neva Go Back"	3:53
15.	"Gumpshun"	3:34
16.	"2000 & Beyond"	4:17
17.	"I Gotta Stay"	3:35
18.	"As Small as a Giant"	4:12
19.	"Voices"	5:12
20.	"I Heard It All" (Bonus Track)	2:58

re-release bonus tracks
No.	Title	Length
21.	"Now or Neva"	3:57
22.	"Exhibit K (Freestyle)"	3:56
23.	"I Got Drank (Freestyle)"	2:29

2020 remastered version
No.	Title	Length
1.	"Return of 4eva" (featuring Big Sant)	3:24
2.	"Viktorious"	2:18
3.	"Glass House" (featuring Curren$y and Wiz Khalifa)	3:21
4.	"Children of the World"	3:12
5.	"They Got Us"	3:26
6.	"Good Enough"	3:54
7.	"No Wheaties" (featuring Smoke DZA and Curren$y)	3:09
8.	"Something"	4:57
9.	"Neva Go Back"	3:53
10.	"Gumpshun"	3:34
11.	"2000 & Beyond"	4:17
12.	"I Gotta Stay"	3:35
13.	"As Small as a Giant"	4:12
14.	"Voices"	5:12
15.	"Talk To Them"	2:25
16.	"Cold Game"	3:07
17.	"Get Over"	4:31
18.	"Make Sense"	2:40
