= Big K.R.I.T. =

American rapper and record producer (born 1986)

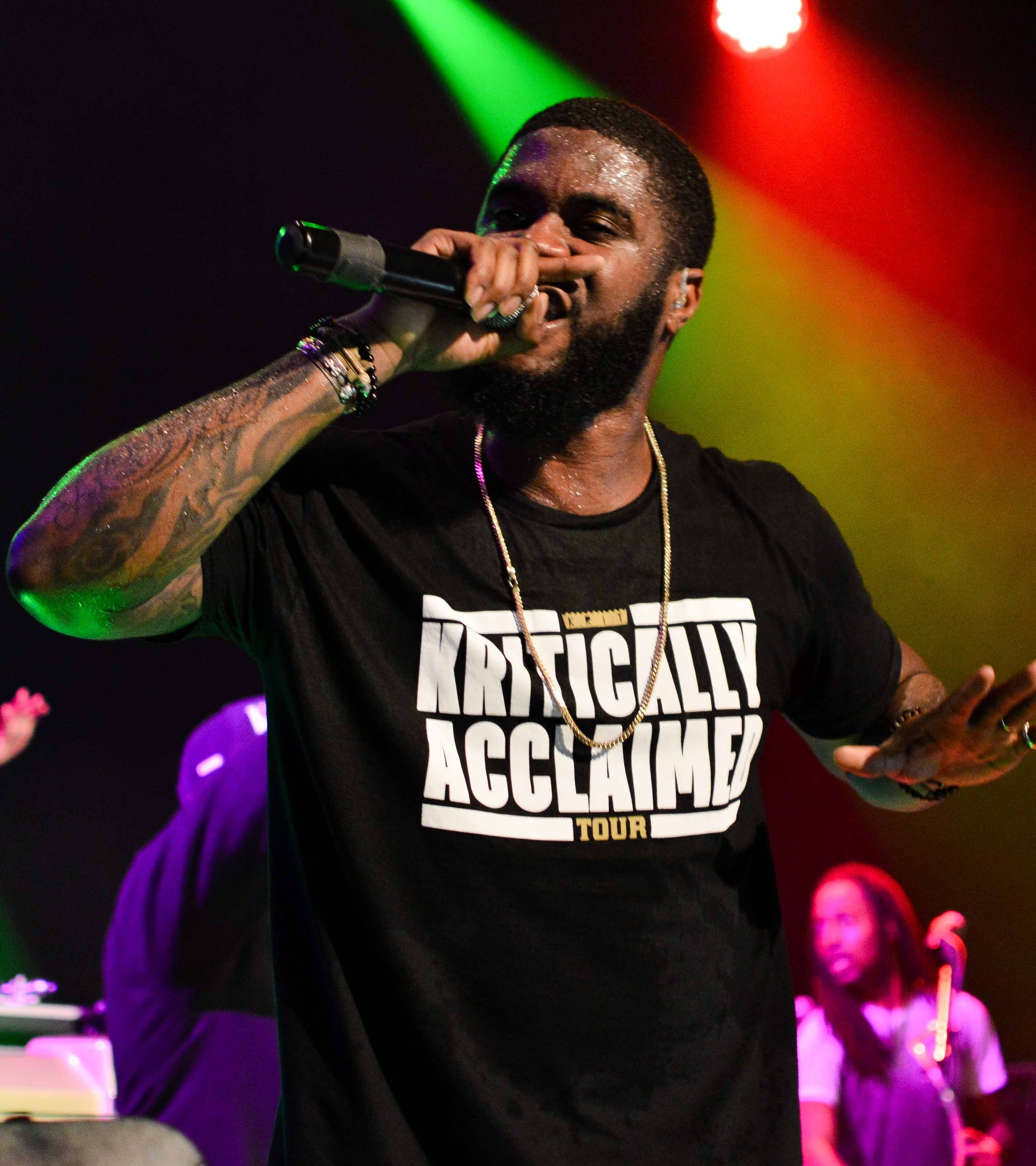
- K.R.I.T. performing in 2015

Background information
- Born: Justin Lewis Scott; August 26, 1986 (age 40); Meridian, Mississippi, U.S.
- Genres: Southern hip-hop; conscious hip-hop
- Occupations: Rapper; songwriter; record producer
- Works: Discography; production
- Years active: 2005–present
- Labels: Multi Alumni; BMG; Cinematic; Def Jam; Nature Sounds; RBC
- Website: bigkrit.com

Justin Lewis Scott (born August 26, 1986), known professionally as Big K.R.I.T. (a backronym for King Remembered in Time), is an American rapper and record producer. Born in Meridian, Mississippi, he began his musical career in 2005. He was signed to Def Jam Recordings by Sha Money XL in 2010, and first gained recognition following the release of his single "Country Shit" (remixed featuring Ludacris and Bun B) in September of that year. The following year, he guest appeared on T.I.'s promotional single "I'm Flexin'", which became Scott's first entry on the Billboard Hot 100.

Scott's first two studio albums, Live from the Underground (2012) and Cadillactica (2014), both debuted at number five on the Billboard 200. After parting ways with Def Jam, he launched the record label Multi Alumni in 2017 to release his subsequent albums: 4eva Is a Mighty Long Time (2017), K.R.I.T. Iz Here (2019), and Digital Roses Don't Die (2022). Each met with critical praise, Cadillactica was listed by Billboard and Complex as among the best albums of that year. Furthermore, Scott has produced for other artists, with credits on releases for Lil Wayne, 2 Chainz, T.I., Slim Thug, ASAP Ferg, Freddie Gibbs, E-40, and Berner, among others.

== Career ==
=== 2005–2010: Beginnings ===
Scott previously released several mixtapes, including Hood Fame, with DJ Wally Sparks and The Last King, with DJ Breakem Off. He also made guest appearances on Pilot Talk, the third studio album and major label debut from Louisiana rapper Currensy, as well as Kush & Orange Juice, the critically acclaimed mixtape by rapper Wiz Khalifa. When he started branding himself, he went by the name of Kritikal, before shortening it to K.R.I.T.

In May 2010, Scott released his mixtape, K.R.I.T. Wuz Here, digitally, garnering critical acclaim. That same month, former president of G-Unit Records and current Senior VP of A&R at Def Jam Records, Sha Money XL, signed him to the label as one of his first priorities in his new position.

In October 2010, Scott co-headlined The Smoker's Club Tour 2010 alongside fellow rappers Curren$y and Smoke DZA. In November 2010, Scott opened for Wiz Khalifa in Baltimore, Maryland, Sayreville, New Jersey, Winston-Salem, North Carolina and Ashland, Virginia during the Waken Baken Tour.

=== 2011–2015: Live from the Underground and Cadillactica ===
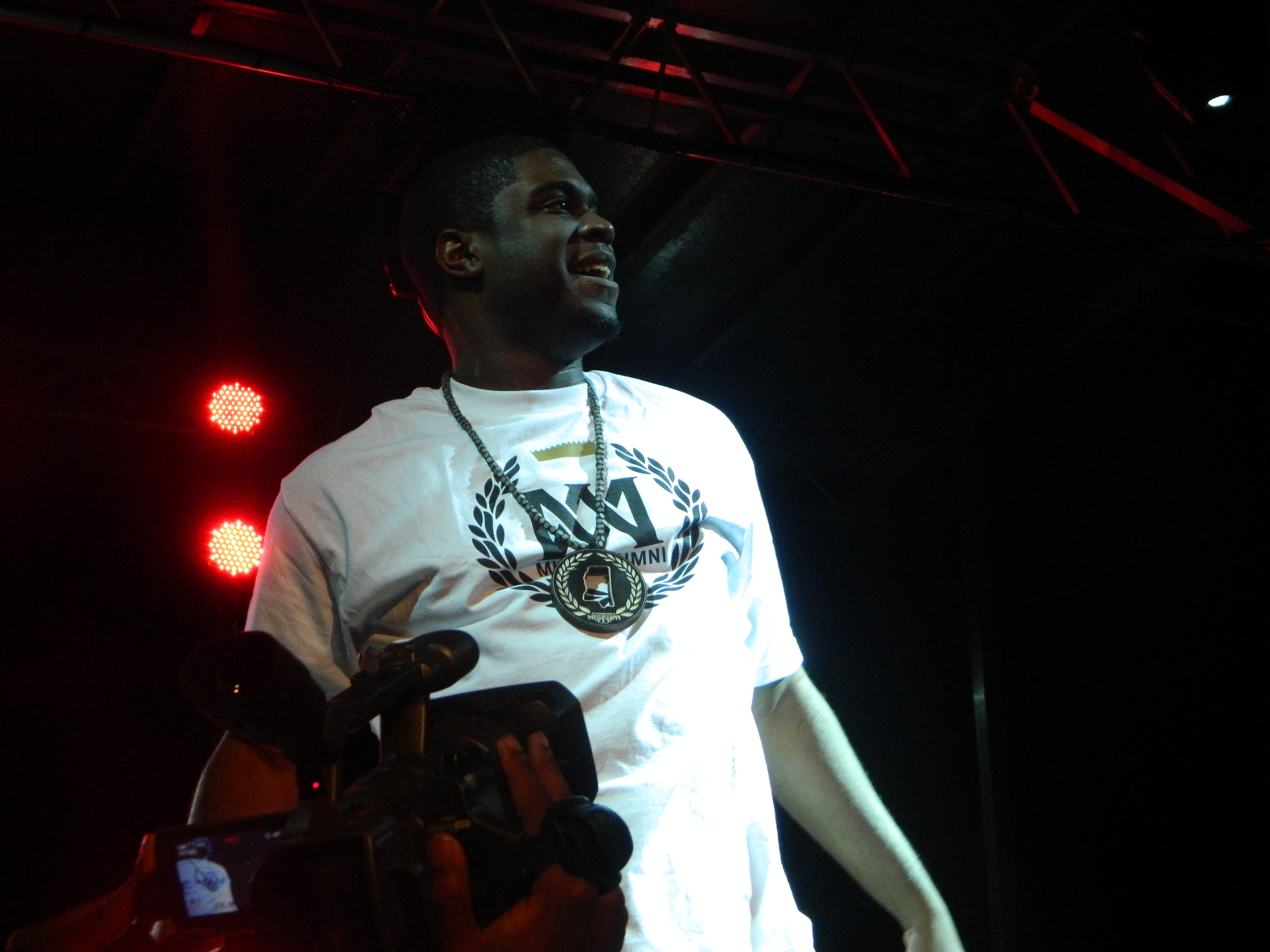
Scott at Clark Atlanta's Homecoming in 2011.

In early 2011, he was featured on the cover of XXL as part of their annual Top Freshmen of the year, along with the likes of other rappers including Meek Mill, Cyhi the Prynce, Lil Twist, Yelawolf, Fred the Godson, Mac Miller, YG, Lil B, Kendrick Lamar and Diggy Simmons.

In March 2011, Scott released his highly anticipated and entirely self-produced mixtape, Return of 4Eva, featuring guests David Banner, Joi, Big Sant, Chamillionaire, Raheem DeVaughn, Ludacris, and Bun B. The mixtape has been acclaimed by rap critics, with William Ketchum of HipHopDX calling it "emotive, conceptual music" and saying that Scott had given fans a "free album" – the magazine's highest praise for a mixtape. Meanwhile, Matthew Cole of Slant Magazine highlighted Return of 4Eva in his mixtape review column as "the best mixtape of the month," going on in a separate review to call it "the rap album to beat in 2011 ". Both critics praised Scott's production skills as much as his lyrics and flow, and both named Scott as a likely successor to Southern rap legends UGK, Scarface, and Outkast. On April 20, 2011, Tom Breihan reviewed the mixtape for Pitchfork, giving an 8.2 out of 10 and awarding it the site's coveted "Best New Music" tag.

On July 1, 2011, Scott announced the title of his debut studio album, Live from the Underground. It was originally set to be released on September 27, 2011. From October 12, 2011, until November 24, 2011, Scott co-headlined The Smoker's Club Tour 2011 with Curren$y and Method Man. Scott released Live from the Underground June 5, 2012, to tremendous expectancy. It debuted at number one on the Hip Hop, R&B, and Rap Charts. He released his first single off the album titled, "I Got This" on May 7, 2012. He went on the "Live from the Underground" tour, which he headlined along with Slim Thug. In an interview on Bootleg Kev's radio show, on August 10, 2012, he confirmed that he and fellow Southern rapper Yelawolf were working on a collaborative album entitled Country Cousins. During the same interview, he was also asked about his favorite rappers, to which he responded, "Scarface. Man, I need these people in groups. Can I put the rest as a group? Outkast, UGK and 8Ball & MJG. That's what my iTunes consists of." Scott along with singer Ashthon Jones collaborated with Lecrae for his single "Mayday" from Gravity.

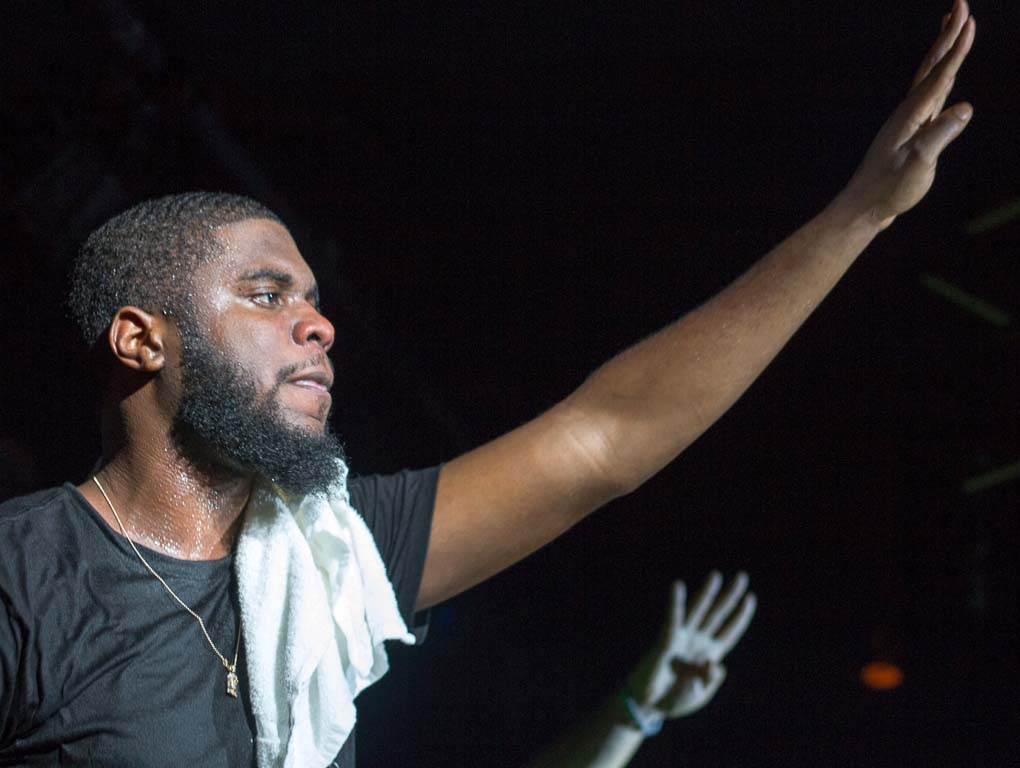
Scott in 2014

On January 10, 2013, Scott announced his next mixtape as King Remembered In Time. Also naming Mike WiLL Made It as a producer on both the mixtape and his next album. He went on to indicate this mixtape and his next album would not be entirely produced by himself like his previous works, with his album not being produced by himself at all. The first single off the mixtape was released on February 27, 2013, titled, "Shine On". The song features rapper Bun B and was produced by Scott He has also put out songs produced by 9th Wonder. Scott (King Remembered In Time) would be released on April 10, 2013. The mixtape features primary production handled by Scott himself and guest appearances by Wiz Khalifa, Future, Smoke DZA and Trinidad James among others.

On June 13, 2013, in an interview with Dead End Hip Hop, Scott hinted towards the title of his upcoming second studio album, stating that the title is featured in the opening seconds of the Intro from his debut album "Live from the Underground". In August 2013, he told HipHopDX that Chad Hugo of The Neptunes, DJ Dahi and Terrace Martin will provide some of the album's soulful production. Scott also said he has refocused his energy on his rhymes and delivery, as he allows producers to craft some of the beats for him. On September 30, 2013, Scott announced that his second album would be called Cadillactica. In October 2013, he told XXL that Jim Jonsin, Rico Love, DJ Toomp, and himself would also provide production on the album. On April 28, 2014, he released the first single off his second album, titled "Mt. Olympus". The second single from Cadillatica, "Pay Attention" released July 25, 2014.

=== 2016–present: 4eva Is a Mighty Long Time and K.R.I.T. iz Here ===
After releasing twelve freestyles in twelve hours, Scott announced through Twitter that he and Def Jam had parted ways on July 6, 2016.

On October 27, 2017, Scott released his third studio album, 4eva Is a Mighty Long Time. The album marks Scott's first independent release under his Multi Alumni label, following a departure from Def Jam. It debuted at number seven on the Billboard 200. The album was supported by four singles: "Confetti", "Keep the Devil Off", "Aux Cord" and "1999".

On July 12, 2019, Scott released his fourth studio album, K.R.I.T. Iz Here.

On February 18, 2022, Scott released his fifth studio album, Digital Roses Don't Die.

== Artistry ==
I thank God I was able to come up with the acronym King Remembered In Time. It's something that I will never be able to live up to as an artist, but it allows me to keep grinding and not get complacent.

— K.R.I.T. talks his stage name in an interview with Respect.

Scott's musical training began in elementary school up through junior high school playing the cello, and having the ability to read music helped him out tremendously as an artist. While talking about how he started producing music, Scott said: "At the time, I was young and I didn't have no job. It wasn't like I could really afford to pay for beats. At the same time, there was this program that came out for PlayStation, MTV Music Generator, where you could make your own beats. So I started making my own beats right around that time because I just couldn't afford to pay for the other ones." Scott has cited UGK, Outkast, 8Ball & MJG, Tupac Shakur, The Notorious B.I.G., David Banner and CeeLo Green as his influences.

Scott is known in Birmingham, Alabama as being one of the favorite artists of the current Birmingham Mayor, Randall Woodfin. "Mt. Olympus (Reprise)" and "Energy" were featured on Mayor Woodfin's Mayoral Mixtape, which was released on Spotify in the summer of 2021.

== Discography ==
Studio albums

- Live from the Underground (2012)
- Cadillactica (2014)
- 4eva Is a Mighty Long Time (2017)
- K.R.I.T. Iz Here (2019)
- Digital Roses Don't Die (2022)
- Dedicated to Cadalee Biarritz (2025)

Collaborative albums

- Full Court Press (with Wiz Khalifa, Smoke DZA and Girl Talk) (2022)

== Awards and nominations ==
Year	Awards	Category	Nominated work	Result
2011	BET Hip Hop Awards	Rookie of the Year	Himself	Nominated
2011	BET Hip Hop Awards	Reese's Perfect Combo Award (Best Collab)	"Country Shit" (Remix)	Nominated
2011	BET Hip Hop Awards	Best Mixtape	Return of 4Eva	Nominated
