= Return of 4Eva =

Mixtape by Big K.R.I.T.
- Released: March 28, 2011
- Genre: Hip-hop; Southern hip-hop
- Length: 76:15 (Standard); 48:06 (Streaming)
- Label: Cinematic Music Group
- Producer: Big K.R.I.T.

Big K.R.I.T. chronology
K.R.I.T. Wuz Here (2010)	Return of 4Eva (2011)	4eva N a Day (2012)

Singles from Return of 4Eva
- 1. "Country Shit (Remix)" Released: April 2011

Return of 4Eva is a 2011 self-produced official mixtape by rapper and producer Big K.R.I.T. released on March 28, 2011. The mixtape features guest appearances from Chamillionaire, Raheem DeVaughn, Joi, Big Sant, and fellow Mississippian, David Banner. Released to critical acclaim, it was named the 32nd best album of 2011 by Rolling Stone, 27th by Spin, and an honorable mention by Pitchfork.

Professional ratings
Review scores
Source	Rating
RapReviews	4.25/5 stars
Pitchfork Media	8.2/10
Robert Christgau	B+

== Track listing ==
- All songs written and composed by Big K.R.I.T.

Return of 4Eva track listing
No.	Title	Writer(s)	Length
1.	"R4 Intro"	Justin Scott	1:46
2.	"Rise & Shine"	Scott	2:44
3.	"R4 Theme Song"	Scott	2:50
4.	"Dreamin'"	Scott	4:06
5.	"Rotation"	Scott	3:02
6.	"My Sub"	Scott	3:05
7.	"Sookie Now" (featuring David Banner)	Scott; Lavell Crump	4:13
8.	"American Rapstar"	Scott	3:07
9.	"Highs & Lows"	Scott	3:58
10.	"Shake It" (featuring Joi)	Scott; Joi Gilliam	3:02
11.	"Made Alot" (featuring Big Sant)	Scott; Santiaugo Gathright	3:43
12.	"Lions & Lambs"	Scott	4:11
13.	"King's Blues"	Scott	3:01
14.	"Time Machine" (featuring Chamillionaire)	Scott; Hakeem Seriki	4:41
15.	"Get Right"	Scott	3:55
16.	"Amtrak"	Scott	3:20
17.	"Players Ballad" (featuring Raheem DeVaughn)	Scott; Raheem DeVaughn	4:13
18.	"Another Naive Individual Glorifying Greed & Encouraging Racism"	Scott	3:37
19.	"Free My Soul"	Scott	4:19
20.	"The Vent"	Scott	5:20
21.	"Country Shit (Remix)" (featuring Ludacris and Bun B)	Scott; Christopher Bridges; Bernard Freeman	4:02
Total length:			76:15

Physical edition (bonus tracks)
No.	Title	Writer(s)	Length
21.	"Shake Junt"	Scott	2:30
Total length:			74:43

Streaming edition
No.	Title	Length
1.	"R4 Intro"	1:46
2.	"Rise & Shine"	2:44
3.	"Dreamin"	4:06
4.	"Rotation"	3:02
5.	"My Sub"	3:05
6.	"American Rapstar"	3:07
7.	"Highs & Lows"	3:58
8.	"Shake It" (featuring Joi)	3:02
9.	"Lions & Lambs"	4:11
10.	"Kings Blues"	3:01
11.	"Get Right"	3:55
12.	"Players Ballad" (featuring Raheem DeVaughn)	4:13
13.	"Another Naïve Individual Glorifying Greed & Encouraging Racism"	3:37
14.	"Free My Soul"	4:19
Total length:		48:06

Notes

- The physical release replaces "Country Shit (Remix)" with "Shake Junt"
- The streaming version excludes the tracks "R4 Theme Song", "Sookie Now", "Made Alot", "Time Machine", "Amtrak", "The Vent", and "Country Shit (Remix)", bringing the total length to 48:06

== R4: The Prequel ==
The mixtape was released to iTunes as an EP on June 7, 2011. It featured four songs from the mixtape, plus one remix.

No.	Title	Length
1.	"Sookie Now" (featuring David Banner)	4:14
2.	"Country Shit (Remix)" (featuring Bun B & Ludacris)	4:02
3.	"Time Machine" (featuring Chamillionaire)	4:41
4.	"The Vent"	5:21
5.	"Moon & Stars (Remix)" (featuring Curren$y & Killa Kyleon)	3:49
