= Kirk Knight production discography =

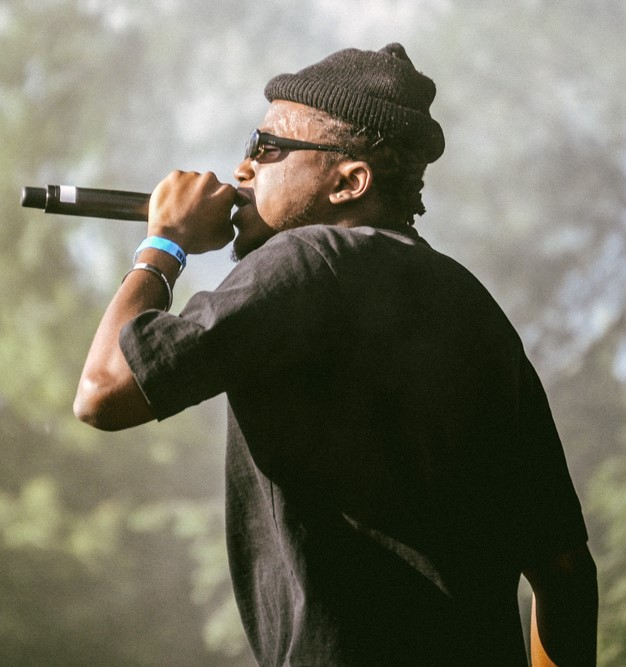
Kirk Knight performing in 2016

The following list is a discography of production by Kirk Knight, an American record producer and rapper who is a member of the hip hop collective Pro Era. It includes a list of songs produced, co-produced and remixed by year, artist, album and title.

== Singles produced ==
List of singles
Title	Artist(s)	Year	Peak chart positions		Album
Title	Artist(s)	Year	US	US R&B/HH	Album
"Knight Time"	Kirk Knight	2015	—	—	Late Knight Special
"Dead Friends" (featuring Nonamegypsy and Thundercat)	Kirk Knight	2015	—	—	Late Knight Special
"Good Knight" (featuring Joey Badass, Flatbush Zombies and Dizzy Wright)	Kirk Knight	2015	—	—	—N/a
"Devastated" (Note: "Devastated was co-produced with Adam Pallin and Powers Pleasant.)	Joey Badass	2016	— (Note: "Devastated" did not enter the US Billboard Hot 100, but peaked at number 25 on the Bubbling Under Hot 100 Singles chart.)	47	All-Amerikkkan Bada$$
"Land of the Free" (Note: "Land of the Free" was co-produced with Adam Pallin.)	Joey Badass	2017	—	—	All-Amerikkkan Bada$$
"Off the Wall"	Nyck @ Knight	2017	—	—	Nyck @ Knight
"Dial Up" (Note: "Dial Up" was co-produced with Adam Pallin.)	Nyck @ Knight	2017	—	—	Nyck @ Knight
"Plain Jane"	A$AP Ferg	2017	97	37	Still Striving

== 2012 ==
=== Pro Era – The Secc$ Tap.e ===
- 03. "Flight 13" (featuring Kirk Knight)
- 10. "Update" (featuring Joey Badass)

=== Capital Steez – AmeriKKKan Korruption ===
- 09. "HYPE Beast" (featuring Uno Hype)

=== Joey Badass – Rejex ===
- 08. "Fantom"
- 09. "Silent Night"
- 12. "Update"

=== Capital Steez – AmeriKKKan Korruption Reloaded ===
- 09. "HYPE Beast" (featuring Uno Hype)
- 19. "Herban Legend"
- 21. "Apex"

=== Pro Era – PEEP: The aPROcalypse ===
- 06. "Florists" (featuring Kirk Knight)

== 2013 ==
=== Eckō Unltd. – Underground Airplay ===
- 01. "Relaxation"
- 05. "Lift Up" (Nyck Caution featuring Kirk Knight)

=== Peter Rosenberg and Eckō Unltd. – Underground Airplay 2: The New York Renaissance ===
- 05. "Scotty" (featuring Nyck Caution)

=== Joey Badass – Summer Knights ===
- 01. "Alowha"
- 05. "Right On Time"
- 16. "#LongLiveSteelo"

=== Joey Badass – Summer Knights EP ===
- 05. "#LongLiveSteelo"

== 2014 ==
=== Pro Era – The Secc$ Tap.e 2 ===
- 03. "Pussy Facx" (featuring Kirk Knight)
- 08. "Far" (featuring Nyck Caution, Kirk Knight, T'nah Apex and Dirty Sanchez)

=== Smoke DZA – Dream.ZONE.Achieve ===
- 06. "Fhvt BVsturd" (featuring Joey Badass)

=== Mick Jenkins – The Water[s] ===
- 15. "Jerome" (featuring Joey Badass)

=== Pro Era – The Shift ===
- 01. "Extortion" (featuring Kirk Knight and Dyemond Lewis)
- 04. "On My Life" (featuring Joey Badass and Nyck Caution)

== 2015 ==
=== Joey Badass – B4.DA.$$ ===
- 05. "Big Dusty"
- 06. "Hazeus View"

=== Kirk Knight – Late Knight Special ===
- 01. "Start Running"
- 02. "Heaven Is for Real"
- 03. "Brokeland"
- 04. "5 Minutes" (featuring Joey Badass)
- 05. "Knight Time"
- 06. "One Knight" (featuring The Mind) (Note: "One Knight" and "The Future" were co-produced with THEMpeople.)
- 07. "Scorpio"
- 08. "Down"
- 09. "I Know" (featuring Mick Jenkins)
- 10. "Dead Friends" (featuring Noname and Thundercat) (Note: "Dead Friends" was co-produced with Thundercat.)
- 11. "The Future" (featuring The Mind)
- 12. "All for Nothing"

== 2016 ==
=== Nyck Caution – Disguise the Limit ===
- 03. "Baptize" (Note: "Baptize" was co-produced with Jake Birch.)
- 05. "Basin"
- 06. "Show No Love" (featuring Kirk Knight)
- 07. "Just In Case" (featuring Alex Mali)
- 10. "Wordsmith"
- 12. "Out of Reach" (featuring The Mind and Alex Mali)

=== Kirk Knight – Black Noise ===
- 01. "Flight 14"
- 02. "Plastic Dream"
- 03. "Mute"
- 04. "Ai"
- 05. "Young Ones"
- 06. "Flexible"
- 07. "Memories"
- 08. "Retrograde"
- 09. "Lay It Down"
- 10. "Magic Mirror"
- 11. "Magic Mirror" (Bonus track)

=== CJ Fly - Flytrap ===
- 03. "IDGAF"

== 2017 ==
=== Joey Bada$$ – All-Amerikkkan Bada$$ ===
- 03. "Temptation" (Note: "Temptation" was co-produced with Adam Pallin.)
- 04. "Land of the Free"
- 05. "Devastated"
- 08. "Ring the Alarm" (featuring Kirk Knight, Nyck Caution and Meechy Darko) (Note: "Ring the Alarm" was co-produced with Adam Pallin.)

=== Nyck @ Knight – Nyck @ Knight ===
- 01. "Off the Wall"
- 02. "All Night"
- 04. "Dial Up"
- 05. "Perfect Murder" (Note: "Perfect Murder" was co-produced with Adam Pallin.)
- 06. "Headlights"
- 07. "Audiopium"
- 08. "Wake Up"

Producer credits: Kirk Knight on Instagram

=== A$AP Ferg − Still Striving ===
- 08. "Plain Jane"
- 13. "Nandos"
