= ASTR =

US musical group

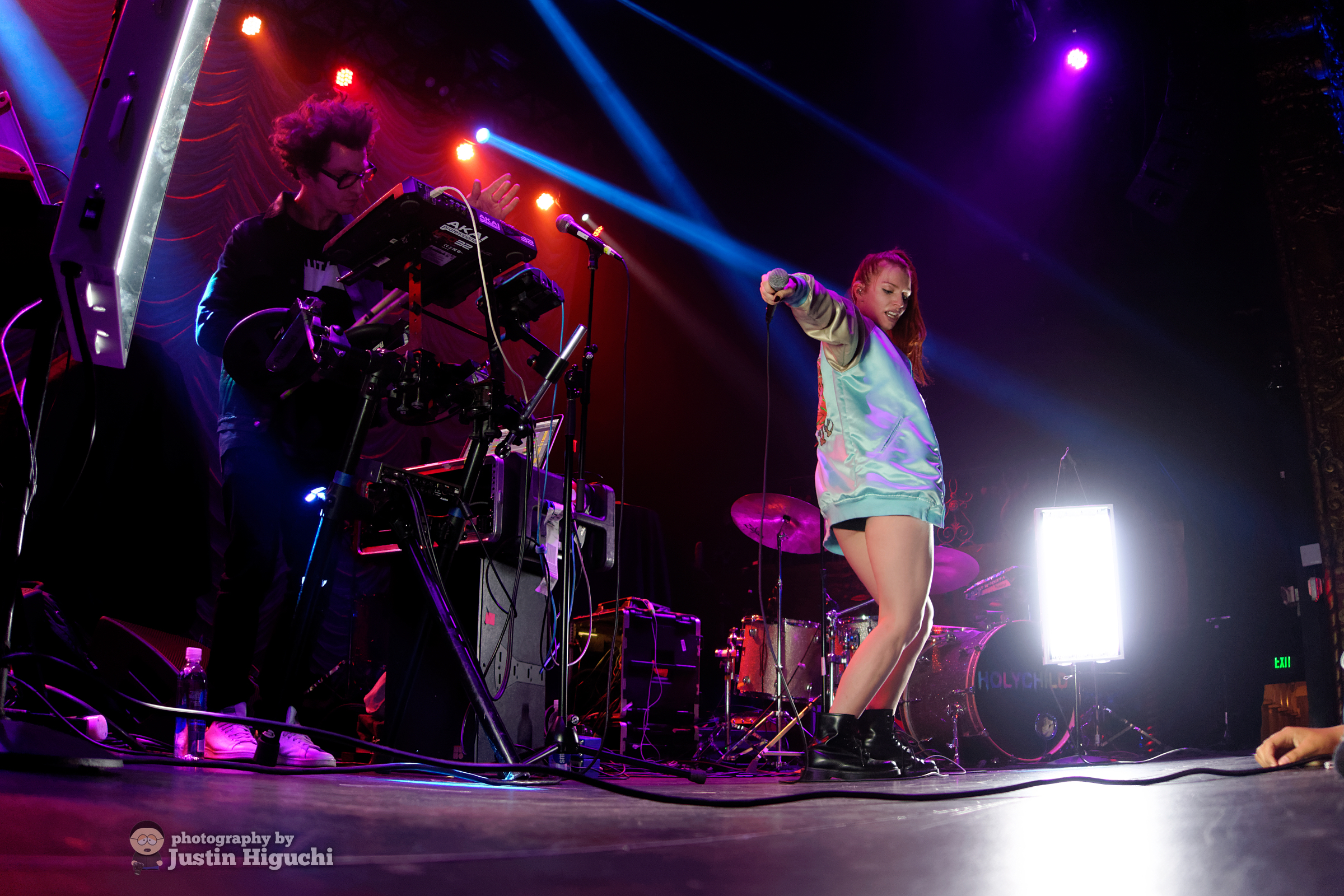

Background information
- Origin: New York City, New York, United States
- Genres: Electronic, R&B
- Years active: 2013–present
- Labels: Neon Gold Records, Tommy Boy Records
- Members: Zoe Silverman
- Past members: Adam Pallin

ASTR is the solo project of American electronic R&B vocalist Zoe Silverman, originally formed with producer Adam Pallin. Their debut EP, Varsity, was named the twentieth best album of 2014 by Spin. Their second EP, Homecoming, was released in 2015.

== History ==
ASTR formed in 2013 after meeting at a yoga class. Producer Adam Pallin was previously one half of Little Jackie alongside Imani Coppola, who had a top-twenty hit with "The World Should Revolve Around Me" in the UK Singles Chart in 2008. Zoe Silverman is the daughter of Tom Silverman, the founder of Tommy Boy Records. In their earliest press coverage, ASTR were described as "mysterious" and left unnamed, and then briefly referred to only as Zoe ASTR and Adam ASTR. A 2013 interview with The Village Voice revealed their identities, explaining that the duo had not wanted to disclose their real names in order to "distance themselves" from their backgrounds.

Their debut single "Operate" was released through Tommy Boy Records in May 2013, followed by a second single "Razor". The duo also played several sets at CMJ Music Marathon in the autumn. ASTR later released a cover of Drake's "Hold On, We're Going Home", which was a breakthrough hit on Hype Machine and compared favourably to the original.

In 2014 ASTR released their debut six-track EP, Varsity, on 21 January via Neon Gold Records. Spin later named it their twentieth best album of 2014. ASTR performed at SXSW for the first time in March 2014, and were praised as an "aural threat" by USA Today in May. ASTR also created a new song, "Hold On Me", exclusively for DJ Annie Mac's blog, and released a remix of Charli XCX's "Boom Clap" in the summer. ASTR were the first act to sign for the new independent record label 300 Entertainment.

ASTR released their second EP, Homecoming, on November 6, 2015. The track "Activate Me" was produced by Darkchild. Silverman described Homecoming as "nostalgia pop" with lyrical themes around "industry sexism". ASTR toured nationally in the month of the release. A remix of Carly Rae Jepsen's "Run Away With Me" was released in the summer of 2015, and a standalone single featuring Mick Jenkins titled "It's Over" was premiered by Billboard in September. ASTR also performed at Governors Ball in June 2015.

ASTR released a new single, "Bleeding Love", in March 2016.
