= Made4TV =

Made4tv

Studio album by Little Jackie
- Released: October 15, 2011 (USA)
- Genre: R&B
- Length: 39:28
- Label: Plush Moon Records
- Producer: Imani Coppola, Michael Mangini, Adam Pallin

Little Jackie chronology
The Stoop (2008)	Made4tv (2011)	Queen of Prospect Park (2014)

Singles from Made4tv
- 1. "Take Back the World" Released: 2012; 2. "Kiss Kiss Bang Bang" Released: 2012; 3. "31 Flavors" Released: 2012; 4. "Cock Block" Released: 2012

Made4tv is the 2011 second album released by duo Little Jackie on Coppola's Plush Moon Records label. Several of the songs on the album were produced by Michael Mangini, who had previously worked with Little Jackie's lead singer, Imani Coppola, on her debut album "Chupacabra." The album was released via BandCamp.

== Critical reception ==
Professional ratings
Review scores
Source	Rating
PopMatters	6/10 stars
The Aquarian	positive

The album garnered positive reviews from music critics. PopMatters' review, penned by Nathan Wisnicki, praised the album, commenting that the album starts off slow "but the arrangements get zestier, the lyrics get much wittier, and the singing meets its backing with a real offhand charm"as the album progresses. Roz Smith, writing for The Aquarian, likened the music to that of Macy Gray and Amy Winehouse, stating that Coppola "adds a modern R&B and jazz flare" with her vocals.

The album was included on Soul Tracks' year-end list of best albums as an honorable mention.

== Track list ==
Except where otherwise noted, all songs by Imani Coppola and Adam Pallin.

1. "Take Back the World" – 3:22
2. "31 Flavors" – (Imani Coppola / Michael Mangini / Adam Pallin) – 3:08
3. "No One Will Ever Know" – (Imani Coppola / Michael Mangini / Adam Pallin) – 3:45
4. "Cock Block" – 3:39
5. "Time of Your Life" – 3:25
6. "Kiss Kiss Bang Bang" – 3:20
7. "21st Birthday Party" – 3:13
8. "Saturday" – 3:10
9. "The Pact" – 3:08
10. "Independently Mine" – 2:43
11. "Fairy Tale Ending" – 3:15
12. "Love Will Find Me" – 3:20
13. "We Got It" – 3:18 (free bonus track on http://littlejackie.bandcamp.com/)

== Personnel ==
- Imani Coppola - songwriter, lyricist, vocals
- Adam Pallin - producer, instruments
- Michael Mangini- producer on * 31 Flavors
