= Queen of Prospect Park =

Studio album by Little Jackie
- Released: 30 September 2014
- Recorded: 2011–2014
- Studio: Various: The Oven, Long Island; Atlantic Sound Studios, Brooklyn
- Genre: Soul; pop; R&B
- Length: 32:03
- Label: Plush Moon
- Producer: Adam Pallin; Adrian Harpham; Richard Maheux; Imani Coppola; Tim Myers

Little Jackie chronology
Made4TV (2011)	Queen of Prospect Park (2014)

Singles from Queen of Prospect Park
- 1. "We Move to the Beat" Released: 2011; 2. "Lose It" Released: 2013; 3. "Sweet" Released: 2014

"Queen of Prospect Park" is the third album by indie pop/R&B duo Little Jackie. The album was released in 2014, and was met with positive reviews.

== Background and release ==
"Queen of Prospect Park" is Little Jackie's third album, following "The Stoop," their debut which spawned the UK Top 20 single "The World Should Revolve Around Me," and "Made4TV," which was a commercial disappointment and spawned no charting singles. Their second album had been released independently via PlushMoon records and via Bandcamp, a website that allows musicians to sell their music directly to fans (the group had previously released their Christmas single "All I Really Want This Christmas" in this fashion); "Queen of Prospect Park" was released in this manner as well.

The album was released digitally via Bandcamp on 30 September 2014. "Move to the Beat" and "We Got It" were used in the 2011 movie "I Don't Know How She Does It." "Lose It" was used in an episode of Grey's Anatomy.

== Critical reception ==
The album was met with widespread praise upon its release. Bust praised "Sweet" as "fizzy" and "dizzying," also praising her cover of "Dream a Little Dream of Me" but feeling that her lyrics are sometimes too powerful. Afropunk likewise praised Little Jackie's cover of "Dream a Little Dream of Me," also singling out "Cheating on You With Me" and "Move to the Beat" as highlights. Rolling Stone's Dave DiMartino also praised the album, calling Coppola's lyrics "surprisingly intelligent" and commenting that “Oprah Winfrey,” “Wait For It,” and “We Got It” "are easily among the best (songs) I’ve heard all year."

On Yahoo's "Best Albums of 2014" list, the album placed at number 2 on Dave DiMartino, the Executive Editor's, list.

== Track listing ==
All tracks written by Little Jackie.

1. Sweet – 3:45
2. Haters Club – 3:02
3. Lose It – 2:50
4. Oprah Winfrey – 3:01
5. Wait for It – 2:45
6. To the Rescue – 3:14
7. Dream a Little Dream – 2:29
8. Big Bad – 2:31
9. Cheating on You with Me – 3:23
10. It's Like That – 2:49
11. Move to the Beat – 2:43
12. We Got It – 3:16

== Personnel ==
Adapted from the album's Bandcamp page.

- Imani Coppola — production (on track 2); vocals
- Adam Pallin — production (except tracks 1 and 2)
- Tim Myers — production, mixing, mastering (on track 1)
- Adrian Harpham — production (on track 2)
- Richard Maheux — production (on track 2)
- Eber Pinheiro — mixing (except track 1)
- Fred Kevorkian — mastering (except track 1)
