= All-Amerikkkan Badass =

Studio album by Joey Badass
- Released: April 7, 2017
- Studios: The Cutting Room (New York City); D Black (Yonkers); Harley Harl's House of Hits (Brooklyn)
- Genre: Conscious hip hop
- Length: 49:42
- Labels: Pro Era; Cinematic
- Producers: 1-900; Chuck Strangers; DJ Khalil; Kirk Knight; Like; Powers Pleasant; Statik Selektah

Joey Badass chronology
| B4.Da.$$ (2015) | All-Amerikkkan Badass (2017) | 2000 (2022) |

Singles from All-Amerikkkan Badass
- 1. "Devastated" Released: May 16, 2016; 2. "Land of the Free" Released: January 20, 2017; 3. "Temptation" Released: June 13, 2017

All-Amerikkkan Badass (stylized as ALL-AMERI~~KKK~~AN BADA$$) is the second studio album by American rapper Joey Badass. It was released on April 7, 2017, through Pro Era and Cinematic Music Group. The album features guest appearances from Schoolboy Q, J. Cole, Kirk Knight, Meechy Darko, Styles P, and Chronixx. Production of the album was handled executively by Joey Badass himself and Jonny Shipes, along with 1-900 as an associate producer. Production contributions also came from Pro Era members Kirk Knight, Chuck Strangers and Powers Pleasant, as well as industry producers such as DJ Khalil and Statik Selektah.

All-Amerikkkan Badass was supported by three singles: "Devastated", "Land of the Free" and "Temptation". The album received generally positive reviews from critics and debuted at number five on the US Billboard 200.

== Background and release ==
In an interview with Tampa Bay radio station WiLD 94.1, Joey Badass spoke on the creation of the album:

This new project is very powerful. That's the best thing I can say about it: it's very strong music. It's like hella vegetables. It's hella good for you, and it's almost my hesitance with it: the fact that it's so good for you, because these kids these days want candy. 'Devastated' is almost like the organic candy because the message is still good for you.

Joey Badass revealed the importance of the release date during an interview with Angie Martinez, relating April 7 to late friend and Pro Era founder Capital Steez:

The significance of the date, 4/7, goes back to Capital STEEZ, that was a number that followed him throughout his lifetime, which he saw a lot of meaning from.

The album's title is a reference to the 2012 mixtape AmeriKKKan Korruption by the late rapper Capital Steez, which was later re-released at the five-year anniversary of the project. The titles from both projects contains an overt reference by Los Angeles-based rapper Ice Cube's first solo album AmeriKKKa's Most Wanted. In all three cases "America" was intentionally misspelled, alluding to the white supremacist movement of the Ku Klux Klan that has racially targeted African Americans and continues to influence American politics in the 21st century.

== Promotion ==
The album's lead single, "Devastated", was released on May 27, 2016. The song was produced by Powers Pleasant, Kirk Knight and Adam Pallin.

The album's second single, "Land of the Free", was released on January 20, 2017. The song was produced by Kirk Knight and Adam Pallin, both of whom produced Joey's first single. The song's accompanying music video was released on March 6, 2017, on Pro Era's YouTube account. Joey performed the single on The Late Show with Stephen Colbert on April 3, 2017.

The album's third single, "Temptation", was released to urban contemporary radio on June 13, 2017. The song was produced by 1-900 and Kirk Knight.

== Critical reception ==
Professional ratings
Aggregate scores
| Source | Rating |
|---|---|
| AnyDecentMusic? | 7.2/10 |
| Metacritic | 75/100 |
Review scores
| Source | Rating |
| AllMusic | 4/5 stars |
| The A.V. Club | B+ |
| Consequence | B |
| Drowned in Sound | 7/10 |
| Exclaim! | 8/10 |
| HipHopDX | 4.1/5 |
| Pitchfork | 6.4/10 |
| Q | 3/5 stars |
| Vice | A− |
| XXL | 4/5 |

All-Amerikkkan Badass was met with generally positive reviews. At Metacritic, which assigns a normalized rating out of 100 to reviews from mainstream publications, the album received an average score of 75, based on 15 reviews. Aggregator AnyDecentMusic? gave it 7.2 out of 10, based on their assessment of the critical consensus.

Clayton Purdom of The A.V. Club said, "He's still reaching to the golden age for inspiration, but updating it so thoroughly that we're reminded why we considered it golden in the first place". Jonathan Hatchman of Clash said, "Although refreshing, visceral and completely understandable—when listening to the whole LP, the political themes are occasionally overwhelming". Greg Whitt of Consequence said, "The 12-song project is the Brooklyn native's most well-rounded release to date". Jack Doherty of Drowned in Sound said, "The strange thing about the record is that the tracks just keep getting better and better as you go along". A. Harmony of Exclaim! said, "Courageous and passionate, Badass is a well-timed soundtrack to social and political struggle. While the album specifically chronicles the horrors of being a young black man in America, Joey articulates his angst in a way that easily resonates with anyone stumbling under the weight of oppression".

Brian Josephs of Spin said, "All-Amerikkkan Badass manages to find a balance between necessary gravity and inviting wistfulness. The message can be preachy, but the pace is conversational". Eric Diep of HipHopDX said, "All-Amerikkkan Badass shows an ample amount of growth for a socially aware rapper discussing heavy issues". Daniel Jeakins of The Line of Best Fit said, "It's concise and straight-to-the-point, with no signs of over-indulgence. In short, it's the album fans of the New York rapper always knew he was capable of making". Scott Glaysher of XXL said, "Diehard fans of Joey Badass' older, more minimalist will applaud the latter half of the album. Whereas the top half dozen songs flex Joey's evolved songwriting and beat selection, the bottom has Statik Selektah handling a few more beats and thus opening up Joey's perfect in-pocket rhyming". Matthew Strauss of Pitchfork said, "While constant one-liners were a bit leaden on B4.Da.$$, they are sorely missed on AABA". Steve Yates of Q found that Badass' music does not cover "new ground" and "remains wedded to a mid-'90s New York headnod template", while criticizing the album's excessive "mid-tempo drear".

=== Year-end lists ===
Select year-end rankings of All-Amerikkkan Badass
| Publication | List | Rank | Ref. |
|---|---|---|---|
| Complex | The Best Albums of 2017 | 18 | |
| Exclaim! | Top 10 Hip-Hop Albums of 2017 | 8 | |
| HipHopDX | Best Rap Albums of 2017 | 13 | |
| Rap-Up | 20 Best Albums of 2017 | 14 | |

== Commercial performance ==
All-Amerikkkan Badass debuted at number five on the US Billboard 200 with 51,000 album-equivalent units, of which 28,000 were pure album sales.

== Track listing ==
All-Amerikkkan Badass track listing
| No. | Title | Writer(s) | Producer(s) | Length |
|---|---|---|---|---|
| 1. | "Good Morning Amerikkka" | Jo-Vaughn Scott; Khalil Abdul-Rahman; Sam Barsh; Dan Seeff | DJ Khalil | 1:38 |
| 2. | "For My People" | Scott; Abdul-Rahman; Adam Pallin; Barsh; Seeff | DJ Khalil; 1-900^{[a]} | 3:53 |
| 3. | "Temptation" | Scott; Pallin; Kirlan Labarrie | 1-900; Kirk Knight | 4:04 |
| 4. | "Land of the Free" | Scott; Labarrie; Pallin | 1-900; Kirk Knight | 4:44 |
| 5. | "Devastated" | Scott; Labarrie; Pallin; Powers Pleasant | 1-900; Kirk Knight; Pleasant | 3:27 |
| 6. | "Y U Don't Love Me? (Miss Amerikkka)" | Scott; Pallin; Pleasant | 1-900; Pleasant | 3:19 |
| 7. | "Rockabye Baby" (featuring Schoolboy Q) | Scott; Pallin; Che Jessamy; Janko Nilović; Quincy Hanley | Chuck Strangers; 1-900; Jake Bowman^{[b]} | 3:44 |
| 8. | "Ring the Alarm" (featuring Kirk Knight, Nyck Caution and Meechy Darko) | Scott; Labarrie; Pallin; Jesse Cordasco; Dimitri Simms | Kirk Knight; 1-900 | 4:20 |
| 9. | "Super Predator" (featuring Styles P) | Scott; Patrick Baril; Trevor Duncan; Brady Watt; David Styles | Statik Selektah | 4:12 |
| 10. | "Babylon" (featuring Chronixx) | Scott; Pallin; Gabriel Stevenson; Jamar McNaughton | Like; 1-900 | 5:36 |
| 11. | "Legendary" (featuring J. Cole) | Scott; Baril; Caswell Weinbren; Andile Yenana; Jermaine Cole | Statik Selektah | 4:38 |
| 12. | "Amerikkkan Idol" | Scott; Abdul-Rahman; Barsh; Seeff | DJ Khalil | 6:12 |
| Total length: | | | | 49:42 |

Notes

- ^{^[a]} signifies a co-producer
- ^{^[b]} signifies an uncredited co-producer
- All song titles in this album, including its singles, are stylized in all capital letters (except for the featured artists). All instances of the letters "KKK" are struck through.

Sample credits

- "Devastated" contains elements of "SpottieOttieDopaliscious", written and performed by Outkast and Sleepy Brown.
- "Rockabye Baby" contains elements of "Blue Stone", written and performed by Janko Nilović.
- "Super Predator" contains elements of "Voice on the Wind", performed by Tunesville Inc. courtesy of Peer International Library Limited.
- "Legendary" contains elements of "Thembisa (The People)", performed by Andile Yenana.

== Personnel ==
Credits adapted from the album's liner notes.

Musicians

- 1-900 – keys (tracks 9, 11), guitar (track 11)
- Brady Watt – bass (track 9)
- Cas Weinbren – additional synthesizer (track 11)

Technical

- NasteeLuvzYou – recording, production (all tracks)
- John Gratton – assistance (all tracks)
- Rob Kinelski – mixing (all tracks)
- Jordon Silva – mixing assistance (all tracks)
- Tatsuya Sato – mastering (all tracks)

Additional personnel

- 1-900 – associate producer
- Christian Farrad – director of operations
- Tony Whign – art direction, design
- Gari Askew – director of photography

== Charts ==
=== Weekly charts ===
Chart performance for All-Amerikkkan Badass
| Chart (2017) | Peak position |
|---|---|
| Australian Albums (ARIA) | 19 |
| Austrian Albums (Ö3 Austria) | 71 |
| Belgian Albums (Ultratop Flanders) | 49 |
| Belgian Albums (Ultratop Wallonia) | 137 |
| Canadian Albums (Billboard) | 6 |
| Danish Albums (Hitlisten) | 30 |
| Dutch Albums (Album Top 100) | 17 |
| Finnish Albums (Suomen virallinen lista) | 31 |
| French Albums (SNEP) | 57 |
| German Albums (Offizielle Top 100) | 54 |
| Irish Albums (IRMA) | 10 |
| New Zealand Albums (RMNZ) | 11 |
| Norwegian Albums (VG-lista) | 15 |
| Scottish Albums (Official Charts) | 66 |
| Swedish Albums (Sverigetopplistan) | 19 |
| Swiss Albums (Schweizer Hitparade) | 19 |
| UK Albums (Official Charts) | 23 |
| US Billboard 200 | 5 |
| US Top R&B/Hip-Hop Albums (Billboard) | 2 |

=== Year-end charts ===
2017 year-end chart performance for All-Amerikkkan Badass
| Chart (2017) | Position |
|---|---|
| US Top R&B/Hip-Hop Albums (Billboard) | 90 |

== Certifications ==
Certifications for All-Amerikkkan Badass
| Region | Certification | Certified units/sales |
|---|---|---|
| Denmark (IFPI Danmark) | Gold | 10,000^{‡} |
^{‡} Sales+streaming figures based on certification alone.
