= Legend of a Cowgirl =

1997 single by Imani Coppola

Single by Imani Coppola

from the album Chupacabra
- Released: August 12, 1997
- Genre: Rock; pop; alternative pop
- Length: 3:44
- Label: Columbia
- Songwriters: Donovan Leitch; Imani Coppola; Michael Mangini
- Producer: Michael Mangini

Imani Coppola singles chronology
"Legend of a Cowgirl" (1997)	"I'm a Tree" (1997)

"Legend of a Cowgirl" is a song by American singer-songwriter and rapper Imani Coppola from her debut album, Chupacabra (1997). Upon its release, the song was successful, garnering favorable critical reception and peaking within the top 40 in the United States, the United Kingdom, and New Zealand. The song also entered singles charts in Australia, Belgium, Germany, and the Netherlands. The song remains Coppola's only solo top-40 hit in each of the countries, making her a one-hit-wonder (though she later re-appeared on the UK Singles Chart as part of the R&B-pop duo Little Jackie).

The song's success is largely credited to its music video, which depicted Coppola as a waitress at a diner, daydreaming about life as a cowgirl, alien, and rock star. The video became a hit on MTV, and received a nomination at Billboard's 1998 Music Video Awards, in the category of "Pop: Best New Artist Clip." The song and video have been included on retrospective "best-of" lists by VH1, Spin, and Billboard.

== Background and composition ==
Coppola wrote the song while she was in college. The lyrics were inspired by "love-life chatter" she overheard in her dorm room. The song includes cowboy and Western-related metaphors for sex, and is considered to embody female sexual independence. The song samples Donovan's "Sunshine Superman" extensively. Coppola disliked the song, calling it the worst song on Chupacabra.

== Critical reception ==
Larry Flick, writing for Billboard, gave the song a positive review upon its release, describing it as "quirky and rife with novelty value" and also praising the chorus's memorability. AllMusic's Bradley Torreano considered the song a highlight of its parent album, commenting that on the song, "her personality shines through." Entertainment Weekly's review of Chupacabra, although critical of the album overall, praised "Legend of a Cowgirl," remarking that it "works the best equestrian metaphors for sex since Ginuwine's 'Pony'," going on to deem the song "as good as it gets on her debut album." British magazine Music Week gave it four out of five, complimenting the song as a "slightly fey but genuinely catchy debut." An editor, Alan Jones, added, "Attractively anchoring a lyrically and melodically unusual track to a sample from Donovan's seminal Sixties hit "Sunshine Superman", it presents Coppola as a less rocky Sheryl Crow, setting her voice against an instrumental track that is by turns influenced by hip hop and early Seventies acts like It's a Beautiful Day." Ann Powers, writing for The New York Times, deemed the song "a sunny declaration of sexual independence that the Spice Girls would admire."

=== Accolades ===
In 1998, the music video earned a nomination at the Billboard's Music Video Awards, in the category of "Pop: Best New Artist Clip." The video ultimately lost to Natalie Imbruglia's "Torn."

The song and video have also received retrospective accolades. VH1 ranked the song at number 21 on their list of "40 Greatest One-Hit Wonders of the '90s." In 2014, Spin included the song on their list of "45 Hay-Ya! Moments in Rap and Country's Uncomfortable History," reflecting that "the Lilith-era '90s fostered a slew of quirky yet radio-ready woman-power anthems, and Imani Coppola's whiskey-swilling midnight marauder was one of the best." In October 2017, the song ranked at number 55 on Billboard's list of the 100 Best Pop Songs of 1997.

Publication	Accolade	Rank	Ref.
Billboard	The 100 Best Pop Songs of 1997	55	
Spin	45 Hay-Ya! Moments in Rap and Country's Uncomfortable History	not ranked	
VH1	40 Greatest One-Hit Wonders of the 90s	21	

== Commercial performance ==
In the United States, the song peaked at number 36 on the Billboard Hot 100 and spent a total of 20 weeks on the chart. It remained Coppola's sole appearance on the Hot 100 until 2001, when she re-appeared alongside fellow one-hit wonders the Baha Men with "You All Dat," which achieved a peak of number 94 on the chart. The song also peaked within the top 40 on the Billboard Top 40/Mainstream chart, where it reached number 21 and spent 14 weeks on the chart, and the Adult Top 40, where it peaked at number 24 and spent 20 weeks on the chart.

The song also charted throughout Europe. In the United Kingdom, the song debuted on the UK Singles Chart dated February 28, 1998, at its peak of number 32. It fell to number 47 the following week, and spent a total of three consecutive weeks on the chart; it remains her only UK chart entry. In the Netherlands, the song debuted at number 80 on the singles chart dated January 31, 1998, and eventually peaked at number 65, spending one week at its peak and a total of eight weeks in the top 100. On the German Singles Chart, the song debuted at number 99 on the chart dated March 16, 1998, and eventually achieved a peak of 94, spending a total of five weeks on the chart. On Belgium's Ultratop (Flanders) singles chart, the song debuted at number 50 on the chart dated February 28, 1998, and fell off the following week. The song also charted in New Zealand, where it peaked at number 20 and spent nine weeks on the chart.

In Oceania, the song likewise appeared on the charts. The song was successful in New Zealand, debuting at number 43 on the New Zealand Singles chart dated February 1, 1998, and peaking at number 20, spending a total of 9 weeks in the top 50. On the Australia Singles Chart, the song peaked at number 55. The single placed at number 76 on Australia's Triple J Hottest 100 songs of 1997, making Coppola one of only four solo female artists to appear on the listing that year.

"Legend of a Cowgirl" remains Coppola's only charting solo song in every country except Australia (where follow-up "I'm a Tree" peaked at number 201), effectively rendering Coppola a one-hit wonder. However, Coppola achieved some success in 2008 with programmer Adam Pallin, as the pop/R&B duo Little Jackie, whose single "The World Should Revolve Around Me" was a top 40 hit in the United Kingdom and Ireland.

== Music video ==
The song had an accompanying music video, directed by McG, who also directed videos for Korn, Cypress Hill, Sugar Ray and Barenaked Ladies among others. The video depicts Coppola as a waitress at a diner, daydreaming about life as a biker chick and '60s singer and dancing on a counter. According to Coppola, the video started as an idea she had for a movie about women who "love 'em and leave 'em and ride off into the sunset." Of the filming, Coppola stated that "it was very uncomfortable 'cause we had no room and their penises and their bums are just flopping around," says Coppola. "It was like, 'Whoops, sorry. Didn't mean to touch you!' But they were all gay, so it didn't really matter. They were cute though. It was a shame."

Upon its release, the music video for "Legend of a Cowgirl" became a hit on MTV. It spent two weeks at number 19 on the Billboard's MTV Video Monitor, and also received play on The Box.

== Personnel ==
Personnel are adapted from the Chupacabra booklet and AllMusic.

- Imani Coppola — vocals, violin
- Ross Elliott — executive producer
- Skoti Alain Elliott – engineering, mixing
- Michael Mangini — mixing, production

== Charts ==
=== Weekly charts ===
Chart (1997–1998)	Peak position
Australia (ARIA)	55
Belgium (Ultratop 50 Flanders)	50
Canada Top Singles (RPM)	14
Germany (GfK)	94
Iceland (Íslenski Listinn Topp 40)	35
Netherlands (Dutch Top 40 Tipparade)	3
Netherlands (Single Top 100)	65
New Zealand (Recorded Music NZ)	20
Scottish Singles Sales (Official Charts)	36
UK Singles (Official Charts)	32
US Billboard Hot 100	36
US Adult Pop Airplay (Billboard)	24
US Pop Airplay (Billboard)	21

=== Year-end charts ===
Chart (1997)	Position
US Top 40/Mainstream (Billboard)	77

Chart (1998)	Position
US Adult Top 40 (Billboard)	90

== Release history ==
Region	Date	Format(s)	Label(s)	Ref.
United States	August 12, 1997	CD	Columbia	
United States	August 18, 1997	Modern rock radio	Columbia	
United States	August 19, 1997	Contemporary hit radio	Columbia	
Japan	October 22, 1997	CD	Sony	
United Kingdom	February 16, 1998	CD; cassette	Columbia	
