= Rock-a-bye Baby (disambiguation) =

Rock-a-bye Baby is a nursery rhyme and lullaby.

Rock-a-bye Baby may also refer to:

- Rock-A-Bye Baby (film), a 1958 American musical comedy starring Jerry Lewis
- Rockabye Baby!, a series of CDs geared toward infants and newborns
- RockaByeBaby, a mixtape by American singer Cassie
- "Rockabye Baby" (Joey Badass song)
- "Rock-A-Bye Baby", a song by Irving Berlin
- "Rock-a-Bye Baby" (Casualty), a 1987 television episode
- "Rock-a-Bye-Baby" (NCIS: New Orleans), a 2015 television episode

== See also ==
- Rock-a-Bye Your Baby with a Dixie Melody, a popular song written by Jean Schwartz
- Rockaway Valley Railroad, also known as the "Rock-A-Bye Baby"
- Rockabye (disambiguation)
- "Rock-a-Bye Bivalve", SpongeBob SquarePants episode whose title is based on the phrase
