= Temptation (Joey Badass song) =

2017 single by Joey Badass

Single by Joey Badass

from the album All-Amerikkkan Badass
- Released: June 13, 2017
- Genre: Conscious hip hop
- Length: 4:04
- Label: Pro Era; Cinematic
- Songwriters: Jo-Vaughn Scott; Adam Pallin; Kirlan Labarrie
- Producers: 1-900; Kirk Knight

Joey Badass singles chronology
"Land of the Free" (2017)	"Temptation" (2017)	"500 Benz" (2017)

Music video
- "Temptation" on YouTube

"Temptation" is a song by American rapper Joey Badass, sent to urban contemporary radio on June 13, 2017, as the third single from his second studio album All-Amerikkkan Badass (2017). It was produced by 1-900 and Kirk Knight.

== Background and composition ==
In an interview with GQ, Joey Badass chose "Temptation" as a track from All-Amerikkkan Badass that he was particularly proud of, saying "When I made that song, instantly it was my favorite song ever. Not just out of songs that I have made, literally my favorite song ever."

The song features excerpts of nine-year-old girl Zianna Oliphant's tearful speech on police brutality to the Charlotte City Council following the killing of Keith Lamont Scott and subsequent protests. Joey stated he saw a video of the speech on Instagram and it "just really struck a chord in my heart." He added, "When I first saw it I didn't even think I was going to use it in a song, but then when 'TEMPTATION' got near the final stages I just had an idea that the video would go perfectly. I literally put it in GarageBand and mashed it up myself, and it turned out perfect."

Joey Badass includes sung vocals in the song. Lyrically, he describes feeling helpless and being tempted to engage in bad behavior due to the injustices on Black people, also begging "Tell me Lord can you help me / I said Lord can you help me?" He addresses his own experiences of being racially discriminated against, advocates for his people to improve themselves through taking action, and chides people who are "complaining all day but in the same condition" and mentally "enslaved by their religion."

== Music video ==
An official music video was released on August 14, 2017. Directed by Joey Badass himself and Nathan Smith, it sees Joey visiting his hometown of Brooklyn, opening with a grainy clip of the city from the Brooklyn Bridge. It then shows the rapper walking through a church and a group of children running home and playing with each other while the police conduct a stop-and-frisk search outside of their brownstone apartment and harass Black men on sidewalks. Badass begins rapping on the stairs of the home as his lyrics depict the lives of people in the household; he watches a mother laying down and a man in another room packing his gun with him before heading to work. Badass accompanies a little girl, taking a stroll through the neighborhood with her as they meet a group of men on the sidewalk who start dancing to the song. After dropping off the girl with her mother, Badass gives an outdoor performance with a band that is shut down by police, and joins others inside a church.

== Charts ==
Chart (2017)	Peak position
New Zealand Heatseeker Singles (RMNZ)	5

== Certifications ==
Region	Certification	Certified units/sales
Denmark (IFPI Danmark)	Gold	45,000^{‡}
New Zealand (RMNZ)	Platinum	30,000^{‡}
United Kingdom (BPI)	Silver	200,000^{‡}
United States (RIAA)	Gold	500,000^{‡}
^{‡} Sales+streaming figures based on certification alone.
