= Rockabye Baby (Joey Badass song) =

2017 single by Joey Badass featuring Schoolboy Q

Single by Joey Bada$$ featuring ScHoolboy Q

from the album ALL-AMERIKKKAN BADA$$
- Released: April 7, 2017
- Genre: Conscious hip hop; political hip hop
- Length: 3:43
- Label: Pro Era; Cinematic
- Songwriters: Jo-Vaughn Scott; Quincy Hanley; Adam Pallin; Che Jessamy; Janko Nilović
- Producers: Chuck Strangers; 1-900; Jake Bowman

"Rockabye Baby" is a song by American rapper Joey Badass, released on April 7, 2017, from his second studio album ALL-AMERIKKKAN BADA$$ (2017). It features American rapper ScHoolboy Q. Produced by Chuck Strangers and 1-900 with uncredited co-production from Jake Bowman, the song samples "Is It Him or Me" by Jackie Jackson and "Blue Stone" by Janko Nilović.

== Composition and lyrics ==
The production features New York style boom bap percussion accompanied with a piano loop, while the lyrics condemn discrimination against Black people, including institutional racism. Joey Badass raps the first verse, in which he compares himself to Muhammad Ali in his prime, before calling for peace among rival gangs such as the Crips and Bloods and revolution. He also takes aim at the President, saying "Fuck Donald Trump". The section between artists' verses contains a guitar riff, over which Schoolboy Q begins the next verse. He discusses gang culture in the East Coast such as Brooklyn and inner-city struggles, in addition to reflecting on the history of racism against Blacks in the United States.

== Critical reception ==
The song received mostly positive reviews. Rebecca Haithcoat of Pitchfork stated, "In the past, Bada$$ has taken some heat for his affinity for throwback production, but this grimy, driving, unmistakably New York boom-bappy beat serves their well. Q's whipped his style into shape, the whisper of smoke in his voice turning to gravel, the glint of playfulness in his eye going cold and his flow hardening up. It would be refreshing if occasionally Q would relax that tensed fist and allow his old singsong cadences, humorous ad-libs and melodic hooks to breathe, but on a track as flinty as 'ROCKABYE BABY,' doubling down on the edge works especially well. On the other hand, Bada$$ tends toward a looser, more laid-back delivery, but here, he sounds invigorated, ready to pounce. If ever we needed rappers riled up, it's now. May others take note." Hypebeast's Davis Huynh described the verses as "sharp" and "witty" and the production as "silky". Clash's Jonathan Hatchman regarded the song as among the "stronger" collaborations from All-Amerikkkan Badass, further writing "although Joey Bada$$'s flow is, once again, superior, the overall aggressive tone ties the verses together". Eric Diep of HipHopDX called it the "winner out of his collaborative effort", adding "But more importantly, Joey sounds right at home in Q's dark environment, with their unbounded chemistry setting them up for a bigger fan reaction if they cut another record together." Spin's Brian Josephs commented it could have been a bonus track on Blank Face LP. Patrick Taylor of RapReviews described Schoolboy Q's verse as "fierce". Jack Doherty of Drowned in Sound was less favorable of the song, describing it as "surreally sleazy" and commenting "Everything seems to be going in slow motion, it’s like you've decided to nibble some DMT at an anti-Trump rally. Everything is a bit confusing, you feel a bit queasy, but deep down you know, despite what the drugs might be telling you, that you're on the right side of the fence."

== Charts ==
Chart (2017)	Peak position
Australia (ARIA)	97
Canada Hot 100 (Billboard)	87
US Bubbling Under Hot 100 (Billboard)	10
US Hot R&B/Hip-Hop Songs (Billboard)	50
