= Virtual Sexuality =

1999 film by Nick Hurran

- Theatrical release poster
- Directed by: Nick Hurran
- Written by: Chloe Rayban; Nick Fisher
- Based on: Virtual Sexual Reality by Chloe Rayban
- Produced by: Christopher Figg
- Starring: Laura Fraser; Rupert Penry-Jones; Luke de Lacey; Kieran O'Brien
- Cinematography: Brian Tufano
- Edited by: John Richards
- Music by: Rupert Gregson-Williams
- Production companies: The Bridge; Noel Gay Motion Picture Company
- Distributed by: TriStar Pictures (through Columbia TriStar Films (UK))
- Release date: 2 July 1999 (United Kingdom)
- Running time: 92 minutes
- Country: United Kingdom
- Language: English
- Box office: $0.9 million (UK/US)

Virtual Sexuality is a 1999 film directed by Nick Hurran and starring Laura Fraser, Rupert Penry-Jones, Luke de Lacey, and Kieran O'Brien. The screenplay concerns a young woman who designs the perfect man at a virtual reality convention, but then an accident occurs causing the man to be brought to life.

== Plot summary ==
17-year-old Justine (Laura Fraser) bemoans being a virgin so, after being stood-up on a date, goes to a virtual reality exhibition with her geeky friend Chas (Luke DeLacey). There she encounters a virtual makeover machine which she uses to create a 3-D image of her perfect man. After a freak power-cut Justine finds herself inside that male body, becoming her own ideal mate (Rupert Penry-Jones). Naming this alternate self "Jake", he moves in with Chas to try and come to terms with being a teenage boy.

Jake then realises that an unaltered version of Justine is still around unaware of his existence. This unaltered Justine, on meeting Jake, falls for him unaware of the complications this poses. Jake fends her off by feigning interest in the infamous local man-eater known as "the Hoover".

A frustrated Justine then decides she must lose her virginity at any cost, and dates the arrogant Alex to achieve this. As the big date looms, Chas and Jake attempt to thwart Justine's plans, and she eventually realises she prefers the unthreatening Chas.

== Cast ==
- Laura Fraser as Justine Alice Parker
- Rupert Penry-Jones as Jake
- Luke de Lacey as Chas Lovett
- Kieran O'Brien as Alex Thorne
- Marcelle Duprey as Fran
- Natasha Bell as Isabel Yasmin 'Hoover' Clarke
- Steve John Shepherd as Jason
- Laura MacAulay as Monica
- Roger Frost as Frank Lovett
- Ruth Sheen as Jackie Lovett
- Laura Aikman as Lucy Parker
- Preeya Kalidas as Charlotte
- Ram John Holder as Declan
- Amanda Holden as the Shoe Shop Assistant
- Alan Westaway as Geoff
- William Osborne as the Sex Shop Assistant
- Philip Bird as David Parker

== Production ==
The film appears to draw some of its inspiration from 1985's Weird Science, but was based on the novel Virtual Sexual Reality (1994), which was part of Chloë Rayban's four-part "Justine" series of novels. The film was produced by The Noel Gay Motion Picture Company, who were also responsible for Trainspotting.

Filming took place in various locations around London. The internal Virtual Reality Exhibition scenes were filmed at Elstree Studios, using a purpose-built set. The tunnel was extended before filming of the explosion was done.

== Release ==
The film opened in the UK on 2 July 1999 in 199 cinemas and grossed £244,084 in its opening weekend, placing sixth at the UK box office. After two weeks it had grossed £545,000. It was released in the US on 3 December 1999 and grossed $74,007.

== Soundtrack ==
Virtual Sexuality : Music from the Motion Picture

Soundtrack album by Various artists
- Released: 1999
- Genre: Electronic; hip hop; funk; soul; blues; pop
- Length: 50:05
- Label: EMI Records

"Virtual Sexuality: Music from the Motion Picture" was released in 1999 and features an array of tracks from various artists which were included in the film. The soundtrack includes songs from Imogen Heap, All Saints, Touch and Go and Basement Jaxx, as well as music scored for the film by composer Rupert Gregson-Williams. Several lines of dialogue from the film, spoken by Laura Fraser's character, were spliced between the tracks.

=== Track listing ===
No.	Title	Writer(s)	Performer(s)	Length
1.	"Justine: OK, Here Goes"	–	–	0:29
2.	"Snow on a Hot Day"	Bertine Zetlitz, Jan Bang	Bertine Zetlitz	4:06
3.	"This Life"	Nicola Hitchcock, Saul Freeman	Mandalay	4:19
4.	"Live & Learn"	Tony Green, Chris Cawte, Dennis Johnson, Jeff Walker, Steve Turner	The Gutter Brothers	3:18
5.	"Narcissus: Welcome to Narcissus"	–	–	0:10
6.	"Would You...?"	David Lowe	Touch and Go	3:10
7.	"Conceptual"	Rupert Gregson-Williams	Rupert Gregson-Williams	1:55
8.	"Lady Marmalade ('98 Remix)"	Bob Crewe, Kenny Nolan	All Saints	4:03
9.	"Come Baby Come"	Joey Gardner, K7	K7	3:57
10.	"Justine: Mr. Right"	–	–	0:24
11.	"I'm Still Waiting"	Tony Green, Chris Cawte, Dennis Johnson, Jeff Walker, Steve Turner	The Gutter Brothers	2:48
12.	"Toy"	Moa, Eythor Arnalds	Moa	4:40
13.	"Rebuilding Narcissus"	Rupert Gregson-Williams	Rupert Gregson-Williams	3:31
14.	"Fly Life (Brix Radio Edit)"	Felix Buxton; Simon Ratcliffe	Basement Jaxx	4:04
15.	"Justine: Perfect"	–	–	0:18
16.	"Come Here Boy"	Imogen Heap	Imogen Heap	3:58
17.	"Delicious (Breakneak's James Wiltshire Edit)"	Lino "Boom" Dayupay	Kulay	3:40
18.	"Justine: A Little Romance""	–	–	0:11
19.	"Human Touch"	Darren Pearson, Liz Overs	Pocket Size	4:24

=== Omitted tracks ===
- "Karma and the Blizzard" – Imani Coppola
- "Private Dancer" – Mark Knopfler
- "Piano Concerto No. 21" – Wolfgang Amadeus Mozart
- "Fly Away" – Poe
- "Someone Like You" – Guy Fletcher, Rod Williams
- "No, No, No (Part 1) – Destiny's Child
- "Legend of a Cowgirl – Imani Coppola
- "Sunshine Superman" – Donovan
- "I Am a Tree" – Imani Coppala
  - (featuring a sample of "Soul Kitchen" – The Doors)
- "Something for Me" – A. Whitmore
