= It's Like That =

"It's Like That" may refer to:

- "It's Like That" (Run-D.M.C. song) (1983)
- "It's Like That (My Big Brother), a song by Redman
- "It's Like That" (Mariah Carey song) (2005)
- "It's Like That", a song by Evan Taubenfeld from Welcome to the Blacklist Club
- "It's Like That", a song by Jay-Z from Vol. 2... Hard Knock Life
- "It's Like That", a song by Little Jackie from Queen of Prospect Park
- "It's Like That", a song by Pete Rock & CL Smooth from Mecca and the Soul Brother
