= Rockabye =

Rockabye may refer to:

- Rockabye (1932 film), starring Constance Bennett and Joel McCrea
- Rockabye (1986 film), starring Jimmy Smits and Valerie Bertinelli
- "Rockabye" (song), a 2016 song by Clean Bandit featuring Sean Paul and Anne-Marie
- Rockabye (album), a 1992 album by Robin Holcomb, or the title track
- "Rockabye" (Law & Order: Special Victims Unit), a 2005 episode of Law & Order: Special Victims Unit

== See also ==
- "Rock-A-Bye", a 2005 song by Black Buddafly
- Rockaby, a 1980 play by Samuel Beckett
- Rock-a-bye Baby (disambiguation)
- "Lullaby" (Shawn Mullins song), commonly incorrectly referred to as "Rockabye"
- "The Rockabye", a 1993 song by Revolting Cocks
