= Land of the Free (song) =

2017 single by Joey Badass

Single by Joey Bada$$

from the album ALL-AMERIKKKAN BADA$$
- Released: January 20, 2017
- Recorded: 2016–2017
- Genre: Hip hop; political hip hop
- Length: 4:44
- Label: Pro Era; Cinematic
- Songwriter(s): Jo-Vaughn Scott; Adam Pallin; Kirlan Labarrie
- Producer(s): Kirk Knight; Adam Pallin

Joey Bada$ singles chronology
"Front & Center" (2016)	"Land of the Free" (2017)	"Temptation" (2017)

Music video
- "Land Of The Free" on YouTube

"Land of the Free" is a song by American hip hop recording artist Joey Bada$$. It was released on January 20, 2017, by Pro Era and Cinematic Music Group, as the second single from his second studio album, ALL-AMERIKKKAN BADA$$. The song was produced by Kirk Knight and Adam Pallin.

== Background and release ==
In an interview with Genius, Joey Bada$$ spoke on the release of the song, saying it was a "triple significance". He said his fans know about his interest to "play with dates" and he thought it was the "perfect" timing since it was his birthday, the second anniversary of his debut album and the inauguration of Donald Trump.

He performed the song on the Late Show With Stephen Colbert. The song was seen as a political statement by Bada$$ on Donald Trump, as one of the lines in the lyrics contained "Sorry, America, but I will not be your soldier. Obama just wasn't enough – I need some more closure". His view on Trump is also addressed more directly through the following lyric, "And Donald Trump is not equipped to take this country over."

== Music video ==
The song's accompanying music video, co-directed by Bada$$ and Nathan Smith, was released on March 6, 2017 on Pro Era's YouTube account.

In the video, Bada$$, in a windy meadow at a desert, alternates between speaking to a group of children and standing in solidarity with a group of adults with their chained hands, following with a firing squad consisting of police officers and businessmen, who shoot several of the prisoners. The video concludes with Ku Klux Klan members standing before a burning cross."
