= Anywhere but Here (novel) =

Novel by Mona Simpson

Anywhere But Here
- Hardcover
- Author: Mona Simpson
- Language: English
- Genre: Autobiographical fiction
- Publisher: Knopf
- Publication date: December 1986
- Publication place: United States
- Media type: Print (Hardcover)
- Pages: 406
- ISBN: 0-394-55283-0
- Dewey Decimal: 813/.54
- LC Class: PS3569.I5117 A8 1987
- Followed by: The Lost Father

Anywhere but Here is a novel written by American novelist Mona Simpson. The book was a commercial success and earned the author the Whiting Prize for her first novel. The book was adapted by Alvin Sargent into a major motion picture of the same name in 1999. The film starred Susan Sarandon and Natalie Portman, and was directed by Wayne Wang.

== Plot ==
Adele August leaves her second husband, Ted, and taking her 11-year-old daughter Ann, drives in Ted's Lincoln Continental from their small Wisconsin hometown to Los Angeles with ambitions of making Ann a child star and finding herself a rich husband. Ann, the child of Adele's first marriage to an Egyptian man who deserted the family, is separated from her beloved grandmother Lillian who remained in Wisconsin, and must now cope on her own with her mother's moods, whims, fantasies, and occasional neglect and abuse. Narcissistic Adele is chronically dissatisfied with her life, lives above her means, overspends on clothing and status goods, and treats Ann as an extension of herself, rather than as a person in her own right. Ann is torn between feelings of love, longing and responsibility for her mother on one hand, and anger and rebellion on the other.

In Los Angeles, Adele finds work as a teacher and, despite her low income and irresponsible spending habits, manages to move herself and Ann into Beverly Hills so that Ann can attend the local schools with the children of rich families and movie stars. The two engage in various schemes to stay in Beverly Hills and fit in, including skipping out on rent and stealing fashionable clothing. Over time, Ann befriends several of her rich classmates, while Adele, increasingly out of her element, exploits Ann's school connections to benefit herself. Back in Wisconsin, Ann's grandmother Lillian and her cousin Benny both die, severing Ann's last links with her old life.

After a failed affair with a wealthy dentist, Adele shows signs of mental disturbance; she fantasizes that her psychiatrist is in love with her, and begins to physically abuse the now-teenage Ann. Ann finally gets a role in a TV series, which enables her to escape her mother and attend an East Coast university. Ann avoids visiting Adele for years, but sends home money earned through her TV work, ostensibly for Adele to buy a house in California. When Ann finally does visit her mother, she finds that Adele spent the money on a new sports car rather than the house, in keeping with Adele's unwillingness to accept a settled fate.

== Film adaptation ==
In 1998, 20th Century Fox greenlit a feature film adaptation of Simpson's novel. The screenplay was written by Alvin Sargent and the movie was directed by Wayne Wang. Susan Sarandon and Natalie Portman were cast as Adele and Ann, respectively. The film debuted at the Toronto Film Festival on September 17, 1999, before being released on November 12, opening at #5 at the North American box office and making US$5.6 million in its opening weekend. Portman was nominated for a Golden Globe Award for the role.

== Sequel ==
Simpson wrote a sequel, The Lost Father, which tells the story of Ann, now on her own, and her search for her father.
