= Mona Simpson =

American novelist (born 1957)

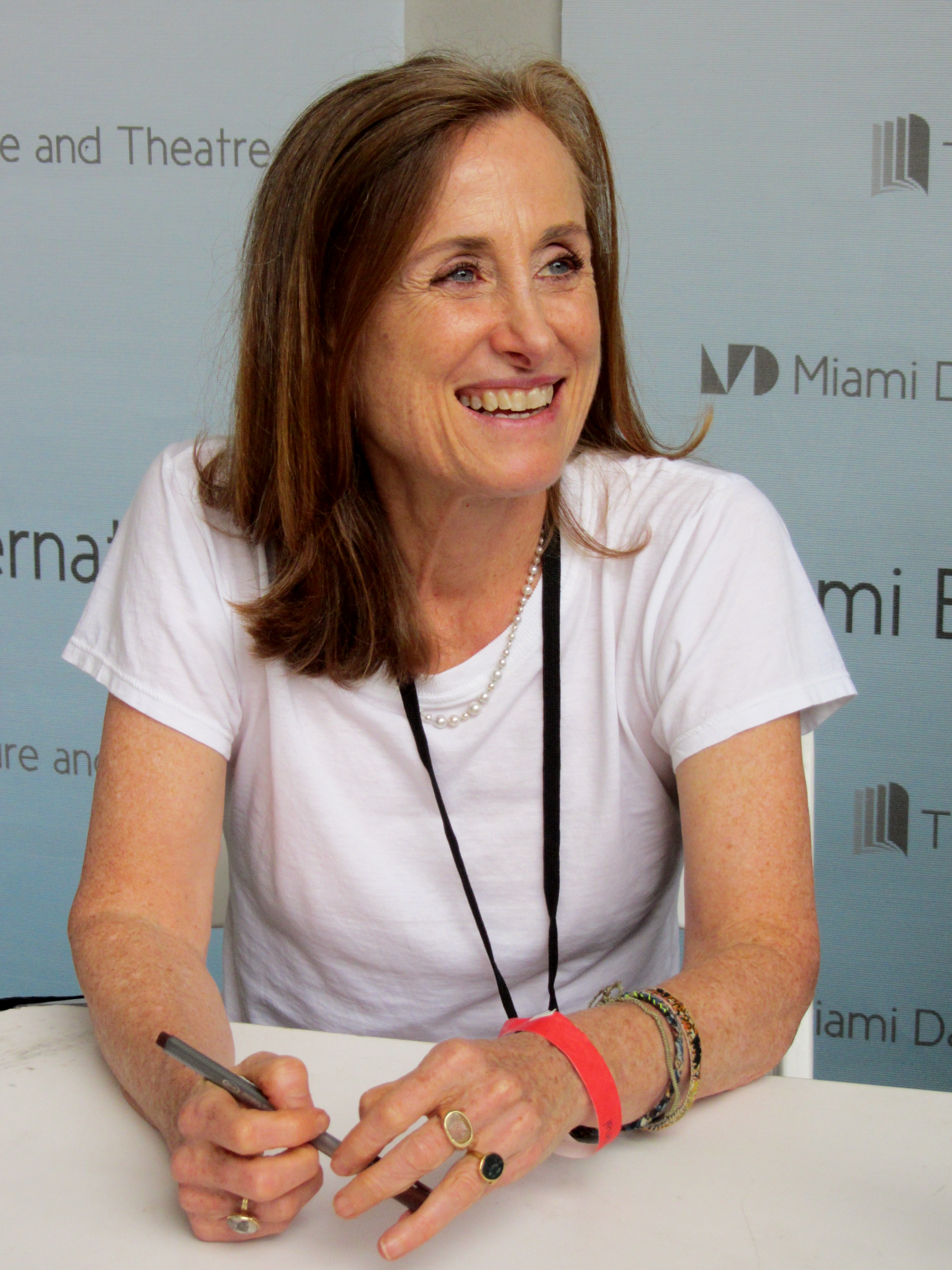
- Simpson in 2014
- Born: Mona Elizabeth Jandali; June 14, 1957 (age 69); Green Bay, Wisconsin, U.S.
- Education: University of California, Berkeley (BA); Columbia University (MFA)
- Spouse: Richard Appel (m. 1993; div. 2012)
- Children: 2
- Relatives: Steve Jobs (brother); Lisa Brennan-Jobs (niece); Reed Jobs (nephew); Eve Jobs (niece); Laurene Powell Jobs (sister-in-law); Bassma Al Jandaly (cousin); Malek Jandali (cousin)
- Website: monasimpson.com

Mona Elizabeth Simpson (née Jandali; born June 14, 1957) is an American novelist. She has written six novels and studied English at University of California, Berkeley, and languages and literature at Columbia University. She won a Whiting Award for her first novel, Anywhere but Here (1986). It was a popular success and adapted as a film by the same name, released in 1999. She wrote a sequel, The Lost Father (1992). Critical recognition has included the Chicago Tribune Heartland Prize and making the shortlist for the PEN/Faulkner Award for her novel Off Keck Road (2000).

She is the biological younger sister of the late Apple co-founder Steve Jobs. She was born after her parents had married and did not meet Jobs, who was placed for adoption after he was born, until she was 25 years old.

== Early life ==
Mona Jandali was born on June 14, 1957, in Green Bay, Wisconsin, to a Swiss-German American mother, Joanne Carole Schieble, and a Syrian father, Abdulfattah "John" Jandali (Arabic: عبد الفتاح الجندلي). While Jandali and Schieble were still unmarried students at the University of Wisconsin in 1954, Schieble became pregnant and, given her parents' resistance to the relationship, decided to place the baby for adoption. Six months after she placed the baby for adoption, Schieble's father died, and she then wed Jandali and gave birth to Mona. They divorced in 1962. When Schieble remarried, both she and Mona took the name of her new husband, George Simpson. In 1971, after they divorced, Schieble took Mona to Los Angeles and raised her on her own.

Simpson described herself as a good student as a child but was also "a clown" and "a smart aleck" who used to make jokes in class. "I did get in trouble a lot when I was older and then I didn't like school so much anymore." She attended Beverly Hills High School and received a scholarship to attend the University of California, Berkeley, where she studied poetry: "I stuck with poetry as long as I could—as far as my talent would take me." After she finished her B.A. at Berkeley, she worked at a job during the days and worked as a journalist during the nights and on the weekends. She enjoyed journalism and hoped for a position with the California Independent & Gazette (Richmond, California) but did not receive it. She then attended graduate school at Columbia University and received her M.F.A from there. While a student at Columbia University, she was an editor for Paris Review.

In 1986, Schieble was contacted by the son she had given up for adoption, Steve Jobs, who had recently lost his mother to lung cancer. Until then, Simpson had been unaware that she had an older brother. Schieble then arranged for Jobs and Simpson to meet in New York where Simpson worked. The two became good friends, and worked together to locate their father, eventually locating Jandali in Sacramento. Simpson later fictionalized the search for their father in the 1992 novel, The Lost Father. (She would create a fictionalized portrait of Jobs in the 1996 novel, A Regular Guy.)

In 1994, Simpson returned to the Los Angeles area with her then-husband, Richard Appel. In 2001, Simpson started teaching creative writing at UCLA; she also has an appointment at Bard College in New York state.

== Novels ==
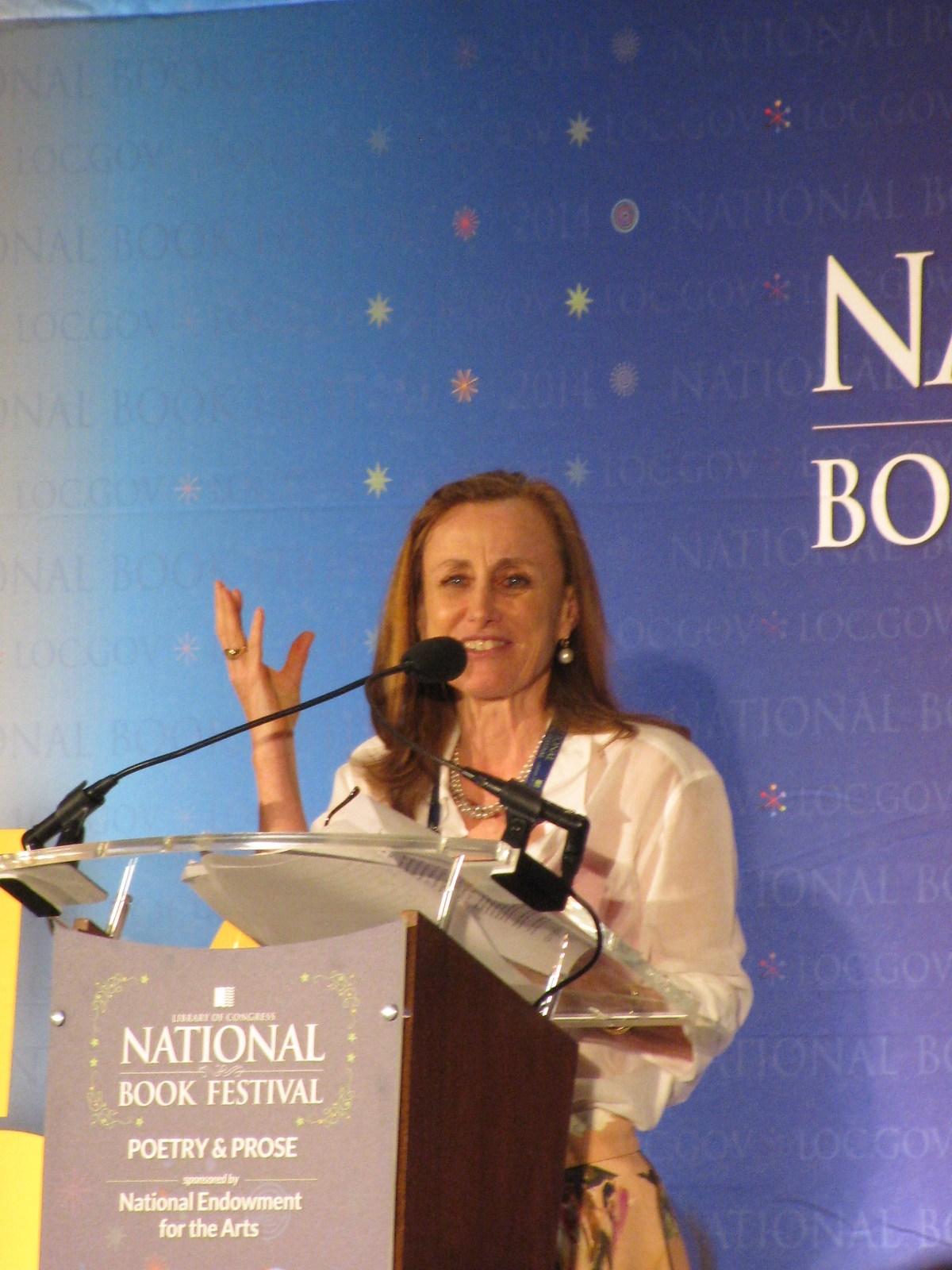
Simpson at the National Book Festival in January 2014

Simpson's novels are drawn from life experiences. Her first novel, Anywhere But Here (1986), was a critical and popular success, winning a Whiting Award. In describing her intentions for the novel, Simpson stated:

I wanted to write about American mythologies, American yearnings that might be responses, delayed or exaggerated but in some way typical, to the political and social truths of our part of the world in our century. But I wrote very personally about one family. I think it takes a long time before a crisis—like AIDS—enters the culture to a point where responses exist in a character, where personal gestures are both individual and resonant in a larger way.

It was adapted as the 1999 film Anywhere But Here, starring Susan Sarandon and Natalie Portman. Simpson published a sequel, The Lost Father (1992).

A Regular Guy (1996) explores the strained relationship of a Silicon Valley tycoon with a daughter born out of wedlock, whom he did not acknowledge. Off Keck Road (2000), portraying decades in the lives of three women in the Midwest, was a finalist for the PEN/Faulkner Award and won the Chicago Tribune Heartland Prize. Stacey D'Erasmo said, "Off Keck Road marks the place where origin leaves off and improvisation begins". My Hollywood was published in 2011. It explores the complex relationships, issues of class, and perspectives of two women, Claire, a European-American composer in her 30s and mother of one son, and Lola, her immigrant nanny from the Philippines. The nanny supports her own five children in the Philippines. The novel alternates between the voices of the two women, contrasting their worlds.

== Personal life ==
Simpson married television writer and producer Richard Appel in 1993 and had two children. Appel, a writer for The Simpsons, named Homer Simpson's mother Mona Simpson after his wife, beginning with the episode "Mother Simpson". They later divorced. Simpson's paternal cousins include Malek Jandali and Bassma Al Jandaly.

== Works ==
=== Novels ===
- Anywhere But Here (1986) ISBN 0-394-55283-0
- The Lost Father (1992) ISBN 0-394-58916-5
- A Regular Guy (1996) ISBN 0-679-45091-2
- Off Keck Road (2000) ISBN 0-375-41010-4
- My Hollywood (2010) ISBN 978-0-307-27352-9
- Casebook (2014) ISBN 9780345807281
- Commitment (2023) ISBN 9780593319277

=== Short stories ===
- Simpson, Mona (Winter 1983). "Approximations". Ploughshares. 9 (4): 54–66. JSTOR 40349126. (JSTOR login required)
- Simpson, Mona (Fall 1984). "Lawns". The Iowa Review. 14 (3): 80–98. doi:10.17077/0021-065X.3116. (Free to read/download under creative commons license)
- Simpson, Mona (Winter 1986). "Lonnie Tishman". Ploughshares. 12 (4): 115–136. JSTOR 40349520. (JSTOR login required)
- "Victory Mills". Granta (24 (Inside Intelligence)). Summer 1988. (Subscription Required)
- "Ramadan". Granta (37 (The Family Fiction)). Autumn 1991. (Subscription Required)
- Simpson, Mona (Fall 1992). "Van Castle". Ploughshares. 18 (18:2/3): 132–150. JSTOR 40351324. (JSTOR login required)
- "The Driving Child". Granta (54 (Best of Young American Novelists)). Summer 1996. (Subscription Required)
- Simpson, Mona (Fall 1998). "Unidealized, Twenty-Eight". Ploughshares. 24 (24:2/3): 164–181. JSTOR 40380935. (JSTOR login required)
- "Holiday". Granta (128 (American Wild)). Autumn 2014. (Subscription Required)

=== Essays ===
- "A Sister's Eulogy for Steve Jobs." The New York Times, October 30, 2011.

== Awards ==
- 1986, Whiting Award
- 1987, Hodder Fellowship (Princeton University)
- 1988, Guggenheim Fellowship
- 1995, Lila Wallace Reader's Digest Fellowship
- 2001, Chicago Tribune Heartland Prize
- 2001, Finalist: PEN/Faulkner award
- 2008, Literature Award from the American Academy of Arts and Letters
