= Free Spirit (Imani Coppola album) =

Studio album by Imani Coppola
- Released: January 25, 2010

Imani Coppola chronology
The Black & White Album (2007)	Free Spirit (2010)	Imani's Magic Chicken Soup EP (2011)

Free Spirit is an album released on January 25, 2010, by the American singer and violinist Imani Coppola as a free download on her website. She describes the album as "Free organic music 100% made by me. No preservatives."

== Track listing ==
1. "Already Famous" – 3:18
2. "Daylight Savings" – 4:59
3. "Dis Re-appear" – 3:50
4. "Ed Ora Deve Morire" – 2:05
5. "Fearless Firefly" – 5:02
6. "Feed Me the Truth" – 2:00
7. "Free Will" – 3:28
8. "Help the Residents" – 4:49
9. "Listen" – 1:24
10. "Lunatic" – 5:34
11. "Mission to Mars" – 7:25
12. "Nothing" – 4:02
13. "Ok OK" – 1:41
14. "Suckin the Devil's Dick" – 2:55
