= The Lost Father =

1992 novel by Mona Simpson

- First edition
- Author: Mona Simpson
- Language: English
- Genre: Fiction
- Publisher: Knopf
- Publication date: January 11, 1993
- Publication place: US
- Media type: print/digital
- Pages: 506
- ISBN: 9780679733034
- Preceded by: Anywhere But Here (novel)

The Lost Father is a novel written by American novelist Mona Simpson. It is Simpson's second novel, and is a sequel to her first, Anywhere But Here. The novel describes the protagonist's search for the father who abandoned her and her mother years before.

Like Simpson's other novels, it shares elements with her own life. Simpson's own father, Abdulfattah "John" Jandali, was, like the father in the novel, a college professor who disappeared from her life and that of her mother, Joanne Carole Schieble, when Simpson was a child. Simpson reestablished contact with him as an adult. However, in interviews, Simpson has emphasised the fictional nature of her work, with real-life elements transformed by the research and writing process.

Jandali and Schieble were also Steve Jobs' birth parents, having given him up for adoption before Simpson was born, although nothing of this appears in the novel.

== Plot ==
The novel picks up the story of the protagonist of Anywhere But Here, now distanced from her mother and going by the name Mayan rather than Ann. She is 28 and a medical student in New York City when she decides to search for the father who abandoned her and her mother. Unlike the father in Anywhere But Here, who was a vacuum cleaner salesman, Mohammed John Atassi is a college teacher. He was born in Egypt and is a gambler and womaniser. Mayan hires private detectives and simultaneously conducts her own search. The quest becomes obsessive, and takes her across the USA and to the Middle East, where she finds his family, who have lost contact with him. She eventually finds Atassi in Modesto, where he manages a restaurant, unaware that his departure had such an effect on his daughter.

== Reception ==
The New York Times called the novel "a dense, absorbing narrative, a narrative so rich in emotional and physical details that one finishes the book with the sense of having known Mayan her entire life" and found that it "ratifies the achievement of Anywhere but Here, attesting to its author's possession of both a dazzling literary gift and uncommon emotional wisdom."

The Los Angeles Times praised its "enormous, sensitive and highly imaginative detail" and "rich human comedy in its most serious sense" but found it overlong, with long periods where the search barely creeps forward, and Mayan's insight often turning to self-involvement.

Kirkus Reviews was harsher, describing it as "overly long, repetitive, often irritating" and finding that "Mayan's obsession and emotional pitch almost always ring true, but cannot sustain this bulky, much-anticipated novel."
