= Pocket Size =

Pocket Size is the name of a duo from England, featuring producer Darren Pearson and singer Liz Overs. In 1999 they hit No. 1 on the US Billboard Hot Dance Music/Club Play chart with "Walking" on Atlantic Records.

In 1999, their album 100% Human was released by Atlantic Records.

"Walking" was used on the soundtrack for the 1999 film Anywhere but Here. Their track "Human Touch" was used on the opening credits of an episode of Charmed and in the British film Virtual Sexuality.

Pearson and Overs later began making music inspired by the landscape, legend and folklore of the County of Sussex in the UK where they live as Chalk Horse Music. In 2018 they self-produced an album entitled I See Fairisies.

== Discography ==
- "Squashy Lemon Squeezy" (Single, 1998, EMI)
- "Walking" (Single, 1999, Atlantic Records)
- 100% Human (Album, 1999, Atlantic Records)

== See also ==
- List of number-one dance hits (United States)
- List of artists who reached number one on the US Dance chart
