= Anywhere but Here (film) =

1999 comedy-drama film directed by Wayne Wang

Anywhere But Here
- Theatrical release poster
- Directed by: Wayne Wang
- Screenplay by: Alvin Sargent
- Based on: Anywhere but Here by Mona Simpson
- Produced by: Laurence Mark
- Starring: Susan Sarandon; Natalie Portman; Bonnie Bedelia; Shawn Hatosy; Hart Bochner
- Cinematography: Roger Deakins
- Edited by: Nicholas C. Smith
- Music by: Danny Elfman
- Distributed by: 20th Century Fox
- Release dates: September 12, 1999 (TIFF); November 12, 1999 (United States)
- Running time: 114 minutes
- Country: United States
- Language: English
- Budget: $23 million
- Box office: $23.6 million

Anywhere but Here is a 1999 American coming-of-age comedy drama film based on the novel of the same name by Mona Simpson. It was directed by Wayne Wang from a screenplay by Alvin Sargent, and stars Susan Sarandon, Natalie Portman, and Shawn Hatosy.

The film debuted at the Toronto International Film Festival on September 17, 1999, before being released in the United States on November 12.

== Plot ==
Adele August and her reluctant teenage daughter, Ann, leave their small town in Wisconsin and move to Beverly Hills. Adele hopes Ann will become a Hollywood actress despite Ann's interest in going to Brown University. They rent a run-down apartment and Adele becomes a speech-language pathologist at a high school in a bad part of town.

While at the beach one afternoon, Adele meets a handsome orthodontist, Josh; they date and have sex, leaving Adele to fall in love with him, but he later dumps her for a younger woman. Adele improvises day to day, often unable to pay bills, and eventually quits her job. Adele and Ann spend their days hanging out together but over time, Ann grows tired of her mother's eccentric behavior and dreams of running away.

Ann's cousin Benny arrives in Los Angeles for a visit. Upon his return home, Adele is notified that Benny has tragically died in a car accident, leaving Ann distraught. They attend his funeral in Bay City, and Adele argues with her intoxicated brother-in-law. Back home, Ann begins dating her crush, Peter, interested in experiencing sex for the first time after she turns seventeen. Her friends also help her reach out to her estranged father, but he isn't pleased to hear from her.

Meanwhile, Adele gets a new job in a care home as a speech therapist and gives makeup and style tips to its elderly residents. Ann works part-time in a supermarket and attends acting auditions, but continues to emphasize her desire to go to Brown. Adele rejects the idea, telling her they cannot afford the tuition. However, soon, Adele sells her expensive Mercedes and decides to help her, eventually accepting her dream.

Adele and Ann part ways at the airport as Ann goes off to college. They express their love for one another, and Ann admits that, even though her mother drives her crazy, she cannot imagine life without her.

== Cast ==
- Susan Sarandon as Adele August
- Natalie Portman as Ann August
- Bonnie Bedelia as Carol
- Shawn Hatosy as Benny
- Hart Bochner as Josh Spritzer
- Caroline Aaron as Gail Letterfine
- Corbin Allred as Peter
- John Diehl as Jimmy
- Paul Guilfoyle as George Franklin
- John Carroll Lynch as Jack Irwin
- Eileen Ryan as Lillian
- Heather DeLoach as Ellen
- Ashley Johnson as Sarah
- Heather McComb as Janice
- Elisabeth Moss as Rachel
- Michael Milhoan as Cop
- Rachel Wilson as Sylvia
- Ray Baker as Ted
- Thora Birch as Mary (Uncredited)

== Production ==
Mona Simpson's novel Anywhere but Here was first optioned by Disney in the late 1980s and envisioned as a star vehicle for Meryl Streep, but Streep chose to do Postcards from the Edge instead and the adaptation did not materialize. The project stalled for nearly a decade until 20th Century Fox revived it and cast Susan Sarandon as the lead. Natalie Portman became attached to star as the co-lead and left her role on Broadway's The Diary of Anne Frank to commit to the film. However, Portman, who was then 17, said she would not do the film if it required her to do a love scene with nudity. Sarandon, who had co-star approval, made Portman's casting a condition of her own participation. Alvin Sargent did a rewrite of the scene, enabling Portman's involvement.

Director Wayne Wang initially kept some of the book's darker elements in the film, such as a suggestion of domestic abuse. Test audiences reacted negatively to this version, so Wang and Sargent went with a version that softened the dynamics of Adele and Ann's relationship.

The film was primarily shot in Los Angeles locations, including Beverly Hills High School, the Beverly Hills Hotel, LAX Airport, and Westwood Village.

== Release ==
Anywhere But Here was slated for a spring of 1999 release, but Fox deemed the film not ready for release until that September. Fox then set an October 22 release date, which ultimately changed to November 12.

=== Box office ===
The film opened at #5 at the North American box office and made $5.6 million USD in its opening weekend.

=== Critical reception ===
The film received positive reviews from critics. On Rotten Tomatoes, it has a score of 63% based on reviews from 89 critics. The website's consensus reads: "The strong chemistry between Susan Sarandon and Natalie Portman as a mother and daughter trying to make a fresh start in L.A. helps to elevate Anywhere But Here above its occasional forays into melodrama." Metacritic, which uses a weighted average, assigned the film a score of 59 out of 100, based on 33 critics, indicating "mixed or average" reviews.

Roger Ebert of the Chicago Sun-Times gave the film three stars and noted "The movie's interest is not in the plot, which is episodic and 'colorful,' but in the performances. Sarandon bravely makes Adele into a person who is borderline insufferable. Sarandon's role is trickier and more difficult, but Portman's will get the attention. In 'Anywhere But Here,' she gets yanked along by her out-of-control mother, and her best scenes are when she fights back, not emotionally, but with incisive observations."

=== Accolades ===
Golden Globe Awards

- Nominated - Best Performance by an Actress in a Supporting Role in a Motion Picture - Natalie Portman

Young Artist Awards

- Nominated - Best Performance in a Feature Film - Leading Young Actress - Natalie Portman

Hollywood Makeup Artist and Hair Stylist Guild Awards

- Nominated - Best Contemporary Hair Styling (Feature) - Paul LeBlanc

== Soundtrack ==
Anywhere But Here: Music from the Motion Picture

Soundtrack album by Various Artists
- Released: November 2, 1999
- Genre: Pop
- Length: 59:25
- Label: Atlantic/Wea.
- Producers: Danny Elfman, Steve Power, Lisa Loeb, Michael Beinhorn, Malcolm Burn, Marius de Vries, Joe Hardy, Jay Joyce, k.d. lang, Pierre Marchand, Rick Nowels, Carmen Rizzo, Glenn Rosenstein, Don Was, Wilbur C. Rimes, Ellen Segal, Pocket Size, Billy Harvey

Singles from Anywhere But Here: Music from the Motion Picture
- 1. "Leaving's Not Leaving" Released: September 28, 1999

Professional ratings
Review scores
Source	Rating
AllMusic	3/5 stars

A soundtrack to the film was released on November 2, 1999, ten days before the theatrical release. The soundtrack was distributed by Atlantic Records and Wea.

The soundtrack features original music by Lisa Loeb, Bif Naked, Danny Elfman, and k.d. lang. It also featured tracks by artists such as LeAnn Rimes, Sarah McLachlan, and Pocket Size, as well as other various artists. Rimes' song, "Leaving's Not Leaving", was released as a B-side track with her single, "Big Deal", on September 28, 1999.

No.	Title	Writer(s)	Recording artist(s)	Length
1.	"Anywhere But Here"		k.d. lang	3:45
2.	"Walking"		Pocket Size	4:14
3.	"Scream and Shout"		21st Century Girls	3:25
4.	"Leaving's Not Leaving"	Diane Warren	LeAnn Rimes	4:53
5.	"I Wish"		Lisa Loeb	2:27
6.	"Free"		Marie Wilson	3:56
7.	"Amity"		Carly Simon and Sally Taylor	3:17
8.	"Ice Cream"		Sarah McLachlan	2:43
9.	"Furniture"		Kacy Crowley	3:29
10.	"Twisted Road"		Patty Griffin	2:48
11.	"Strange Wind"		Poe	3:59
12.	"Everything Around Me Is Changing"		Sinéad Lohan	4:42
13.	"Come Here"		Lili Haydn, Rick Boston	4:22
14.	"Chotee"		Bif Naked	3:50
15.	"Anywhere But Here Score Suite"		Danny Elfman	7:35
Total length:				59:25

== Home media ==
Anywhere but Here was released on DVD and VHS on October 31, 2000.
