= The Black & White Album =

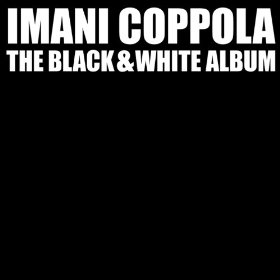

Studio album by Imani Coppola
- Released: November 6, 2007 (US); November 5, 2007 (UK)
- Recorded: 2006–2007
- Genre: Hip hop, alternative rock, electropop
- Length: 42:23
- Label: Ipecac Recordings
- Producer: Imani Coppola, Josh Valleau

Imani Coppola chronology
The Vocal Stylings Of Imani Coppola (2004)	The Black & White Album (2007)	Free Spirit (2010)

The Black & White Album is the eighth solo album from American singer-songwriter and violinist Imani Coppola. It was released on the Mike Patton-owned Ipecac Recordings in 2007, her first for the label. The album included the singles "Woke Up White", "Springtime", and "I Love Your Hair." Only one video ("Woke Up White") was released. Although Coppola had previously self-released several albums, The Black & White Album was only her third to be released by a record label – following her debut album, Chupacabra, from a decade earlier.

== Release ==
The album was released on November 6, 2007, by Ipecac Records, which had been started by Faith No More's frontman, Mike Patton. The album was Coppola's first in a decade to receive widespread release, and only her second, since 1997's Chupacabra.

== Critical reception ==
Professional ratings
Aggregate scores
Source	Rating
Album of the Year	75/100
Review scores
Source	Rating
Allmusic	3/5 stars
Entertainment Weekly	B+
NME	7/10
PopMatters	9/10 stars
The Skinny	4/5 stars

Upon its release, the album garnered favorable reviews from music critics, earning a score of 75/100 on the review aggregate site Album of the Year. Mikael Wood, writing for Entertainment Weekly, awarded the album a grade of "B+" and compared Coppola's "eccentricity" to that of Macy Gray, also noting the record's topical range and commending the diverse assortment of genres: "ska, rap, electro-pop, and punk." AllMusic's Marisa Brown awarded the album 3 stars (out of 5).

Spin included the lead single "Woke Up White" on their list of "Songs You Need to Download Now!" in their November 2007 issue. Meanwhile, Entertainment Weekly gave single "Raindrops from the Sun (Hey Hey Hey)" a rave review, with contributor Michael Sleazak calling the song "an exceedingly catchy little ditty, one that builds and builds and builds till you want to stand up at your desk and join in that final chorus."

== Track listing ==
1. "Black & White Jingle #1" 2:17 (Imani Coppola)
2. "Springtime" 4:58 (Coppola)
3. "Woke Up White" 2:16 (Coppola, Josh Valleau)
4. "Raindrops from the Sun (Hey Hey Hey)" 3:33 (Coppola, Valleau)
5. "30th Birthday" (feat. J. Martin Coppola & Pete Miser) 4:24 (I. Coppola, Valleau, Pete Miser, J. Martin Coppola)
6. "Let It Kill You" 3:39 (Coppola, Valleau)
7. "Dirty Pictures" 3:36 (Coppola, Valleau)
8. "Keys 2 Your Ass" (feat. Rahzel) 3:46 (Coppola, Valleau, Rahzel Brown)
9. "Black & White Jingle #2" 1:26 (Coppola)
10. "I Love Your Hair" 4:05 (Coppola)
11. "J.L.I.a.T.o.Y.O." 3:36 (Coppola, Valleau)
12. "I'm a Pocket" 2:24 (Coppola, Valleau)
13. "This is My Chicken" 0:12 (Coppola)
14. "In a Room" 2:17 (Coppola, Valleau)

== Personnel ==
- Imani Coppola – Main Vocal, Acoustic & Bass Guitars, Violin, Keyboards, Synthesizers, Synthesized Bass, DX-7, Acoustic, Fender Rhodes & Wurlitzer Electric Pianos, Drums, Percussion, Drum Programming
- Josh Valleau – Announcer, Synthesized Voices, Electric & Bass Guitars, Keyboards, Synthesizers, Hammond & B-3 Organs, Drums, Percussion, Drum Programming, Turntables
- Pete Miser – Vocals on track 05.
- J. Martin Coppola – Vocals on track 05.
- "Amanda" – Vocals
- Michael Burns – Bass
- Rahzel – Beat Boxing on track 08.
- John Altieri – Trumpet & Tuba
- Alex Elena – Drums, Percussion
