= Little Jackie =

American musical duo

- Origin: New York City, New York, U.S.
- Genres: Indie pop, R&B
- Years active: 2008–present
- Labels: S-Curve
- Members: Imani Coppola (vocalist); Adam Pallin (programmer/producer)
- Website: www.myspace.com/littlejackiemusic

Little Jackie is an American musical duo consisting of Imani Coppola and Adam Pallin. Little Jackie, which derives its name from the 1989 hit song "Little Jackie Wants to Be a Star" by Lisa Lisa and Cult Jam, released a hit single in 2008 called "The World Should Revolve Around Me" from their debut album The Stoop.

== Background ==
Coppola was a solo singer, whose most successful single was "Legend of a Cowgirl", from the 1997 album Chupacabra. Adam Pallin is the programmer and producer of the duo.

In 2008, Coppola and Pallin signed a contract with S-Curve, an independent label owned by Steve Greenberg, to release an album. This coincided with the duo's television debut on Late Night with Conan O'Brien. Coppola originally signed as a solo act with Columbia Records.

On August 3, 2011 Little Jackie digitally released their second album, Made4TV, on Bandcamp. They digitally released their third album, Queen of Prospect Park, in 2014. They released an EP Nothing Worth Listening To Part 1: I Don't Need a Therapist I Have Keith on August 22, 2022. It was followed by the EP Nothing Worth Listening To Part 2: I Don't Need a Dating App, I Have Imani on September 6, 2022. A four song Christmas EP titled It's Skipmas! was released in December 2024.

== Discography ==
Studio albums
Year	Title	Chart peak positions
Year	Title	UK
2008	The Stoop: Released on July 8, 2008	138
2011	Made4TV: Released on October 15, 2011	-
2014	Queen of Prospect Park: Released on September 30, 2014	-

EPs
Year	Title	Chart peak positions
Year	Title	UK
2022	Nothing Worth Listening To Part 1: I Don't Need a Therapist I Have Keith: Released on August 22, 2022	
2022	Nothing Worth Listening To Part 2: I Don't Need a Dating App, I Have Imani: Released on September 6, 2022	
2024	It's Skipmas!: Released on December 24, 2024	-

Singles
Year	Single	Chart peak positions		Album
Year	Single	UK	IRL	Album
2008	"The World Should Revolve Around Me"	14	30	The Stoop
2008	"The Stoop"	-	-	The Stoop
2009	"All I Really Want for Christmas"	-	-	It's Skipmas!
2011	"Move to the Beat"	-	-	Queen of Prospect Park
2012	"Take Back the World	-	-	Made4TV
2012	"Kiss Kiss Bang Bang"	-	-	Made4TV
2012	"31 Flavors"	-	-	Made4TV
2012	"Cock Block"	-	-	Made4TV
2013	"Saturday"	-	-	Made4TV
2013	"Lose It"	-	-	Queen of Prospect Park
2013	"Mrs. Claus"	-	-	It's Skipmas!
2014	"Sweet"	-	-	Queen of Prospect Park
2022	"Vaginamite"	-	-	Nothing Worth Listening To Part 2: I Don't Need a Dating App, I Have Imani
