= Chupacabra (album) =

Studio album by Imani Coppola
- Released: October 28, 1997
- Recorded: 1997
- Genre: Pop
- Length: 59:48
- Label: Columbia
- Producer: Michael Mangini

Imani Coppola chronology
| Chupacabra (1997) | Come and Get Me...What?! (2000) |

Singles from Chupacabra
- 1. "Legend of a Cowgirl" Released: 1997; 2. "I'm a Tree" Released: 1997

Chupacabra is the debut album by American singer-songwriter and violinist Imani Coppola, released on October 28, 1997. The title refers to the legendary chupacabra, a creature believed through some parts of the Americas to drink the blood of livestock. The album achieved some success upon its release, receiving positive reviews from some music critics and entering album charts in the United States and the United Kingdom.

The album's lead single, "Legend of a Cowgirl", gained popularity in 1997, becoming a top 40 hit in the United States, the United Kingdom, and New Zealand. The song also charted throughout Europe, and went into strong rotation on MTV. The album's second single, "I'm a Tree," was far less commercially successful, peaking outside the top 200 in Australia and failing to chart anyplace else. The song later appeared in several movies.

== Background ==
Coppola was still in school when she wrote much of the album. Her sister's boyfriend introduced her to Michael Mangini, a record producer known for his work with Digable Planets. Coppola and Mangini recorded a demo album together, which caught the attention of several record labels; a bidding war ensued. When naming the album, Coppola believed that "chupacabra" meant "alien," and was dismayed to discover that her debut album's name actually meant "goat-sucker."

== Release ==
"Legend of a Cowgirl" was released as the first single from the album. It peaked within the top 40 in the United States, the United Kingdom, and New Zealand. According to Coppola, the rap song, which includes a sample of Donovan's "Sunshine Superman", started as an idea she had for a movie about women who "love 'em and leave 'em and ride off into the sunset." Part of Coppola's marketing included a music video for "Legend of a Cowgirl" that went into rotation on MTV, MTV2, and VH1 in October 1997.

"I'm a Tree" was released as the second single from the album. The song, samples the Doors' "Soul Kitchen." Its music video depicted Coppola in an elevator as it goes up in an office building. Though the song failed to chart in the US or the UK, it was featured in several movies, including the 1999 films Superstar and Virtual Sexuality as well as the 2001 film Someone Like You... It peaked at number 201 on Australia's ARIA chart. The video also went into rotation on MTV En Espanol.

== Reception ==
=== Critical ===
Professional ratings
Review scores
| Source | Rating |
|---|---|
| AllMusic | 4/5 stars |
| Entertainment Weekly | C |
| Music Week | 3/5 stars |

Upon its release, the album received positive reviews from music critics, who praised the album's diversity and Coppola's vocal performance and rapping. Entertainment Weekly's review, written by Matt Diehl, was negative, commenting that "Coppola's folk-rapping forges the missing link between Missy Elliott and Bob Dylan, which results in a forced eclec- ticism." In contrast, Bradley Torreano's review for AllMusic was highly positive, stating that "The frantic rhythms mesh nicely with her rich voice on tracks like 'I'm a Tree' and 'Soon (I Like It)' while her personality shines through on the pleasantly egotistical 'It's All About Me, Me, and Me' and on the Donovan-sampled 'Legend of a Cowgirl.'" Ann Powers was similarly impressed by the album, writing in The New York Times that Coppola's album was buoyed by "fanciful raps and supple vocals as she establishes her identity as a modern-day flower child with common sense." A review in Billboard opined that the album "showcases her gift for razor-sharp urban portraits and up-to-the-minute musical tableaux that flirt with hip-hop, pop, dance, and alternative rock." The review went on to liken Coppola to Beck and Dionne Farris but opined that Coppola's "rich musical vocabulary risk(s) confusion among format-minded listeners."

=== Commercial ===
Upon its release, the album achieved some success in the United States and the United Kingdom. In the US, the album debuted on the Billboard Heatseekers Albums chart dated January 17, 1998, at number 47; it spent a total of one week on the chart. In the United Kingdom, the album also achieved minor success, peaking at number 128 on the UK Albums Chart.

== Track listing ==
All tracks by Imani Coppola, Michael Mangini except where noted

1. "I'm a Tree" – 3:33
2. "Legend of a Cowgirl" (Imani Coppola, Donovan Leitch, Mangini) – 3:47
3. "Naked City (Love to See U Shine)" – 4:26
4. "It's All About Me, Me, and Me" – 4:12
5. "Piece" – 3:48
6. "Karma and the Blizzard" – 4:37
7. "One of These Days" – 3:20
8. "Pigeon Penelope" – 3:19
9. "Soon (I Like It)" – 4:10
10. "Forget Myself" – 3:49
11. "La Da Da" – 20:47 (contains the hidden track "My Day")

== Personnel ==
Adapted from AllMusic and liner notes for Chupacabra.

- Amanda Busto – background vocals
- Imani Coppola – acoustic guitar, fiddle, guitar, strings, arrangement, keyboards, vocals, background vocals, choir, chorus, Fender Rhodes, illustrations
- Jeff Coppola – vocals
- Tom Coyne – mastering
- Dave Crafa – guitar
- DJ Nastee – DJ
- David Drafa – guitar
- Skoti Alain Elliott – bass, engineering, mixing
- Sharon Kearney – guitar, mixing assistance, assistant
- Kiku – art direction, design
- Michael Mangini – acoustic guitar, guitar, percussion, strings, arrangement, electric guitar, keyboards, background vocals, production, mixing
- Carl Rushing – programming, vocals
- Matthew Scannell – guitar
- Nina Schultz – photography

== Charts ==
| Chart (1997–98) | Peak position |
|---|---|
| UK Albums Chart | 128 |
| US Heatseekers Albums (Billboard) | 47 |
