= The Stoop (album) =

Studio album by Little Jackie
- Released: July 8, 2008 (USA); September 1, 2008 (UK); September 5, 2008 (Ireland)
- Genre: R&B
- Length: 34:00
- Label: S-Curve
- Producers: Imani Coppola, Michael Mangini, Adam Pallin

Little Jackie chronology
The Stoop (2008)	Made4TV (2011)

Singles from The Stoop
- 1. "The World Should Revolve Around Me" Released: 2008; 2. "The Stoop" Released: 2008

The Stoop is the debut studio album released by duo Little Jackie, released on July 8, 2008 by S-Curve Records. The album's lead single, "The World Should Revolve Around Me", achieved international success, reaching number 90 on the US Pop 100 and peaking within the top 30 on the UK Singles Chart and the Irish Singles Chart. The album itself did not fare as well on the UK Albums Chart, where it peaked at number 138. The album garnered generally favorable reviews upon its release. Critics were generally favorable in their assessments of the album, praising the lyrics and production.

== Composition and songwriting ==
Singer-songwriter Imani Coppola and programmer Adam Pallin, who make up the duo, recorded the album separately. Pallin felt that the process was mutually beneficial, noting the pairing "between what the music suggests and what she does lyrically. It probably wouldn't have come together the way it did if we had worked in the same room together."

Adam Pallin reflected that the song "28 Butts", about a woman wasting her life, was pivotal to the album with respect to its vibe, which helped set the tone for the rest. Coppola says that in terms of the lyrics she had to tone herself down, as she was "going through a little angry phase, getting in touch with my inner whore."

The lyrics were deemed "bitter" by Billboard. "Cryin' for the Queen" was widely interpreted as a criticism of Amy Winehouse. However, NPR's Marc Hirsh commented that "the issue isn't that New York is so much flyer than London, so much as that Winehouse's trainwreckery has squandered whatever goodwill she once claimed in the colonies." In a 2008 interview with VH1, Coppola stated "I don't want her to die; I just want her to be okay. I struggled a very long time to get into the position I am in today [...] so it's really just disrespectful and disgraceful to everyone – this golden opportunity, just destroying yourself." NPR made the song its "Song of the Day" for January 19, 2009.

In "Go Hard or Go Home" Coppola talked about deep family scars without self-pity and that the title track of the album captures both the "comforts and craziness of home" even for those who might not "have a Brooklyn stoop to sit on." According to Coppola, "The World Should Revolve Around Me," the first single and video off the album, was inspired by a break-up, and talking about people's need for space, reflecting the kind of thing that people say when they are angry that they might later regret.

== Critical reception ==
Professional ratings
Review scores
Source	Rating
AllMusic	4/5 stars
Billboard	positive
Ebony	positive
The Guardian	3/5 stars
The New York Times	Positive
Spin	2.5/5 stars

The album was met with mostly positive reviews from music critics. The New York Times praised the songwriting as "modern and quick-tongued" with "insouciant, articulate takes on relationships in various stages of disaster". Associated Press indicated that the music was "contemporary and classic", with a "funky Motown vibe mixed with hip-hop beats". Billboard called the album an excellent debut and said Imani Coppola's fans would be pleased by the "bubbly blend of swinging hip-hop rhythms, bright R&B horns and sassy soul-siren vocals." Salon said that the album provided "a perfect soundtrack for a lazy summer day" and that Coppola has a "knack for satire." Blues & Soul spoke about the music having "A bittersweet musical vibe that combines a respectful nod to the soulful Motown rhythms of the past with a sneer to the many social and cultural issues that consume today's public." Ebony's Adrienne Samuels praised the album's harmonies and lyrical range, although she expressed some concern that the harmonies "get a little stale after the first three songs." Nonetheless, Samuels concluded, "the album is a worthy listen." People commented that, were it not for Amy Winehouse's Back to Black, The Stoop "might have been truly groundbreaking."

Some critics were more skeptical of the album. A review by Jude Rogers for The Guardian felt that while "In terms of pop's major aims, 'The Stoop' is practically a perfect record," the songwriting was often too harsh and that "Coppola trips over" the "fine line between songs about sassy, female independence and old-fashioned arrogance" regularly. Spin awarded the album two and a half stars (out of five) and praised the title track, but felt that for much of the album Coppola sounds like "a confessional folkie playing funky dress-up."

== Commercial performance ==
The album achieved limited success, peaking at number 138 on the United Kingdom Albums chart. The album's lead single, "The World Should Revolve Around Me," became a hit. It peaked at number 14 on the UK Singles Chart, number 30 on the Irish Singles Chart, and number 90 on the Billboard Pop 100.

== Use in media ==
The song "The Stoop" appears in the 2009 movie The Final Destination and an episode of 90210 and in New York Goes To Hollywood when Little Jackie asked for Tiffany Pollard's help (New York) to record backing vocals. The song "28 Butts" appears in a season 4 episode of Criminal Minds (titled '52 Pickup').

== Track listing ==
All tracks are written by Imani Coppola, Michael Mangini and Adam Pallin, except where noted.

No.	Title	Length
1.	"The Stoop"	2:53
2.	"The World Should Revolve Around Me" (Coppola, Mangini, Willie Mitchell, Pallin, Early Randle)	3:01
3.	"28 Butts"	3:08
4.	"Guys Like When Girls Kiss"	3:39
5.	"I Liked You Better Before"	3:58
6.	"LOL"	2:46
7.	"Crying for the Queen"	3:25
8.	"Black Barbie"	3:21
9.	"One Love"	2:35
10.	"The Kitchen"	2:29
11.	"Go Hard or Go Home"	2:45

== Charts ==
Chart (2008)	Peak position
UK Albums Chart (OCC)	138

== Personnel ==
Adapted credits from the liner notes of The Stoop.

- Howie Bend – keyboards, engineer, mixing
- Imani Coppola – vocals, producer
- Serban Ghenea – mixing
- David Gorman – art direction
- Alex Hamlin – horn
- Mike Mangini – producer, mixing
- Adam Pallin – bass guitar, keyboards, programming
- Jared Tankel – horn
- Tiffany Pollard – backing vocals
