= Andile Yenana =

South African pianist

Andile Yenana is a South African pianist. He made an indelible mark by switching from teaching to studying jazz. He has produced and worked with many South African as well as international artists.

== Early years ==
Born in 1968 in King William's Town, Andile's love for music was triggered at an early age. He grew up in a household where music was really loved. His father, Felix Thamsanqa Yenana, had a huge collection of music, ranging from jazz to Motown, and other forms of urban black music and this had a huge influence in Andile's life. Andile took up music studies under Darius Brubeck at the University of Natal's School of Jazz and Popular Music It was here that he became friends with saxophonist Zim Ngqawana and trumpeter Feya Faku.

He joined Zim Ngqawana quartet and worked with Zim Ngqawana on all 5 of his albums, including San Song recorded with Bjorn Ole Solburg and his Norwegian San Ensemble. He has also worked on the pan-African music project Mahube with saxophonist Steve Dyer and others. He has also worked as arranger for Sibongile Khumalo, Gloria Bosman and Suthukazi Arosi. In 2005 he was selected as the 2005 Standard Bank Young Artist for Jazz.

== Discography ==
- We Used To Dance (2002)
- Who's Got The Map? (2005)
- One Night At The Market Theatre (with the Azania Dreaming Big Band, 2021)
