= Devastated (Joey Badass song) =

Single by Joey Badass

Single by Joey Bada$$

from the album ALL-AMERIKKKAN BADA$$
- Released: May 26, 2016
- Recorded: 2015
- Genre: Hip hop; pop rap; R&B
- Length: 3:28
- Label: Pro Era; Cinematic
- Songwriters: Jo-Vaughn Scott; Powers Pleasant; Kirlan Labarrie; Adam Pallin
- Producers: Powers Pleasant; Kirk Knight; Adam Pallin

Joey Bada$$ singles chronology
"Brooklyn's Own" (2016)	"Devastated" (2016)	"Front & Center" (2016)

Music video
- "Devastated" on YouTube

"Devastated" is a song by American hip hop recording artist Joey Bada$$. It was released on May 27, 2016 by Pro Era and Cinematic Music Group, as the first single from his album, ALL-AMERIKKKAN BADA$$. The song was produced by Powers Pleasant, Kirk Knight and Adam Pallin.

== Background and release ==
Joey first previewed "Devastated" at Coachella on April 16, 2016. In the song Joey discusses his pre-fame problems, and how he was "devastated" because he had not blown up. He shares a resilient message about turning his struggles into a strength. In January 2018, "Devastated" became Joey's first single to reached platinum certification.

== Music video ==
The song's accompanying music video was directed by OG Swank & Shomi Patwary and it was premiered on August 10, 2016, via Joey's YouTube account. Since its release, the video has received over 38 million views.

== Charts ==
Chart (2016)	Peak position
US Bubbling Under Hot 100 (Billboard)	25
US Hot R&B/Hip-Hop Songs (Billboard)	47

== Certifications ==
Region	Certification	Certified units/sales
Canada (Music Canada)	Platinum	80,000^{‡}
Denmark (IFPI Danmark)	Gold	45,000^{‡}
New Zealand (RMNZ)	Platinum	30,000^{‡}
United States (RIAA)	2× Platinum	2,000,000^{‡}
^{‡} Sales+streaming figures based on certification alone.
