= Imani Coppola =

American singer-songwriter

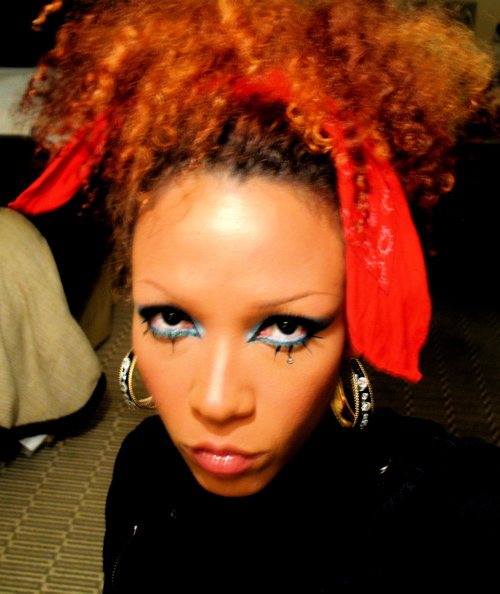
- Coppola, in 2007, backstage before a concert with Peeping Tom

Background information
- Born: Imani Francesca Coppola; April 6, 1978 (age 48)
- Origin: New York City, United States
- Genres: Contemporary R&B; Alternative R&B
- Occupation: Singer
- Instruments: Vocals, violin, acoustic guitar, keyboard
- Years active: 1997–present
- Labels: Columbia; Ipecac; independent; Plush Moon Records
- Website: URL https://imanicoppola.bandcamp.com/

Imani Francesca Coppola (born April 6, 1978) is an American singer-songwriter and violinist. Her debut single "Legend of a Cowgirl" reached the top 40 on the Billboard Hot 100 and the UK Singles Chart in 1997. Her debut album, Chupacabra, released by Columbia Records, was praised by critics and appeared on the US Heatseekers Albums chart. In 2001, Coppola appeared as a guest artist on the Baha Men single "You All Dat", which broke the top 10 in Australia and gave Coppola her second entry on the Billboard Hot 100 to date.

Coppola released several independently recorded albums in the early 2000s and starred in the musical film The Singing Biologist, for which she also wrote the music. In 2007, she was signed to Ipecac Records, and the same year released The Black & White Album, which received favorable reviews from music critics and marked a comeback for Coppola. The following year, she formed the pop/R&B duo Little Jackie with programmer Adam Pallin. Their debut single, "The World Should Revolve Around Me", reached the top 40 in the United Kingdom and Ireland, was used as the theme for the VH1 reality TV series New York Goes to Hollywood, and peaked at number 90 on the Billboard Pop 100 airplay chart. The duo's debut album, The Stoop, was released by S-Curve in 2008, but peaked outside of the top 100 in the United Kingdom, and the duo were dropped from the label. Following The Stoop, Coppola released two more solo records: The Glass Wall, in 2012, and Hypocrites, in 2017. In addition to her solo work, Coppola has recorded two further albums as part of Little Jackie: Made4TV, in 2011, and Queen of Prospect Park, in 2014.

== Early life and education ==
Coppola grew up as the second-youngest of five children on Long Island, New York. Coppola's lower-income family, headed by an African-American mother and Italian father, did not fit in, and she and her family were picked on. Her circumstances encouraged her independence and also her creativity, as her family, who received welfare, had little money to pay for entertainment. Her mother, a teacher, was the primary income earner, while her carpenter father was often out of work and refused to earn an income from his art.

Coppola grew up surrounded by music, as her father is a jazz musician, her mother plays bass, and all of her siblings are musicians as well. She recalled, in an interview with Amplifier magazine, that her first musical memory is of her father, who was her biggest musical influence, playing the song "Bessie's Blues" "on a severely out of tune piano". She began playing violin at the age of six, eventually studying studio composition at the State University of New York at Purchase. She was not happy and left after one year.

== Career ==
=== 1997–1999: Early success ===
During her time at college, Coppola made some demos and played them to music publisher Ross Elliot, the boyfriend of her older sister Maya. Elliot connected Coppola with producer Michael Mangini, known for his work with Digable Planets. While still in college, Coppola cut three demo tracks with Digable Planets that resulted in a bidding war for the artist among other labels. Coppola accepted a recording contract with Columbia Records in 1997.

In 1997, Coppola released her debut single, "Legend of a Cowgirl". The song entered the top 40 on the Billboard Hot 100 within weeks of its release, eventually peaking at number 36 and spending a total of 20 weeks in the top 100. The single also achieved some success internationally, peaking within the top 40 in New Zealand and the United Kingdom and also charting in Belgium, Germany, and the Netherlands. The song's accompanying music video became a hit as well, going into rotation on MTV and earning a nomination at the 1998 Billboard Music Video Awards, in the category of Best New Artist Clip: Pop. (The video eventually lost to Natalie Imbrulia's "Torn".)

Coppola's debut album, Chupacabra, was released in October 1997. The album elicited rave reviews from music critics, who favorably compared Coppola's music to that of De La Soul and Neneh Cherry. The album achieved a peak of number 47 on the Billboard Heatseekers Albums chart dated January 17, 1998, three months after the album's release. it spent a total of one week on the chart. The album also charted in the UK, where it peaked at number 138 on the UK Albums Chart. The album spawned a second single, "I'm a Tree", which samples The Doors' "Soul Kitchen". The song was unsuccessful, peaking only in Australia, where it reached number 201. That year, Coppola played Lilith Fair, although she was vocal about her opinion of Lilith founder Sarah McLachlan before the tour, indicating that she felt McLachlan was "boring to watch live". Coppola remarked that "I think she's a good songwriter, at times, and singer. She's boring to watch live, though."

=== 2000–2006: Independent career ===
Columbia Records dropped her in 2000, subsequently shelving her second studio album, Come and Get Me... What?! Coppola had been frustrated that the label wanted her to sample other artists when she wanted to compose her music entirely by herself. Then 22, Coppola felt she needed to learn considerably more about music and art. Never having performed beyond high school musical theater, Coppola felt she had achieved success too easily, without truly working for it.

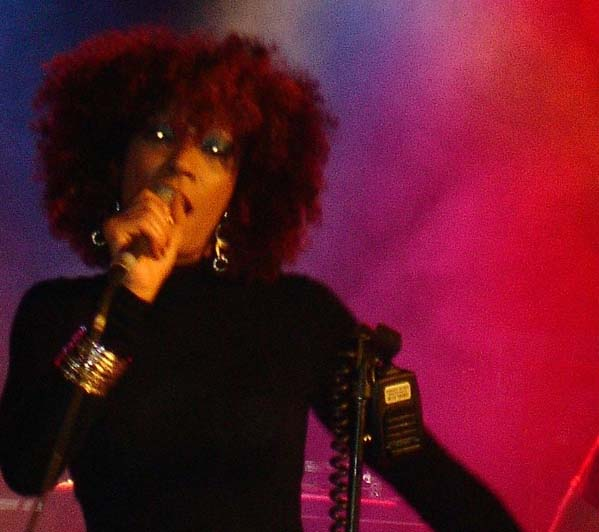
Coppola sings at a show in Milan in November 2007.

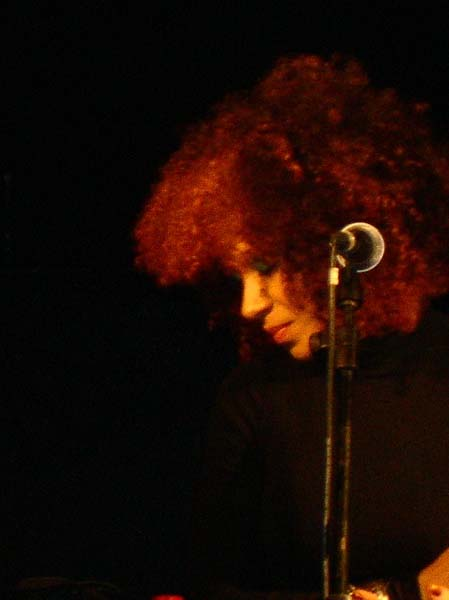
Coppola in concert with Peeping Tom, Milan in November 2006.

In 2001, she was featured on a single by the Baha Men, titled "You All Dat". The song, which was produced by Michael Mangini (who had previously produced Coppola's debut album), was successful upon its release, becoming a top 10 hit in Australia, where it peaked at number 8, giving Coppola her first top 10 hit in that region; it achieved a peak of 21 in New Zealand. In the United States, the song entered the Billboard Hot 100, where it peaked at number 94. It became Coppola's last US chart entry as a solo artist.

The single also achieved success throughout Europe: it became a top 40 hit on the UK Singles Chart, where it achieved a peak of number 14, and on the Irish Singles Chart, on which it peaked at number 26. The song also charted in Austria, Germany, Sweden, and Switzerland.

Without a major label behind her, Coppola started recording music at home in 2001; that same year, Coppola was part of the band supporting Sandra Bernhard in her off-Broadway production of The Love Machine. During this time, Coppola also starred in a movie, The Singing Biologist, playing Rose, the titular character. In 2004, Coppola released Afrodite, a neo-funk record that Vibe retrospectively deemed "excellent". By 2004, Coppola was playing acoustic guitar in small clubs like Forum in New York City with her drummer Alex Elana, in the Two Shadow Posse. These performances were not well-attended, and Coppola hated performing them. During this time period, Coppola fell into poverty and was forced to move to Staten Island.

In 2005, she launched her own website and opened an online music store where she sold her independent albums; she decorated and packaged each copy of the album by hand. In that year, she also co-wrote the title track on Maia Sharp's Fine Upstanding Citizen, which Out Magazine deemed the album's strongest track. The following year, she contributed a song, titled "Woodstock", to American vocalist Alice Russell's debut album, For Lovers, Dreamers, and Me. In May of that year, Coppola performed with Peeping Tom on Late Night with Conan O'Brien. Subsequently, she went on tour with the band. In an interview with Erin Broadley in November 2007, Coppola indicated that she had enjoyed the experience of working with Patton and other artists, which she found artistically open.

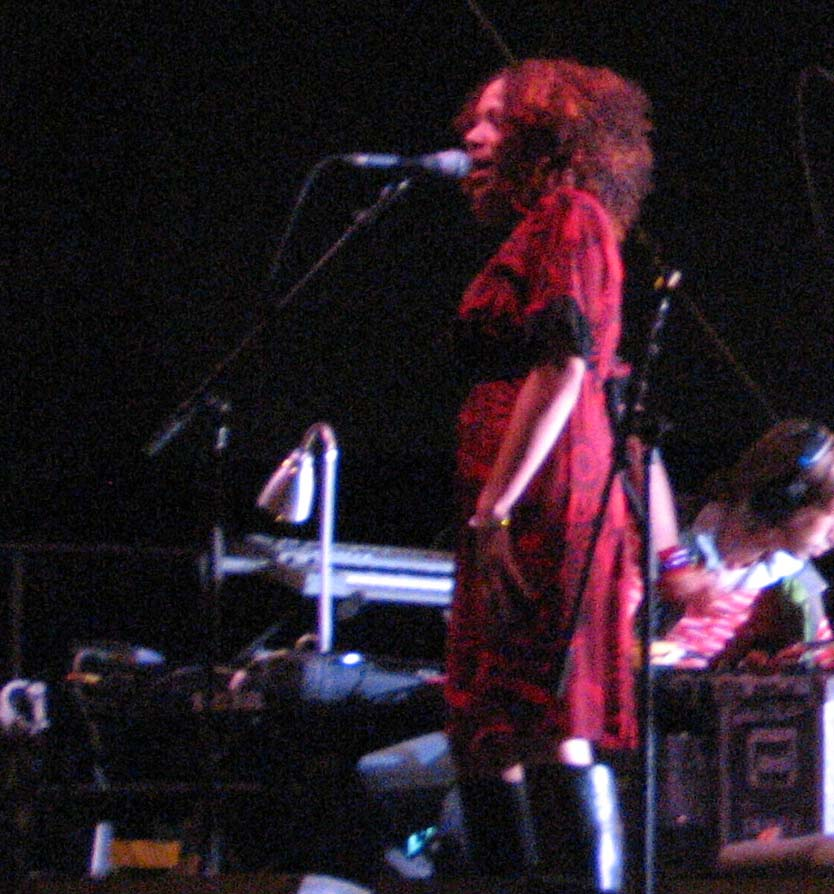
Coppola sings at a show on tour with Mike Patton's Peeping Tom at the Detour Festival in October 2006.

=== 2007–2009: The Black & White Album ===
In 2007, Coppola was signed to Ipecac Recordings, which was started by Faith No More frontman Mike Patton. In November of that year, the label released Coppola's eighth studio album, The Black & White Album, her first "easily available release" since her debut album, released a decade before, according to AllMusic. Upon its release, the album received favorable reviews from music critics, earning a score of 75 out of 100 on review aggregate site Album of the Year. The album spawned two singles: "Raindrops from the Sun (Hey, Hey, Hey)", which appeared in an episode of Grey's Anatomy (titled "Kung Fu Fighting"), and "Woke Up White", which Spin included on their list of "Songs You Need to Download Now!" in their October 2007 issue. In November 2007, Coppola said in interview that she was unsure if she was going to tour to support The Black & White Album, citing financial concerns. She said, "I don't even have a car. I don't know, I would love to put together at least one banging show together for this album. Definitely, it deserves that."

=== 2010–2016: The Glass Wall and collaborations ===
Coppola took a break from her solo work to focus on Little Jackie; in 2010, Coppola released a new EP via Reverbnation, titled Imani's Magic Chicken Soup EP. It included one single - "Over It", which had an accompanying music video.

In 2012, Coppola released her ninth solo studio album, The Glass Wall, via Bandcamp. The album is named for the New York City studio at which it was recorded.

That year, she also contributed "Celebrate", recorded with Tim Myers, to the soundtrack for Butter. Two years later, in 2014, Coppola recorded a song titled "Perfect Days", which was written by Tarka Cordell. The song was featured on a charity compilation honoring the songwriter; other contributors included Lily Allen, Alice Temple, and Alice Smith. The following year, in 2015, Coppola collaborated with Blackalicious on "The Sun", performing the song's chorus. Regarding the collaboration, Chief Xcel told Hip Hop DX that "she's just a genius, Imani Coppola. She's one of the most brilliant writers I've ever worked with [...] We'd done quite a few versions actually of that, and all were really, really dope. But when Imani heard it and she put her thing on it, I was like, 'That was it...'" In 2015, Coppola traveled to West Hollywood to work on her singing career.

In 2016, Coppola co-wrote and co-produced Hailey Knox's debut single, "Geeks", which was praised by Meghan Trainor; Coppola also wrote another of Knox's songs, "Awkward", with Michael Mangini, whom she had previously worked with on her debut album and in Little Jackie.

=== 2017–present: Hypocrites, The Protagonist and Air Fryer ===
On July 21, 2017, Coppola premiered a new single, "Just Feels Good", via Yahoo! Music. Coppola had originally written the song with Rachel Platten in mind, but after Platten passed on it, Coppola decided to record it herself. The music video was shot at Coney Island's annual Mermaid Parade. Hypocrites, Coppola's twelfth studio album, which was crowdfunded using PledgeMusic, was released on the same day as the release of "Just Feels Good". Coppola produced the album, along with co-producer Josh Valleau.

On September 25, 2017, Coppola released the album's second single, "Mixed Nut". Coppola stated that the song "poke(s) fun at some current social trends, such as speaking in a manner that makes it sound like you're always asking a question when you're actually making a statement. The term for it is 'up speak,' and I find it to be incredibly irritating even though I am sometimes guilty of doing it. Another pet peeve of the zeitgeist is this fixation people have with claiming not to be 'one to judge.' Please, if you are a human being, you judge." The accompanying music video filmed and edited by Vonesper Studios was shot in her apartment using her artwork as backdrops and premiered on Yahoo!Music. Coppola released her twelfth album, The Protagonist, in 2019 and her thirteenth album, Air Fryer, in 2024.

== Little Jackie ==
In 2007, Coppola was signed to S-Curve Records as part of the duo Little Jackie, in which she collaborated with producer and multi-instrumentalist Adam Pallin. Coppola sees Little Jackie as an opportunity to get back into pop and also to generate the income she needs to follow her dream of developing artists herself. She indicates that "genre-bending acts" like Gnarls Barkley enabled her to return to the music industry.

Speaking in July 2008 to noted UK R&B writer Pete Lewis of Blues & Soul, Coppola stated: "Whereas, in my opinion, Imani Coppola is a REAL artist, Little Jackie represents my 'POPULAR artist' side [...] And to me this is probably my last attempt at becoming a superstar! If it blows up — WONDERFUL! If I become a superstar — FANTASTIC!... And if I don't, I guess I'll stay very happy just being a crazy-lady artist — making art every day and having that be my food!"

The duo has released three albums. Their first, The Stoop, was released in July 2008 by S-Curve Records. The album's lead single, "The World Should Revolve Around Me", became a top 20 hit in the United Kingdom and was featured as the theme song for the VH1 reality TV series New York Goes to Hollywood, in which Little Jackie make a guest appearance. The album received generally favorable reviews from music critics, earning a score of 64 out of 100 on review aggregate site Album of the Year. The album peaked at number 138 on the UK Albums Chart. In 2011, Little Jackie released their second album MADE4TV independently on their own Plush Moon Records. Their third album, Queen of Prospect Park, was released on 30 September 2014. It featured two songs that appeared in I Don't Know How She Does It—"We Got It" and "Move to the Beat"—and "Lose It", which was featured in an episode of Grey's Anatomy. In 2022, Little Jackie released the EPs Nothing Worth Listening To Part 1: I Don't Need a Therapist I Have Keith and Nothing Worth Listening To Part 2: I Don't Need a Dating App, I Have Imani. A four-song Christmas EP titled It's Skipmas! was released in December 2024.

== Musical style ==
Coppola says her songwriting is fused through a "pop sensibility". She indicates that her tastes and musical influences are diverse, including classical, which she acknowledges can be a problem in an industry that wants its artists to be clearly defined. Coppola decided to write in whatever genre she wanted. She describes her focus on The Black and White Album as "more experimental, more punk, more rock".

Coppola uses a different process when she is songwriting for herself from when she is songwriting for another artist or writing on speculation. She says, "My brain changes, my thought processes, my body language changes, the way I work changes....; When you do work for other artists, it's definitely more of a job and it requires a lot of tools." Coppola commented, "When I saw the Spice Girls come out, I was like: I could do anything! I think that might be the most honest thing I've ever said in my life. They were the only people rapping and singing in a group that had all different varieties of things. I think I am a result of the Spice Girls."

== Other musical endeavors ==
Adept at co-writing songs, Coppola has been part of a number of song writing retreats including The Castle in the South of France where she wrote with Bon Jovi, and Fools Banquet, hosted by Hanson where she has written songs with the likes of Miles Zuniga, Taylor Hanson and Pedro Yanowitz.

When Coppola isn't working on her own albums, she's a songwriter for TV, film, and advertising, handcrafting songs for specific visual scenes and brands. Her music can be heard in commercials for Revlon, Gillette and Target. Coppola penned 'Move To The Beat" for the film I Don't Know How She Does It, and has had several songs on Grey's Anatomy over the years.

Coppola was chosen as a ghost writer for Cyndi Laupers' musical, Kinky Boots during its development stage. She has also performed as a violinist in the stage band for Lauper.

== Personal life ==
Coppola lives in Bedford-Stuyvesant with her cat. She records in her own home studio, but at one time shared a rehearsal space with Bob Dylan who commented that her practice was disturbing him.

She has commented that she struggles with the modern demands for accessibility in the music world, such as online interviews and video blogs. In making choices in her own life, she has stated that she is torn between respect and resentment at the legacy left by her parents, explaining, "My parents are both artists and we starved, we went through a lot of difficulty growing up because of their choices in life [...] When it comes down to making important decisions about my life and my foundation, you know, their artistic side haunts me. Like maybe I should just do what they did."

Coppola is also a talented painter and commented that her visual art brought in more income than her music in 2018.

Imani means 'faith', and Coppola deeply connects to spirituality including tarot reading and witchcraft.

== Discography ==
=== Solo ===
==== Albums ====
Title	Year	Record label	Peak chart positions	
Title	Year	Record label	US Heat	UK Albums
Chupacabra	1997	Columbia	47	128
Come and Get Me... What!?	2000	independent	—	—
Post-Traumatic Pop Syndrome	2002	independent	—	—
Little Red Fighting Mood	2002	independent	—	—
Afrodite	2004	independent	—	—
Small Thunder	2005	independent	—	—
The Vocal Stylings of Imani Coppola	2005	independent	—	—
The Black & White Album	2007	Ipecac	—	—
Free Spirit	2010	independent	—	—
The Glass Wall	2012	independent	—	—
Hypocrites	2017	independent	—	—
The Protagonist	2019	Ipecac	—	—
Air Fryer	2024	Plush Moon	—	—
"—" denotes an album that did not chart or was not released in that territory

=== Compilations ===
Title	Year	Record label	Peak chart positions	
Title	Year	Record label	US Heat	UK Albums
Demos From the Void	2022	Plush Moon	—	—
Unsung	2024	7A Records	—	—
"—" denotes an album that did not chart or was not released in that territory

==== Singles ====
List of singles, with selected chart positions, showing year released and album
Year	Album	Title	Peak chart positions						
Year	Album	Title	US	UK	AUS	BEL	GER	NLD	NZ
1997	Chupacabra	"Legend of a Cowgirl"	36	32	55	50	94	65	20
1997	Chupacabra	"I'm a Tree"	—	—	201	—	—	—	—
2000	Come and Get Me... What!?	"Count to 10"	—	—	—	—	—	—	—
2001	Who Let the Dogs Out?	"You All Dat" (Baha Men featuring Imani Coppola)	94	14	8	—	62	—	21
2002	Little Red Fighting Mood	"Woodstock"	—	—	—	—	—	—	—
2007	The Black & White Album	"Woke Up White"	—	—	—	—	—	—	—
2007	The Black & White Album	"Raindrops from the Sun (Hey Hey Hey)"	—	—	—	—	—	—	—
2010	Imani's Magic Chicken Soup EP	"Over It"	—	—	—	—	—	—	—
2010	Free Spirit	"Suckin' the Devil's Dick"	—	—	—	—	—	—	—
2012	The Glass Wall	"State of the Art"	—	—	—	—	—	—	—
2012	The Glass Wall	"Ave Maria"	—	—	—	—	—	—	—
2012	The Glass Wall	"The Kids are Dangerous"	—	—	—	—	—	—	—
2013	Unsung	"All Across the World"	—	—	—	—	—	—	—
2013	non-album single	"I'm the Shit" (acoustic)	—	—	—	—	—	—	—
2017	Hypocrites	"Just Feels Good"	—	—	—	—	—	—	—
2017	Hypocrites	"Mixed Nut"	—	—	—	—	—	—	—
2018	non-album single	"Shut Up" (NIGHTCALLER featuring Imani Coppola)	—	—	—	—	—	—	—
2019	The Protagonist	"Rattle"	—	—	—	—	—	—	—
2019	The Protagonist	"Samo"	—	—	—	—	—	—	—
2019	The Protagonist	"Contributing Member Of Society"	—	—	—	—	—	—	—
2019	The Protagonist	"Lying to My Therapist"	—	—	—	—	—	—	—
2019	The Protagonist	"Sage"	—	—	—	—	—	—	—
2020	non-album single	"In This Together"	—	—	—	—	—	—	—
2020	non-album single	"WTML (Don't Shoot!)" (with Ray Angry)	—	—	—	—	—	—	—
2024	non-album single	"Optimism"	—	—	—	—	—	—	—

=== Little Jackie ===
==== Albums ====
Studio albums
Year	Title	Peak chart positions
Year	Title	UK
2008	The Stoop: Released on July 8, 2008; S-Curve Records	138
2011	Made4TV: Released on October 15, 2011; Plush Moon Records	—
2014	Queen of Prospect Park: Released on September 30, 2014; Plush Moon Records	—

=== EPs ===
Studio albums
Year	Title	Peak chart positions
Year	Title	UK
2022	Nothing Worth Listening To Part 1: I Don't Need a Therapist I Have Keith: Released on August 22, 2022; Plush Moon	—
2022	Nothing Worth Listening To Part 2: I Don't Need a Dating App, I Have Imani: Released on September 6, 2022; Plush Moon	
2024	It's Skipmas!: Released on December 24, 2024; Plush Moon	—

==== Singles ====
Singles
Year	Single	Chart peak positions			Album
Year	Single	US Pop	UK	IRL	Album
2008	"The World Should Revolve Around Me"	90	14	30	The Stoop
2008	"The Stoop"	—	—	—	The Stoop
2009	"All I Really Want for Christmas"	—	—	—	It's Skipmas!
2011	"Move to the Beat"	—	—	—	Queen of Prospect Park
2012	"Take Back the World"	—	—	—	Made4TV
2012	"Kiss Kiss Bang Bang"	—	—	—	Made4TV
2012	"31 Flavors"	—	—	—	Made4TV
2012	"Cock Block"	—	—	—	Made4TV
2013	"Saturday"	—	—	—	Made4TV
2013	"Lose It"	—	—	—	Queen of Prospect Park
2013	"Mrs. Claus"	—	—	—	It's Skipmas!
2014	"Sweet"	—	—	—	Queen of Prospect Park
2022	"Vaginamite"	—	—	—	Nothing Worth Listening To Part 2: I Don't Need a Dating App, I Have Imani
