= Janko Nilović =

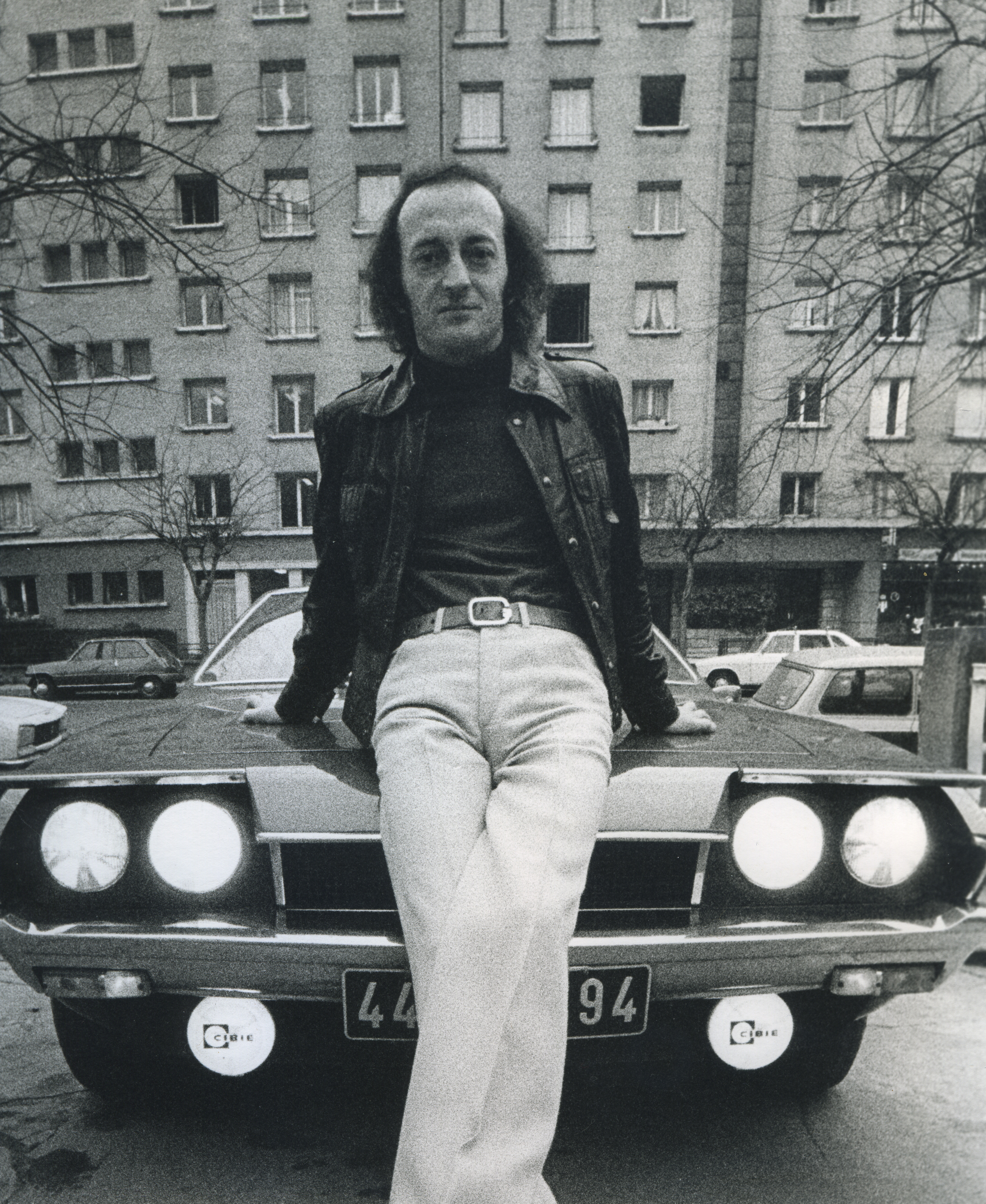

Background information
- Also known as: Alan Blackwell, Andy Loore, E. Orti, Tonton Roland Et Ses Pianos À Moustaches
- Born: 20 May 1941 (age 85); Istanbul, Turkey
- Genres: Library music, classical, jazz, psychedelic, funk, samba, bossa nova, pop, rock
- Occupation: Musician
- Instruments: Piano, double bass, guitar, oboe, percussion
- Years active: 1955–present

Janko Nilović (born 20 May 1941) is a Turkish-born French pianist, arranger and composer. He has published many works, most of them on library labels not available for sale to the public. His oeuvre stretches from classical, jazz, and funk to pop, psychedelia, and easy listening.

== Biography ==
Born in Istanbul, Turkey to a Montenegrin father and Greek mother, he studied piano, oboe and percussion as a child, and set up his own rock and roll band in the late 1950s. He moved to Paris, France in 1960, and played piano in nightclubs before joining a trio of Greek musicians, Les Doussis, with whom he played bass, guitar and keyboards. The group recorded for Barclay Records, and Nilović then began to find work as an arranger and orchestrator for pop musicians and TV shows, as well as continuing to perform in jazz clubs.

In 1967, he joined with French-based singer Davy Jones (unrelated to the Monkees' singer) to set up Ju Ju Records, writing and producing a series of singles by the singer. His arrangements brought him to the attention of André Farry, the founder of library music label Éditions Montparnasse 2000 (MP 2000), who signed him as a producer. Nilović started to release a series of LPs for the label, including Psyc Impressions, a commercially successful collaboration with Dave Sucky (real name Louis Delacour), described as "a heady stew of funky drums, gnarly fuzz guitar, and big band horn arrangements."

Nilović's song "Portrait d'un Robot" was used in a film short on the children's program Sesame Street that featured footage of wind-up toys, robots, satellites, and the Space Shuttle in flight.

At the same time as producing a succession of albums on MP 2000 under the collective title of Impressions, widely used in TV documentaries, he worked as organist in the Paris production of Hair, using cast members on some of his recordings. He also released records on other labels, using pseudonyms including Andy Loore and Johnny Montevideo, and in the mid-1970s started working in Belgium where he produced the album Funky Tramway, one of his most successful recordings. He arranged the songs of Michel Jonasz and Gérard Lenorman.

After leaving MP 2000 in the late 1970s, Nilović set up a music publishing company and focused on composing music. His reputation and influence grew, and his music began to be sampled by hip-hop and other musicians. The producer Dr. Dre sampled much of Nilović's piece "Underground Session" for his track "Loose Cannons" from the album Compton. Producer No I.D. sampled Nilović's song "In the Space", for Jay-Z's "D.O.A. (Death of Auto-Tune)", on the album The Blueprint 3; A year prior to this Danny!, who Jay Z would later endorse, sampled "Tapatapa" for "The Groove". In 2010 Nilovic was nominated for a Grammy award for the rap song "D.O.A.(Death of Auto-Tune)", along with Shawn Carter, Ernest Wilson, Gary DeCarlo, Dale Frashuer, Paul Leka, and Dave Sucky.

As of 2019, Nilović continues to work in Paris.

== Discography ==
- 1968 Maya Casabianca (Festival 66)
- 1968 Hommage a Monsieur Charlie Chaplin (Trema)
- 1968 Janko Nilović & Herve Roy (Telemusic)
- 1968 Janko Nilović, Raymond Guiot & Hervé Roy (Telemusic)
- 1969 Psyc Impressions (MP 2000)
- 1969 International Circus Band - Rande Parade de Cirque (Neuilly)
- 1969 Los Patos - Voodoo Ju Ju Obsession (Festival)
- 1971 Vocal Impressions (MP 2000)
- 1971 Janko Nilović & Pascal Auriat - Power (Briand)
- 1972 Pop Impressions (MP 2000)
- 1973 Supra Pop Impressions (MP 2000)
- 1973 Jazz Impressions 1 (MP 2000)
- 1973 Jazz Impressions 2 (MP 2000)
- 1974 Chorus (MP 2000)
- 1974 Rythmes Contemporains (MP 2000)
- 1974 Jouets Musicaux (MP 2000)
- 1974 Classical Phases (MP 2000)
- 1975 Soul Impressions (MP 2000)
- 1975 Percussions Dans L'espace (MSP 2000)
- 1975 Funky Tramway (Vogue)
- 1976 Un Couple Dans La Ville (MSP 2000)
- 1976 Super America (MSP 2000)
- 1976 Pop Shopin (MSP 2000)
- 1976 Star Cat Local Band directed by Janko Nilović (Cat Music)
- 1977 Concerto Pour Un Fou (MP 2000)
- 1977 L'ensemble de Trombones de Paris performs Suite Balkanique & Double Concerto by Janko Nilović (Crystal)
- 1978 Un Homme Dans L'Univers (MP 2000)
- 1979 Histoires Sans Paroles (MP 2000)
- 1979 Un Piano Dans L'Ouest (MP 2000)
- 1979 Balkans Impression (Selection)
- 1981 Concerto pour Trombone et Cordes Michel Becquet 'Trombone Extraordinaire' (Symphony Land SLC181) Also includes 'Suite Balkanique' and 'Double Concerto'
- 1986 Musique Pour Films Muets (Crea Sound)
- 1990 Néobaroque Luxuriant (FEF)
- 1990 Amoureux De Paris (1990)
- 1991 Extra Strong (FEF)
- 2016 Supra Hip Hop Impressions (Broc)
- 2020 Maze of sounds (as Janko Nilovic & The Soul Surfers) (Broc)
- 2024 Cosmos Giants (as Janko Nilovic, JJ Whitefield & Igor Zhukovsky) (Broc)
