= The World Should Revolve Around Me =

2008 single by Little Jackie

Single by Little Jackie

from the album The Stoop
- Released: August 25, 2008
- Length: 3:00
- Label: S-Curve
- Songwriters: Imani Coppola; Michael Mangini; Willie Mitchell; Adam Pallin; Early Randle
- Producer: Michael Mangini

Little Jackie singles chronology
"The World Should Revolve Around Me" (2008)	"The Stoop" (2008)

"The World Should Revolve Around Me" is the debut single of American pop-R&B duo Little Jackie. The song became a top-20 hit on the UK Singles Chart, and also peaked within the top 30 of the Irish Singles Chart. Upon its release, the song was met with a favorable reception from critics, who praised the song's Motown-esque production; however, some sociologists criticized the song, opining that it glamorized narcissism and demonstrated that the United States' narcissism is not declining. In the United States, the song appeared on the Billboard Pop 100, also appearing as the theme song for the VH1 reality TV series New York Goes to Hollywood.

== Background ==
Speaking in July 2008 to UK R&B writer Pete Lewis of Blues & Soul, Little Jackie frontwoman Imani Coppola explained how the song came about: "Being an artist isn't conducive to having a healthy relationship. And that song is definitely the pinnacle of my ego being bruised by my last partner leaving me! Basically the title represents a very childlike perspective that most people find identifiable... And, while I obviously don't REALLY think the world should revolve around me, I'm basically being defiant in saying 'I don't see the point of a partnership'. While, at the same time, I'm really creating a fantasy for EVERYONE to share and enjoy. You know, why not, at least for a few seconds, just sing along like it's your song? For three minutes of your life let the world revolve around YOU!"

== Release and reception ==
"The World Should Revolve Around Me" was released as a digital download on August 25, 2008, ahead of the release of the group's debut album, "The Stoop."

Thom Jurek of AllMusic commented that said the song has "Motown-rich string samples, punky, (and) ragged breaks...", also praising the song's lyrics. The Guardian's Jude Rogers felt that the song initially "sounds fun and playful," but that "under the surface lurks an indignant character."

=== Criticism ===
The song has been criticized by some sociologists and critics for depicting and glamorizing narcissism. In The Handbook of Narcissism and Narcissistic Personality Disorder, W. Keith Campbell and Joshua D. Miller theorize that the song would be at unpopular "in a less narcissistic culture, even if individual levels of narcissism showed only small differences." Jean M. Twenge and W. Keith Campbell, in their book The Narcissism Epidemic: Living in the Age of Entitlement, felt that the song has "no apparent sarcasm." In an article in The New York Times Guide to Essential Knowledge, writer Jon Pareles opined that the song was evidence that society's narcissism is not declining.

== Chart performance ==
On the UK Singles Chart, "The World Should Revolve Around Me" debuted at number 26. Two weeks later, it rose seven spots, to its number 14 peak, at which it spent one week. It spent a total of five weeks in the top 40 and seven weeks in the top 100. The song also peaked within the top 40 on the Ireland Singles Chart, where it debuted at number 43 and peaked at number 30, spending a total of 4 weeks in the top 100. The song also entered the Billboard Pop 100 airplay chart, reaching number 90 in October 2008.

== Music video ==
The music video is mostly straightforward performance, with some graffiti backgrounds. It also features Rosie Perez sitting on a stoop with the members of Little Jackie. The music video went into heavy rotation on VH1, reaching number 1 on the Billboard VH1 Video Monitor chart. The music video also entered the Top 10 on Billboard's Hot Videoclips chart, and was the most-played video on VH1 the week ending October 18, 2008.

== Charts ==
Chart (2008)	Peak position
Ireland (IRMA)	30
Scotland Singles (Official Charts)	10
UK Singles (Official Charts)	14
US Pop 100 (Billboard)	90

== Release history ==
Release dates and formats for "The World Should Revolve Around Me"
Region	Date	Format	Label(s)	Ref.
United States	October 21, 2008	Mainstream airplay	S-Curve	

== In popular culture ==
The song was featured in the trailer for the movie You Again, starring Kristen Bell, Jamie Lee Curtis, Sigourney Weaver, Odette Yustman and Betty White. The song was also featured on Episode 8 of Season 1 of 90210, with Little Jackie performing the song on the show. "The World Should Revolve Around Me" gained popularity in the U.S. after becoming the theme song for VH1's New York Goes to Hollywood. Little Jackie also appeared in an episode of the show. The music video was featured on VH1's "You Oughta Know" segment.
