= Adam Pallin =

American record producer

- Also known as: 1-900
- Origin: New York City, U.S.
- Genres: Pop; hip hop
- Occupations: Record producer; songwriter; multi-instrumentalist
- Website: www.astr.tv

Adam Pallin, also known by his stage name 1-900, is an American record producer, songwriter and multi-instrumentalist. He was the producer/programmer half of the pop duo Little Jackie with Imani Coppola. His production and songwriting often blend quirky, vintage aesthetic with cleverly crafted pop.

In 2013, he teamed up with Zoe Silverman to form ASTR, releasing debut EP Varsity on Neon Gold.

== Production credits ==
=== Albums ===
- The Stoop – Little Jackie (2008) – S-Curve (July 8, 2008) – Parlophone
- Varsity – ASTR (2014) – Neon Gold Records (January 7, 2014) – Neon Gold

=== Singles ===
- Little Jackie – "The World Should Revolve Around Me" (2008) – UK #14
- Little Jackie – "The Stoop" (2008)
- Chiddy Bang – "Ray Charles" (2011) – UK #13
- Ingrid Michaelson – "Afterlife" (2014)
- Joey Badass – "Teach Me (featuring Kiesza)" (2015)
- Joey Badass – "Devastated" (2016)
