= Joey Badass discography =

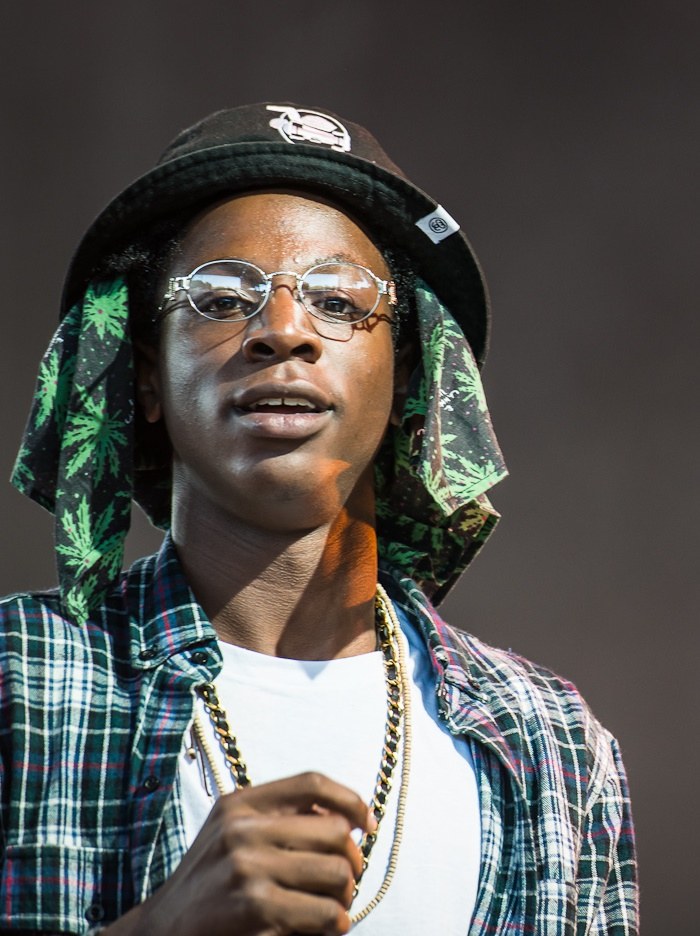
- Joey performing in Toronto in 2013
- Studio albums: 3
- EPs: 2
- Singles: 51
- Mixtapes: 4
- Guest appearances: 72

The discography of American rapper Joey Badass consists of three studio albums, two extended plays (EP), four mixtapes, and fifty-one singles (including fourteen as a featured artist).

Joey Badass released his debut mixtape, 1999, on June 12, 2012. The mixtape was followed up by Summer Knights, which was released in July 2013. Joey Badass went on to release his debut studio album B4.Da.$$ on January 20, 2015. He released his second studio album All-Amerikkkan Badass in April 2017. He released his third studio album 2000 on July 22, 2022.

== Studio albums ==
List of albums, with selected chart positions and sales figures
Title	Album details	Peak chart positions										Sales
Title	Album details	US	US R&B/HH	US Rap	AUS	CAN	NL	NOR	NZ	SWI	UK	Sales
B4.Da.$$	Released: January 20, 2015; Label: Pro Era, Cinematic, Relentless, RED; Formats: CD, LP, digital download	5	1	1	17	8	69	36	11	24	28	US: 227,000
All-Amerikkkan Badass	Released: April 7, 2017; Label: Pro Era, Cinematic; Formats: CD, LP, digital download	5	2	2	19	6	17	15	11	19	23	US: 81,721
2000	Released: July 22, 2022; Label: Pro Era, Cinematic, Columbia; Formats: Digital download, streaming	25	15	9	41	38	49	—	13	25	55	US: 22,000

== EPs ==
List of EPs, with selected chart positions
Title	Details	Peak chart positions
Title	Details	US R&B/HH
Summer Knights EP	Released: October 29, 2013; Label: Pro Era, Cinematic, Relentless, RED; Formats: Digital download	48
The Light Pack	Released: July 17, 2020; Label: Pro Era, Cinematic, Columbia; Formats: Digital download	—

== Mixtapes ==
List of mixtapes, with selected details
Title	Details
1999	Released: June 12, 2012; Label: Pro Era, Cinematic, Relentless, RED; Formats: LP, Digital download
Rejex	Released: September 6, 2012; Label: Pro Era, Cinematic, Relentless, RED; Formats: Digital download
Summer Knights	Released: July 1, 2013; Label: Pro Era, Cinematic, Relentless, RED; Formats: Digital download
Lonely at the Top	Released: August 29, 2025; Label: Pro Era, Columbia; Formats: CD, digital download, streaming

== Singles ==
=== As lead artist ===
List of singles as lead artist, showing year released, certifications, peak chart positions and album name
Title	Year	Peak chart positions						Certifications	Album
Title	Year	US Bub.	US R&B/HH	AUS	CAN	NZ Hot	UK R&B	Certifications	Album
"Waves"	2012	—	—	—	—	—	—		1999
"Enter the Void" (featuring Ab-Soul)	2012	—	—	—	—	—	—		Non-album single
"Unorthodox" (featuring DJ Premier)	2013	—	—	—	—	—	—		Summer Knights
"My Yout" (featuring Collie Buddz)	2013	—	—	—	—	—	—		Summer Knights
"Big Dusty"	2014	—	—	—	—	—	—		B4.Da.$$
"Christ Conscious"	2014	—	—	—	—	—	—	RMNZ: Gold	B4.Da.$$
"No. 99"	2014	—	—	—	—	—	—		B4.Da.$$
"Curry Chicken"	2014	—	—	—	—	—	—		B4.Da.$$
"On & On" (featuring Maverick Sabre and Dyemond Lewis)	2014	—	—	—	—	—	—		B4.Da.$$
"Teach Me" (featuring Kiesza)	2015	—	—	—	—	—	23		B4.Da.$$
"Lose Control" (with Glass Animals)	2015	—	—	—	—	—	—		Non-album singles
"Ready"	2016	—	—	—	—	—	—		Non-album singles
"Brooklyn's Own"	2016	—	—	—	—	—	—		Non-album singles
"Devastated"	2016	25	47	—	—	—	—	RIAA: 2× Platinum; MC: Platinum; RMNZ: Platinum	All-Amerikkkan Badass
"Land of the Free"	2017	—	—	—	—	—	—		All-Amerikkkan Badass
"Rockabye Baby" (featuring ScHoolboy Q)	2017	10	50	97	87	—	—		All-Amerikkkan Badass
"Temptation"	2017	—	—	—	—	— (Note: "Temptation" did not enter the NZ Top 40 or Hot Singles Charts, but peaked at number five on the NZ Heatseeker Singles Chart.)	—	RIAA: Gold; BPI: Silver; RMNZ: Platinum	All-Amerikkkan Badass
"Love Is Only a Feeling"	2017	—	—	—	—	—	—	RIAA: 2× Platinum; BPI: Gold; RMNZ: 2× Platinum	Non-album singles
"500 Benz"	2017	—	—	—	—	—	—		Non-album singles
"The Revenge"	2022	—	—	—	—	—	—		Non-album singles
"Head High"	2022	—	—	—	—	—	—		2000
"Where I Belong"	2022	—	—	—	—	—	—		2000
"Survivors Guilt"	2022	—	—	—	—	—	—		2000
"Zipcodes"	2022	—	—	—	—	29	—		2000
"Fallin'"	2023	—	—	—	—	33	—		Non-album single
"Fallout" (with Lyrical Lemonade, Gus Dapperton and Lil Yachty)	2024	—	—	—	—	—	—		All Is Yellow
"Tell Me" (with Chlöe)	2024	—	—	—	—	26	—		Non-album singles
"Wadibusa" (with Uncle Waffles and Royal Musiq featuring Pcee and OHP Sage)	2024	—	—	—	—	—	—		Non-album singles
"The Ruler's Back"	2025	—	—	—	—	—	—		Non-album singles
"Sorry Not Sorry"	2025	—	—	—	—	—	—		Non-album singles
"Pardon Me"	2025	—	—	—	—	—	—		Non-album singles
"The Finals"	2025	—	—	—	—	—	—		Non-album singles
"My Town" (featuring Loaded Lux)	2025	—	—	—	—	—	—		Non-album singles
"Crash Dummy"	2025	—	—	—	—	—	—		Non-album singles
"ABK"	2025	—	—	—	—	—	—		Non-album singles
"Dark Aura"	2025	—	—	—	—	—	—		Lonely at the Top
"Still" (featuring Ab-Soul and Rapsody)	2025	—	—	—	—	—	—		Lonely at the Top
"Supaflee" (featuring Bri Steves)	2025	—	—	—	—	31	—		Lonely at the Top
"Highroller" (featuring ASAP Ferg and Kelz2busy)	2025	—	—	—	—	37	—		Lonely at the Top
"—" denotes a recording that did not chart or was not released in that territory.

=== As featured artist ===
List of singles as featured artist, showing year released, peak chart positions and album name
Title	Year	Peak chart positions		Certifications	Album
Title	Year	AUS	UK	Certifications	Album
"Bird's Eye View" (Statik Selektah featuring Raekwon, Joey Badass and Black Thought)	2013	—	—		Extended Play
"Bad Thing" (Kiesza featuring Joey Badass)	2014	—	—		Sound of a Woman
"Purple Tuesday" (Rejjie Snow featuring Joey Badass and Jesse Boykins III)	2017	—	—		The Moon & You
"Either Way" (Snakehips and Anne-Marie featuring Joey Badass)	2017	64	47	BPI: Silver; RMNZ: Gold	Non-album singles
"Still New York" (MAX and Leslie Grace featuring Joey Badass)	2018	—	—		Non-album singles
"Lil Arrogant" (Jay IDK featuring Joey Badass and Russ)	2018	—	—		Non-album singles
"Left Hand" (Beast Coast featuring Joey Badass, Flatbush Zombies, The Underachievers, Kirk Knight, Nyck Caution and CJ Fly)	2019	—	—		Escape from New York
"Outside" (Westside Boogie featuring Joey Badass)	2020	—	—		Non-album singles
"Amigo" (Remix) (Lous and the Yakuza featuring Joey Badass)	2021	—	—		Non-album singles
"'Cosmic'.m4a" (The Alchemist Version) (Denzel Curry and Kenny Beats featuring Joey Badass)	2021	—	—		Unlocked 1.5
"Because" (Danger Mouse and Black Thought featuring Joey Badass, Russ and Dylan Cartlidge)	2022	—	—		Cheat Codes
"The Highs & the Lows" (Chance the Rapper featuring Joey Badass)	2022	—	—		Star Line
"Polish Jazz" (Chuck Strangers featuring Joey Badass)	2024	—	—		A Forsaken Lover's Plea
"Fry Plantain" (Lila Iké featuring Joey Badass)	2024	—	—		Non-album single
"—" denotes a recording that did not chart or was not released in that territory.

== Other charted and certified songs ==
List of songs, with selected chart positions, showing year released and album name
Title	Year	Peak chart positions					Certifications	Album
Title	Year	US	US R&B/HH	US Rap	NZ Heat.	NZ Hot	Certifications	Album
"Survival Tactics"	2012	—	—	—	—	—	RMNZ: Gold	1999
"1 Train" (ASAP Rocky featuring Kendrick Lamar, Joey Badass, Yelawolf, Danny Brown, Action Bronson and Big K.R.I.T.)	2013	— (Note: "1 Train" did not enter the Billboard Hot 100, but peaked at number three on the Bubbling Under Hot 100 Singles chart.)	31	25	—	—	RIAA: Gold; RMNZ: Gold	Long. Live. ASAP
"Paper Trails"	2015	—	—	—	—	—	RMNZ: Gold	B4.Da.$$
"For My People"	2017	—	—	—	7	—		All-Amerikkkan Badass
"Infinity (888)" (XXXTentacion featuring Joey Badass)	2018	83	36	—	3	—	RIAA: Platinum; BPI: Silver; RMNZ: Platinum	?
"The Baddest" (featuring Diddy)	2022	—	—	—	—	22		2000
"Make Me Feel"	2022	—	—	—	—	20		2000
"Brand New 911" (featuring Westside Gunn)	2022	—	—	—	—	21		2000
"Cruise Control"	2022	—	—	—	—	17		2000
"Show Me"	2022	—	—	—	—	—	RMNZ: Gold	2000
"—" denotes a recording that did not chart or was not released in that territory.

== Other guest appearances ==
List of other non-single guest appearances, with other performing artists, showing year released and album name
Title	Year	Other artists	Album
"Talking Shit"	2012	Capital STEEZ	AmeriKKKan Korruption
"America"	2012	Mac Miller, Casey Veggies	Macadelic
"Aromatherapy"	2012	Uno Hype, CJ Fly	Fxck the Hype
"New World Order"	2012	Bryant Dope, Perrion	No Album
"Gotham Fuckin' City"	2012	Smoke DZA	K.O.N.Y.
"Swank Sinatra"	2012	Dyme-A-Duzin, Capital STEEZ, CJ Fly	A Portrait of Donnovan
"Live from East Flatbush"	2012	MeLo-X, CJ Fly	Steve-Ography's Inside The Mind of MeLo 3
"Black & White"	2013	Jared Evan & Statik Selektah	Boom Bap & Blues
"Maintain"	2013	Dizzy Wright	The Golden Age
"Day in the Life"	2013	Harry Fraud, Peter Rosenberg	New York Renaissance
"Hot Box"	2013	Funkmaster Flex, Nyck Caution	Who You Mad At? Me Or Yourself
"Beyond a Reasonable Doubt"	2013	Action Bronson	XXL Freshman 2013 Mixtape
"Sup Preme"	2013	CJ Fly	Thee Way Eye See It
"Blackkk Crown"	2013	Capital STEEZ, Dirty Sanchez, CJ Fly, Rokamouth, Dessy Hinds	Long Live Steelo
"The Spark"	2013	Statik Selektah, Action Bronson, Mike Posner	Extended Play
"Messin' with You"	2013	Justine Skye, AZ	Everyday Living
"Tis the Season"	2013	Audio Push, Hit-Boy	Come As You Are
"Fhvt BVsturd"	2014	Smoke DZA	Dream. Zone. Achieve
"Flute"	2014	Buckshot & P-Money, CJ Fly	Backpack Travels
"Knicks (Remix)"	2014	MadGibbs, Ransom, Action Bronson	Knicks (Remix)
"Slum Villain"	2014	Statik Selektah	What Goes Around...
"Jerome"	2014	Mick Jenkins	The Waters
"Tree of Life"	2014	Ab-Soul	These Days..
"Golden Era"	2015	PRhyme	PRhyme (Deluxe Version)
"We Don't Wanna Be"	2015	Maverick Sabre	Innerstanding
"Did U Ever Think"	2015	Flatbush Zombies, Issa Gold	—N/a
"World in Your Pocket"	2015	Nyck Caution	—N/a
"Connected"	2015	Ea$y Money, Push!, Wais P	The Motive of Nearly Everybody, Yo
"In the Wind"	2015	Statik Selektah, Big K.R.I.T., Chauncy Sherod	Lucky 7
"Alone"	2015	Statik Selektah	Lucky 7
"What's the Score"	2015	Ady Suleiman	—N/a
"What About the Rest of Us"	2015	Action Bronson, Rico Love	Southpaw (Music from and Inspired by the Motion Picture)
"Don't Need It (Remix)"	2015	Rapsody, Merna	—N/a
"Lose Control"	2015	Glass Animals	—N/a
"Twin Skeleton's (Hotel in NYC)"	2015	Fall Out Boy	Make America Psycho Again
"5 Minutes"	2015	Kirk Knight	Late Knight Special
"Lord Knows"	2016	G Herbo	—N/a
"Just Rhymin'"	2016	Your Old Droog, Styles P	—N/a
"Crucifix"	2016	Nyck Caution, Albey Balgochian	Disguise the Limit
"What's Understood"	2016	Nyck Caution	Disguise the Limit
"1998"	2016	Maxo Kream	Maxo 187
"Zenith"	2016	Denzel Curry	Imperial
"Top Shotta"	2016	Termanology	More Politics
"Riviera"	2017	ASAP Twelvyy, Telana	12
"What Happens"	2017	ASAP Rocky, ASAP Ferg, ASAP Twelvyy, Playboi Carti, Kirk Knight	Cozy Tapes Vol. 2: Too Cozy
"Ain't a Damn Thing Change"	2017	Statik Selektah, G-Eazy, Enisa	8
"Vacation"	2018	Flatbush Zombies	Vacation in Hell
"The Mood"	2018	Smoke DZA	Not for Sale
"Happy Without Me"	2018	Chloe x Halle	The Kids Are Alright
"A Pause for Peace"	2018	Chuck Strangers	Consumers Park
"Style Wars"	2018	Chuck Strangers	Consumers Park
"Hot Box"	2018	JID, Method Man	DiCaprio 2
"Too Many Gods"	2019	ASAP Rocky	For the Throne: Music Inspired by the HBO Series Game of Thrones
"Daemons"	2019	XXXTentacion	Bad Vibes Forever
"Rudebwoy"	2019	CJ Fly	Rudebwoy
"327"	2020	Westside Gunn, Tyler, The Creator, Billie Escco	Pray for Paris
"Watch Me"	2020	Statik Selektah	The Balancing Act
"Endless Summer (Remix)"	2020	Jaden Smith, Raury	CTV3: Day Tripper's Edition
"Note to Self"	2021	Russ, Big Sean, Wale	Chomp 2
"How You Live It"	2022	Nyck Caution	Anywhere but Here
"Letting Off Steam"	2022	DJ Premier	Hip Hop 50: Vol. 1
"How U Feel"	2022	Snot	Ethereal
"Mask On"	2022	Sampa the Great	As Above, So Below
"Barragan Lighting"	2023	Larry June, The Alchemist, Currensy	The Great Escape
"Life + Times"	2023	Statik Selektah	Round Trip
"Hatchback"	2023	Mike Dimes	Texas Boy
"Shimmy"	2023	Logic	College Park
"Vertino"	2024	Conway the Machine	Slant Face Killah
"Shook Up"	2024	Erick the Architect, FARR	I've Never Been Here Before
"Blessings"	2024	Neek Buck	UNIQUE
"Denim"	2024	IDK	Bravado + Intimo
"Stank Rose"	2024	BLK ODYSSEY	1-800 FANTASY
"Syrup Sandwiches"	2024	Cordae	The Crossroads
"EUPHORIA"	2025	Bktherula, Murda Beatz, KayCyy	LUCY
"The Louvre"	2025	Statik Selektah, Westside Gunn, Rome Streetz	The Louvre
"Grant's Tom '97 (Jazzmobile)"	2025	Big L, BVNGS, DJ Ron G	Harlem's Finest: Return of the King
"NU-GEE-LA"	2025	Ab-Soul, Rapsody	FEAR AND LOATHING IN DEL AMO
