= Lonely at the Top (Joey Badass album) =

Mixtape by Joey Badass
- Released: August 29, 2025
- Genre: East Coast hip-hop
- Length: 39:34
- Labels: Columbia; Pro Era
- Producers: AyeYB; Boi-1da; Boysarerolling; Chrishan; Chuck Strangers; COLEMAN; Daniel; Farsight; Hitmaka; Jacobi; Jay Versace; Kirk Knight; Max Théodore; Moo Latte; OSA; Statik Selektah; Rato

Joey Badass chronology
| 2000 (2022) | Lonely at the Top (2025) |

Singles from Lonely at the Top
- 1. "Dark Aura" Released: August 18, 2025; 2. "Still" Released: August 25, 2025

Lonely at the Top is the third mixtape by the American rapper Joey Bada$$. It was released through Columbia Records and Pro Era Records on August 29, 2025.

== Background and promotion ==
In May 2025, Joey Bada$$ began a feud with West Coast hip-hop rapper Ray Vaughn, releasing diss tracks against each other, first Vaughn with "Hoe Era", mocking Badass' group Pro Era and fellow member CJ Fly, followed by his "The Finals", in which he throws shots at Vaughn's label Top Dawg Entertainment (TDE) and its founder Anthony "Top Dawg" Tiffith, as well as calling out former label-mate Kendrick Lamar. The following days saw the feud escalate, with many other rappers releasing diss tracks, including Daylyt, CJ Fly, Reason, AzChike, and Hitta J3, among others.

In July 2025, Bada$$ announced his fourth studio album, Lonely at the Top, with a scheduled release date of August 1, and released the single, "ABK", to promote it. He performed the song on the Jimmy Kimmel Live! late-night show two days before its official release, on July 16. Joey Badass released the lead single "Dark Aura" on August 18, and announced a new album release date of August 29. He also announced The Dark Aura Tour in support of the album, with support from Rapsody and Ab-Soul, however in October 2025 announced the cancellation of the tour. He released the album's second single, "Still", featuring Rapsody and Ab-Soul on August 25, 2025. The album released on August 29, featuring guest appearances from Ty Dolla Sign, Rome Streetz, CJ Fly, Westside Gunn, Bri Steves, Kelz2busy, Kai Ca$h, ASAP Ferg, Rapsody, and Ab-Soul. A music video for "Supaflee" was released on September 30, 2025.

== Track listing ==
| No. | Title | Writer(s) | Producer(s) | Length |
|---|---|---|---|---|
| 1. | "Dark Aura" | Jo-Vaughn Virginie; Che Jessamy; Brian "Moo Latte" Massaka | Chuck Strangers; Moo Latte | 2:53 |
| 2. | "Swank White" (featuring Westside Gunn) | Virginie; Alvin Worthy; Stephan Ruggiero; Brenda Payton; Jerry Jones | Rato | 4:18 |
| 3. | "Supaflee" (featuring Bri Steves) | Virginie; Kirlan Labarrie | Kirk Knight | 3:12 |
| 4. | "Highroller" (featuring ASAP Ferg and Kelz2busy) | Virginie; Darold Brown; Arkele "Kelz2busy" Brown; Matthew Samuels; Scotty "COLEMAN" Coleman; Jacobi Aiken; E. McCaine; C. Slater | Boi-1da; COLEMAN; Jacobi | 3:27 |
| 5. | "Ready to Love" (featuring Ty Dolla Sign) | Virginie; Tyrone Griffin; Christopher Dotson; Malachi "AyeYB" Haden; Christian Ward; Ozerov "OSA" Aleksandrovich | Chrishan; AyeYB; Hitmaka; OSA | 3:00 |
| 6. | "BK's Finest" (featuring Rome Streetz, Kai Ca$h, and CJ Fly) | Virginie; Jerome Allen; Patrick Baril; Massaka | Statik Selektah; Moo Latte | 4:34 |
| 7. | "Underwater" | Virginie; Arno Sugarman (of Boysarerolling); Miles Sugarman (of Boysarerolling); Crosby Spagnoli (of Boysarerolling); Aaron Kelley; Cyrus "Farsight" Spurlock; Daniel Perez Badilla | Boysarerolling; Farsight; Daniel | 4:12 |
| 8. | "3 Feet Away" | Virginie; A. Sugarman; M. Sugarman; Spagnoli; Kelley | Boysarerolling | 3:58 |
| 9. | "Speedin' Through the Rain" | Virginie; Jahlil Gunter; Max Théodore | Jay Versace; Max Théodore | 3:14 |
| 10. | "Still" (featuring Ab-Soul and Rapsody) | Virginie; Herbert Stevens; Baril | Statik Selektah | 3:26 |
| 11. | "Lonely at the Top" | Virginie; Kelley; A. Sugarman; M. Sugarman; Spagnoli | Boysarerolling; Aaron Kelley (add.) | 3:17 |
| Total length: | | | | 39:24 |

Notes

- All track titles are stylized in all caps

== Charts ==
Chart performance for Lonely at the Top
| Chart (2025) | Peak position |
|---|---|
| Portuguese Albums (AFP) | 158 |
