= Ray Vaughn =

American rapper (born 1996)

- Born: Rayvon DeRay Welch; September 15, 1996 (age 30)
- Origin: Long Beach, California, US
- Genre: West Coast hip hop
- Occupations: Rapper; songwriter
- Instrument: Vocals
- Labels: TDE; RCA

Rayvon DeRay Welch (born September 15, 1996), better known as Ray Vaughn, is an American rapper and songwriter from Long Beach, California. After several independent releases, he signed to Top Dawg Entertainment in a move publicly announced in August 2021.

== Biography ==
Born September 15, 1996, Vaughn is from Long Beach, California. He began rapping when he was twelve years old. He grew up listening to Drake, Fabolous, Lil Wayne and Snoop Dogg.

Around 2019, Vaughn was introduced to Kanye West and went on to write songs for him, although the collaborations didn't come to fruition. In 2020, Vaughn signed with Top Dawg Entertainment (TDE), which was announced in 2021. Soon after, he released his extended play Peer Pressure. He also did a freestyle for KPWR, rapping over the instrumentals of "Lay Low" by Snoop Dogg and "Feel It in the Air" by Beanie Sigel.

On June 19, 2024, Vaughn performed his song "Problems", for Kendrick Lamar's concert The Pop Out: Ken & Friends at the Kia Forum in Inglewood, California, during the first set by DJ Hed, titled the Act I – DJ Hed & Friends.

On April 25, 2025, Vaughn released The Good, The Bad, The Dollar Menu under TDE. The mixtape features guest appearances from labelmates Jay Rock and Isaiah Rashad, among others.

In May 2025, he and East Coast hip hop rapper Joey Badass began a feud, releasing diss tracks against each other, first Vaughn with "Hoe Era", mocking Badass' group Pro Era and fellow member CJ Fly, followed by Badass with "The Finals", in which he throws shots at Vaughn's label TDE and its founder Anthony "Top Dawg" Tiffith, as well as calling out former label-mate Kendrick Lamar. The following days saw the feud escalate, with many other rappers releasing diss tracks, including Daylyt, CJ Fly, Reason, AzChike, and Hitta J3, among others.

In June 2025, Vaughn was selected for the 2025 XXL freshman class. Later in the same month, he signed with RCA Records.

== Discography ==
Mixtapes

- Idle (2019)
- The Good, The Bad, The Dollar Menu (2025)

Extended plays

- Blame Summer (2018)
- Projects (2019)
- Peer Pressure (2021)

Singles

- "Look Don't Touch" (2026)
- "Vibe Responsibly" (featuring Isaiah Rashad) (2026)
- "Hit and Run" (featuring AzChike) (2026)
- "Look @ God" (with LaRussell) (2025)
- "Golden Eye" (2025)
- "Hoe Era" (2025)
- "Dollar Menu" (2025)
- "Flat Shasta" (with Ash Leone) (2025)
- "Cemetery Lanterns" (2025)
- "Impossible Patty" (2025)
- "Crashout Heritage" (2025)
- "East Chatt" (with Isaiah Rashad) (2024)
- "FNBM" (with NLE Choppa) (2024)
- "Everybody Dies" (with Sir) (2024)
- "87 Cutlass" (with The Game) (2024)
- "Ray Wop" (2024)
- "Blasphemy" (produced by Boi-1da) (2024)
- "So Into You (Freestyle)" (2024)
- "Problems" (with Pusha T) (2024)
- "5:30 (Freestyle)" (2024)
- "Ted Talk" (2023)
- "Sandcastles" (with Ab-Soul) (2023)
- "Plot Twist" (with London Monét) (2023)
- "Kim Possible" (2022)
- "Tradeline" (2022)
- "Dawg House" (2022)
- "The Freak Brothers Theme Song" (2021)
- "Explain" (2020)
- "Worst Decision Ever" (2019)
- "Hit Different" (2019)
- "Under Pressure" (2019)
- "Nerves" (2019)
- "W.I.N." (2018)
- "Attention" (2018)
- "Clutch" (2018)
- "Lovers Turn Enemies" (with Katina Merie) (2018)
- "Commit" (2018)
- "Afraid to Fall in Love" (2018)
- "Worry Nun "Back 2 You"" (2018)
- "Plot" (2017)
- "Stay Away" (2016)
- "Fashionable" (2014)
