= Escape from New York (Beast Coast album) =

Studio album by Beast Coast
- Released: May 24, 2019
- Genre: Hip hop
- Length: 46:36
- Label: Beast Coast Media; Columbia
- Producer: Erick Arc Elliott; Powers Pleasant; Sam Wish; Tyler Dopps

Escape from New York is the debut studio album by New York hip hop supergroup Beast Coast, released through Beast Coast Media and Columbia Records on May 24, 2019. The group consists of members from Pro Era (including Joey Badass, Kirk Knight, Nyck Caution, CJ Fly, and Powers Pleasant), Flatbush Zombies and The Underachievers. It features the singles "Left Hand" and "Snow in the Stadium". The group embarked on the Escape from New York Tour to promote the album, which started in Seattle on July 23, 2019. The album is titled after the 1981 American science fiction action film Escape from New York.

== Critical reception ==
Professional ratings
Review scores
Source	Rating
Pitchfork	6.5/10

Sheldon Pearce of Pitchfork said "Escape From New York turns its title into a metaphor. Beast Coast attempt to move beyond the boundaries established by the hallowed ground of their home, finding a deeper inspiration in brotherhood." He also wrote "Songs like “Snow in the Stadium” and “Desperado” show that this group is, in fact, capable of producing not just functional but enjoyable rap songs."

== Track listing ==
No.	Title	Length
1.	"It Ain't Easy, It Ain't Easy" (featuring Flatbush Zombies, Nyck Caution, Kirk Knight, CJ Fly and AK)	3:40
2.	"Left Hand" (featuring Joey Badass, Flatbush Zombies, The Underachievers, Kirk Knight, Nyck Caution and CJ Fly)	3:43
3.	"Problemz" (featuring Erick the Architect, CJ Fly, The Underachievers, Zombie Juice and Nyck Caution)	3:46
4.	"Far Away" (featuring Kirk Knight, Meechy Darko, Erick the Architect, Nyck Caution and Joey Badass)	3:08
5.	"Snow in the Stadium" (featuring Erick the Architect, Joey Badass, Meechy Darko, Kirk Knight, CJ Fly and Issa Gold)	4:38
6.	"Rubberband" (featuring Joey Badass and Flatbush Zombies)	3:49
7.	"Distance" (Joey Badass, Issa Gold and Erick the Architect)	2:13
8.	"Bones" (featuring Flatbush Zombies, The Underachievers, Nyck Caution and Kirk Knight)	3:28
9.	"Puke" (featuring Nyck Caution, Erick the Architect, Meechy Darko, AK and Joey Badass)	2:55
10.	"Desperado" (featuring Meechy Darko, Joey Badass, Zombie Juice and Kirk Knight)	3:44
11.	"One More Round" (featuring Meechy Darko, Erick the Architect, Nyck Caution and Joey Badass)	3:50
12.	"Coast/Clear" (featuring Joey Badass, Flatbush Zombies, Kirk Knight, Nyck Caution and Issa Gold)	3:47
13.	"Last Choir" (featuring Meechy Darko, Kirk Knight, Erick the Architect, Nyck Caution and AK)	3:55
Total length:		46:36

== Charts ==
Chart (2019)	Peak position
Australian Albums (ARIA)	95
Dutch Albums (Album Top 100)	81
New Zealand Albums (RMNZ)	32
Swiss Albums (Schweizer Hitparade)	58
US Billboard 200	29
