= B4.Da.$$ =

2015 album by Joey Badass

B4.DA.$$

Studio album by Joey Bada$$
- Released: January 20, 2015
- Recorded: 2012–2014
- Genre: East Coast hip hop; conscious hip hop
- Length: 53:26
- Label: Pro Era; Cinematic; Relentless; RED
- Producer: Joey Badass (exec.); Jonny Shipes (exec.); ASTR; Basquiat; Chuck Strangers; DJ Premier; Freddie Joachim; Hit-Boy; J Dilla; Kirk Knight; Lee Bannon; The Roots; Samiyam; Statik Selektah

Joey Bada$$ chronology
Summer Knights (2013)	B4.DA.$$ (2015)	All-Amerikkkan Badass (2017)

Singles from B4.Da.$$
- 1. "Big Dusty" Released: August 8, 2014; 2. "Christ Conscious" Released: September 30, 2014; 3. "No. 99" Released: December 9, 2014; 4. "Curry Chicken" Released: December 23, 2014; 5. "On & On" Released: December 30, 2014; 6. "Teach Me" Released: January 7, 2015; 7. "Like Me" Released: February 11, 2015; 8. "Paper Trails" Released: June 16, 2015

B4.Da.$$ (pronounced "Before Da Money") is the debut studio album by American rapper Joey Badass. It was released on January 20, 2015, his 20th birthday, by Cinematic Music Group and Relentless Records. The album was released in North America and United Kingdom, as well as being made available for digital download on iTunes.

The album debuted at number five on the Billboard 200, selling 54,000 copies in the first week in the United States.

== Background ==
Joey Badass first began receiving a widespread recognition, following the release of his debut mixtape 1999 on June 12, 2012. It was named the 38th best album of 2012, by Complex and the best mixtape of 2012, by HipHopDX, as well as being nominated for "Mixtape of the Year", by BET. In April 2013, B4.Da.$$ was announced as the title to his album, via his Twitter account.

It's coming really soon. I don't want to set a date and be like "yeah it's coming here" then disappoint my fans and not have it ready.

— Joey Badass, in an interview with Oyster Colored Velvet on 7 July 2014.

Joey Badass' recognition continued growing even further with the release of his critically acclaimed single "Unorthodox", produced by DJ Premier, before the release of his second mixtape Summer Knights on July 1, 2013, which was placed 19th on XXL's list of the best mixtapes of 2013.

== Recording and production ==
Producers who contributed on this album includes these fellow Pro Era members, Kirk Knight and Chuck Strangers, as well as Statik Selektah, DJ Premier, Hit-Boy, J Dilla, The Roots, Samiyam, Basquiat, Freddie Joachim, and Lee Bannon.

== Promotion ==
The album's release was preceded by the #B4DAMONEYTOUR, where Joey Badass performed several of his singles prior to the album's official release date. The tour featured by American hip-hop recording artist Vince Staples, hip-hop collective Run The Jewels, Chance & Status, Raz Fresco and his own collective Pro Era performing some of their unreleased songs. During the tour, Pro Era released 4 videos (episodes) promoting the tour and the album.

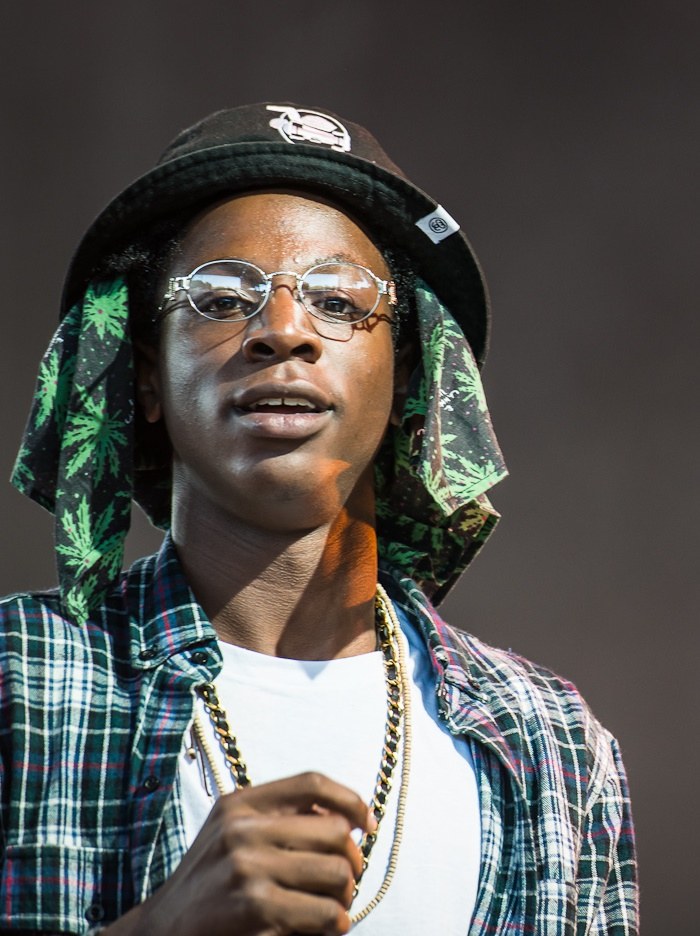
Joey Badass first announced B4.Da.$$ in April 2013, and went on tour in Europe, Australia and New Zealand in late 2014 to promote the album prior to its release.

The tour began running across through North America, Europe, Australia and New Zealand; though its European leg was cut short due to the death of Joey Badass' cousin Junior B, to whom he dedicated the album, the music video for "No. 99" and the release of his fifth single "On & On". While in Australia, Joey Badass was arrested and charged with assault for allegedly punching a security guard in the face at the Falls Festival in Byron Bay, New South Wales, which resulted in major controversy surrounding him and Pro Era. According to reports, the guard didn't recognize Joey Badass and stopped him before he took to the stage, mistakenly thinking that he was not authorized to be there. He would spend all night in jail, before he was granted bail and pleaded not guilty to the charge during the court hearing on the following day. Prior to the album's release, Pro Era received a major buzz due to a photo of American president Barack Obama's daughter Malia seen wearing a Pro Era shirt. The album would then receive a major coverage, resulting in its pre-sales increasing massively. The album was also featured on Billboard, XXL and Complex's lists of most anticipated albums of 2015. Prior to the album's release, Joey Badass performed "Like Me" with BJ the Chicago Kid, The Roots and Statik Selektah on The Tonight Show Starring Jimmy Fallon on January 13, 2015.

The night before release, Joey Badass held an early-release concert in Brooklyn's Rough Trade record shop. To gain access, fans had to purchase the album; Joey Badass also did a post-concert meet and greet, where he met the first 50 fans who purchased the album. To celebrate the release of B4.Da.$$ on his 20th birthday, he held a release party in New York City. On February 2, 2015, the album was physically released in the United Kingdom, with Joey Badass performing in an event in East London similar to the launch event at the Rough Trade shop in East London. His fans once again gained access by purchasing the album, while Joey then did a meet-and-greet with his fans after his performance. On February 5, he appeared on Le Before du Grand Journal in France, where he performed "Paper Trails" with Powers Pleasant and then was interviewed by the show's host Thomas Thouroude.

The art direction and music packaging for B4.Da.$$ were done by Pro Era members Tony Whlgn and Dee Knows, featuring Joey Badass on a New York City rooftop.

=== Singles ===
Joey's official debut single, titled "Big Dusty", was released on August 8, 2014. It was produced by Kirk Knight. On September 30, 2014, the song, titled "Christ Conscious" was released as the album's second single. It was produced by Basquiat. The album's third single, titled "No. 99" was released on December 9, 2014. It was produced by Statik Selektah.

On December 23, 2014, 14 days later, the song, titled "Curry Chicken" was released as the album's fourth single. It was produced by Statik Selektah. On December 30, 2014, the song, titled "On & On" featuring Maverick Sabre and Dyemond Lewis, was released as the album's fifth single. It was produced by Freddie Joachim.

Joey Badass premiered the album's sixth single, "Teach Me" featuring Kiesza, on British radio station BBC Radio 1 as Zane Lowe's "Hottest Record" and received frequent airplay on these London radio stations; including Capital Xtra and BBC Radio 1Xtra. On January 19, 2015, a day before the album's release, the single was also featured on BBC Radio 1Xtra as the "Track of the Day". The song peaked at number 23 on the UK R&B Chart.

== Critical reception ==
Professional ratings
Aggregate scores
Source	Rating
Metacritic	75/100
Review scores
Source	Rating
AllMusic	3.5/5 stars
The A.V. Club	B
Consequence of Sound	B+
Exclaim	7/10
The Guardian	2/5 stars
HipHopDX	4/5 stars
PopMatters	8/10
Rolling Stone	3/5 stars
Slant Magazine	3.5/5 stars
Spin	5/10

B4.Da.$$ was met with generally positive reviews from music critics. Michael Madden of Consequence of Sound praised the album, noting that Joey's "wordplay, comparable to his friend Ab-Soul's, remains integral to his approach, but here he's more personal and purposeful than he was on his mixtapes, rapping about rapping but also lamenting the realities of being young and black in America." Vish Khanna of NOW Magazine also gave the album a positive review, saying that "his production choices (and those of Statik Selektah, Kirk Knight and Freddie Joachim) are innovative and timeless." Kyle Fowle of The A.V. Club gave the album a score of B, saying that Joey Badass "finally lives up to the expectations that have been thrust upon him, delivering a confident debut steeped in the history of hip-hop and simultaneously engaged with the current cultural climate." In a positive review, Ken Capobianco of The Boston Globe says that Joey Badass "speaks with a clear-eyed vision about growing up young and black in America. He’s often as playful as he is combative, asserting his place in hip-hop."

Full of praise for the album, Dave Heaton of PopMatters notes that the album "is strikingly similar in tone to the mixtapes; [Joey Badass] is not trying anything different, but rather continuing what's worked well for him. But everything is more refined and better expressed; there are also songs that stand out more as anthems." Nathan Fisher of Inveterate also chips in with another positive review, stating that fans of Joey Badass "will no doubt be impressed and satisfied with what he delivers, which is a mature improvement on his first two efforts, showing clear growth in both delivery and lyrical content." Jesse Cataldo of Slant Magazine gave the album three-and-a-half stars, saying that it "deftly traverses the different economies of the rap world, from the desperate hustle of the streets to the showy wastefulness of the club and the tricky minefield of the music business." Dan Rys of XXL praised the album, noting that "it just so happens that this story is a lot more personal than the 'fuck bitches, get money, do drugs, buy diamonds' aesthetic of so many of [Joey Badass'] peers in the rap game."

Edwin Ortiz of Complex gave the album a mixed review, saying that it "finds a way to balance out the confines of revivalist '90s rap with deeper tracks that play up a more introspective Joey." However, he continues to say that Joey Badass' potential is only "half-realised" on the album, "which speaks to his lack of adjustment in transitioning into a full-fledged artist who truly represents something other than '90s nostalgia rap." David Turner of Rolling Stone gave the album three stars, stating that the album "still sounds like it's stuck in the past, with solid production from old-school legend DJ Premier and his latter-day disciple Statik Selektah." B4.DA.$$ received a mostly positive review from Rebecca Haithcoat of Spin, saying that Joey Badass' style is characterized by "often-poetic lyrics rapped in a blunted monotone over moody production" and is "skilled, but not always very fun. Unless you're a teenager trying to establish aesthetic lines in the sand or an old hip-hop head who still gets excited about a Wu-Tang Clan reunion show, over the course of an hour those cloudy beats and Badass' unrelenting, I-really-mean-it flow get kinda tedious." Paul MacInnes of The Guardian gave the album 2 stars, saying that the album "is often set at the middling pace of a Fugees B-side, and a rapper whose technical abilities are damn close to those old timers he seeks to emulate. In the end, the album is just enough to make the affair interesting."

== Commercial performance ==
B4.Da.$$ debuted at number five on the US Billboard 200, earning 58,000 album-equivalent units (including 54,000 copies in pure album sales) in its first week, according to Nielsen Soundscan. This became Joey Bada$$'s first US top-ten debut. The tally made B4.Da.$$ the top rap album of the week, outperforming Lupe Fiasco's Tetsuo & Youth, also released on January 20, which entered the Billboard 200 at number 14. In its second week, the album fell to number 41 on the chart, selling an additional earning additional 13,000 units. On March 4, 2015, Joey Badass announced on Instagram, that the sales for his album had surpassed 120,000 copies. As of March 2017, the album has sold over 227,000 copies in the United States, according to Nielsen SoundScan.

== Track listing ==
Credits adapted from the album's official liner notes.

B4.Da.$$
No.	Title	Writer(s)	Producer(s)	Length
1.	"Save the Children"	Jo-Vaughn Scott; Patrick Baril	Statik Selektah	3:35
2.	"Greenbax (Introlude)"	Scott; Lee Bannon	Lee Bannon	0:48
3.	"Paper Trails"	Scott; Christopher Martin	DJ Premier	3:14
4.	"Piece of Mind"	Scott; Freddie Joachim	Joachim	3:38
5.	"Big Dusty"	Scott; Kirlan Labarrie	Kirk Knight	4:53
6.	"Hazeus View"	Scott; Labarrie	Kirk Knight; 1-900^{[a]}	3:39
7.	"Like Me" (featuring BJ the Chicago Kid)	Scott; Bryan Sledge; James Yancey; Tariq Collins; Ahmir Thompson; Kamal Gray; Frank Walker; Kirk Douglas; Damon Bryson; James Poyser; Mark Kelley	J Dilla; The Roots; 1-900^{[a]}	4:28
8.	"Belly of the Beast" (featuring Chronixx)	Scott; Jamar McNaughton; Chauncey Hollis	Hit-Boy	3:56
9.	"No. 99"	Scott; Baril	Statik Selektah; 1-900^{[a]}	2:46
10.	"Christ Conscious"	Scott	Basquiat	2:53
11.	"On & On" (featuring Dyemond Lewis and Maverick Sabre)	Scott; Dyemond Lewis; Michael Stafford; Joachim	Joachim	4:40
12.	"Escape 120" (featuring Raury)	Scott; Raury Tullis; Che Jessamy	Chuck Strangers	3:47
13.	"Black Beetles"	Scott; Jessamy	Chuck Strangers; 1-900^{[a]}	3:50
14.	"O.C.B."	Scott; Sam Baker; Roman Orlow; Janusz Bibik	Samiyam	3:43
15.	"Curry Chicken"	Scott; Baril	Statik Selektah; 1-900^{[a]}; Antman Wonder^{[a]}	3:33
Total length:				53:26

Deluxe edition (bonus tracks)
No.	Title	Writer(s)	Producer(s)	Length
16.	"Run Up On Ya" (featuring Action Bronson and Elle Varner)	Scott; Arian Asllani; Elle Varner; Baril	Statik Selektah	4:08
17.	"Teach Me" (featuring Kiesza)	Scott; Kiesa Ellestad; Jessamy; Corey Latif Williams; St. John	ASTR; Chuck Strangers	4:18

Notes

- ^{^[a]} signifies an additional producer
- "Greenbax (Introlude)" and "Like Me" features additional vocals by Kirk Knight
- "Piece of Mind" features additional vocals by Dyemond Lewis
- "Big Dusty" features additional vocals by James Niche
- "Hazeus View" features additional vocals by Francesca Guzman
- "No.99" and "O.C.B" features additional vocals by Wayne "Heirowayne" Harewood
- "Curry Chicken" features additional vocals by Cole Williams

"Big Dusty"
29-second sample of "Big Dusty", the fifth track on and debut single from the album.

"Teach Me"
26-second sample of "Teach Me", the second bonus track on and sixth single from the album.

== Personnel ==
Credits for B4.Da.$$ adapted from AllMusic.

- Action Bronson – featured artist
- ASTR – producer
- Lee Bannon – producer
- Basquiat – producer
- BJ the Chicago Kid – featured artist
- Mark Christensen – mastering
- Chronixx – featured artist
- DJ Premier – producer
- Francesca Guzman – vocals
- Wayne "Heirowayne" Harewood – vocals, A&R
- Hit-Boy – producer, mixing
- J Dilla – producer
- Joey Badass – primary artist, executive producer, A&R
- Freddie Joachim – producer
- Kiesza – featured artist
- Kirk Knight – producer, vocals
- Andrew Krivonos – engineer, mixing, sequencing
- Dyemond Lewis – featured artist, vocals
- Maverick Sabre – featured artist
- Nastee – mixing
- James Niche – vocals
- Adam Pallin – additional production
- Parks – mixing
- Raury – featured artist
- Anthony Reid – additional production
- The Roots – instrumentation
- Amanda Rosenthal – project manager
- Samiyam – producer
- Jonny Shipes – executive producer
- The Soul Rebels – instrumentation
- Statik Selektah – producer, mixing
- Chuck Strangers – producer
- Tony Whign – art direction, design
- Elle Varner – featured artist
- Brady Watt – bass guitar
- Cas Weinbren – keyboards
- Cole Williams – vocals

== Charts ==
=== Weekly charts ===
2015 chart performance for B4.Da.$$
Chart (2015)	Peak position
Australian Albums (ARIA)	17
Canadian Albums (Billboard)	8
Dutch Albums (Album Top 100)	69
New Zealand Albums (RMNZ)	11
Swiss Albums (Schweizer Hitparade)	24
UK Albums (OCC)	28
UK R&B Albums (OCC)	3
US Billboard 200	5
US Independent Albums (Billboard)	1
US Top R&B/Hip-Hop Albums (Billboard)	1
US Indie Store Album Sales (Billboard)	3

2022 chart performance for B4.Da.$$
Chart (2022)	Peak position
German Albums (Offizielle Top 100)	45

=== Year-end charts ===
Chart (2015)	Position
US Top R&B/Hip-Hop Albums (Billboard)	44

== Release history ==
Region	Date	Format	Label
United Kingdom	January 20, 2015	CD, digital download	Cinematic, Relentless, Sony Music UK
United States	January 20, 2015	CD, digital download	Pro Era, Cinematic, RED
Worldwide	January 27, 2015	LP	Pro Era, Cinematic, RED
Japan	February 8, 2015	CD, digital download	Cinematic, Sony Music Japan
