= Disguise the Limit =

Mixtape by Nyck Caution
- Released: February 29, 2016
- Recorded: 2013–2016
- Genre: Hip hop; alternative hip hop
- Length: 50:57
- Label: Cinematic; Pro Era
- Producer: Bruce LeeKix; Chuck Strangers; J Money; Jake Birch; Kirk Knight; Metro Boomin; Navie D; Rami Afuni; Rel; Sharp; Slauson Malone

Nyck Caution chronology
The Pursuit, Vol. 1 (2011)	Disguise the Limit (2016)

Disguise the Limit is the debut mixtape by American rapper Nyck Caution. It was released on February 29, 2016, by Cinematic Music Group and Pro Era.

== Background ==
The mixtape includes features from Pro Era members Joey Bada$$ and Kirk Knight, as well as Madison Iman, Tyler Sherrit, The Mind, and Alex Mali. The mixtape includes production from Kirk Knight, Chuck Strangers, Rel & Sharp, Bruce LeeKix, Navie D, Slauson Malone, J Money, and Metro Boomin.

== Singles ==
On January 7, 2016, Nyck Caution released the music video for "Church". A week later, he released three new tracks, "Nyctophilia", "Light Through The Cracks (Oh My Freestyle)", and "What's Understood". On March 11, he released the music video for "Basin".

== Track listing ==
Producer credits adapted from Pro Era's official website.

No.	Title	Writer(s)	Producer(s)	Length
1.	"The Pursuit"	Jesse Cordasco	Rami Afuni; Chuck Strangers	3:17
2.	"Inspire the Escape" (featuring Madison Iman)	Cordasco	Sharp; Rel	4:20
3.	"Baptize"	Cordasco	Kirk Knight; Jake Birch	2:51
4.	"Crucifix" (featuring Joey Bada$$ and Albey Balgochian)	Cordasco; Jo-Vaughn Scott; Albey Balgochian	Bruce LeeKix; Birch	6:05
5.	"Basin"	Cordasco	Kirk Knight	3:31
6.	"Show No Love" (featuring Kirk Knight)	Cordasco; Kirlan Labarrie	Kirk Knight	4:10
7.	"Just In Case" (featuring Alex Mali)	Cordasco	Kirk Knight	2:48
8.	"Somebody" (featuring Tyler Sheritt)	Cordasco	Navie D	4:32
9.	"Density"	Cordasco	Slauson Malone	2:45
10.	"Wordsmith"	Cordasco	Kirk Knight	3:09
11.	"Church" (featuring Alex Mali)	Cordasco	Slauson Malone	4:22
12.	"Out of Reach" (featuring The Mind and Alex Mali)	Cordasco	Kirk Knight	5:21
13.	"Holding Back"	Cordasco	J Money; Birch	3:46
Total length:				50:57

Bonus track
No.	Title	Writer(s)	Producer(s)	Length
14.	"What's Understood" (featuring Joey Bada$$)	Cordasco; Scott; Leland Wayne	Metro Boomin	3:56
