= Flytrap =

Flytrap may refer to:

- A fly-killing device
- Venus flytrap, a carnivorous plant
- Flytrap (Whitecross album), 1996
- Flytrap (CJ Fly album), 2016
