= Thee Way Eye See It =

Mixtape by CJ Fly
- Released: October 5, 2013
- Recorded: 2012–2013
- Genre: Hip-hop
- Length: 73:48
- Label: Cinematic Music Group
- Producer: Arc; Backpack; BrandUn DeShay; Chef Gold; Chuck Strangers; Cookin' Soul; Cy Fyre; The Entreproducers; ESTA; Jules Strangelove; King CARLOW; Lee Bannon; Statik Selektah

CJ Fly chronology
Thee Way Eye See It (2013)	Flytrap (2016)

Thee Way Eye See It is the debut mixtape by American rapper CJ Fly. It was released as a free digital download on DatPiff on October 5, 2013.

== Background ==
The mixtape features production from Statik Selektah, BrandUn DeShay, Cookin' Soul, ESTA, King Carlow (formerly known as Carnage), The Entreproducers, Chuck Strangers, Lee Bannon, Cy Fyre, Backpack, and Chef Gold. The mixtape also features guest appearances from members of Pro Era, Ab-Soul, Chelsea Reject, Buckshot, Phife Dawg, and Erick Arc Elliott. Music videos have been released for "Still the Motto", "Day zZz's", "Ernee", "Eyetalian Frenchip", "Q&A", and "Sup Preme" which was hosted by Complex Magazine.

== Track listing ==
No.	Title	Producer(s)	Length
1.	"FLintroCK"	Cy Fyre	3:00
2.	"Tug-At-War"	ESTA	3:54
3.	"Ernee" (featuring Dirty Sanchez)	Lee Bannon	4:02
4.	"Day zZz's"	Statik Selektah	2:54
5.	"Loco Motives"	ESTA; King CARLOW	7:03
6.	"Eyetalian Frenchip"	The Entreproducers	3:21
7.	"Q&A"	ESTA	3:38
8.	"Crew's Cunt Troll"	Chef Gold	5:00
9.	"Side" (featuring Buckshot)	The Entreproducers	4:48
10.	"Left Get"	Backpack	2:52
11.	"Too Paid"	Chuck Strangers	4:50
12.	"Sadderdaze" (featuring Ab-Soul)	BrandUn DeShay	3:38
13.	"Still the Motto"	Cookin' Soul	3:20
14.	"Sup Preme" (featuring Joey Bada$$)	King CARLOW	2:27
15.	"Seek Well" (featuring Aaron Rose and Phife Dawg)	Jules Strangelove	4:24
16.	"Outro-wed" (featuring Erick the Architect)	Arc	7:38
17.	"Thee Heiiist" (featuring Dessy Hinds, Chelsea Reject and T'nah Apex)	King CARLOW	3:55
18.	"The Error"	Cookin' Soul	3:04
