= 2000 (Joey Badass album) =

Studio album by Joey Badass
- Released: July 22, 2022
- Recorded: 2018–2022
- Genres: Hip-hop; East Coast hip-hop; jazz rap
- Length: 52:56
- Labels: Pro Era; Cinematic; Columbia
- Producers: 0445c; BBearded; Cardiak; Chuck Strangers; DopeBoyzMuzic; Dreamlife Beats; Erick the Architect; Fred Warmsley; Kirk Knight; Mark Borino; Marz; Heavy Mellow; MarvinoBeats; McClenney; Mike Will Made It; Rahki; Sal Dali; Sean C & LV; Statik Selektah

Joey Badass chronology
All-Amerikkkan Badass (2017)	2000 (2022)	Lonely at the Top (2025)

Singles from 2000
- 1. "Head High" Released: March 3, 2022; 2. "Where I Belong" Released: July 1, 2022; 3. "Survivors Guilt" Released: July 7, 2022; 4. "Zipcodes" Released: July 15, 2022

2000 is the third studio album by American rapper Joey Badass. It was released on July 22, 2022, through Pro Era Records and Cinematic Music Group with license to Columbia Records. The album features guest appearances from Diddy, Westside Gunn, Larry June, Chris Brown, Capella Grey, and JID. Production of the album was handled by Statik Selektah, Chuck Strangers, Erick the Architect, Mike Will Made It, Kirk Knight, Fred Warmsley, and Cardiak, among others.

== Background ==
Shortly after the release of All-Amerikkkan Badass, Joey Badass started working on and experimenting with new music. Despite working on various albums, many of them were either scrapped or never released. One of the albums was called Survivors Guilt, whose premise centered more on loss and grief, an album that Joey compared to that of Kendrick Lamar's 2022 album Mr. Morale & the Big Steppers. The project was scrapped after realizing that Joey wanted to make an album that's more "therapeutic and introspective." That title would later show up in 2000 as the title of a song about the loss of fellow rapper and former Pro Era member Capital Steez.

On May 11, 2022, Joey announced the title of his third studio album, with the original release date being planned for June 17, 2022, 5 days after the 10-year anniversary of the mixtape, 1999. However, the album was delayed by a month, with Joey revealing on social media that it was due to sample clearance issues. The album was eventually released on July 22, 2022. The album plays as a more mature and spiritual successor to the mixtape, and Joey delves into growing up in Brooklyn and finding a way to success, with Joey describing the album as a "victory lap."

== Release and promotion ==
On March 3, 2022, Joey Badass released the first single from the album titled "Head High", alongside a Colors Studio performance. On July 1, the second single, "Where I Belong" was released with an accompanying music video. The third single, "Survivors Guilt" was released on July 7, which is known as "Steez Day" dedicated to the late Capital Steez. On July 15, the fourth single "Zipcodes", was released with a music video. In July 2022, Joey Badass went on a 20-date summer concert tour, called the 1999-2000 Tour, with Capella Grey as the opening act.

On September 2, the album was updated on digital streaming platforms, with the Statik Selektah-produced song "Let It Breathe" being added to the tracklist as the twelfth track on the album. The song was originally released as a music video on January 20, 2021 (Joey's 26th birthday) via YouTube, before releasing as an official single in August 2022.

== Critical reception ==
Professional ratings
Aggregate scores
Source	Rating
Metacritic	74/100
Review scores
Source	Rating
Allmusic	3.5/5 stars
Pitchfork	6.8/10
Rolling Stone	3/5 stars

Rolling Stone noted Joey Badass for being a "charismatic hero" and offered criticism towards the album's direction, noting "At times, 2000 strains under its ambition. It's unclear whether Bada$$ wants to build an Important Album or simply release something commensurate with his growing celebrity." Pitchfork gave a positive review of 2000, praising the album's production. "The wide-ranging production often makes it easy to ignore the rough spots. Classy instrumental interpolations and crossover beats. It's a testament to Joey's growing ear that he sounds good on all of them." However, Pitchfork also called 2000 "underwhelming" in comparison to the buildup the album had since the release of 1999 in 2012.

== Track listing ==
2000 track listing
No.	Title	Writer(s)	Producer(s)	Length
1.	"The Baddest" (featuring Diddy)	Jo-Vaughn Scott; Sean Combs; Christopher McClenney; Erick Elliott; Eldra DeBarge; Etterlene DeBarge; William DeBarge	McClenney; Erick the Architect	2:44
2.	"Make Me Feel"	Scott; Patrick Baril; Jan Branicki; Angela Winbush	Statik Selektah; Dreamlife Beats	2:58
3.	"Where I Belong"	Scott; Baril; Tommaso Pinto; Alessandro Pinto	DopeBoyzMuzic; Statik Selektah	3:08
4.	"Brand New 911" (featuring Westside Gunn)	Scott; Alvin Worthy; Che Jessamy; Larry Bailey	Chuck Strangers; DopeBoyzMuzic; 0445c; Fred Warmsley	2:59
5.	"Cruise Control"	Scott; Michael Williams II; Marquell Middlebrooks; Carl McCormick	Mike Will Made It; Marz; Cardiak	3:27
6.	"Eulogy"	Scott; Baril; Branicki; T. Pinto; A. Pinto; Fred Warmsley III	Statik Selektah; Dreamlife Beats; DopeBoyzMuzic; 0445c; Fred Warmsley	4:05
7.	"Zipcodes"	Scott; Kirlan Labarrie; Mark Borino	Mark Borino; Kirk Knight	4:27
8.	"One of Us" (featuring Larry June)	Scott; Larry Hendricks III; Baril; Demetrius Shipp, Jr.	Statik Selektah	4:03
9.	"Welcome Back" (featuring Chris Brown and Capella Grey)	Scott; Christopher Brown; Shajuan Andrews; Terius Gray	BBearded	3:43
10.	"Show Me"	Scott; Baril; Everett Romano; Dragos Chiriac	Statik Selektah; Heavy Mellow	3:40
11.	"Wanna Be Loved" (featuring JID)	Scott; Destin Route; Jane Vaquer; Gay Vaquer; Powers Pleasant	Chuck Strangers	3:35
12.	"Head High"	Scott; Baril; Jan Braneki; Pacal Bayley	Statik Selektah	3:01
13.	"Survivors Guilt"	Scott; Columbus Smith III; Michael Flowers	Rahki	5:53
14.	"Written in the Stars"	Scott; Delano Matthews; Levar Coppin; Sal Dali; Andy Attanasio	Sean C & LV; Sal Dali; MarvinoBeats	5:13
Total length:				52:56

Notes

- The track "Let It Breathe" (produced by Statik Selektah) was included as the twelfth track on a later version of the album released on Apple Music and Spotify.
- "Cruise Control" features additional vocals by Nas.

Sample Credits

- "The Baddest" contains a sample from "I Like It", written by Eldra DeBarge, Etterlene DeBarge, and William DeBarge, as performed by DeBarge.
- "Make Me Feel" contains a sample from "Something in the Way (You Make Me Feel)", written by Angela Winbush, as performed by Stephanie Mills.
- "Brand New 911" contains samples from "Total Satisfaction", written by Larry Bailey, as performed by Brief Encounter.
- "Zipcodes" contains uncredited samples from "Don't Say Hello, Don't Say Goodbye", written by Chude Mondlane, as performed by Shoody.
- "Show Me" contains samples from "Show Me How", written by Dragos Chiriac, as performed by Men I Trust.

== Charts ==
Chart performance for 2000
Chart (2022–2023)	Peak position
Australian Albums (ARIA)	41
Belgian Albums (Ultratop Flanders)	69
Belgian Albums (Ultratop Wallonia)	186
Canadian Albums (Billboard)	38
Dutch Albums (Album Top 100)	49
French Albums (SNEP)	152
Irish Albums (IRMA)	68
Lithuanian Albums (AGATA)	89
New Zealand Albums (RMNZ)	13
Swiss Albums (Schweizer Hitparade)	25
UK Albums (Official Charts)	55
UK R&B Albums (Official Charts)	8
US Billboard 200	25
US Top R&B/Hip-Hop Albums (Billboard)	15
