= Beast Coast =

American hip hop collective

- Origin: Brooklyn, New York City, U.S.
- Genres: Hip hop
- Years active: 2012–present
- Labels: Beast Coast Media, LLC; Columbia
- Members: Pro Era; Flatbush Zombies; The Underachievers

Beast Coast is an American hip hop collective and supergroup from Brooklyn, New York, formed in 2012 by the members of Pro Era, Flatbush Zombies, and the Underachievers. The collective has been on multiple tours together, and their debut group album Escape from New York was released on May 24, 2019.

== History ==
Beast Coast was formed in 2012, but the relationships within the group members date back to the time growing up together in the Brooklyn neighborhoods of Flatbush and Bedford–Stuyvesant. Pro Era formed their collective while attending Edward R. Murrow High School. The Underachievers and Zombie Juice became acquainted through a childhood friend of AK the Savior. The co-founder of Pro Era, Capital Steez, died by suicide in December 2012, followed by the death of ASAP Yams in 2015, who is credited for introducing Pro Era to the Flatbush Zombies.

In 2019, the supergroup released three singles ahead of their debut album, Escape from New York, released on May 24, 2019. The group also announced a North American tour beginning on July 23 and ending on August 16.

== Members ==
=== Current ===
- Joey Bada$$
- Kirk Knight
- CJ Fly
- Meechy Darko
- Zombie Juice
- Erick Arc Elliott
- AK the Savior
- Issa Gold
- Nyck Caution
- Powers Pleasant
- Aaron Rose
- Chuck Strangers
- Dessy Hinds
- Dirty Sanchez
- Danny Phantom 47
- J.A.B.
- Jakk The Rhymer
- Rokamouth

=== Former ===
- Capital Steez (deceased)

== Discography ==
=== Studio albums ===
Title	Details	Peak chart positions		
Title	Details	US	AUS	NZ
Escape from New York	Released: May 24, 2019; Label: Beast Coast Media; Formats: Digital download, streaming	29	95	32

=== Singles ===
Title	Year	Peak chart positions	Album
Title	Year	NZ Hot	Album
"Left Hand" (featuring Joey Bada$$, Flatbush Zombies, The Underachievers, Kirk Knight, Nyck Caution, and CJ Fly)	2019	—	Escape from New York
"Coast/Clear" (featuring Joey Bada$$, Flatbush Zombies, Kirk Knight, Nyck Caution, and Issa Gold)	2019	—	Escape from New York
"Snow in the Stadium" (featuring Erick the Architect, Joey Bada$$, Meechy Darko, Kirk Knight, CJ Fly, and Issa Gold)	2019	36	Escape from New York

=== Other charted songs ===
Title	Year	Peak chart positions	Album
Title	Year	NZ Hot	Album
"Distance"	2019	29	Escape from New York
"It Ain't Easy, It Ain't Easy"	2019	39	Escape from New York
