= 1999 (mixtape) =

Debut mixtape by American rapper Joey Badass

Mixtape by Joey Badass
- Released: June 12, 2012
- Recorded: 2011–2012
- Genre: East Coast hip hop; jazz rap
- Length: 61:29
- Label: Cinematic Music Group
- Producer: Chuck Strangers; Lewis Parker; Lord Finesse; MF Doom; J Dilla; Vin Skully; Knxwledge; Statik Selektah; Bruce LeeKix

Joey Badass chronology
1999 (2012)	Summer Knights (2013)

Singles from 1999
- 1. "Waves" Released: November 9, 2012

1999 is the debut mixtape by American rapper Joey Bada$$. It was released independently as a free digital download on June 12, 2012. The mixtape is a tribute to 1990s East Coast hip hop, featuring boom bap production and lyrical themes reflecting Joey's experiences as a teenager in Brooklyn. The mixtape incorporates elements of jazz rap, conscious hip hop, and old school hip hop. The mixtape contains guest appearances from fellow Pro Era members Capital STEEZ, CJ Fly, and Chuck Strangers, as well as T'nah Apex. Production was handled primarily by various members of Pro Era, including Chuck Strangers and Kirk Knight, along with sampled beats from established producers like Lord Finesse, MF Doom, and J Dilla. Videos were released for the tracks "Hardknock", "Survival Tactics", "FromdaTomb$", and "Waves". The mixtape's cover art features a childhood photo of Joey Bada$$, emphasizing the youthful perspective presented in the lyrics. 1999 was widely acclaimed by music critics and is considered Joey Bada$$'s breakthrough project.

In May 2022, Joey Bada$$ announced that his next album would be a sequel to 1999, titled 2000. The album was released shortly after 1999's tenth anniversary on July 22, 2022.

== Release ==
1999 was released on June 12, 2012, as free digital download. After B4.Da.$$ was released, 1999 and another mixtape Summer Knights became available on iTunes for sale. On June 12, 2018, 1999 was released on Spotify and TIDAL. The instrumental of track 9 "Funky Ho's" was changed upon the re-release, removing an uncleared sample so that the album could be placed on digital streaming services and released on vinyl.

== Critical reception ==
Professional ratings
Review scores
Source	Rating
AllHipHop	8.5/10
AllMusic	4/5 stars
HipHopDX	4/5 stars
Pitchfork Media	8.0/10
Spin	6/10

1999 was met with widespread critical acclaim, and general interest upon its release. The mixtape was nominated for mixtape of the year by BET. Pitchfork Media gave the mixtape an 8 out of 10 rating and praised his old soul, and Golden age sound. Tom Breihan of Stereogum wrote: "What confounds me is that a high school kid from Flatbush is making music this era-specific, and, more importantly, that he's so good at it." Joshua R. Weaver of The Root remarked that 1999 "showcases the burgeoning renaissance of a hip-hop sound and vibe that far precedes the teenaged rapper."

Jesse Fairfax of HipHopDX opined that the mixtape's "careful tracing of long established blueprints gives rise to debate on whether the newcomer presents a worthwhile reminder of Hip Hop's so-called glory days or if he risks placing himself in a nostalgic box". Concluding the review for AllHipHop, King Eljay claimed that, "With a movement and ambition that mirrors today's most successful artists, and a sound that is so authentic and ripe, 1999 is awesome. This is a project that will make any Hip-Hop listener excited." Christopher R. Weingarten was more critical in the review for Spin, calling it, "too often the lounge-iest in the Lyricist Lounge."

Reviewing the mixtape for AllMusic, Paul Simpson declared that it, "rightfully remains one of the most praised rap mixtapes of the 2010s." 1999 was ranked the 38th best album of 2012 by Complex. The Versed named it "Mixtape of the Year". It was also named one of the best mixtapes of the year by HipHopDX.

== Track listing ==
Credits are adapted from the album's liner notes, unless otherwise indicated.

1999 track listing
No.	Title	Producer(s)	Length
1.	"Summer Knights"	Chuck Strangers	1:56
2.	"Waves"	Freddie Joachim	3:32
3.	"FromdaTombs" (featuring Chuck Strangers)	Chuck Strangers	3:25
4.	"Survival Tactics" (featuring Capital STEEZ)	Vin Skully	3:23
5.	"Killuminati" (featuring Capital STEEZ)	Knxwledge	2:34
6.	"Hardknock" (featuring CJ Fly)	Lewis Parker	5:18
7.	"World Domination"	MF Doom	2:43
8.	"Pennyroyal"	MF Doom	2:50
9.	"Funky Ho's"	Lord Finesse	4:29
10.	"Daily Routine"	Chuck Strangers	2:58
11.	"Snakes" (featuring T'Nah Apex)	J Dilla	4:19
12.	"Don't Front" (featuring CJ Fly)	Statik Selektah	4:22
13.	"Righteous Minds"	Bruce LeeKix	3:44
14.	"Where It's At" (featuring Kirk Knight)	J Dilla	4:09
15.	"Third Eye Shit" (featuring Pro Era, Capital STEEZ, CJ Fly, Chuck Strangers, Dyemond Lewis, Nyck Caution, Kirk Knight, Rokamouth, T'nah Apex & Dessy Hinds)	Chuck Strangers	11:47
Total length:			61:29

Notes

- "FromdaTombs" features DJ scratches performed by Statik Selektah.
- On the June 12, 2018 re-release of 1999, the track "Suspect" was retitled "Third Eye Shit."

Sample credits

- "Summer Knights" contains a sample of "Summer Nights", performed by Lonnie Liston Smith.
- "Waves" contains a sound bite of Tupac Shakur.
- "Waves" also contains a sample of "Waves" by Freddie Joachim (Instrumental)
- "FromdaTombs" contains a sample of "Main Theme (Piano & Trumpet)" by Andrew Hale, from the video game L.A. Noire.
- "Survival Tactics" contains a sample of "Survival Tactics" by Styles of Beyond.
- "Killuminati" contains a sample of "WhºK∆res" by Knxwledge.
- "Hardknock" contains a sample of "Eyes Of Dreams" by Lewis Parker.
- "World Domination" contains dialogue excerpts from Pinky and the Brain.
- "World Domination" also contains a sample of "The Fat Albert Halloween Special" by Ray Ellis, which MF Doom had sampled before in "Poo-Putt Platter", as "Datura Stramonium" in the instrumental version.
- "Pennyroyal" contains a sample of "Cathedral" by Galt MacDermot and also interpolates the song "Song Cry" by Jay-Z.
- "Funky Ho's" contains a sample of "All Night" by Xperadó.
- "Daily Routine" contains a sample of "The Highways of My Life" by The Isley Brothers.
- "Snakes" contains a sample of "Alien Family" by J Dilla.
- "Don't Front" contains a sample of "Tudo Que Você Podia Ser" by Lô Borges.
- "Righteous Minds" contains a sample of "Holy Thursday" by David Axelrod.
- "Righteous Minds" also contains samples of "Love and Happiness" by Monty Alexander and "Hit Me with That" by The Beatnuts.

== Rejex ==
In September 2012, Joey Bada$$ released a mixtape named Rejex, which contains 14 tracks of original recordings and material that did not make it to the final version of 1999.

Rejex

Mixtape by Joey Badass
- Released: September 2012
- Recorded: 2011–2012
- Genre: East Coast hip hop; jazz rap
- Length: 36:29

No.	Title	Length
1.	"Intro"	1:15
2.	"Flow-ers"	2:23
3.	"Catharsis"	1:57
4.	"Indubitable"	2:39
5.	"oG killuminati"	1:28
6.	"Pantie Raid"	2:18
7.	"That Gushy"	2:51
8.	"Fantom"	1:37
9.	"Silent Night"	4:43
10.	"Oh Deer Beddar Daze"	2:23
11.	"DSL Da Special List"	3:19
12.	"Update"	5:04
13.	"Little Rachel"	1:53
14.	"This Feelin" (Bonus Track)	3:16
Total length:		36:29

== Charts ==
Chart performance for 1999
Chart (2022)	Peak position
Belgian Albums (Ultratop Flanders)	167

== See also ==
- Joey Badass discography
