= Summer Knights =

Mixtape by Joey Bada$$
- Released: July 1, 2013
- Recorded: 2012–2013
- Genre: East Coast hip hop
- Length: 70:00
- Label: Cinematic Music Group
- Producer: The Alchemist; Bruce LeeKix; Chuck Strangers; DJ Premier; Kirk Knight; Lee Bannon; MF Doom; Navie D; Oddisee; Statik Selektah

Joey Bada$$ chronology
1999 (2012)	Summer Knights (2013)	B4.Da.$$ (2015)

Singles from Summer Knights
- 1. "Unorthodox" Released: January 14, 2013; 2. "My Yout" Released: September 9, 2013

Summer Knights is the second mixtape by American rapper Joey Bada$$. It was released on July 1, 2013, by Cinematic Music Group. The mixtape was planned to be released as an EP, to prelude the release of his debut album B4.DA.$$, but instead it was announced to be a full-length mixtape. The mixtape features production from Chuck Strangers, Kirk Knight, MF Doom, Statik Selektah, DJ Premier, Lee Bannon, Oddisee, Navie D, and Bruce LeeKix. The mixtape features more original instrumentals than his first mixtape 1999 which was primarily samples.

The extended play has inverted into the re-release from the mixtape, titled Summer Knights EP; it was released on October 29, 2013.

== Background ==
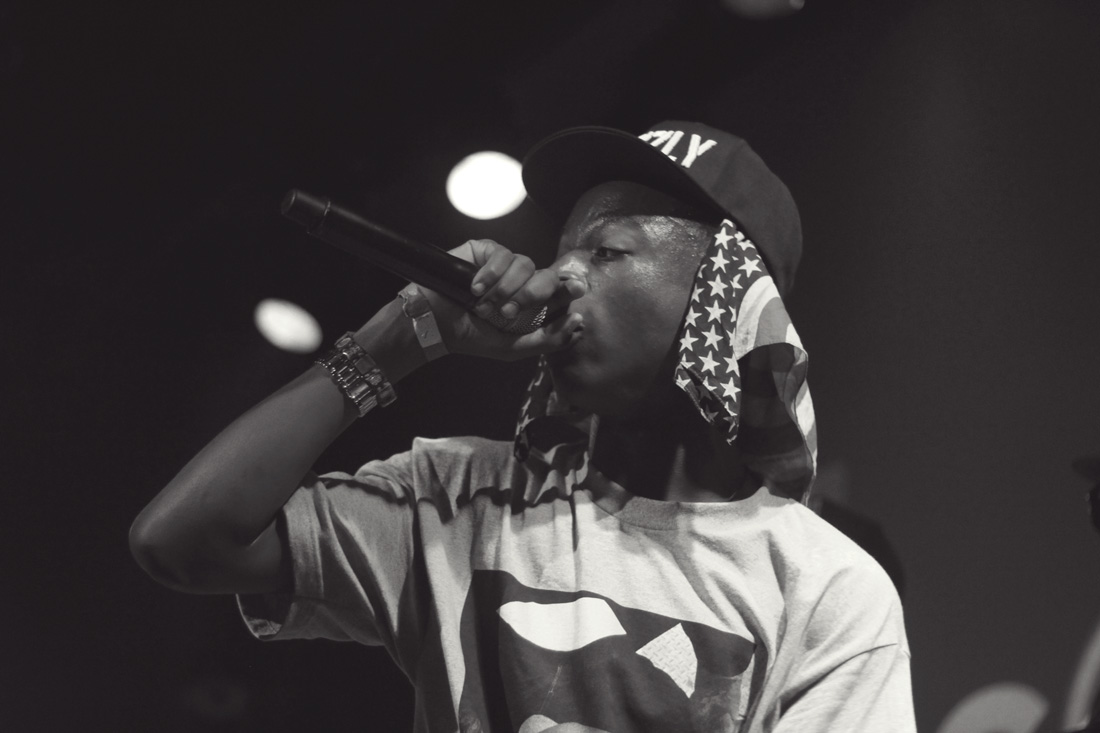
Joey Bada$$ worked with many producers for the mixtape, including MF Doom, Statik Selektah, DJ Premier, and Oddisee among others.

On May 22, 2013, Joey Bada$$ announced the official release date of his next solo project, Summer Knights EP on June 12, 2013, which marks as the one-year anniversary release of his breakthrough mixtape 1999. On May 28, 2013, Bada$$ announced Summer Knights will no longer be an EP, and instead announced that this project will just be a full-length mixtape. He revealed that the mixtape will feature 17 tracks, along with the production, which will be handled by Statik Selektah, Lee Bannon, Chuck Strangers and Kirk Knight, among others.

The mixtape features guest appearances by his fellow Pro Era members, along the additional production by DJ Premier, The Alchemist, MF Doom and Oddisee, among others. On the announced release date, Joey Badass revealed on Twitter that the mixtape was pushed back until July 1, 2013. This was also said to be a "rest in peace" mixtape to Pro Era founder and close friend Capital STEEZ, further indicated in the 16th track entitled "#LongLiveSTEELO."

== Critical reception ==
Professional ratings
Review scores
Source	Rating
CMJ	(favorable)
Consequence of Sound	3.5/5 stars
Exclaim!	7/10
RapReviews.com	7.5/10
Rolling Stone	3.5/5 stars
Spin	7/10
XXL	4/5 stars

Summer Knights received generally favorable reviews from music critics. At Metacritic, which assigns a normalized rating out of 100 to reviews from mainstream critics, the album received an average score of 66, which indicates "generally favorable", based on 10 reviews. Exclaim! magazine's Chris Dart found Badass' rapping versatile and skillful, and said that the mixtape is exceptional at its high points, despite being a few unnecessary songs overlong. Abrea Armstrong of XXL felt that his lyrics are still confident, but now informed by new life experiences, and recommended Summer Knights to hip hop buffs rather than Badass' typically teenage listeners, although she wrote that "Joey is here to prove that they're one in [sic] the same." In a mixed review, Phillip Mlynar of Spin felt that Summer Knights lacks the immediacy of his early music and found his rapping dull and enervated, which he mused is a result of pressures and expectations from the music industry.

On December 24, 2013, XXL positioned it at number 19 on their list of the best mixtapes of 2013. They commented saying, "One thing is clear when you listen to the tape, he’s not kidding around, as he unleashes some bone-shattering bars with a calm cold assassin-like demeanor. 1999 was more of a coming-of-age tale from Joey while Summer Knights provides as a worthy follow-up illustrating his maturity and growth. Pro-Era’s boom-bap ’90s chill-vibe is still prominent in the album, however with an extra kick making it sound very refreshing."

== Track listing ==
All credits are adapted from Allmusic.

No.	Title	Writer(s)	Producer(s)	Length
1.	"Alowha"	Jo-Vaughn Virginie Scott	Kirk Knight	4:41
2.	"Hilary $wank"	Scott	Lee Bannon	3:23
3.	"My Yout" (featuring Collie Buddz)	Scott; Colin Plunket Harper	Chuck Strangers	4:20
4.	"Death of YOLO" (featuring Smoke DZA)	Scott; Sean Pompey	Bruce LeeKix	4:24
5.	"Right on Time"	Scott	Kirk Knight	3:24
6.	"Sweet Dreams"	Scott	Navie D	3:42
7.	"47 Goonz" (featuring Dirty Sanchez and Nyck Caution)	Scott; Dirty Sanchez; Jesse Cordasco	Lee Bannon	3:06
8.	"Word Is Bond"	Scott	Statik Selektah	3:20
9.	"Sit N' Prey" (featuring T'nah Apex and Dessy Hinds)	Scott; T'nah Apex; Dessy Hinds	Navie D	4:40
10.	"Trap Door"	Scott	The Alchemist	2:52
11.	"Satellite" (featuring Chuck Strangers, Kirk Knight and Dessy Hinds)	Scott; Che Jessamy; Kirlan Labarrie; Dessy Hinds	Lee Bannon	5:04
12.	"95 Til' Infinity"	Scott	Lee Bannon	4:27
13.	"Amethyst Rockstar" (featuring Kirk Knight)	Scott; Labarrie	MF Doom	3:55
14.	"Reign"	Scott	Chuck Strangers	4:49
15.	"Sorry Bonita" (featuring Pro Era)	Scott; Chaine Downer, Jr.; Jessamy; Dyemond Lewis; Cordasco; Labarrie; A La $ole; Dirty Sanchez; Dessy Hinds	Oddisee	5:48
16.	"#LongLiveSteelo"	Scott	Kirk Knight	2:51
17.	"Unorthodox"	Scott	DJ Premier	3:37
Total length:				70:00

Summer Knights EP – iTunes re-release
No.	Title	Length
1.	"Hilary $wank"	3:22
2.	"My Yout (Remix)" (featuring Maverick Sabre)	3:40
3.	"Sit N' Prey" (featuring T'nah Apex and Dessy Hinds)	4:22
4.	"95 Til Infinity"	4:27
5.	"#LongLiveSteelo" (featuring T'nah Apex)	2:51
6.	"My Jeep" (featuring Flatbush Zombies, The Underachievers and Chuck Strangers)	4:35
7.	"My Yout" (featuring Collie Buddz)	3:32
Total length:		26:49

== Digital download ==
Most mixtapes are digital downloads that are free and are usually not released for any profit. Summer Knights, however, is available both for free download as well as purchase on iTunes and Google Play (the latter being available for free streaming as well).

== Personnel ==
All credits are adapted from AllMusic.

- The Alchemist – producer
- T'nah Apex – featured artist
- Lee Bannon – producer
- Collie Buddz – featured artist
- Nyck Caution – featured artist
- Navie D – producer
- Dirty Sanchez – featured artist
- DJ Premier – producer
- MF Doom – producer
- Dessy Hinds – featured artist
- Kirk Knight – featured artist, producer
- Oddisee – producer
- Pro Era – featured artists
- Rokamouth – featured artist
- Smoke DZA – featured artist
- Statik Selektah – producer
- Chuck Strangers – featured artist, producer
