= Unorthodox (Joey Badass song) =

Single by Joey Badass

from the album Summer Knights
- Released: January 14, 2013
- Recorded: 2012
- Genre: Hip hop
- Length: 3:37
- Label: Green Label Sound; Cinematic
- Songwriter: Jo-Vaughn Virginie Scott
- Producer: DJ Premier

Joey Badass singles chronology
"Enter the Void" (2012)	"Unorthodox" (2013)	"My Yout" (2013)

Audio sample
- "Unorthodox": file; help

Music video
- "Unorthodox" on YouTube

"Unorthodox" is the debut single by American hip hop recording artist Joey Badass, taken from his second solo mixtape, Summer Knights. The song was produced by DJ Premier. "Unorthodox" was released as the mixtape's first single on January 14, 2013 on iTunes.

== Background and composition ==
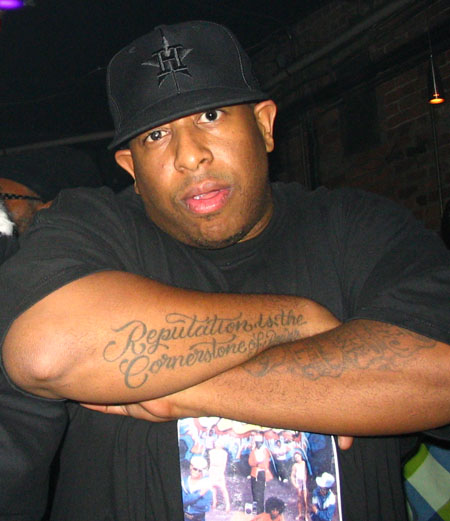
DJ Premier handled production for "Unorthodox".

Joey Badass made a one-off single deal with Mountain Dew's promotion team Green Label Sound. In an interview with HipHopDX he explained how he was able to work with DJ Premier: "Shout out to Mountain Dew and Green Label Sound for linking that up. I did a one-off single deal with Mountain Dew and they just hooked that up for me. I was like I'll do this for you, and we just gon' get you in the studio with Premier. That's how it happened. It was like a dream come true."

== Music video ==
The music video, directed by Coodie & Chike, was released on March 13, 2013 on Joey Badass' YouTube channel which he shares with his hip hop collective Pro Era. DJ Premier makes numerous appearances in the video. The video features animation visuals as through using rotoscope animation throughout the entire video. The visuals were created by designers CJ Cook, Luke Infinger, Ben Gabelman, and Jordan Taylor. The visuals were inspired by artist Evan Hecox. The description of the video has stated: "the goal was to capture the essence of the artists as the surrounding elements emphasized Joey's gritty lyrics."

=== Reception ===
MTV's Michael Depland has commented on the video saying: "Rappers like Brooklyn's Joey Badass are in the business of painting what writers call "word pictures." He's not just deft at turning a phrase and killing the delivery, but he's also especially good at constructing graphic and vivid tales via his lyrics—he gets you right in there. Now, in his video for the DJ Premier-produced "Unorthodox," a free single from Green Label Sound, Joey's words are literally brought to life. In the lush and colorful clip, the MTV Artist To Watch and Premier are covered in art and strange hues via rotoscoping, while animation illustrates the rapper's lyrics. Joey's verbose lyrical style makes for great visual storytelling, lucky for us, as his words spring to life around him. The Pro Era member has been on a tear lately with last month's video for "Underground Airplay," featuring Big K.R.I.T. and Smoke DZA and his collabo "Wendy N Becky" with Chance The Rapper. Plus, he'll be performing on the 2013 Woodies stage next week. OK, Joey, we knew you were going to be something to watch this year, but now you're just OVERDOING it. Well, we guess if "Unorthodox" represents one piece of art for you, all of 2013 is shaping up to be your masterpiece."

Complex commented on the video saying that "Joey and the boys are in a cartoonish New York City. DJ Premier, who produced the cut, even stops by for a jaunt around the construction paper cityscape."

== Critical reception ==
Pitchfork Media gave "Unorthodox" a positive review stating: "Joey Badass' mixtape 1999 essentially functioned as an audition to work with DJ Premier—his flow moves through these nineties loops so seamlessly that it was only a matter of time before the master of boom-bap took notice. And it's heartwarming to see that Joey doesn't shrink from the challenge once he's on the main stage. This dusty, tightly-wound vibrancy was tailor-made for him, and he rides it with panache, flipping through complicated rhyme schemes like a worn deck of cards.

MTV's Charlie Norwood has also praised the single stating: "Joey Badass is definitely riding some '90s nostalgia vibes on his latest track, "Unorthodox," with a classic hip-hop beat produced by none other than golden era icon DJ Premier. It was only a matter of time until the Brooklyn-bred '90s hip-hop revivalist (and MTV 2013 Artist To Watch) would hook up with hip-hop's Brooklyn godfather, and the beat is an instant classic, similar to DJ Premier's own (former) group, Gang Starr. With some obscure record samples chopped up with drum machine patterns and his signature scratches, Joey spits a super-lyrical flow, running through an endless string of multi-syllabic punch lines that would even make New York greats like Big Pun take notice. Chicago Reader positively reviewed the song saying: " With Premier's typically frosty production and Badass' impressively grimy vocals, "Unorthodox" sounds like something straight out of 1990, which is all the more remarkable when you consider that that was five years before the rapper was born."

Exclaim! editor Josiah Hudges gave the song a positive review saying: "The track sees Badass go in hard, spitting busy bars about everything from Jimmy Fallon to the fact that he won't sign to a major for anything less than three million dollars upfront. Best of all, however, is the fact that this track was produced by none other than DJ Premier. As could be expected, it's an immensely smooth, soulful slab of classic hip-hop. Clash praised the single stating: "It's a classic Premo beat that's accompanied with a tantalising sample laced with his signature scratches and Joey Badass does the track justice with his cocky bars and deep rooted NY flow."

== Track listing ==
Digital single

No.	Title	Writer(s)	Producer(s)	Length
1.	"Unorthodox"	Jo-Vaughn Virginie Scott	DJ Premier	3:37

== Release history ==
Country	Date	Format	Label
United States	January 14, 2013	Digital download	Green Label Sound, Cinematic Music Group

== See also ==
- Joey Badass discography
