= Flytrap (CJ Fly album) =

Studio album by CJ Fly
- Released: December 9, 2016
- Recorded: 2016
- Genre: Hip hop
- Length: 45:34
- Label: Pro Era; Cinematic
- Producer: dF; DJ RellyRell; King CARLOW; Kirk Knight; Matt Noble

CJ Fly chronology
Thee Way Eye See It (2013)	Flytrap (2016)	Rudebwoy (2020)

Singles from Flytrap
- 1. "Now You Know" Released: September 26, 2016

Professional ratings
Review scores
Source	Rating
HipHopDX	3.8/5

Flytrap is the debut studio album by American rapper CJ Fly. It was released on December 9, 2016, by Pro Era and Cinematic Music Group. It features a guest of appearance of Canadian rapper and producer Devontée, and additional vocals by American singer Eryn Allen Kane.

== Track listing ==
No.	Title	Length
1.	"Get Me"	3:32
2.	"Harder"	2:57
3.	"IDGAF"	2:35
4.	"Perennial"	2:35
5.	"Lethal Allure"	3:24
6.	"Get It Done" (featuring Devontée)	3:33
7.	"Dope"	2:13
8.	"Always / Confined"	5:27
9.	"Like the Beatles"	4:11
10.	"Now You Know"	2:39
11.	"Living the Life"	2:11
12.	"Vibrations"	3:35
13.	"Diamonds"	2:38
14.	"Downfall"	3:54
Total length:		45:34

Notes

- "Lethal Allure" and "Downfall" feature additional vocals by Eryn Allen Kane.
