= Kirk Knight =

American rapper and record producer (born 1995)

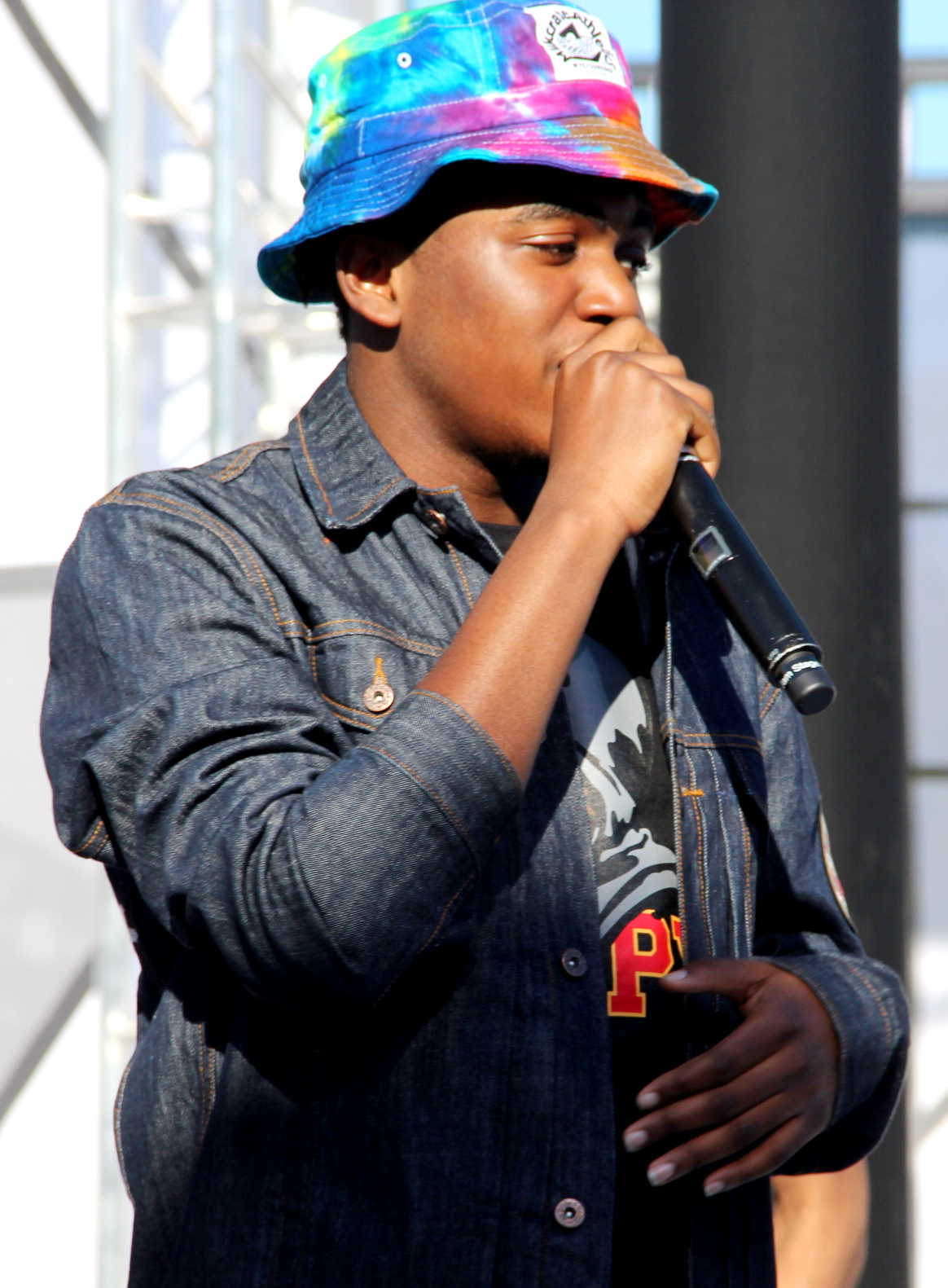
- Labarrie in 2013

Background information
- Also known as: Kirk Kneezy, The Kreeper, Young Dust, Kirk Killa
- Born: Kirlan Labarrie; November 16, 1995 (age 30); Brooklyn, New York, U.S.
- Genre: East Coast hip-hop
- Occupations: Record producer; rapper; songwriter
- Instrument: Akai MPC
- Years active: 2012–present
- Labels: Cinematic; Pro Era
- Member of: Pro Era; Beast Coast
- Website: www.thekreeper.com

Kirlan Labarrie (born November 16, 1995), better known by his stage name Kirk Knight, is an American record producer, rapper and member of the hip hop collective Pro Era. His debut album, Late Knight Special (2015), was released by Cinematic Music Group. On July 21, 2017, he released a collaborative project with fellow Pro Era member Nyck Caution, Nyck @ Knight, supported by the single"Off the Wall".

As a producer, he has produced top songs such as "Flem" by A$AP Ferg and "Big Dusty" by Joey Bada$$. Knight, as well as Joey Bada$$ of Pro Era, made hints at a solo album coming out in 2018 for Knight. Knight also went on tour in 2018 with the rap collective Flatbush Zombies along with fellow Pro Era member Nyck Caution.

== Discography ==
=== Studio albums ===
List of albums, with album details and selected chart positions
Title	Project details	Peak chart positions		
Title	Project details	US	US R&B/HH	US Rap
Late Knight Special (2015)	Debut studio album	—	33	—
Black Noise (2017)	Instrumental studio album	—	—	—
Nyck @ Knight (Note: With Nyck Caution as Nyck @ Knight.) (with Nyck Caution) (2017)	Collaborative EP	—	—	—
IIWII (2018)	Second studio album	—	—	—
After Dark (2021)	Third studio album	—	—	—
"—" denotes a recording that did not chart or was not released in that territory.

=== Production ===
The following is a list of albums in which Kirk Knight has produced as either producer or co-producer, showing year released, performing artists and album name.

Year	Artist(s)	Album
2012	Capital Steez	AmeriKKKan Korruption
2012	Capital Steez	AmeriKKKan Korruption Reloaded
2012	Joey Badass	Rejex
2012	Pro Era	PEEP: The aPROcalypse
2012	Pro Era	The Secc$ Tap.e
2013	Joey Badass	Summer Knights
2013	Joey Badass	Summer Knights EP
2013	Eckō Unltd.	Underground Airplay
2013	Peter Rosenberg, Eckō Unltd.	Underground Airplay 2: The New York Renaissance
2014	Mick Jenkins	The Water[s]
2014	Pro Era	The Secc$ Tap.e 2
2014	Pro Era	The Shift
2014	Smoke DZA	Dream.ZONE.Achieve
2015	Joey Badass	B4.DA.$$
2015	Kirk Knight	Late Knight Special
2016	Nyck Caution	Disguise the Limit
2016	Kirk Knight	Black Noise
2016	CJ Fly	Flytrap
2017	Joey Badass	All-Amerikkkan Bada$$
2017	Nyck @ Knight	Nyck @ Knight
2017	A$AP Ferg	Still Striving
2018
2018	Flatbush Zombies	Vacation In Hell

== Filmography ==
Year	Title	Role	Notes
Film
2017	Patti Cake$	Nomad	
