= Pro Era =

American hip hop collective

- Members of Pro Era pictured in 2015 (Note: Members from first to third row, left to right: CJ Fly and Dessy Hinds; Kwon Swank, SwankMaster RAW, Dyemond Lewis, J.A.B., Dirty Sanchez, Joey Bada$$, Kirk Knight and Rokamouth (seated); Sür Niles, Nyck Caution, Powers Pleasant and Aaron Rose.)

Background information
- Origin: Brooklyn, New York, U.S.
- Genre: Hip-hop
- Years active: 2011–present
- Label: Pro Era
- Spinoffs: Beast Coast
- Members: Aaron Rose; Chuck Strangers; CJ Fly; Dessy Hinds; Joey Badass; Kirk Knight; Nyck Caution; Powers Pleasant
- Past members: Capital STEEZ (deceased); Dirty Sanchez 47; Dyemond Lewis; JAB47; Jakk Da Rhymer; Rokamouth; SwankMasterRAW; T'nah Apex
- Website: www.theproera.com

Pro Era (short for Progressive Era) is an American hip-hop collective from Brooklyn, New York. The group is a collective of rappers and record producers that currently includes East Coast rappers Joey Badass, CJ Fly, Kirk Knight, Nyck Caution, Dessy Hinds and Aaron Rose, along with producers Chuck Strangers and Powers Pleasant. The collective was formed in 2011 by the late Capital STEEZ and Powers Pleasant, with Joey Badass and CJ Fly among its founding members.

== History ==
=== Music career ===
==== 2009–2011: The 3rd Kind and formation of Pro Era ====
Capital STEEZ (then known as JaY STeeZ) had started recording music around 2009. Around this time, STEEZ and his friend Jakk Da Rhymer (then known as BlakkJakk (The Rhymer)) formed a rap duo known as The 3rd Kind. The duo released their only mixtape, The Yellow Tape, in 2010. Shortly after the tape's release, STEEZ & Jakk parted ways as a duo but continued to work together as solo artists.

In the spring of 2011, while still a student at Edward R. Murrow High School in Brooklyn, New York, Capital STEEZ had a performance at a cafe in Clinton Hill, Brooklyn, with friends including Powers Pleasant, Joey Badass and Dirty Sanchez also in attendance to show him support. On their way home from the performance, he and Powers Pleasant came up with the idea of forming a hip hop collective, which they named "Progressive Era", or "Pro Era" for short. In addition to the two co-founders, Joey Badass, Dirty Sanchez and CJ Fly were brought into the group as founding members.

=== 2012: Rise in popularity and death of Capital STEEZ ===
The Pro Era collective signed with the Cinematic Music Group label in 2012, shortly after Jonny Shipes became the manager of Joey Badass. On February 14, 2012, Pro Era released their debut mixtape entitled The Secc$ Tap.e.

The release of the AmeriKKKan Korruption (Capital STEEZ) and 1999 (Joey Badass) mixtapes increased the group's popularity in the underground scene. 1999 was listed among "Best Mixtapes of 2012" by multiple publications. Capital STEEZ was on the list of "Rappers to Watch For in 2013", curated by the website HipHopDX.

Pro Era performed with The Smoker's Club's One Hazy Summer Tour, a 30-date tour that began July 13, 2012. In December of that year, Pro Era released the PEEP: The aPROcalypse mixtape. From October 27 to December 1, 2012, Joey Badass went on the first tour for any member of the collective, beginning in New York and ending in Virginia, with the tour also extending abroad to countries such as Switzerland, France, England, and the Netherlands.

On December 24, 2012, Capital STEEZ committed suicide, jumping from the rooftop of the Cinematic Music Group headquarters in Manhattan, New York City. Earlier that evening, he sent text messages to a few of his closest friends, telling them he loved them. At 11:59 PM on December 23, STEEZ posted a tweet saying, "The end." He jumped to his death later that night.

=== 2013–2014: Touring and mixtapes ===
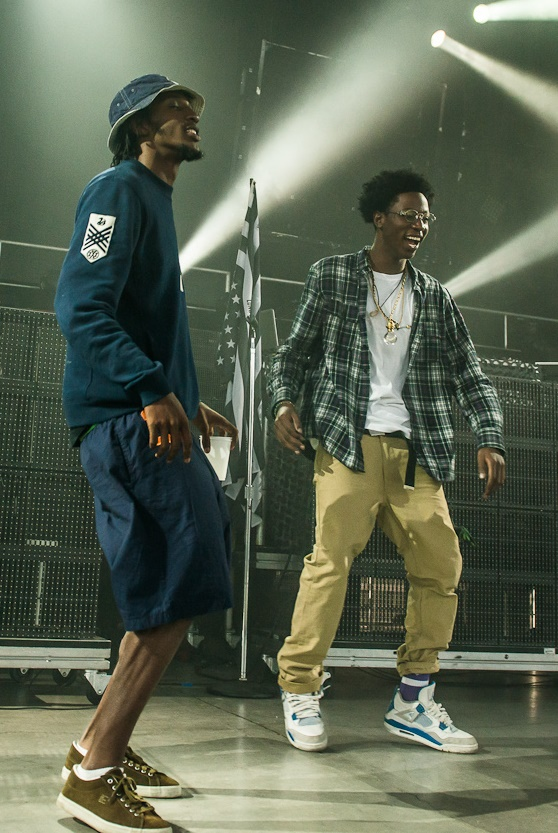
CJ Fly (left) and Joey Badass (right) at the Under the Influence Tour in Toronto, Canada on August 10, 2013.

On March 21, 2013, Pro Era participated in the Beast Coastal concert tour with The Underachievers and Flatbush Zombies. The Beast Coastal concert tour performed all over the United States. The first leg of the tour covered the West coast while the second leg covered the East and Midwest, before the tour ended on April 20. Pro Era began a tour of their own on August 29, 2013, at Fort Punta Christo Pula in Croatia and they performed at a variety of venues including New Zealand, Australia and the United States. The tour went on to December 14 and this was technically the first tour in which Pro Era as a group went on tour. Later that year, Pro Era toured with the Under the Influence 2013 tour with Wiz Khalifa, ASAP Rocky, Trinidad James, Chevy Woods and Smoke DZA, among others.

On October 5, 2013, CJ Fly released his debut mixtape, Thee Way Eye See It. On December 25, 2013, the group announced that their third mixtape, The Secc$ Tap.e 2, would be released on February 14, 2014. As promised, it would be released on that day, as a part of a free-music giveaway coined "Pro Era Week". Their next project, The Shift, a free EP was released on May 27, 2014, by Scion AV.

=== 2014–present: Solo projects and Beast Coast supergroup ===
Due to the coming release of his debut studio album, Joey Badass began a long world tour alongside Pro Era. The tour started on August 8, 2014, in Norway before they went on to tour the U.S. for weeks until reaching their Europe leg of the tour which began in England on November 18 making stops in countries like France, the Netherlands, Australia, Denmark, Belgium, Croatia, Switzerland, and Germany. Joey Badass and Pro Era decided to cut the tour short while in Australia due to the death of member, and cousin of Joey Badass, Junior B.

After Joey Badass' debut album was released, he stated in an interview that Kirk Knight, Nyck Caution, and CJ Fly will be releasing new music in 2015. He also announced an upcoming Pro Era album as well as a Capital STEEZ posthumous album. Pro Era producer and rapper Kirk Knight began his first tour with fellow Cinematic Music Group artist, Chicago rapper Mick Jenkins, without any other musical artists within Pro Era, on February 13, 2015, and will continue to February 27. They will tour the United States and make stops throughout the country. Joey Badass released his debut album, B4.DA.$$ on January 20, 2015. He went along to promote it on his "World Domination Tour". In June 2015, Powers Pleasant released his debut project, The Powers Pleasant Experience, while Kirk Knight also released his debut project, Late Knight Special, on October 30, 2015.

On February 2, 2016, Swankmaster RAW announced that he had left Pro Era. He wrote, "Respectively, want to let to whom it may concern know, I'm no longer a part of the Era. Many blessings to all my brothers." On February 3, 2016, Joey Badass reported on Twitter that another member, Dyemond Lewis, had an amicable split with the group. He wrote, "Dyemond Lewis is no longer a part of PROERA... That's my brother to the death but we had to come to this conclusion unfortunately." On February 29, 2016, Nyck Caution released his debut project, Disguise the Limit. On December 9, 2016, CJ Fly released his debut project, FlyTrap. On December 27, Nyck Caution announced the album Nyck @ Knight, a collaborative effort between himself and Kirk Knight, stating that they had already completed 4 songs. In June 2017, both Kirk Knight and Nyck Caution announced that the collaborative project was completed. It is scheduled to be released on July 21 of 2017. On the third annual STEEZ Day Festival, Joey Badass announced after Pro Era's performance that they are working on a group album as well as announcing that a posthumous album from Capital STEEZ, King Capital, was to be released on December 23, 2017, the 5th anniversary of his death. However, on December 11 (eleven days before King Capital was due for release), Joey Badass announced on his Instagram account that the album's release would be delayed until further notice due to "business legalities and sample clearances."

In 2019, the supergroup Beast Coast, consisting of members from Pro Era, as well as fellow Brooklyn-based hip hop groups Flatbush Zombies and The Underachievers, released three singles ahead of their debut album, Escape from New York, released on May 24, 2019. The group also announced a North American summer tour that began on July 23 and scheduled to end on August 16.

== 47 logo controversy ==
The "47" symbol associated with Pro Era

The design of one of Pro Era's logos is the number 47 with its digits joined.

It has sparked controversy due to its similarity to the Nazi flag. Like the Nazi flag, the logo has a red field with a solid white circle and a black insignia. Instead of a swastika, the circular white field of the sticker contains the 47 symbol, which bears close resemblance to the swastika and to a wolfsangel, both of which are associated with Nazism and Neo-Nazism. Stickers of the logo and graffiti of the symbol appeared in numerous locations around Edward R. Murrow High School and the Brooklyn neighborhood of Midwood (where the school is located) in March 2014, being planted by members of Pro Era to honor the memory of the late Capital STEEZ.

According to local news station News 12 Brooklyn, the group has explained that the logo was designed the way it was to draw attention, and that the symbol resembles peace, love and balance, as with the swastika's significance in various religions. They say that it is supposed to be a spiritual symbol and not an offensive one. Capital STEEZ believed that the logo's resemblance of a swastika is a commentary on the appropriation of what was originally a peaceful & spiritual symbol with roots in Eastern religions. STEEZ chose the number 47 due to the 7 chakra points, 4 being the point for the heart and 7 being the brain.

== Pro Era Records ==
Pro Era Records
- Parent company: Sony Music Entertainment
- Founded: 2015
- Founder: Pro Era
- Distributor: Columbia Records
- Genre: Hip hop
- Country of origin: United States
- Location: Brooklyn, New York
- Official website: theproera.com

Pro Era Records is an American independent record label founded by the group in 2015.

=== Artists ===
Current acts

- Aaron Rose
- Chuck Strangers
- CJ Fly
- Dessy Hinds
- Joey Badass
- Kirk Knight
- Nyck Caution
- Powers Pleasant

Former acts

- Capital STEEZ (deceased)
- Dirty Sanchez 47
- Dyemond Lewis
- JAB47
- Jakk Da Rhymer
- Rokamouth
- SwankMasterRAW
- T'nah Apex

== Discography ==
=== Collective discography ===
Albums

- Escape from New York (with Flatbush Zombies & The Underachievers as Beast Coast) (2019)

Mixtapes

- The Secc$ TaP.E. (2012)
- P.E.E.P: The aPROcalypse (2012)
- The Secc$ Ta.E. Vol. 2 (2014)

EPs

- The Shift (2014)

=== Individual discography ===
Aaron Rose discography

EPs

- Elixir (2016)

Albums

- Rozart (2019)

Capital STEEZ discography

Mixtapes

- The Yellow Tape (with Jakk the Rhymer as The 3rd Kind) (2009)
- AmeriKKKan Korruption (2012)

Albums

- King Capital (TBA)

Chuck Strangers discography

Albums

- Consumers Park (2018)
- A Forsaken Lover's Plea (2024)
- Affordable Luxuries (with Milc as Bad Tofu) (2024)
- Token of Appreciation (with Boldy James) (2025)

EPs

- Too Afraid to Dance (2020)
- The Boys & Girls (2023)

CJ Fly discography

Mixtapes

- Thee Way Eye See It (2013)

Albums

- Flytrap (2016)
- Rudebwoy (with Statik Selektah) (2020)
- Not What You're Expecting (2021)
- Healing From Our Wounds (2021)
- Piranha (with Stoic) (2023)

Instrumental albums

- The Way I H(ear) It, Vol. 1 (2021)

EPs

- The Pharaoh's Return (2022)
- Baited (with Stoic (2024)

Dessy Hinds discography

EPs

- Save As You Go (2020)
- 4REEL (XXX) (2024)
- The Heartbreak & Isolate Pack (2025)
- ...Vol. II: Heart Her & Isolate (2025)

Albums

- Hindsight LP (2026)

Dirty Sanchez discography

Albums

- New Yuck City (2018)

Mixtapes

- 4MM (with J.A.B.) (2017)
- Divine Time (with Nef) (2019)
- Don't Talk to Me (with Rokamouth) (2020)
- Sorry for the Troubles (with DJ J Hart) (2020)
- Genesis (with Nef) (2020)
- Magic City (with Wizard Lee) (2021)
- Godspeed (with DJ J Hart) (2022)

EPs

- Pull the Sours Out (2019)

Hans Solo discography

EPs

- On the Wheel (with Sincere) (2017)

Joey Badass discography

Mixtapes

- 1999 (2012)
- Rejex (2012)
- Summer Knights (2013)

Albums

- B4.DA.$$ (2015)
- ALL-AMERIKKKAN BADA$$ (2017)
- 2000 (2022)
- Lonely at the Top (2025)

EPs

- The Light Pack (2020)

Kirk Knight discography

Albums

- Late Knight Special (2015)
- Nyck @ Knight (with Nyck Caution) (2017)
- It Is What It Is (IIWII) (2018)
- After Dark (2021)

Instrumental albums

- Dust [2013] (2016)
- Black Noise (2016)

Nyck Caution discography

Mixtapes

- The Pursuit, Vol. 1 (2011)
- Disguise the Limit (2016)

EPs

- Little Nycky (2022)
- Nyckstape (2023)

Albums

- Nyck @ Knight (with Kirk Knight) (2017)
- Anywhere But Here (2021)
- Friend of the Family (with Charlie Heat) (2022)

Powers Pleasant discography

EPs

- The Powers Pleasant Experience (2015)

Albums

- Life Is Beautiful (2019)
