= Hitta J3 =

American rapper (born 1992)

- Born: Dominicke Williams; October 5, 1992 (age 33); Compton, California, U.S.
- Genres: Hip-hop
- Occupations: Rapper; singer; songwriter
- Instrument: Vocals
- Years active: 2016–present
- Labels: The Music Life Group Inc.; Hitmaker Music Group
- Member of: Meet the Whoops

Dominicke Williams (born October 5, 1992), better known by his stage name Hitta J3, is an American rapper and songwriter, best known in the West Coast hip hop scene for his authentic sound and raw storytelling, as well as his collaborations and remixes.

Born in Compton, California, he initially released his first single "Do Yo Gudda" featuring YG, Kendrick Lamar, and Problem. After its release he signed with The Music Life Group Inc., and shortly after he released his first album titled The Collect Call in 2016. Later in 2018 his album Case Closed was released with the single "Buss Down". Williams is a longtime friend of fellow rapper Kendrick Lamar, and they have collaborated on multiple occasions. He is also a member of the hip hop collective Meet the Whoops, who notably performed their eponymously titled debut song "Meet The Whoops", alongside Jay Worthy, for Lamar's concert The Pop Out: Ken & Friends at the Kia Forum in Inglewood, California, during the first set by DJ Hed, titled the Act I – DJ Hed & Friends on 19 June 2024. Later that year, he was featured on "GNX" the posse cut title track of Lamar's 2024 album GNX, and he is also known for appearing in the photograph that became the album cover of Lamar's Grammy Award-winning 2015 album To Pimp a Butterfly.

== Discography ==
=== Mixtapes ===
List of mixtapes, with selected chart positions and sales figures
Title	Album details	Peak chart positions		Sales
Title	Album details	US R&B/HH	US Heat.	Sales
The Collect Call	Released: 2016 (US); Label: The Music Life; Formats: CD, Digital Download	—	—	
Case Closed	Released: August 10, 2018 (US); Label: The Music Life; Formats: CD, Digital Download	—	—	
Freedom	Released: October 11, 2019 (US); Label: The Music Life; Formats: CD, Digital Download	—	—	
The Wake Up Call 2	Released: April 7, 2023 (US); Label: Hitmaker Music Group; Formats: CD, Digital Download	—	—	
Hittaman	Released: July 21, 2023 (US); Label: Hitta J3; Formats: CD, Digital Download	—	—	
"—" denotes a recording that did not chart or was not released in that territory.

=== Guest appearances ===
List of non-single guest appearances, with other performing artists, showing year released and album name
Title	Year	Other performer(s)	Album
"Support Compton"	2016	The Game, Peysoh	Streets of Compton
"GNX"	2024	Kendrick Lamar, YoungThreat, Peysoh	GNX
