= Chuck Strangers =

American rapper and producer (born 1992)

- Born: Che Jessamy; January 7, 1992 (age 34); Brooklyn, New York, U.S.
- Genres: Hip-hop
- Occupations: Rapper; producer
- Years active: 2012–present
- Label: Lex
- Member of: Pro Era; Bad Tofu

Che Jessamy (born January 7, 1992), known professionally as Chuck Strangers, is an American rapper and record producer who is a member of the Pro Era collective. He first began to gain prominence for his work on Joey Badass' debut mixtape 1999.

Strangers released his debut studio album Consumers Park in 2018. In 2024, he released his second solo album, A Forsaken Lover's Plea, which was met with positive reception.

== Discography ==
Albums

- Consumers Park (2018)
- A Forsaken Lover's Plea (2024)
- Affordable Luxuries (with Milc as Bad Tofu) (2024)
- Token of Appreciation (with Boldy James) (2025)
- Glory of the King's Hand (2026)

EPs

- Too Afraid to Dance (2020)
- The Boys & Girls (2023)
