= Meechy Darko =

American rapper from New York

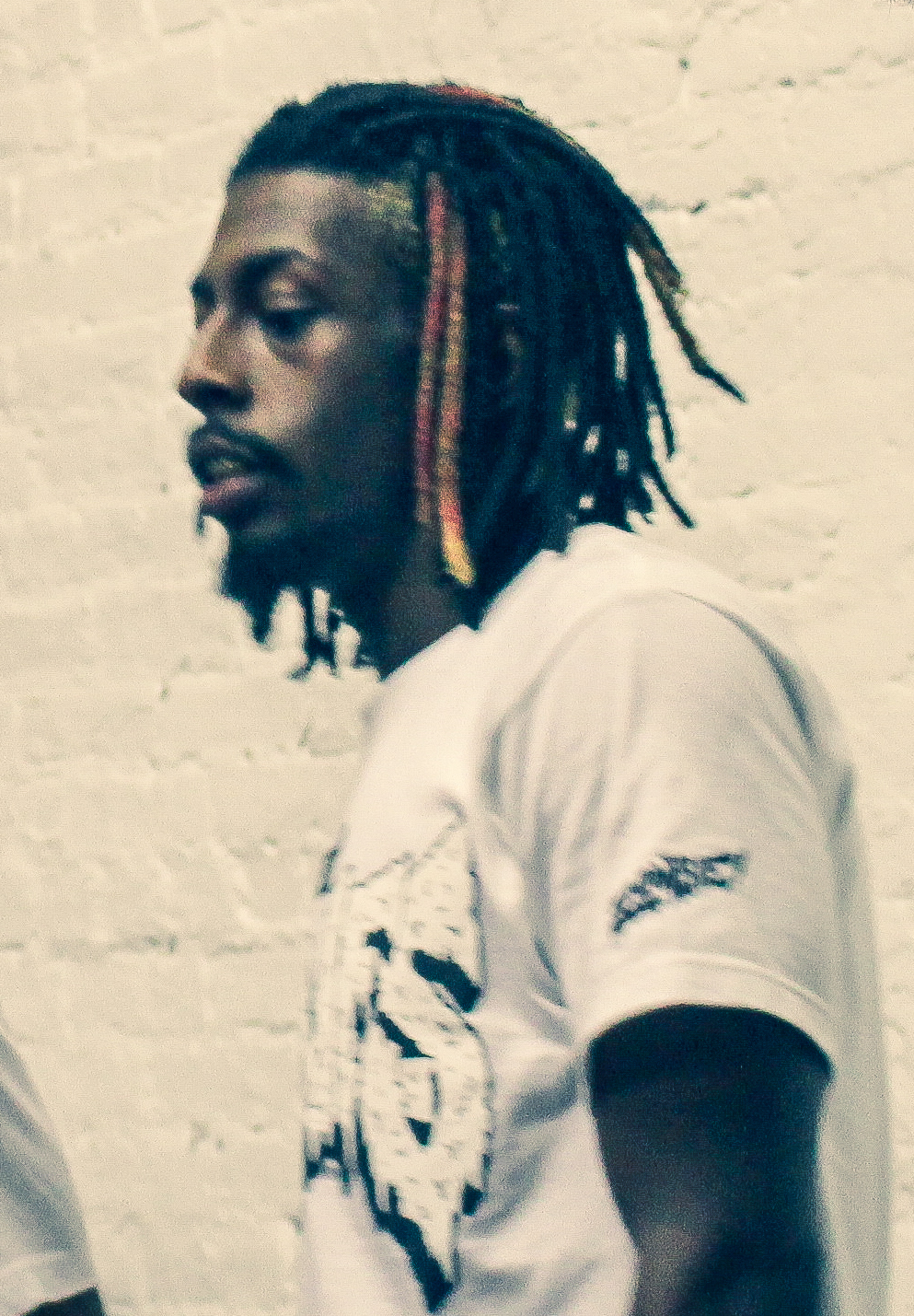
- Meechy Darko in 2014

Background information
- Born: Demetri O'Neal Simms; December 26, 1989 (age 36); Brooklyn, New York, U.S.
- Genre: Hip hop
- Occupations: Rapper; songwriter
- Years active: 2010–present
- Labels: The Glorious Dead; Loma Vista
- Member of: Flatbush Zombies; Beast Coast; 2 Dead Boyz
- Website: meechisdead.com

Demetri O'Neal Simms (born 26 December, 1989), better known by his stage name Meechy Darko, is an American rapper from Brooklyn, New York. He is best known as a member of the hip hop trio Flatbush Zombies, with whom he began his rapping career with his longtime friends, Erick Arc Elliott and Zombie Juice in 2010. In 2022, he released his debut solo album Gothic Luxury.

== Early life ==
Meechy Darko was born in Flatbush, Brooklyn, New York, to a Jamaican family. He grew up on the same block as his future bandmate Erick Arc Elliott, and attended Medgar Evers High School. Meech also was friends with the members of the rap group that would later be known as the Underachievers. They bonded while using LSD and psilocybin mushrooms. During one of these experiences with shrooms, Meech felt that he had experienced ego death.

== Career ==
Meech, Juice, and Erick went on to form Flatbush Zombies in 2010. In January 2012, they released a music video for their song "Thug Waffle". The video received many views and caught attention of fans and other rappers. They released multiple other rap videos for their first mixtape "D.R.U.G.S", which was released in July 2012. The group then released their second mixtape "BetterOffDEAD" on September 11, 2013, at 9:11 PM. "BetterOffDEAD" went on to receive positive reviews from critics. In 2014, Meech announced that every Friday they would put out a new song for multiple weeks. In 2015, Meech announced that Flatbush Zombies were working on their debut album. In October 2015, they were invited to perform at Jay Z's Tidal concert. In January 2016, they were invited to "Yams Day", a concert that was dedicated to deceased ASAP Mob member A$AP Yams. In the same month, Flatbush Zombies released "Glorious Thugs" to SoundCloud, and also announced that their debut album "3001: A Laced Odyssey" was to be released on March 11, 2016. They also planned a tour to go along with the album. On March 11, the album was released, and sold 28,000 copies in its first week, debuting at #10 on the Billboard Album Sales Charts. Their latest album, "Vacation In Hell", was released on April 6, 2018, and they have continued to work independently under Glorious Dead Recordings. They also created an album in 2019 with hip hop collective Beast Coast called "Escape From New York".

On August 26, 2022, Meech released his debut solo album, "Gothic Luxury", on Loma Vista Recordings. The album contains features from Denzel Curry, Busta Rhymes, and Freddie Gibbs, amongst others.

== Discography ==
=== Studio albums ===
Title	Album details	Peak chart positions										Certifications
Title	Album details	US	US R&B	US Rap	AUS	CAN	FRA	GER	NZ	SWI	UK	Certifications
Gothic Luxury	Released: August 26, 2022; Label: Loma Vista; Formats: CD, cassette, digital download	—	—	—	—	—	—	—	—	—	—	
Doses	Released: October 20, 2023; Label: Loma Vista; Formats: cassette, VHS, digital download	—	—	—	—	—	—	—	—	—	—	
"—" denotes a recording that did not chart or was not released in that territory.

=== Collaborative albums ===
List of studio albums, with selected chart positions, sales figures and certifications
Title	Album details	Peak chart positions										Certifications
Title	Album details	US	US R&B	US Rap	AUS	CAN	FRA	GER	NZ	SWI	UK	Certifications
3001: A Laced Odyssey	Released: March 11, 2016; Label: The Glorious Dead; Formats: CD, digital download, Vinyl	10	2	2	39	13	179	72	27	29	105	
Vacation in Hell	Released: April 6, 2018; Label: The Glorious Dead; Formats: CD, digital download	11	9	8	59	13	—	—	33	44	—	
"—" denotes a recording that did not chart or was not released in that territory.

=== EPs ===
List of extended plays, with selected details
Title	Album details
Clockwork Indigo (as Clockwork Indigo, with The Underachievers)	Released: 2014; Label: Self-released; Formats: Digital download
Now, More Than Ever	Released: June 5, 2020; Label: The Glorious Dead; Formats: Digital download CD | Cassette | Vinyl Record

=== Mixtapes ===
List of mixtapes, with year released
Title	Album details
D.R.U.G.S.	Released: July 24, 2012; Label: Self-released; Format: Digital download
BetterOffDEAD	Released: September 11, 2013; Label: Self-released; Format: Digital download

=== Singles ===
List of singles as featured performer, with selected chart positions, showing year released and album name
Title	Year	Peak chart positions			Album
Title	Year	US	US R&B	US Rap	Album
"Bounce"	2016	—	—	—	3001: A Laced Odyssey
"This Is It"	2016	—	—	—	3001: A Laced Odyssey
"Gotta"	2016				
"—" denotes a title that did not chart, or was not released in that territory.

=== Guest appearances ===
List of non-single guest appearances, with other performing artists, showing year released and album name
Title	Year	Other artist(s)	Album
"Bath Salts"	2012	ASAP Rocky, ASAP Ant	Lords Never Worry
"Thrilla"	2012	Bodega Bamz	Strictly 4 My P.A.P.I.Z.
"Just Blowin' In the Wind"	2012	RZA	The Man with the Iron Fists
"Mini Van Dan (Remix)"	2012	A$ton Matthews, ASAP Nast, Danny Brown	Versace Ragz
"Piss Test (Remix)"	2012	A-Trak, Jim Jones, El-P, Flosstradamus	Fool's Gold Presents: Loosies
"36 Chamber Flow"	2012	—N/a	Fool's Gold Presents: Loosies
"Mood Swings"	2013	Overdoz, Worlds Fair	—N/a
"No Religion"	2013	The Underachievers	—N/a
"New Brooklyn"	2013	Dyme-A-Duzin, The Underachievers	The New York Renaissance
"Inf Beams"	2013	—N/a	The New York Renaissance
"Tomorrow's Gone"	2013	Mr. Muthafuckin eXquire, Nacho Picasso, Danny Brown	Kismet
"Camouflage Dons"	2013	Statik Selektah, Smif-n-Wessun	Extended Play
"My Jeep"	2013	Joey Badass, The Underachievers	Summer Knights EP
"TLC"	2014	A$ton Matthews, Action Bronson	Aston 3:16
"Piñata"	2014	Freddie Gibbs, Madlib, Domo Genesis, G-Wiz, Casey Veggies, Sulaiman, Mac Miller	Piñata
"Believe in the Shied"	2014	Smoke DZA	Ringside 2
"97.92"	2014	Trash Talk	CONS EP VOL. 1
"Modern Mayhem"	2014	Trash Talk	CONS EP VOL. 2
"Bring Em Out"	2015	Bodega Bamz	Sidewalk Exec
"Good Knight"	2015	Kirk Knight, Joey Badass, Dizzy Wright	Late Knight Special
"Ring the Alarm"	2017	Joey Badass, Nyck Caution, Kirk Knight	All-AmeriKKKan Badass
"A Glorious Death"	2017	A$AP Twelvyy	12
"What Happens"	2017	A$AP MOB, Joey Badass, Kirk Knight, Nyck Caution, Playboi Carti	Cozy Tapes Vol. 2: Too Cozy
"Superstar"	2019	Bun B, Statik Selektah, CJ Fly, Haile Supreme	TrillStatik
