= Zombie Juice =

American rapper (born 1990)

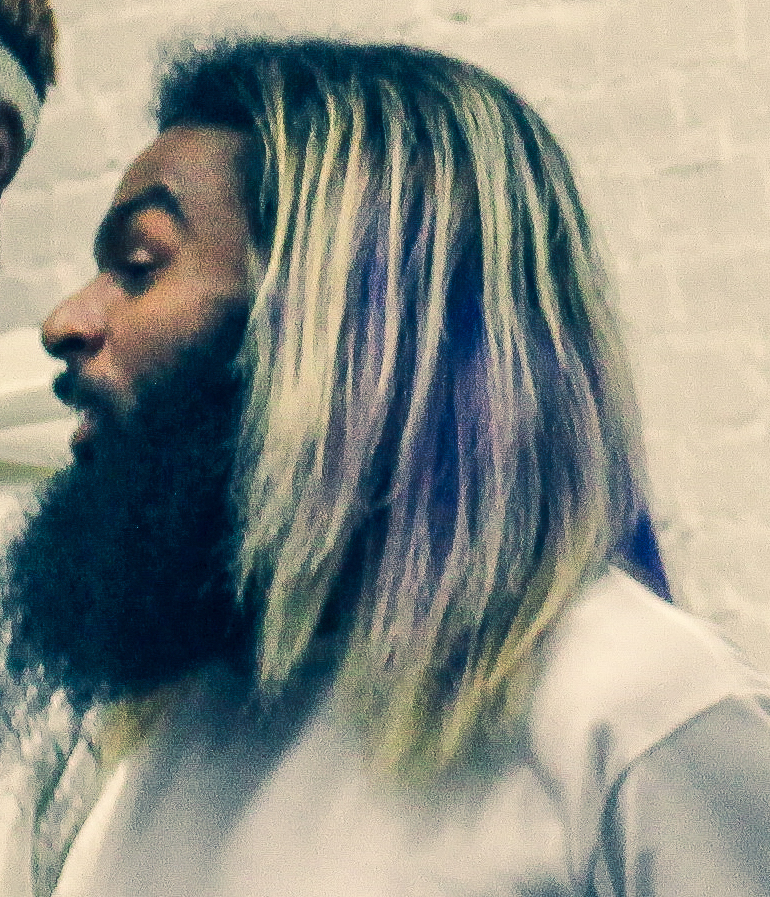
- Zombie Juice in 2014

Background information
- Also known as: Jewice; Issac Blaze
- Born: Antonio Lewis; July 8, 1990 (age 36)
- Origin: Brooklyn, New York City, U.S.
- Genres: Hip hop; East Coast hip hop; psychedelic rap
- Occupations: Rapper; songwriter
- Years active: 2010–present
- Label: The Glorious Dead
- Member of: Flatbush Zombies; Beast Coast; 2 Dead Boyz
- Website: thegloriousdead.com

Antonio Lewis (born July 8, 1990), better known by his stage name Zombie Juice, is an American rapper from Brooklyn, New York. He attended Midwood High School in Brooklyn. He is one third of the hip hop trio Flatbush Zombies. Along with his rapping career, Lewis also directed a music video for the Flatbush Zombies song "Thugnificense".

== Discography ==
=== Studio albums ===
List of studio albums, with selected chart positions, sales figures and certifications
Title	Album details	Peak chart positions										Certifications
Title	Album details	US	US R&B	US Rap	AUS	CAN	FRA	GER	NZ	SWI	UK	Certifications
3001: A Laced Odyssey	Released: March 11, 2016; Label: The Glorious Dead; Formats: CD, digital download	10	2	2	39	13	179	72	27	29	105	
Vacation in Hell	Released: April 6, 2018; Label: The Glorious Dead; Formats: CD, digital download	11	9	8	59	13	—	—	33	44	—	
"—" denotes a recording that did not chart or was not released in that territory.

=== EP ===
Extended play, with selected details
Title	Album details
Clockwork Indigo (as Clockwork Indigo, with The Underachievers)	Released: 2014; Label: Self-released; Formats: Digital download

=== Mixtapes ===
List of mixtapes, with year released
Title	Album details
D.R.U.G.S.	Released: July 24, 2012; Label: Self-released; Format: Digital download
BetterOffDead	Released: September 11, 2013; Label: Self-released; Format: Digital download

=== Singles ===
List of singles as featured performer, showing year released and album name
Title	Year	Album
"Bounce"	2016	3001: A Laced Odyssey
"This Is It"	2016	3001: A Laced Odyssey
"Headstone"	2018	Vacation in Hell

=== Guest appearances ===
List of non-single guest appearances, with other performing artists, showing year released and album name
Title	Year	Other artist(s)	Album
"Bath Salts"	2012	ASAP Rocky, ASAP Ant	Lords Never Worry
"Thrilla"	2012	Bodega Bamz	Strictly 4 My P.A.P.I.Z.
"Just Blowin' In the Wind"	2012	RZA	The Man with the Iron Fists
"Mini Van Dan (Remix)"	2012	Aston Matthews, ASAP Nast, Danny Brown	Versace Ragz
"Piss Test (Remix)"	2012	A-Trak, Jim Jones, El-P, Flosstradamus	Fool's Gold Presents: Loosies
"36 Chamber Flow"	2012	—N/a	Fool's Gold Presents: Loosies
"Mood Swings"	2013	Overdoz, Worlds Fair	—N/a
"No Religion"	2013	The Underachievers	—N/a
"New Brooklyn"	2013	Dyme-A-Duzin, The Underachievers	The New York Renaissance
"Inf Beams"	2013	—N/a	The New York Renaissance
"Tomorrow's Gone"	2013	Mr. Muthafuckin eXquire, Nacho Picasso, Danny Brown	Kismet
"Camouflage Dons"	2013	Statik Selektah, Smif-n-Wessun	Extended Play
"My Jeep"	2013	Joey Badass, The Underachievers	Summer Knights EP
"TLC"	2014	Aston Matthews, Action Bronson	Aston 3:16
"Believe in the Shied"	2014	Smoke DZA	Ringside 2
"97.92"	2014	Trash Talk	CONS EP VOL. 1
"Modern Mayhem"	2014	Trash Talk	CONS EP VOL. 2
"Bring Em Out"	2015	Bodega Bamz	Sidewalk Exec
"Good Knight"	2015	Kirk Knight, Joey Badass, Dizzy Wright	Late Knight Special
