= Now, More Than Ever (Flatbush Zombies EP) =

EP by Flatbush Zombies
- Released: June 5, 2020
- Length: 20:05
- Label: Glorious Dead Recordings

Flatbush Zombies chronology
Vacation in Hell (2018)	Now, More Than Ever (2020)

Now, More Than Ever (stylized as now, more than ever) is an EP by American hip hop group Flatbush Zombies. It was released on June 5, 2020, under the Glorious Dead label.

== Chart performance ==
Now, More Than Ever debuted at number 168 on the US Billboard 200 chart.

== Track listing ==
Now, More Than Ever track listing
No.	Title	Writer(s)	Length
1.	"herb"	Erick Arc Elliott; Meechy Darko; Zombie Juice	3:34
2.	"iamlegend"	Linden Jay; Laura Roy; Geordan Reid Campbell; E. Elliot; M. Darko; Z. Juice	2:50
3.	"quicksand"	M. Darko	3:01
4.	"dirty elevator music"	E. Elliot; M. Darko	3:31
5.	"blessings"	Z. Juice; E. Elliot; A.Chaverri	2:35
6.	"when i'm gone" (featuring Sophie Faith)	E. Elliot	4:34

== Charts ==
Chart performance for Now, More Than Ever
Chart (2020)	Peak position
US Billboard 200	168
US Top Album Sales (Billboard)	13
US Independent Albums (Billboard)	21
