= Evermore (disambiguation) =

Evermore is a 2020 studio album released by American singer-songwriter Taylor Swift.

Evermore may also refer to:

== Literature ==
- Evermore (anthology), an anthology of short stories about or in honor of Edgar Allan Poe
- Evermore (novel), a 2009 novel in The Immortals series by Alyson Noël
- Evermore, a short story by Julian Barnes in his 1996 collection Cross Channel

== Music ==
- Evermore (band), a New Zealand pop-rock band

=== Albums ===
- Evermore (Evermore album), a greatest hits album from Evermore.
- Evermore, a 2005 album by Planetshakers.
- Evermore: The Art of Duality, a studio album by American hip hop duo The Underachievers.

=== Songs ===
- "Evermore" (song), a song from the 2017 film Beauty and the Beast
- "Evermore", a song by Edenbridge from The Grand Design
- "Evermore", a song by the American indie rock band Grandaddy from Last Place
- "Evermore", a song by Hillsong Church from the live album, For All You've Done
- "Evermore" by Taylor Swift featuring Bon Iver, from Evermore
- "Evermore", a song by W.A.S.P. from Unholy Terror

== Other ==
- Evermore Park, a defunct amusement park in Pleasant Grove, Utah, United States
- J. D. Evermore, an American actor

== See also ==
- Nevermore (disambiguation)
