= The Lords of Flatbush (The Underachievers album) =

Mixtape by the Underachievers
- Released: August 29, 2013
- Recorded: 2013
- Genre: Hip-hop
- Length: 23:18
- Labels: Elevated Nations; RPM MSC; Brainfeeder
- Producers: Lex Luger; Eff Dope; Erick Arc Elliott

The Underachievers chronology
Indigoism (2013)	The Lords of Flatbush (2013)	Cellar Door: Terminus ut Exordium (2014)

The Lords of Flatbush is the second mixtape by American hip-hop duo the Underachievers. It was released on August 29, 2013, by Elevated Nations and Brainfeeder, it was distributed by RPM MSC. The mixtape features production by Lex Luger, Eff Dope and Erick Arc Elliott.

== Title ==
The Underachievers pay homage to a Brooklyn 1974 film of the same name about the coming of age of four young men in 1958. The EP grabs influence from the movie, known for its racy scenes about stealing cars and bar fights, capturing a similar relentless, youthful energy.

== Track listing ==
No.	Title	Producer(s)	Length
1.	"Leaving Scraps"	Lex Luger	2:11
2.	"Flexing"	Lex Luger	3:01
3.	"Cold Crush"	Lex Luger	3:16
4.	"Still Shining"	Lex Luger	3:15
5.	"Fake Fans"	Lex Luger	3:08
6.	"Melody of the Free"	Lex Luger	2:29
7.	"Ain’t S**t (Midnight Augusto)"	Eff Dope	3:27
8.	"N.A.S.A"	Erick Arc Elliott	2:31
Total length:			23:18
