= Indigoism =

Mixtape by the Underachievers
- Released: February 1, 2013
- Recorded: 2012–2013
- Genres: Hip-hop; psychedelic hip-hop
- Length: 57:54
- Label: Brainfeeder
- Producers: Mr. Bristol; Rich Flyer; The Entreproducers; Bruce LeeKix; Dreamrite; Lou Chapo; Blacktophero; Eff Dope; Roca Beats; Taleil Brown; Marcasso

The Underachievers chronology
Indigoism (2013)	Lords of Flatbush (2013)

Indigoism is the debut mixtape by American hip-hop duo the Underachievers, released on February 1, 2013 as a free digital download via Brainfeeder. The mixtape was produced by Mr Bristol, Rich Flyer, The Entreproducers, Bruce LeeKix, Dreamrite and Lou Chapo, among others. Upon its release, it was met with universal acclaim by music critics.

== Background ==
In May 2012, The Underachievers released their first music video for the song "So Devilish". Following the video's release they began gaining attention quickly, with the second song from the mixtape "Gold Soul Theory" getting played on BBC Radio in August 2012. The third song and music video from Indigoism was "Herb Shuttles", which had gotten over four million views on YouTube. On February 1, 2013, the duo released their first official mixtape, Indigoism via Flying Lotus' Brainfeeder record label. Indigoism featured psychedelic lyrics, allusions to the third eye and spirituality. The mixtape was produced by Mr Bristol, Rich Flyer, The Entreproducers, Bruce Lee Kixxs, Dreamrite and Lou Chapo, among others.

== Promotion ==
Following the release of Indigoism, The Underachievers toured North America and Australia with Joey Badass, Pro Era and Flatbush Zombies from March 21 until April 20, 2013. On July 19, 2013, Indigoism was released to iTunes for retail sale.

== Critical response ==
Professional ratings
Review scores
Source	Rating
BBC	(positive)
HipHopDX	(positive)
Pitchfork	8.0/10
Stereogum	(positive)

Upon its release, Indigoism was met with universal acclaim from music critics. Mike Diver of BBC said, "Yet while The Underachievers' reach is impressive, their inspirational roots are close to home. This rap is resolutely a product of its environment, as much as any PDO-covered speciality. You can taste the concrete, the glass, the history. If the Beast Coast movement has passed you by ‘til now, The Underachievers set it front and centre in their lyrical landscape, frequent references positioning it as a not-so-underground happening impossible to ignore. Especially when the music its ethos is set to comes as fully formed as Indigoism. One wonders how its makers can step their game up significantly for a debut set proper. [...] Indigoism is worth more than just blazing to. It deserves to, and should, blaze a path for its makers, from DatPiff to the dark side of the moon." Pitchfork gave the mixtape an eight out of ten saying, "While many of their contemporaries subscribe to a school of rap that extols the joys of drug use, gleefully cataloguing chemicals consumed, the Underachievers' Issa Dash and AK treat mind-altering substances like sacraments, like battering rams at the doors of perception. Their debut mixtape, Indigoism, is druggy, but aesthetically so; beneath the surface lies a work of art-damaged mysticism and pyrotechnic wordplay." Jesse Fairfax of HipHopDX stated, "Indigoism is a refreshing first effort for Issa Dash & Ak whose themes of consciousness and psychedelics boost their creativity in developing something vaguely familiar while not exactly derivative, a rarity in this day and age. Despite a slight amount of filler and the topics suffering a lack of diversity, The Underachievers have covered their bases well enough to attain fandom from purists and adolescents alike." Being praised as their "mixtape of the week", Tom Breihan of Stereogum said, "As rappers, they’re technical marvels who still come off like scabby young punks. They don’t project much in the way of starpower, and I almost certainly wouldn't recognize either one on the street, but they haven’t let that stop them from making exciting music."

Closing out the year, Indigoism was named to multiple "best albums of the year" lists. Complex ranked it at number 43 on their list of the 50 best albums of 2013. They commented saying, "For the better part of Indigoism, The Underachievers explore themes of spirituality told through a prism of psychedelic drugs. Songs like "6th Sense" and "Gold Soul Theory" delve into the group's daily practice of opening up their "third eye," which in turn allows them to creep into creative spaces they wouldn't otherwise be able to access. Sounds a little hippie-dippy, sure, but they pull it off with aplomb. But just listen to "T.A.D.E.D." or "My Prism"—high-level seminars on self-knowledge." Spin positioned it at number 34 on their list of the 40 best hip-hop albums of the year. They elaborated saying, "As self-described young pharaohs smoking "Herb Shuttles" and popping tabs of LSD that crack open their third eye like Hieroglyphics, the Underachievers exemplify pure poverty, and convey the excitement of young black men learning knowledge of self. There's the customary nod to New York hip-hop's upgraded status ("New New York"), but the Underachievers sound like they're in their own lane, trends be damned." PrettyMuchAmazing named it the eighth best mixtape of 2013.

== Track listing ==
No.	Title	Producer(s)	Length
1.	"Philanthropist"	Blacktophero	2:37
2.	"Revelations"	Lou the Human	3:52
3.	"So Devilish"	Dreamrite	3:30
4.	"Sun Through the Rain"	Eff Dope	3:14
5.	"Maxing Out"	Rich Flyer	3:24
6.	"Herb Shuttles"	Roca Beats	3:15
7.	"T.A.D.E.D."	Mr. Bristol	3:22
8.	"New New York"	The Entreproducers	2:49
9.	"Land Of Lords"	Taleil Brown	3:44
10.	"6th Sense"	The Entreproducers	3:05
11.	"My Prism"	Rich Flyer	2:47
12.	"Gold Soul Theory"	Rich Flyer	3:03
13.	"Potion Number 25"	Bruce LeeKix	3:37
14.	"The Mahdi"	Marcasso	3:19
15.	"Leopard Shepard"	Dreamrite	4:18
16.	"Root of all Evil"	Mr. Bristol	3:19
17.	"Play Your Part"	Mr. Bristol	4:23
Total length:			57:54
