= Renaissance (The Underachievers album) =

Studio album by the Underachievers
- Released: May 19, 2017
- Genre: East Coast hip-hop
- Length: 47:50
- Label: RPM MSC
- Producers: René McLean (exec.); Issa Gold (exec.); AK The Savior (exec.); 24o1; Iiidhw; Joshua Heflinger; Mayor; Powers Pleasant; Ronny J; Roper Williams; Tedd Boyd

The Underachievers chronology
Evermore: The Art of Duality (2015)	Renaissance (2017)	After the Rain (2018)

Singles from Renaissance
- 1. "Gotham Nights" Released: February 1, 2017; 2. "Cobra Clutch" Released: February 8, 2017; 3. "Final Destination" Released: March 17, 2017; 4. "Head Right" Released: March 28, 2017

Renaissance is the third studio album by American hip-hop duo the Underachievers. It was released on May 19, 2017 by RPM MSC. The album features two guest appearance from Mello. The album artwork was created by Pencil Fingerz.

== Singles ==
The album's lead single, titled "Gotham Nights" was released on Feb 1, 2017. The song was produced by Joshua Heflinger.

The album's second single, titled "Cobra Clutch" was released on February 8, 2017. The song was produced by Tedd Boyd.

The album's third single, titled "Final Destination" was released on March 17, 2017. The song was produced by Powers Pleasant.

The album's fourth single, titled "Head Right" was released on March 28, 2017. The song was produced by Ronny J.

== Track listing ==
No.	Title	Writer(s)	Producer(s)	Length
1.	"In My Zone"	Mayor; Marlon Fung; Akeem Joseph	Mayor	3:21
2.	"Eyes Wide Open"	Tedd Boyd; Fung; Joseph	Tedd Boyd	3:35
3.	"Saint Paul" (featuring Mello)	Ashanti Taylor; Joseph; Fung	Iiidhw	2:27
4.	"Gotham Nights"	Joshua Heflinger; Fung; Joseph	Joshua Heflinger	3:32
5.	"Cresendo"	Ronald Spence, Jr.; Fung; Joseph	Ronny J	2:39
6.	"Super Potent"	Tedd Boyd; Fung; Joseph	Tedd Boyd	3:04
7.	"How We Roll"	Roper Williams; Fung; Joseph	Roper Williams	3:39
8.	"Kiss The Sky"	Ashanti Taylor; Joseph; Fung	Iiidhw	3:29
9.	"Phoenix Feathers"	24o1; M. Fung; A. Joseph	24o1	2:45
10.	"Any Day"	Spence, Jr.; Fung; Joseph	Ronny J	2:42
11.	"Different Worlds"	Ashanti Taylor; Joseph; Fung	Iiidhw	2:59
12.	"Break the System" (featuring Mello)	Tedd Boyd; Joseph; Fung	Tedd Boyd	3:47
13.	"Cobra Clutch"	Tedd Boyd; Fung; Joseph	Tedd Boyd	3:06
14.	"Final Destination"	Powers Pleasant; Fung; Joseph	Powers Pleasant	3:37
15.	"Head Right"	Spence, Jr.; Fung; Joseph	Ronny J	3:19
Total length:				47:50

== Charts ==
Chart (2017)	Peak position
US Independent Albums (Billboard)	34
