= Nevermore (disambiguation) =

Nevermore is an American heavy metal band from Seattle, Washington, United States.

Nevermore may also refer to:

== Literature ==
- "Nevermore", famous line from "The Raven", a poem by Edgar Allan Poe ("Quoth the Raven, 'Nevermore.'")
- Nevermore, a science fiction graphic novel by Dean Koontz
- Nevermore (novel), a novel by William Hjortsberg
- Nevermore: The Final Maximum Ride Adventure by James Patterson
- The Nevermoor series, a fantasy book series by Jessica Townsend

== Film and television ==
- Nevermore (1962 film), a 1962 Soviet film starring Yevgeny Yevstigneyev
- Nevermore (2006 film), a 2006 German film starring Leonard Proxauf
- Nevermore (2007 film), a 2007 film starring Vincent Spano
- Nevermore, a 2018 short starring Edward W. Hardy
- Nevermore Academy, fictional school from the 2022 TV series Wednesday

== Music ==
=== Albums ===
- Nevermore (Nevermore album), 1995
- Nevermore (Mylène Farmer album), 2024 live album

=== Songs ===
- "Nevermore", a song by Queen from the album Queen II
- "Nevermore", a song by the Soundtrack of Our Lives from the album Behind the Music
- "Nevermore", a song by U.K. from the album U.K.
- "Nevermore", a song by Lamb of God from the album Omens
- "Never More", a song by Shoji Meguro for the game Persona 4

=== Other ===
- "Nevermore", a solo violin piece by Edward W. Hardy
- Nevermore 2023/2024, concert tour by Mylène Farmer
- "Nevermore" (audio drama), a 2010 Doctor Who audio play

== Other uses ==
- Nevermore (Gauguin), painting by Paul Gauguin
- Nevermore: The Imaginary Life and Mysterious Death of Edgar Allan Poe, a musical based on the life of Edgar Allan Poe

== See also ==
- Evermore (disambiguation)
- Forever More (disambiguation)
