= Flatbush Zombies =

American hip hop group

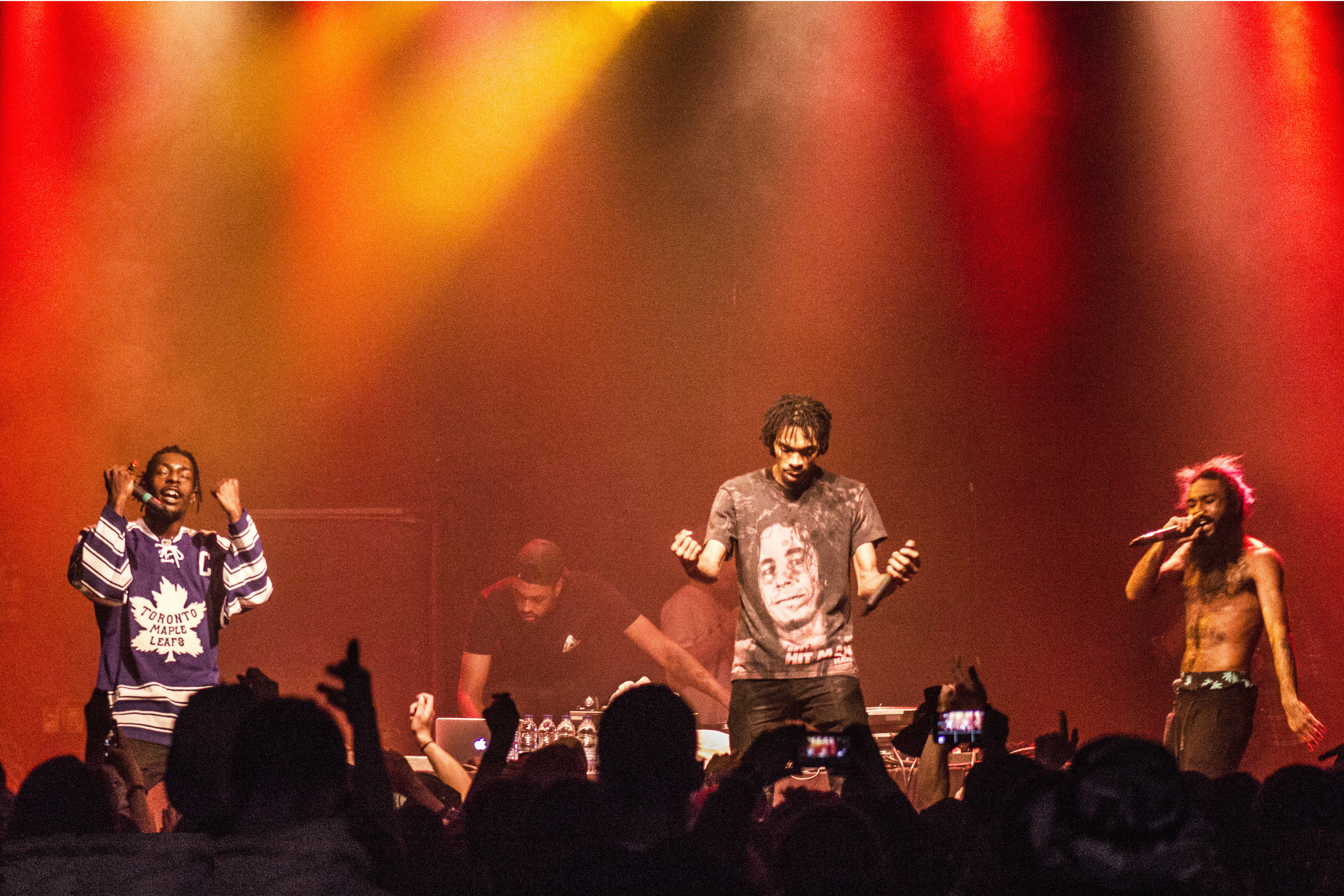
- The Flatbush Zombies performing in 2014.

Background information
- Origin: Brooklyn, New York City, U.S.
- Genres: East Coast hip hop; psychedelic rap; alternative hip hop
- Years active: 2010–present
- Labels: ADA; ElectricKoolAde; The Glorious Dead
- Spinoffs: Beast Coast; 2 Dead Boyz
- Members: Meechy Darko; Zombie Juice; Erick Arc Elliott
- Website: thegloriousdead.com

Flatbush Zombies (stylized as Flatbush ZOMBiES) are an American hip hop group from the Flatbush section of Brooklyn, New York City, formed in 2010. The group is composed of rappers Meechy Darko, Zombie Juice and Erick Arc Elliott, with Elliott also serving as their regular record producer. The trio are part of the East Coast hip hop supergroup Beast Coast, with fellow Brooklyn-based rap groups The Underachievers and Pro Era.

Flatbush Zombies have collaborated with various artists, including RZA, ASAP Mob, Z-Breezy, Jim Jones, Juicy J, Danny Brown, Action Bronson, Mr. Muthafuckin eXquire, Tech N9ne, and Anthony Flammia among others. They have performed at music festivals such as The Hudson Project, JMBLYA, Coachella Valley Music and Arts Festival, Pemberton Music Festival, Afropunk Festival, Olly Mac Sesh, Paid Dues, North Coast Music Festival, SXSW, Roskilde, Rolling Loud in Miami, and Wireless in London. The group grew in popularity through two mixtapes and several music videos, leading to their 2016 debut studio album, 3001: A Laced Odyssey.

== History ==
=== Background and formation ===
Friends since grade school, all three members were born and raised in the Flatbush section of Brooklyn, New York City. Erick and Meechy Darko are of Jamaican descent and Zombie Juice is of Trinidadian descent. Demetri Simms (Meechy Darko), Antonio Lewis (Zombie Juice) and Erick Elliott (The Architect) first bonded over the Japanese anime Dragon Ball Z and Professional wrestling. During their teenage years they began experimenting with psychedelic drugs, such as psilocybin mushrooms and LSD. Zombie Juice, along with fellow Flatbush native Issa Gold of the Underachievers (Erick did not participate), specifically started looking into the indigo lifestyle. Meechy Darko said the first time he took psilocybin mushrooms, he underwent Ego death and had a sort of rebirth of consciousness.

=== Mixtapes and rise in popularity (2010–2013) ===
Erick Arc Elliott, who had been making his own solo music, decided to bring the group together musically around 2010. Their first club performance took place in 2012, at 307 in Waterloo. The group's popularity grew after releasing the "Thug Waffle" video on YouTube. Later in the year, Flatbush Zombies released their debut mixtape, titled D.R.U.G.S., which stands for "Death and Reincarnation Under God's Supervision." In 2012, Flatbush Zombies were featured on the song "Just Blowin' in the Wind" with Wu Tang Clan's RZA for the soundtrack to RZA's film The Man with the Iron Fists. "

In 2013, the group collaborated with fellow Brooklyn rap group the Underachievers, on the single "No Religion".

On July 29, 2013, Flatbush Zombies released a YouTube video announcing their second mixtape, BetterOffDEAD, which was released at 9:11 PM on September 11, 2013. Along with "MRAZ," the singles "Palm Trees" and "222", are included on the nineteen track mixtape BetterOffDEAD. Though Elliott is the main producer, Harry Fraud and Obey City also provide production on the mixtape. Danny Brown and Action Bronson appear on the tracks "Drug Parade" and "Club Soda" respectively. The mixtape was met with critical acclaim. It would end up being ranked at number 17 on XXL's list of the best mixtapes of 2013. A remixed version of My Team Supreme featuring Bodega Bamz was featured in NBA Live 15. Flatbush Zombies also released the video for "MRAZ", a track off the group's mixtape BetterOffDEAD.

=== Clockwork Indigo and 3001: A Laced Odyssey (2014–2018) ===
On February 13, 2014, Flatbush Zombies released a new song, "LiT". Flatbush Zombies revealed to XXL that their EP, It's All a Matter of Perspective, had been scrapped. Instead the group told XXL to "expect an album this year."

In September 2014, it was announced that Flatbush Zombies would be touring with fellow Brooklyn-based rap group the Underachievers, and they would be collectively known as Clockwork Indigo. The two groups subsequently released a collaborative song titled "Butterfly Effect," followed by an EP titled Clockwork Indigo, on October 17, 2014. They claim that they came up with the idea of forming Clockwork Indigo, from a "strange LSD trip while watching A Clockwork Orange". During the Clockwork Indigo concert tour, the group collectively wore white clothing as did Alex's gang in the film A Clockwork Orange.

On March 15, 2015, Flatbush Zombies released a new single on SoundCloud titled "Red Eye to Paris" featuring UK Grime artist Skepta. On September 11, 2015, at 9:11 pm EST, the group released a new single and socially charged music video on YouTube titled "Blacktivist".

On January 11, 2016, the group released the single "Glorious Thugs". On the same day, the group announced that their debut album titled 3001: A Laced Odyssey, would be released March 11, 2016. On February 5, 2016, they released the first single from 3001: A Laced Odyssey titled "Bounce", followed by the official music video on February 8. On March 10, 2016, Flatbush Zombies released the second single from the album, titled "This Is It". The following day, they released the album. 3001: A Laced Odyssey received generally positive reviews from critics. At Metacritic, which assigns a normalized rating out of 100 to reviews from critics, the album received an average score of 80, based on 7 reviews. The album sold 28,000 copies in the first week, debuting at number 10 on the US Billboard 200 chart.

=== Vacation in Hell (2018–present) ===
On February 23, 2018, Flatbush Zombies released the first single off of their second studio album, Vacation in Hell. The project was released on April 6, 2018, under Glorious Dead Recordings. The album spawned a worldwide tour, See You In Hell Tour, that started off on April 14 at the 2018 Coachella Music Festival and ended on June 16. In promotion for the album, the trio appeared on the nationally syndicated talk show The Breakfast Club as well as performing freestyles for Funk Flex on his radio show.

On June 5, 2020, the group released an EP, "Now, More Than Ever", in the wake of the George Floyd protests. The project was supported by the single "Iamlegend". The EP debuted and peaked at number 168 on the Billboard 200. The group contributed a remix of the Metallica song "The Unforgiven", featuring DJ Scratch, to the charity tribute album The Metallica Blacklist, released in September 2021.

== Discography ==
=== Studio albums ===
List of studio albums, with selected chart positions, sales figures and certifications
Title	Album details	Peak chart positions										Certifications
Title	Album details	US	US R&B	US Rap	AUS	CAN	FRA	GER	NZ	SWI	UK	Certifications
3001: A Laced Odyssey	Released: March 11, 2016; Label: The Glorious Dead; Formats: CD, digital download, vinyl	10	2	2	39	13	179	72	27	29	105	
Vacation in Hell	Released: April 6, 2018; Label: The Glorious Dead; Formats: CD, digital download, vinyl	11	9	8	59	13	176	—	33	44	—	
"—" denotes a recording that did not chart or was not released in that territory.

=== Collaborative albums ===
List of collaborative albums, with year released
Title	Album details
Escape from New York (with Pro Era and The Underachievers as Beast Coast)	Released: May 24, 2019; Label: Beast Coast Media; Formats: CD, digital download, vinyl

=== EPs ===
List of extended plays, with selected details
Title	Album details
Clockwork Indigo (with The Underachievers as Clockwork Indigo)	Released: October 17, 2014; Label: Self-released; Formats: Digital download
Now, More Than Ever	Released: June 5, 2020; Label: The Glorious Dead; Formats: Digital download

=== Mixtapes ===
List of mixtapes, with year released
Title	Album details
D.R.U.G.S.	Released: July 24, 2012; Label: Self-released; Format: Digital download
BetterOffDead	Released: September 11, 2013; Label: ElectricKoolAde Records; Format: Digital download

=== Singles ===
Title	Year	Album
"Caps Lock"	2010	Non-album singles
"Gucci Gucci"	2011	Non-album singles
"Suspiria"	2011	Non-album singles
"Thug Waffle"	2011	D.R.U.G.S.
"Laker Paper"	2012	D.R.U.G.S.
"The Hangover"	2012	Non-album single
"MRAZ"	2012	BetterOffDead
"When In Roam"	2013	Non-album singles
"No Religion" (featuring AK the Savior)	2013	Non-album singles
"Palm Trees"	2013	BetterOffDead
"Blacktivist"	2015	Non-album singles
"Glorious Thugs"	2016	Non-album singles
"Bounce"	2016	3001: A Laced Odyssey
"This Is It"	2016	3001: A Laced Odyssey
"Aries" (featuring Deadcuts)	2016	Non-album singles
"Babel"	2017	Non-album singles
"Lava"	2017	Non-album singles
"Headstone"	2018	Vacation In Hell
"U&I" (featuring Dia)	2018	Vacation In Hell
"Vacation" (featuring Joey Badass)	2018	Vacation In Hell
"New World Order"	2018	Non-album singles
"Monica" (featuring Tech N9ne)	2019	Non-album singles
"Iamlegend"	2020	Now, More Than Ever
"Afterlife"	2020	Non-album single

=== "Day Of The Dead" releases ===
Title	Year
"LiT" (featuring Yasmin)	2014
"Don't Do Drugs Kids"	2014
"Get Yours" (featuring Diamante)	2014
"Red Light, Green Light" (featuring Espa)	2014
"My Team Supreme 2.0" (featuring Bodega Bamz)	2014
"Belly"	2014
"Half-Time" (featuring ASAP Twelvyy)	2015
"Plz Don't Make Me Do It" (featuring Domo Genesis)	2015
"RedEye To Paris" (featuring Skepta)	2015
"Did U Ever Think" (featuring Joey Badass and Issa Gold)	2015

=== Guest appearances ===
List of non-single guest appearances, with other performing artists, showing year released and album name
Title	Year	Other artist(s)	Album
"Bath Salt"	2012	ASAP Rocky, ASAP Ant	Lords Never Worry
"Thrilla"	2012	Bodega Bamz	Strictly 4 My P.A.P.I.Z.
"Just Blowin' In the Wind"	2012	RZA	The Man with the Iron Fists
"Mini Van Dan (Remix)"	2012	A$ton Matthews, ASAP Nast, Danny Brown	Versace Ragz
"Piss Test (Remix)"	2012	A-Trak, Jim Jones, El-P, Flosstradamus	Fool's Gold Presents: Loosies
"36 Chamber Flow"	2012	—N/a	Fool's Gold Presents: Loosies
"Mood Swings"	2013	Overdoz, Worlds Fair	—N/a
"No Religion"	2013	The Underachievers	—N/a
"New Brooklyn"	2013	Dyme-A-Duzin, The Underachievers	The New York Renaissance
"Inf Beams"	2013	—N/a	The New York Renaissance
"Tomorrow's Gone"	2013	Mr. Muthafuckin eXquire, Nacho Picasso, Danny Brown	Kismet
"Camouflage Dons"	2013	Statik Selektah, Smif-n-Wessun	Extended Play
"My Jeep"	2013	Joey Badass, the Underachievers	Summer Knights EP
"TLC"	2014	A$ton Matthews, Action Bronson	Aston 3:16
"Believe in the Shield"	2014	Smoke DZA	Ringside 2
"97.92"	2014	Trash Talk	CONS EP VOL. 1
"Modern Mayhem"	2014	Trash Talk	CONS EP VOL. 2
"Bring Em Out"	2015	Bodega Bamz	Sidewalk Exec
"Good Knight"	2015	Kirk Knight, Joey Badass, Dizzy Wright	Late Knight Special
"A Glorious Death"	2017	ASAP Twelvyy	12
"What Happens"	2017	ASAP Mob, Pro Era	Cozy Tapes Vol. 2: Too Cozy

=== Solo albums ===
Title	Year	Artist	Album Details
Arcstrumentals, Vol. 2	2018	Erick Arc Elliott	Released: February 16, 2018; Label: The Glorious Dead Records; Formats: CD, digital download, vinyl
Gothic Luxury	2022	Meechy Darko	Released: August 26, 2022; Label: Loma Vista Recordings; Formats: CD, digital download, vinyl
Love Without Conditions	2023	Zombie Juice	Released: April 21, 2023; Label: Terp World LLC; Formats: CD, digital download, vinyl

== Music videos ==
List of music videos, with directors, showing year released
Title	Year	Director(s)
"Thug Waffle"	2012	Luke Monaghan
"S.C.O.S.A."	2012	The Madbury Club
"Face-Off"	2012	Phillip Annand
"MRAZ"	2013	Phillip Annand
"Death"	2013	Tone • Vinny Picone
"My Team Supreme 2.0" (featuring Bodega Bamz)	2014	The Last American B-Boy
"Thugnificense"	2014	Juice
"Palm Trees"	2014	A Plus Filmz
"Blacktivist"	2015	Mario Pfeifer
"Bounce"	2016	A Plus Filmz
"This Is It"	2016	Phillip Annand
"Smoke Break/Fly Away"	2016	Fredo Tovar • Scott Fleishman • EDWIN
"Trade-Off"	2016	Jayga Rayn
"Headstone"	2018	Luke Monaghan
"Vacation" (featuring Joey Badass)	2018	The Madbury Club
"New World Order"	2018	Johnny LeFlare
"Monica" (featuring Tech N9ne)	2019	Noah Porter
"Afterlife"	2020	Arnaud Bresson
