= 3001: A Laced Odyssey =

Studio album by Flatbush Zombies
- Released: March 11, 2016
- Recorded: 2014–2016
- Genre: Hip-hop
- Length: 1:00:51
- Label: Glorious Dead Recordings
- Producer: Erick Arc Elliott

Flatbush Zombies chronology
BetterOffDEAD (2013)	3001: A Laced Odyssey (2016)	Vacation in Hell (2018)

Singles from 3001: A Laced Odyssey
- 1. "Bounce" Released: February 5, 2016; 2. "This Is It" Released: March 10, 2016

3001: A Laced Odyssey is the debut studio album by the American hip-hop group Flatbush Zombies. It was released on March 11, 2016, through their own independent record label Glorious Dead Recordings. Entirely produced by member Erick Arc Elliott, it features guest appearances from Anthony Flammia and Diamante.

In the United States, the album peaked at number 10 on the Billboard 200, number 2 on both the Top R&B/Hip-Hop Albums and Top Rap Albums, and atop the Independent Albums charts.

== Critical reception ==
Professional ratings
Aggregate scores
Source	Rating
AnyDecentMusic?	7.1/10
Metacritic	80/100
Review scores
Source	Rating
AllMusic	4/5 stars
Clash	8/10
Consequence of Sound	B−
HipHopDX	4.2/5
Pitchfork	7.2/10
RapReviews	9/10
Tiny Mix Tapes	4/5 marks
XXL	4/5

3001: A Laced Odyssey was met with universal acclaim from music critics. At Metacritic, which assigns a normalized rating out of 100 to reviews from mainstream publications, the album received an average score of 80 based on seven reviews. The aggregator AnyDecentMusic? has the critical consensus of the album at a 7.1 out of 10, based on six reviews.

Keith Nelson Jr. of HipHopDX praised the album, stating: "produced entirely by Erick "The Architect" Elliott, the 12-song mind trip is hodgepodge of haunting strings, ambient sounds fit for a sci-fi film and hard-hitting drums". AllMusic's David Jeffries resumed: "an excellent debut that flows perfectly and offers something new with every return". Hugh Leask of Clash found "the impressive chemistry the trio displayed on their earlier work continues here". Brooklyn Russell of Tiny Mix Tapes wrote: "a journey into their liberated, tie-dyed consciousness and their best project to date". Chris Gibbons of XXL called the album "a perfect first step in a career that is still blooming". Kathy Iandoli of Pitchfork wrote: "3001: A Laced Odyssey does an adequate job of reminding us all of Flatbush Zombies' smart, sharp lyrics. What they lack in hit-single potential, they make up for in talent, but without a calling-card song it's hard to know what their next move is". Alejandra Ramirez of Consequence concluded: "their immaturity and brusqueness is flavored with a new level of social consciousness and introspection".

== Track listing ==
No.	Title	Length
1.	"The Odyssey"	6:03
2.	"Bounce"	4:01
3.	"R.I.P.C.D."	4:05
4.	"A Spike Lee Joint" (featuring Anthony Flammia)	4:15
5.	"Fly Away"	2:29
6.	"Ascension"	5:01
7.	"Smoke Break" (Interlude)	2:04
8.	"Trade-Off"	4:09
9.	"Good Grief" (featuring Diamante)	4:31
10.	"New Phone, Who Dis?"	5:31
11.	"This Is It"	5:43
12.	"Your Favorite Rap Song"	12:59
Total length:		1:00:51

== Personnel ==
- Erick "The Architect" Elliott – vocals (tracks: 1–4, 7–12), producer, engineering, booklet art
- Antonio "Zombie Juice" Lewis – vocals (tracks: 1–4, 7–12)
- Demetri "Meechy Darko" Simms – vocals (tracks: 1–3, 5, 6, 8, 10–12)
- Anthony Flammia – vocals (track 4)
- Diamante – vocals (track 9)
- Joel Gutman – mixing
- Bruce Templeton – mastering
- David Nakayama – cover art
- Cherdsak Moeikunmak – booklet art
- ZIGvrt – booklet art
- P.T.A. – back cover art
- Tell Your Children – back cover art

== Charts ==
=== Weekly charts ===
Chart (2016)	Peak position
Australian Albums (ARIA)	39
Belgian Albums (Ultratop Flanders)	150
Canadian Albums (Billboard)	13
French Albums (SNEP)	179
German Albums (Offizielle Top 100)	72
New Zealand Albums (RMNZ)	27
Swiss Albums (Schweizer Hitparade)	29
UK Albums (OCC)	105
UK R&B Albums (OCC)	10
UK Independent Albums (OCC)	15
US Billboard 200	10
US Top R&B/Hip-Hop Albums (Billboard)	2
US Top Rap Albums (Billboard)	2
US Independent Albums (Billboard)	1

=== Year-end charts ===
Chart (2016)	Position
US Top R&B/Hip-Hop Albums (Billboard)	82
