= Lost in Translation (mixtape) =

Mixtape by Mr. Muthafuckin' eXquire
- Released: September 11, 2011
- Genre: Hip-hop
- Length: 68:55
- Label: Mishka NYC
- Producers: Charli Brown Beatz; Necro; El-P; Constrobuz; Jake One; BoweryBeats; Esoteric; eXquire

Mr. Muthafuckin' eXquire chronology
| The Big Fat Kill (2008) | Lost in Translation (2011) | Merry eXmas & Suck My Dick (2011) |

Singles from Lost in Translation
- 1. "Huzzah!" Released: July 3, 2012

Lost in Translation is the second mixtape by American rapper Mr. Muthafuckin' eXquire. It was released via Mishka NYC on September 11, 2011. It includes guest appearances from Despot, Das Racist, Danny Brown, and El-P.

== Artwork ==
The mixtape's cover art is a photograph of a porn actress Lethal Lipps drinking a bottle and putting her hand down her dress while Mr. Muthafuckin' eXquire passes out in a bathtub in the background. It was shot on the day his grandmother had a stroke and almost died. He drank a lot of Cîroc and passed out in a bathtub in his house. In a 2012 interview with Billboard, he said, "That picture is really about how fucked up my life was at that time."

== Critical reception ==
Professional ratings
Review scores
| Source | Rating |
|---|---|
| Exclaim! | favorable |
| Pitchfork | 7.9/10 |

Phillip Mlynar of The Village Voice described the mixtape as "an off-kilter gem that harnesses the uncompromising attitude of Ol' Dirty Bastard (more on that later) with the chops of someone who can rhyme his ass off."

Stereogum named it the mixtape of the week. In November 2011, Brandon Soderberg of Spin included it on the "50 Mixtapes You Need Now" list. Alex Gale of Complex placed it at number 6 on the "25 Best Mixtapes of 2011" list.

"The Last Huzzah!" was placed at number 46 on Rolling Stone's "50 Best Singles of 2011" list, number 30 on Consequence of Sound's "Top 50 Songs of 2011" list, and number 59 on Pitchfork's "Top 100 Tracks of 2011" list.

== Track listing ==
| No. | Title | Producer(s) | Length |
|---|---|---|---|
| 1. | "Triple F" | Charli Brown Beatz | 3:33 |
| 2. | "Huzzah!" | Necro | 4:14 |
| 3. | "Fire Marshall Bill" | El-P | 3:41 |
| 4. | "Chicken Spot Rock" (featuring Dallas tha Kid) | El-P | 3:59 |
| 5. | "Cockmeat Sandwich" / "Pissin' Between Train Cars" | El-P | 7:29 |
| 6. | "Weight of Water" | Constrobuz | 3:38 |
| 7. | "I Should Be Sleepin'" | Charli Brown Beatz | 5:06 |
| 8. | "Maltese Falcon Pt. 1 and 2" | Jake One; BoweryBeats | 3:57 |
| 9. | "Michael Dudikoff" | BoweryBeats | 1:23 |
| 10. | "Hip Hop Networking 101" (skit) | | 0:50 |
| 11. | "Lou Ferigno's Mad" | Constrobuz | 2:52 |
| 12. | "Lovesponge" | | 2:29 |
| 13. | "Nuthin' Even Matters (Regrets)" | | 4:38 |
| 14. | "YeahRight!.com" (skit) | | 1:41 |
| 15. | "Galactus Redux" | Esoteric | 2:49 |
| 16. | "Build-a-Bitch" | El-P; eXquire | 5:14 |
| 17. | "No Time" (featuring Goldie Glo) | El-P | 5:39 |
| 18. | "The Last Huzzah!" (bonus track; featuring Despot, Das Racist, Danny Brown, and El-P) | Necro | 5:31 |
