= BetterOffDEAD =

Mixtape by Flatbush Zombies
- Released: September 11, 2013
- Recorded: 2012–2013
- Genre: Hip hop
- Length: 65:51
- Label: ElectricKoolAde Records
- Producer: Erick Arc Elliott; Harry Fraud; Obey City

Flatbush Zombies chronology
| D.R.U.G.S (2012) | BetterOffDEAD (2013) | 3001: A Laced Odyssey (2016) |

Professional ratings
Review scores
| Source | Rating |
|---|---|
| Consequence of Sound | C+ |
| Exclaim! | 7/10 |

BetterOffDEAD is the second mixtape by American hip hop trio Flatbush Zombies. It was released on September 11, 2013, by ElectricKoolAde Records.

== Background ==
The Flatbush Zombies are a Brooklyn-based hip hop group that are part of the East Coast hip hop movement known as "Beast Coast," which also consists of fellow Brooklyn rap groups The Underachievers and Pro Era.

Group member Erick Arc Elliott, who had been making his own solo music, decided to bring childhood friends Meechy Darko and Zombie Juice together musically around 2010. Their first club performance took place in 2012, at 307 in Waterloo. The group's popularity grew that year after releasing the music video of their track "Thug Waffle" on YouTube, followed up with the release of their debut mixtape, titled D.R.U.G.S.

On July 29, 2013, Flatbush Zombies released a YouTube video announcing their second mixtape, which would be titled BetterOffDEAD. It was released at exactly 9:11 PM on September 11, 2013. The singles "MRAZ," "Palm Trees," and "222" are included on the nineteen track mixtape. Though Elliott is the main producer, Harry Fraud and Obey City also provide production on the mixtape. Danny Brown and Action Bronson are the two features on the mixtape and appear on the tracks "Drug Parade" and "Club Soda" respectively.

== Critical reception ==
The mixtape was met with critical acclaim. It would end up being ranked at number 17 on XXL's list of the best mixtapes of 2013.

== Track listing ==
All tracks produced by Erick Arc Elliott, except for "LiveFromHell," which was produced by Harry Fraud, and "TP4," which was produced by Obey City.

| No. | Title | Length |
|---|---|---|
| 1. | "Amerikkkan Pie" | 4:29 |
| 2. | "Nephilim" | 3:20 |
| 3. | "Bliss" | 3:24 |
| 4. | "Minephuck" | 1:58 |
| 5. | "G Tearz" | 4:18 |
| 6. | "Death" | 3:40 |
| 7. | "Death 2" | 1:29 |
| 8. | "Regular and Complex (GNB)" | 4:55 |
| 9. | "Thugnificense" | 3:03 |
| 10. | "Club Soda" (featuring Action Bronson) | 4:05 |
| 11. | "LiveFromHell" | 2:33 |
| 12. | "Palm Trees" | 4:21 |
| 13. | "222" (featuring Bridget Perez) | 4:36 |
| 14. | "Drug Parade" (featuring Danny Brown) | 2:58 |
| 15. | "TP4" | 2:45 |
| 16. | "GOD Blessed the DEAD" | 2:17 |
| 17. | "MRAZ" | 4:54 |
| 18. | "My Team, SUPREME" | 2:41 |
| 19. | "The Results Are In" | 4:20 |
| Total length: | | 65:51 |
