= Power & Passion =

EP by Mr. Muthafuckin' eXquire
- Released: November 6, 2012
- Genre: Hip-hop
- Length: 18:17
- Label: Universal Republic
- Producers: Dot da Genius; Harry Fraud; El-P; SpaceGhostPurrp; Blue Sky Black Death

Mr. Muthafuckin' eXquire chronology
The Man in the High Castle (2012)	Power & Passion (2012)	Kismet (2013)

Power & Passion is the second extended play (EP) by American rapper Mr. Muthafuckin' eXquire. It was released on Universal Republic Records, as his major record label debut, on November 6, 2012. It includes production from Dot da Genius, Harry Fraud, El-P, SpaceGhostPurrp, and Blue Sky Black Death, as well as guest appearances from Gucci Mane and Goldie Glo. A music video was released for "The Message Pt. 1 & 2".

== Promotion ==
Prior to the release of Power & Passion, Mr. Muthafuckin' eXquire released "Position of Passion" as a prelude to the project. The song uses the beat of 50 Cent's song "Position of Power".

== Critical reception ==
Professional ratings
Aggregate scores
Source	Rating
Metacritic	60/100
Review scores
Source	Rating
Consequence of Sound	D
HipHopDX	3.5/5
Pitchfork	5.4/10
Spin	7/10
XXL	L

At Metacritic, which assigns a weighted average score out of 100 to reviews from mainstream critics, Power & Passion received an average score of 60, based on 5 reviews, indicating "mixed or average reviews".

Jesse Fairfax of HipHopDX gave the EP a 3.5 out of 5, commenting that "Previously proving capable of awareness and self-scrutiny, Mr. Muthafuckin eXquire is dedicated to regression this go round with Power & Passion, pandering to the notion that entertainment can be drawn from sheer recklessness." Jonah Bromwich of Pitchfork gave the EP a 5.4 out of 10, calling it "a vulgar, dissonant listen" and "wildly inconsistent on a bar-by-bar basis." Brandon Soderberg of Spin gave the EP a 7 out of 10, describing the beats as "a chillwave-meets-Bomb Squad sound full of Morricone moans, ringing Black Sabbath riffs, and from-a-black-hole bass."

== Track listing ==
No.	Title	Producer(s)	Length
1.	"Cari Zalioni"	Dot da Genius	3:02
2.	"Cheap Whores & Champagne"	Harry Fraud	3:32
3.	"Telephuck" (featuring Gucci Mane)	El-P	3:51
4.	"Supa Speaks (Interlude)"		1:26
5.	"Aggin Laer" (featuring Goldie Glo)	SpaceGhostPurrp	3:12
6.	"The Message Pt. 1 & 2"	Blue Sky Black Death	3:12
