= Cellar Door: Terminus ut Exordium =

Studio album by the Underachievers
- Released: August 12, 2014
- Recorded: 2013–14
- Genre: East Coast hip-hop
- Length: 40:06
- Label: RPM MSC Distribution
- Producers: Frzn Productions; Death Tarot; Statik Selektah; Haleek Maul; Ryan Hemsworth; Jordan Dalby; Brandun DeShay; Two Fresh Beats; Supreme Cuts; Lapalux; The Ruby Suns; Nick Leon; Portugal. The Man

The Underachievers chronology
Lords of Flatbush (2013)	Cellar Door: Terminus ut Exordium (2014)	Evermore: The Art of Duality (2015)

Cellar Door: Terminus ut Exordium is the debut studio album by American hip hop duo the Underachievers. It was released on August 12, 2014 by RPM MSC Distribution.

== Production ==
Producers who contributed in the album includes Frzn Aquarium, Death Tarot, Statik Selektah, Haleek Maul, Ryan Hemsworth, Jordan Dalby, Brandun DeShay, Two Fresh Beats, Supreme Cuts, Lapalux, The Ruby Suns, Nick Leon, Portugal. The Man, and Nick Leon. The cover art was painted by Pencil Fingerz.

== Reception ==
Professional ratings
Review scores
Source	Rating
AllMusic	3.5/5 stars
Exclaim!	8/10
HipHopDX	3.5/5 stars
XXL	4/5 (XL)

=== Critical ===
Cellar Door: Terminus Ut Exordium was met with generally positive reviews from critics. At Metacritic, which assigns a normalized rating out of 100 to reviews from mainstream critics, the album received an average score of 75, based on 5 reviews, indicating "generally favorable reviews".

=== Commercial ===
The album debuted at No. 86 on the Billboard 200, and No. 16 on Top R&B/Hip Hop Albums on the first week of its release. The album has sold 8,000 copies in the United States as of September 2015.

== Track listing ==
No.	Title	Producer(s)	Length
1.	"Luminescence"	Frzn Productions	2:41
2.	"Chrysalis"	Death Tarot	3:10
3.	"Radiance"	Statik Selektah	3:28
4.	"Caprice"	Haleek Maul	3:12
5.	"Incandescent"	Ryan Hemsworth	3:13
6.	"Sonorous"	Jordan Dalby	3:38
7.	"Metropolis"	brandUn DeShay	3:59
8.	"Nebulous"	Two Fresh Beats	3:34
9.	"Ethereal"	Supreme Cuts	3:01
10.	"Quiescent"	Lapalux	2:57
11.	"Felicity"	The Ruby Suns; Nick Leon	3:45
12.	"Amorphous" (featuring Portugal. The Man)	Portugal. The Man; Nick Leon	3:21
Total length:			40:06

== Charts ==
Chart (2014)	Peak position
US Billboard 200	86
US Top R&B/Hip-Hop Albums (Billboard)	16
US Independent Albums (Billboard)	12
