= Sidewalk Exec =

Sidewalk Exec...

Studio album by Bodega Bamz
- Released: April 14, 2015
- Recorded: 2014–15
- Genre: East Coast hip hop
- Length: 35:30
- Label: 100 Keep It; Duck Down Music
- Producer: Bodega Bamz (exec.); Obed "Ohla" De La Rosa (exec.); V'Don

Bodega Bamz chronology
Sunday Service (2014)	Sidewalk Exec... (2015)	Menace Tan Society (2015)

Professional ratings
Review scores
Source	Rating
HipHopDX	3.5/5

Sidewalk Exec... is the debut studio album by American rapper Bodega Bamz. It was released on April 14, 2015, through 100 Keep It/Duck Down Music. Production was handled entirely by Tivon "V Don" Key, with Ohla and Bodega Bamz serving as executive producers. It features guest appearances from A$ton Matthews, Flatbush Zombies, Joell Ortiz, Lil' Eto and Youth Is Dead. The album appeared on several Billboard charts, peaking at No. 3 on the Top Heatseekers, No. 26 on the Independent Albums, No. 25 on the Top R&B/Hip-Hop Albums and No. 20 on the Top Rap Albums.

== Track listing ==
No.	Title	Writer(s)	Length
1.	"Down These Mean Streets"	Nathaniel De La Rosa; Tivon Key	2:07
2.	"Bring Em Out" (featuring Flatbush Zombies)	N. De La Rosa; Antonio Lewis; Erick Elliot; Dimitri Simms; Key	4:25
3.	"Whoopty Woop Blahzay Blah"	N. De La Rosa; Key	2:52
4.	"Gods Honest" (featuring Joell Ortiz)	N. De La Rosa; Joell Ortiz; Key	2:49
5.	"Cocaine Dreaming" (featuring Youth Is Dead)	N. De La Rosa; Christoforo Donadi; Key	2:29
6.	"El-Rey"	N. De La Rosa; Key	2:57
7.	"Invoice" (featuring A$ton Matthews)	N. De La Rosa; Matthew Lopez; Key	2:54
8.	"Raw Deal"	N. De La Rosa; Obed De La Rosa; Key	2:02
9.	"Killa" (featuring Lil' Eto)	N. De La Rosa; Alvin Olavarria; Key	3:09
10.	"Billy Bats"	N. De La Rosa; Key	4:10
11.	"Everybody Eats (Interlude)"	N. De La Rosa; Key	1:57
12.	"I'm Ready" (featuring A$AP Yams)	N. De La Rosa; O. De La Rosa; Key	3:39
Total length:			35:30

== Charts ==
Chart performance for Sidewalk Exec
Chart (2015)	Peak position
US Heatseekers Albums (Billboard)	3
US Independent Albums (Billboard)	26
US Top R&B/Hip-Hop Albums (Billboard)	25
US Top Rap Albums (Billboard)	20
