= Mr. Muthafuckin' eXquire (album) =

Studio album by Mr. Muthafuckin' eXquire
- Released: July 12, 2019
- Genre: Hip-hop
- Length: 45:32
- Labels: Chocolate Rabbit; Soulspazm
- Producers: Grimm Doza; Arian Hagen; Conquest Phillips; Constrobuz; Parallel Thought; Iceberg Black; 3LLL; All These Fingers

Mr. Muthafuckin' eXquire chronology
Brainiac (2017)	Mr. Muthafuckin' eXquire (2019)

Singles from Mr. Muthafuckin' eXquire
- 1. "Fck Boy!" Released: June 10, 2019

Mr. Muthafuckin' eXquire is the debut studio album by American rapper Mr. Muthafuckin' eXquire. It was released via Chocolate Rabbit and Soulspazm on July 12, 2019. It features guest appearances from Wiki, Kast, and Iceberg Black.

== Critical reception ==
Professional ratings
Aggregate scores
Source	Rating
Metacritic	67/100
Review scores
Source	Rating
HipHopDX	3.7/5
Pitchfork	7.8/10
Spectrum Culture	3.25/5

At Metacritic, which assigns a weighted average score out of 100 to reviews from mainstream critics, the album received an average score of 67, based on 4 reviews, indicating "generally favorable reviews".

Bernadette Giacomazzo of HipHopDX gave the album a 3.7 out of 5, writing, "'Fuck' is peppered liberally throughout the album, but it's always used to buttress razor-sharp political commentary ... not just said for shock value." Phillip Mlynar of Pitchfork gave the album a 7.8 out of 10, commenting that "The tirade is eXquire in capsule form, erudite and profane, delivering pop culture and politics in a spellbinding, seamless flow."

Uproxx included it on the "Best Rap Albums of July 2019" list.

"Pink Champagne" was chosen by Clash as the "Track of the Day" on July 29, 2019.

== Track listing ==
No.	Title	Producer(s)	Length
1.	"Fck Boy!"	Grimm Doza	3:24
2.	"The eXplanation"	Arian Hagen	1:29
3.	"Polarity"	Conquest Phillips	3:20
4.	"A Definite Maybe" (featuring Wiki)	Constrobuz	4:16
5.	"Pink Champagne"	Constrobuz	3:22
6.	"Nosediive" (featuring Kast)	Parallel Thought	4:38
7.	"Up"	Arian Hagen	1:27
8.	"Better Clothes & Nicer Lies" (featuring Iceberg Black)	Iceberg Black	2:41
9.	"Rumblefish"	Constrobuz	4:22
10.	"I Love Hoes"	3LLL	3:46
11.	"Nothing's What It Seems: Short Film"	All These Fingers; Constrobuz	8:20
12.	"Silence"		4:27
Total length:			45:32
