= Bodega Bamz =

American rapper (born 1985)

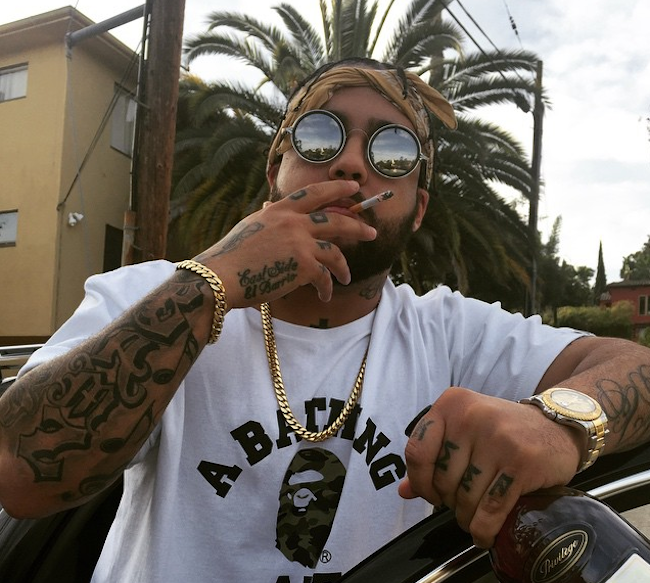
- Bodega Bamz in East Harlem, New York, 2019

Background information
- Also known as: Papi
- Born: Nathaniel De La Rosa; March 17, 1985 (age 41); New York City, New York, U.S.
- Genres: Hip hop
- Occupations: Rapper; songwriter; actor
- Years active: 2009–present
- Labels: 100 Keep It; Duck Down; Empire
- Member of: No Panty
- Website: 100keepit.bigcartel.com

Nathaniel De La Rosa (born March 17, 1985), known professionally as Bodega Bamz, is an American rapper, songwriter and actor. De La Rosa's 2012 mixtape, Strictly 4 My P.A.P.I.Z featured ASAP Ferg, Joell Ortiz, A$ton Matthews, Tego Calderon and Flatbush Zombies. De La Rosa later collaborated with the Martinez Brothers and released an EP, Sunday Service (2014). In 2015, he released his debut album, Sidewalk Exec. In 2016 he formed the group No Panty, with Joell Ortiz and Nitty Scott, and released the mixtape Westside Highway Story, produced by Salaam Remi. In 2017, he was cast in the Showtime series SMILF.

== Career ==
In 2012 he released the mixtape Strictly 4 My P.A.P.I.Z, which includes features from ASAP Ferg, Joell Ortiz, A$ton Matthews, and Flatbush Zombies. Bodega Bamz and The Martinez Brothers released an EP, Sunday Service in 2014. In 2015, Bodega Bamz released his debut album Sidewalk Exec. He made his acting debut in his own film The Streets Owe Me, appeared in Hell Train and most recently was cast in the Showtime series, SMILF. In March 2020, he had a guest-starring role on the second season FBI.

== Discography ==
=== Studio albums ===
- Sidewalk Exec (2015)
- PAPI (2018)
- Yamz Heard This (2020)
- The Lost Pack (2022)

=== Mixtapes ===
- The Rest is Noise (2009)
- Loosies & Brewskies (2011)
- Strictly 4 My P.A.P.I.Z. (2012)
- Sunday Service (with The Martinez Brothers) (2014)
- Menace Tan Society (with Tanboys) (2015)
- All Eyez Off Me (2016)
- Westside Highway Story (with Joell Ortiz and Nitty Scott as No Panty, produced by Salaam Remi) (2016)
- Bodega's Way (2019)

=== Guest appearances ===
List of non-single guest appearances, with other performing artists, showing year released and album name
Title	Year	Artist(s)	Album
"Latino Heat"	2012	Aston Matthews	Versace Ragz
"Told Ya"	2012	ASAP Mob, ASAP Ant	Lords Never Worry
"Death Is Not an Option"	2012	Heems, Lakutis	Wild Water Kingdom
"Trap Lords"	2013	Funkmaster Flex, ASAP Ferg	Who You Mad At? Me or Yourself?
"Wadadaang (Black Boy/Tan Boy)"	2013	Black Dave	Black Bart
"1,000 Pounds"	2013	Trademark Da Skydiver	Flamingo Barnes 2: Mingo Royale
"Latino Heat, Pt. 2"	2014	Aston Matthews	Aston 3:16
"My Team Supreme 2.0"	2014	Flatbush Zombies	—N/a
"New Jack City is Mine"	2015	Mr. Green, Lumin Hao	Live From The Streets
"Going Back 2 (Joe Marinetti Remix)"	2015	Nick Hook, DJ Sliink, Crystal Caines, Nadus	Collage v1 Remixes
"Bodie"	2015	Eto Swazye	1983
"Bodega!"	2015	Statik Selektah	Lucky 7
"Latino, Pt. 2"	2015	Joell Ortiz, Illmind, Emilio Rojas, Chris Rivers	Human
"Shinigami"	2015	6ix9ine	SCUMMY SCUMZ
"Who Knocks"	2016	Meth Mouth	—N/a
"First or Last"	2016	DroFe	Narcowave 3
"Venetian Loafers"	2016	Meyhem Lauren	Precious Metals
"Where's the Love"	2016	Termanology, Bun B, Masspike Miles	More Politics
"Droppin Bodies"	2017	Don Krez, Pouya, Fat Nick	Prequel
"Time 4 This"	2017	Sha Hef	Out the Mud

== Filmography ==
=== Television ===
Year	Title	Role	Notes
2017–2019	SMILF	Carlos	6 episodes
2020	FBI	Santiago Gonzalez	Episode: "Emotional Rescue"
