= Clockwork Indigo EP =

Clockwork Indigo

EP by Clockwork Indigo
- Released: October 17, 2014
- Recorded: 2014
- Genre: Hip-hop
- Length: 22:51
- Label: Self-released
- Producer: The Architect

Clockwork Indigo is the self-titled EP by Clockwork Indigo, which consists of New York hip-hop groups Flatbush Zombies and the Underachievers. It was released on October 17, 2014, under Electric KooLade Records.

== Background ==
In an interview with Crossfade of Miami New Times, Issa Gold (member of the Underachievers) spoke of how the project started:

We knew that if we were going to tour, we wanted to do a collab project together. So when the tour came up, it was like, 'Alright, let's get this project done.' We all grew up in the same neighborhood. Me and Jewice lived in the same building and spent pretty much four to five years together, every day, just learning and doing psychedelics. Meechy and Jewice are best friends who knew each other even longer before that, and Meechy and Erick were best friends for even longer before that.

== Track listing ==
No.	Title	Length
1.	"Butterfly Effect"	7:13
2.	"LUAM"	5:15
3.	"XYNO"	4:22
4.	"Benefit Concert"	3:23
5.	"System"	2:38
Total length:		22:51
