= Vacation in Hell =

Studio album by Flatbush Zombies
- Released: April 6, 2018
- Recorded: 2016–2018
- Genre: East Coast hip hop
- Length: 76:54
- Label: Glorious Dead; ADA
- Producer: Erick Arc Elliott; Kirk Knight; Tyler Dopps; Hector Delgado; Anthony Flammia

Flatbush Zombies chronology
3001: A Laced Odyssey (2016)	Vacation in Hell (2018)	Now, More Than Ever (2020)

Vacation in Hell is the second studio album by the American hip hop trio, Flatbush Zombies. The album was released on April 6, 2018, through their own independent record label, Glorious Dead Recordings. The album received acclaim from critics who praised the album’s musical scope and the trio’s lyrics.

== Cover art ==
The cover art of Vacation in Hell is inspired by a picture of Jimi Hendrix. Jimi Hendrix was posing together with the fellow members of The Jimi Hendrix Experience, Noel Redding and Mitch Mitchell, between two naked women in that particular picture.

== Critical reception ==
At Metacritic, which assigns a normalized rating out of 100 to reviews from mainstream publications, the album received an average score of 79 based on 4 reviews. Pitchfork gave the album a 7.1 out of 10 saying, "there will never be a shortage of New York rappers penning lifeless stan raps, and if hip-hop wants them around, it’s fine. But Flatbush Zombies have more to offer. Across Vacation in Hell, flashes of lucidity spirit the Zombies outside of their stiffened corpses and evoke a world of camaraderie and brotherhood amid loss and sacrifice."Exclaim! gave Vacation In Hell a 9 out of 10 saying, "Overall, the trio showcase legend influences in their lines, while still authentically being themselves."

== Commercial performance ==
The album sold 27,140 album-equivalent units (12,921 pure) in the first week, debuting at number 11 on the US Billboard 200 chart.

== Track listing ==
All tracks produced by Erick Arc Elliott, except where noted.

No.	Title	Producer(s)	Length
1.	"HELL-O"	Tyler Dopps	2:53
2.	"Chunky"		3:53
3.	"Vacation" (featuring Joey Badass)	Erick Arc Elliott; Tyler Dopps	3:57
4.	"M. Bison"		4:00
5.	"Headstone"		4:19
6.	"Big Shrimp"	Kirk Knight	3:58
7.	"Leather Symphony" (featuring ASAP Twelvyy)		3:53
8.	"Reel Girls" (featuring Bun B)		4:27
9.	"Facts" (featuring Jadakiss)		4:33
10.	"Ask Courtney"	Hector Delgado	3:04
11.	"Crown" (featuring Portugal. The Man)		4:57
12.	"Proxies"		3:22
13.	"U&I" (featuring Dia)		5:16
14.	"The Goddess" (featuring Dave B.)		4:00
15.	"Trapped"	Erick Arc Elliott; Anthony Flammia	5:15
16.	"Best American"		3:56
17.	"Misunderstood" (featuring Nyck Caution)	Hector Delgado; Erick Arc Elliott	2:31
18.	"YouAreMySunshine"		2:50
19.	"The Glory" (featuring Denzel Curry)		5:50
Total length:			76:54

Notes

- "Chunky" and "Trapped" contain additional vocals from Dia

== Charts ==
Chart (2018)	Peak position
Australian Albums (ARIA)	59
Belgian Albums (Ultratop Flanders)	126
Canadian Albums (Billboard)	13
Dutch Albums (Album Top 100)	126
New Zealand Albums (RMNZ)	33
Swiss Albums (Schweizer Hitparade)	44
US Billboard 200	11
US Top R&B/Hip-Hop Albums (Billboard)	9
