= Forever More =

Forever More or Forevermore may refer to:

== Music ==
=== Performers ===
- Forever More (band), a 1969–1974 Scottish progressive rock band
- Forevermore (band), an American Christian metalcore band formed in 2009

=== Albums ===
- Forever More (album), by Tesla, or the title song, 2008
- Forevermore (David Archuleta album) or the title song, 2012
- Forevermore (Juris album) or the title song, 2011
- Forevermore (Whitesnake album) or the title song, 2011
- Forevermore, by Destine, 2015
- Forevermore, by Isole, 2005
- The Absolute Universe: Forevermore (Extended Version), by Transatlantic, 2021

=== Songs ===
- "Forever More" (Moloko song), 2003
- "Forever More" (Puff Johnson song), 1996
- "Forevermore" (Yuna song), 2019
- "Forever More", by Amorphis from Am Universum, 2001
- "Forevermore", by Atreyu from The Beautiful Dark of Life, 2023
- "Forevermore", by Epica and Ruurd Woltring, 2012
- "Forevermore", by Ike Moriz, 2014
- "Forevermore", by Lorna Shore from I Feel the Everblack Festering Within Me, 2025
- "Forevermore", by Shadows Fall from Threads of Life, 2007
- "Forevermore", by Side A, 1995
- "Forevermore", by Thunderstone from Evolution 4.0, 2007
- "Forevermore", by Xandria from Neverworld's End, 2012

== Television and film ==
- Forevermore (TV series), a 2014 Philippine romantic drama series
- Forevermore (film), a Philippine film of 2002
