= Erick Arc Elliott =

American rapper and record producer

Erick the Architect
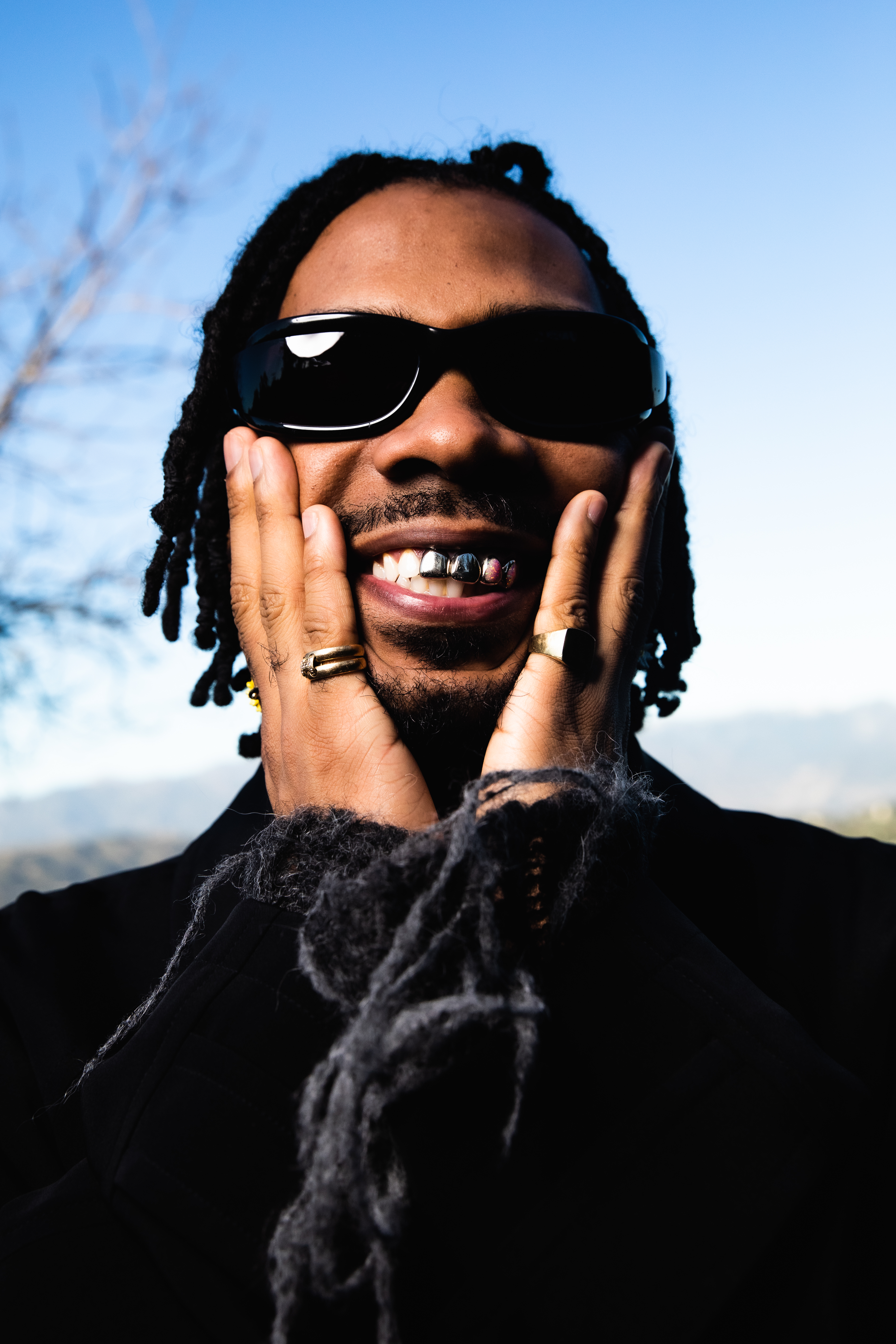
- Elliott in 2024

Background information
- Also known as: The Architect; Erick the Architect; Skinny Light; Skinny Ramen
- Born: Erick Elliott; August 12, 1988 (age 38); Brooklyn, New York, U.S.
- Genre: Hip hop
- Occupations: Rapper; songwriter; record producer
- Years active: 2010–present
- Labels: Architect Recording Company; Mass Appeal
- Member of: Flatbush Zombies; Beast Coast; Clockwork Indigo
- Website: www.erickthearchitect.com

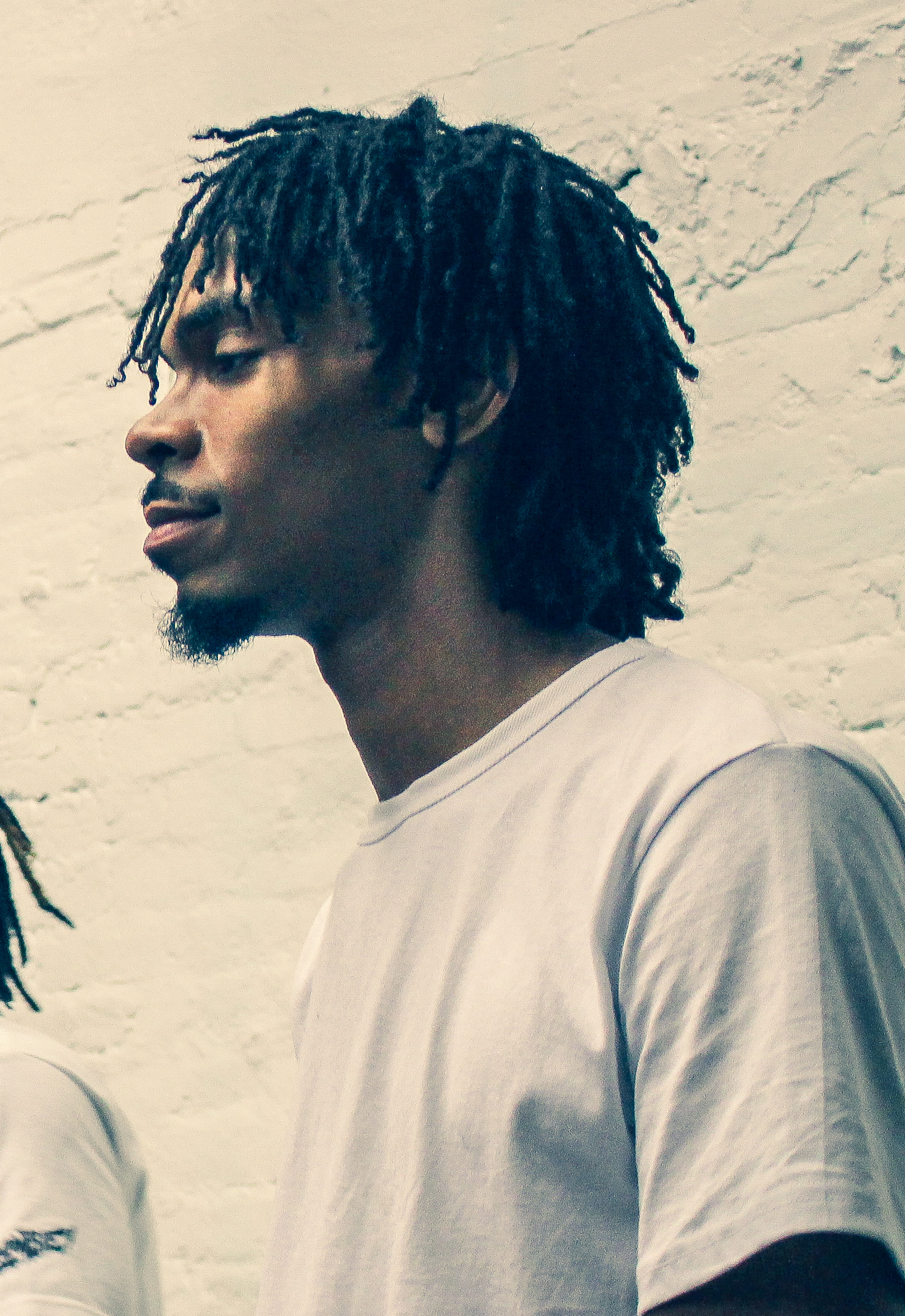
Elliott in 2014

Erick Elliott (born August 12, 1988), better known as Erick Arc Elliott or Erick the Architect, is an American rapper, singer, artist and record producer from Brooklyn, New York. A member of the hip hop trio Flatbush Zombies, Elliott has released multiple solo projects as well, including I've Never Been Here Before in February 2024.

Elliott plays multiple instruments including the keyboard, piano, and the guitar. He is the primary producer of Flatbush Zombies and has produced for other popular acts such as Joey Badass, James Blake, and more. He also scored the film The Choice Is Yours (2023) on Paramount+ starring Black Sheep and J Dilla. He's also featured on the track "Candle Flame" by Jungle that has over 100 million streams.

As the primary producer of Flatbush Zombies, the "architect" part of his name refers to constructing the groups' iconic sound.

In June 2026, he signed with Mass Appeal Records and announced an upcoming project.

== Discography ==
List of studio albums, with selected chart positions, sales figures and certifications
Title	Album details	Peak chart positions										Certifications
Title	Album details	US	US R&B	US Rap	AUS	CAN	FRA	GER	NZ	SWI	UK	Certifications
I've Never Been Here Before	Released: February 23, 2024; Label: Architect Recording Company; Formats: Vinyl, digital download	11		11								
"—" denotes a recording that did not chart or was not released in that territory.

=== EPs ===
List of extended plays, with selected details
Title	Album details
Future Proof	Released: January 22, 2021; Label: Architect Recording Company; Formats: Digital download, vinyl

=== Mixtapes ===
List of mixtapes, with year released
Title	Album details
noir.	Released: January 1, 2010; Label: Self-released; Format: Digital download
almost remembered.	Released: June 10, 2011; Label: Self-released; Format: Digital download
renvoi.	Released: August 26, 2011; Label: Self-released; Format: Digital download
ARCstrumentals: Vol. 1	Released: March 31, 2015; Label: Self-released; Format: SoundCloud
ARCstrumentals, Vol. 2	Released: February 16, 2018; Label: The Glorious Dead; Format: Digital download, CD

=== Singles ===
List of singles as featured performer, with selected chart positions, showing year released and album name
Title	Year	Peak chart positions			Album
Title	Year	US	US R&B	US Rap	Album
"Beverly Drive"	2024				I've Never Been Here Before: The Director's Cut
"Jammy Jam: Skinny Light Remix"	2024				I've Never Been Here Before
"Instincts" (featuring Westside Boogie)	2024				I've Never Been Here Before
"Shook Up" (featuring Joey Badass and Farr)	2023				I've Never Been Here Before
"Ezekiel's Wheel" (featuring George Clinton)	2023				I've Never Been Here Before
"Parkour"	2023				I've Never Been Here Before
"Let It Go" (featuring Loyle Carner and Farr)	2021				Future Proof EP
"Bounce"	2016	—	—	—	3001: A Laced Odyssey
"This Is It"	2016	—	—	—	3001: A Laced Odyssey
"—" denotes a title that did not chart, or was not released in that territory.

=== Guest appearances ===
List of non-single guest appearances, with other performing artists, showing year released and album name
Title	Year	Other artist(s)	Album
"Bath Salts"	2012	ASAP Rocky, ASAP Ant	Lords Never Worry
"Thrilla"	2012	Bodega Bamz	Strictly 4 My P.A.P.I.Z.
"Just Blowin' In the Wind"	2012	RZA	The Man with the Iron Fists
"Mini Van Dan (Remix)"	2012	Aston Matthews, ASAP Nast, Danny Brown	Versace Ragz
"Piss Test (Remix)"	2012	A-Trak, Jim Jones, El-P, Flosstradamus	Fool's Gold Presents: Loosies
"36 Chamber Flow"	2012	—N/a	Fool's Gold Presents: Loosies
"Mood Swings"	2013	Overdoz, Worlds Fair	—N/a
"No Religion"	2013	The Underachievers	—N/a
"New Brooklyn"	2013	Dyme-A-Duzin, The Underachievers	The New York Renaissance
"Inf Beams"	2013	—N/a	The New York Renaissance
"Tomorrow's Gone"	2013	Mr. Muthafuckin eXquire, Nacho Picasso, Danny Brown	Kismet
"Camouflage Dons"	2013	Statik Selektah, Smif-n-Wessun	Extended Play
"My Jeep"	2013	Joey Badass, The Underachievers	Summer Knights EP
"TLC"	2014	Aston Matthews, Action Bronson	Aston 3:16
"Believe in the Shied"	2014	Smoke DZA	Ringside 2
"97.92"	2014	Trash Talk	CONS EP VOL. 1
"Modern Mayhem"	2014	Trash Talk	CONS EP VOL. 2
"Bring Em Out"	2015	Bodega Bamz	Sidewalk Exec
"Good Knight"	2015	Kirk Knight, Joey Badass, Dizzy Wright	Late Knight Special
"Bowie"	2023	Sirens of Lesbos	Peace
"Polish Jazz"	2024	Chuck Strangers	A Forsaken Lover's Plea
"Sweet & Sublime"	2024	L'Impératrice	Pulsar
"Super Platinum"	2026	Madeon	Victory
"Vida"	2026	The Avalanches	No Bad Memories
