= Evermore: The Art of Duality =

Studio album by the Underachievers
- Released: September 25, 2015
- Recorded: 2014–2015
- Genre: East Coast hip-hop
- Length: 59:59
- Label: RPM MSC Distribution
- Producers: Ashton Benz; John "JohnGBeats" Gustanar; IGNORVNCE; Evan Imwalle; Phil Jackson; Rene McLean; Mr. Bristol; Nick León; POSHstronaut; Lucas Savo

The Underachievers chronology
Cellar Door: Terminus ut Exordium (2014)	Evermore: The Art of Duality (2015)	It Happened in Flatbush (2016)

Evermore: The Art of Duality is the second studio album by American hip-hop duo the Underachievers. It was released on September 25, 2015 by RPM MSC Distribution. The album peaked at No. 9 for a week on Billboard. The album cover artwork was created by Pencil Fingerz.

== Description ==
The album has two half-an-hour segments; acoustic and electronic. The starting track of the album is Rain Dance (Phase 1 Intro).

== Track listing ==
No.	Title	Producer(s)	Length
1.	"Rain Dance (Phase 1 Intro)"	Nick León	3:40
2.	"Shine All Gold"	Nick León	4:20
3.	"Chasing Faith"	Nick León	3:58
4.	"Star Signs"	Nick León	3:17
5.	"The Dualist"	Evan Imwalle; Nick León	4:28
6.	"Illusions"	Ashton Benz; Lucas Savo	4:17
7.	"The Brooklyn Way"	Phil Jackson for The WatcherZ	4:29
8.	"Reincarnation (Phase 2 Intro)"	IGNORVNCE	2:34
9.	"Take Your Place"	Mr. Bristol	3:32
10.	"Moon Shot"	Ashton Benz; Lucas Savo	4:19
11.	"Generation Z"	Nick León; POSHstronaut	4:48
12.	"Allusions"	Ashton Benz	4:05
13.	"We the Hope"	Nick León	4:28
14.	"Stay the Same"	John "JohnGBeats" Gustanar	3:44
15.	"Unconscious Monsters"	Nick León	4:00

== Credits ==
Artwork – Davis 'Pencilfingerz' Graham

Executive-Producer – AK The Savior*, Issa Gold, Nick León, Rene Mclean (2)

Mastered By – Daddy Kev

Mixed By – Daddy Kev (tracks: A1 to A6, B1, B6)

Producers – Ashton Benz (tracks: A6, B5), Evan Imwalle (tracks: A5), IGNORVNCE (tracks: B2), Lucas Savo (tracks: A6), Mrbist0l* (tracks: B3), Nick León (tracks: A1 to A5, B4, B6), POSHstronaut (tracks: B4), Phil Jackson (6) (tracks: B1)
