= The Underachievers =

American hip-hop duo

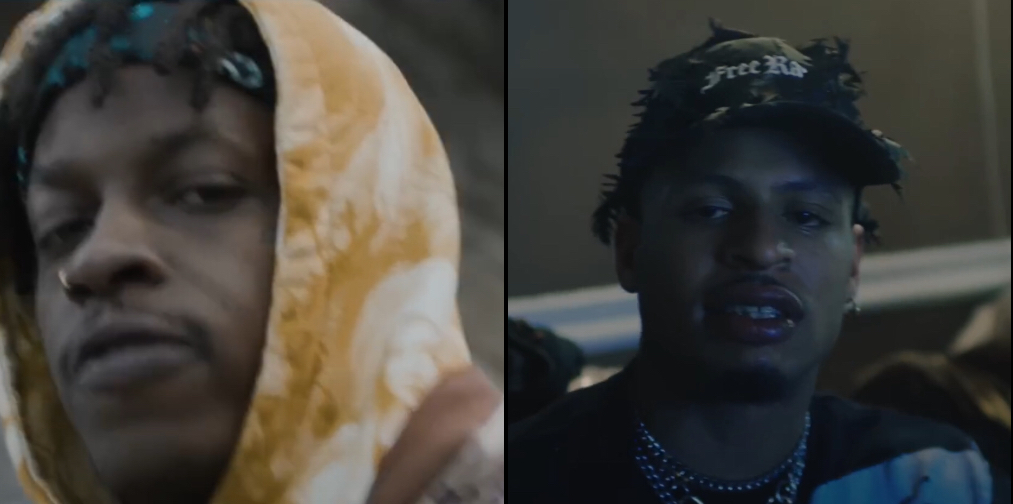
- The Underachievers in 2019

Background information
- Origin: Flatbush, New York City, U.S.
- Genres: East Coast hip-hop; psychedelic rap; conscious hip-hop
- Years active: 2011–present
- Labels: RPM MSC; Brainfeeder; Slang Music
- Spinoffs: Beast Coast
- Members: AK the Savior; Issa Gold

The Underachievers are an American hip-hop duo from Flatbush, New York. Formed in 2011, the duo is composed of rappers AK the Savior and Issa Gold. American record producer Flying Lotus signed the duo to his Brainfeeder record label in 2012. Following that signing they independently released two mixtapes, Indigoism and Lords of Flatbush in 2013. Their debut studio album Cellar Door: Terminus ut Exordium was released on August 12, 2014. The Underachievers released their second official album Evermore: The Art of Duality on September 25, 2015. Their third album, Renaissance was released on May 19, 2017. They released After the Rain on November 9, 2018, and Lords Of Flatbush 3 on June 21, 2019.

== History ==
=== 2007–2010: Early career ===
Marlon Fung (Issa Gold) and Akeem Joseph (AK) grew up just a few blocks from each other in Flatbush. The duo first met in 2007, after AK's friend brought Issa to his house one day to smoke cannabis, where they clicked instantly and discussed psychedelic drugs, which they would later do together along with fellow Brooklyn rappers Meechy Darko and Zombie Juice, two of the Flatbush Zombies. Ak once quoted in his song, Really Got It, that "He has the cheese like some nachos."

=== 2011–2012: Career beginnings, signing to Brainfeeder ===
AK began rapping at the age of eleven, later on in high school he would work under the stage name The Underachiever. Issa Gold started rapping much later, not taking it seriously until around late 2011. The duo then began making music together under the name "The Underachievers" after a producer pushed them to work together, which resulted in them forming the group. Issa explained the name saying, "I feel like the things that we do could be considered underachieving, like we smoke pot. People would probably meet us at first and be like, They're probably just potheads. And then they'll talk to me, or talk to AK, and be like, 'alright, they're intelligent.' So it's just a flip on that. Like, The Underachievers, even though technically we're doing underachiever things, we're bringing positive energy."

In May 2012, they released their first music video for the song "So Devilish". Following the videos release they began gaining attention quickly, with their second officially released song "Gold Soul Theory" getting played on BBC Radio in August 2012, even though they had yet to sign a recording contract. Their music was also passed on to record producer Flying Lotus, who the following day flew them out to Los Angeles to meet them the day after they talked for the first time. After they met a few times and performed a few shows for him, he signed them to his Brainfeeder record label. Flying Lotus said he already wanted to sign the duo after listening to one song for only 20 seconds. Around the same time they signed they released their third music video for "Herb Shuttles", which has gotten over seventeen million views on YouTube. Around mid-2012, The Underachievers, Pro Era and Flatbush Zombies formed the New York hip-hop supergroup Beast Coast.

=== 2013: Indigoism and Lords of Flatbush ===
The duo released their first official mixtape Indigoism on February 1, 2013, via Flying Lotus' Brainfeeder record label. Indigoism featured psychedelic lyrics, allusions to the third eye and spirituality. The mixtape was met with very positive reviews from music critics upon its release, including by BBC. On March 13, 2013, The Underachievers released "No Religion", their first collaboration with Flatbush Zombies. Following the release of Indigoism they toured North America and Australia with Joey Badass, Pro Era and Flatbush Zombies from March 21 until April 20, 2013. On July 19, 2013, Indigoism was released to iTunes for retail sale.

On August 20, 2013, they released the first song from their second mixtape Lords of Flatbush, "Leaving Scraps". The following day they released their first retail single "The Proclamation" to iTunes. On August 29, 2013, The Underachievers released Lords of Flatbush, a nine track mixtape featuring production primarily by Lex Luger, along with Flatbush Zombie's Erick Arc Elliot and EFF.DOPE. Issa Gold explained the mixtape saying, "This tape is mostly bangers. All the lyrical conscious expanding knowledge filled magical triple optic shit will have to wait for the upcoming album." Lords of Flatbush was also met with positive critical reception. Stereogum named Lords of Flatbush their mixtape of the week the week of its release. XXL gave the mixtape a 4 out of 5 saying, "This project from The Underachievers may not be as deep and reflective as Indigoism, but it has its high points and serves as a step forward with the group. With a captivating performance in the final half of the tape, the Lords of Flatbush will surely have fans on the edge of their seat for their upcoming album." On September 14, 2013, they released the music video for "N.A.S.A."

=== 2013–present: Cellar Door: Terminus Ut Exordium, Evermore: The Art of Duality and Renaissance ===
From October 17, through November 30, 2013, The Underachievers toured with Joey Badass, Pro Era, Ab-Soul, and Chevy Woods, among others on the fourth annual "The Smokers Club Tour". On November 19, 2013, Issa Gold confirmed that The Underachievers would be releasing their debut album The Cellar Door in early 2014. He also revealed that they would begin The Cellar Door Tour in April 2014. Then in December 2013, The Underachievers were featured on Talib Kweli's sixth studio album Gravitas, on the song "New Leaders".

On January 28, 2014, Issa Gold updated saying that the album would be released by April 2014, however, it was eventually pushed back to August 12, 2014 now retitled Cellar Door: Terminus Ut Exordium.

The Underachievers released Cellar Door: Terminus Ut Exordium after mixtape releases from Issa Gold and AK, respectively. Issa Gold released his mixtape, Conversations with a Butterfly and AK released his mixtape, Blessings in the Gray to help build hype for their new album. Shortly after the album dropped, The Underachievers announced a two-month tour with fellow "Beast Coast" members The Flatbush Zombies, as Clockwork Indigo. This tour will be named Electric Koolaid Experience

On July 8, they announced that their upcoming project will be titled "Evermore - The Art of Duality", alongside an accompanying World Tour. The album's first single "Take Your Place" was released on July 10. The album was released on September 25, 2015.

On February 23, 2016, the line up for hip-hop artists at the 2016 Osheaga Music Festival were announced; the Underachievers were one of the acts.

On May 15, 2016, The Underachievers released a mixtape titled It Happened In Flatbush. The mixtape was released after Issa Gold tweeted that he would release the mixtape if one of his tweets reached 5,000 retweets. Within a couple of hours, the mixtape was released on Soundcloud.

On January 30, 2017, The Underachievers collaborated with House/Techno artist and DJ Barclay Crenshaw on the song titled "Artifacts". On Feb 3, 2017, The Underachievers released the first single "Gotham Nights" for their new studio album named Renaissance. On February 8, 2017, The Underachievers released the second single, "Cobra Clutch". On March 17, 2017, the single Final Destination was released. On March 27, 2017, The Underachievers released the third single "Head Right". The album Renaissance was released on May 19, 2017.

== Musical style and influence ==
Their musical style is based around old school New York hip-hop and psychedelic hip-hop. Psychedelic drugs such as LSD and psilocybin mushrooms have a significant effect on their musical style. Issa Gold credits Lupe Fiasco and Kanye West as his greatest musical influences, whereas AK cites rappers from the 90's, such as Nas, as influences. The group also significantly listens to other genres of music, with Gold saying his favorite artist is John Mayer.

Issa also includes artists like Fleet Foxes, The Lumineers, Freddie Gibbs and more.

== Personal life ==
Issa's family is from Guyana and his father is half-Chinese. AK's family is originally from Trinidad. His father is a corrections officer.

Issa was childhood friends with Zombie Juice of the Flatbush Zombies, as they grew up in the same building in Flatbush, Brooklyn. He also has known Meechy Darko, also of the Flatbush Zombies, since they were 12 years old. He did acid for the first time at the age of fourteen. Both members of The Underachievers are friends with the members of Flatbush Zombies and Pro Era.

== Discography ==
=== Studio albums ===
List of albums, with selected chart positions
Title	Album details	Peak chart positions			
Title	Album details	US	US R&B/HH	US Rap	US Ind. Albums
Cellar Door: Terminus ut Exordium	Release date: August 12, 2014; Label: RPM MSC Distribution; Format: CD, digital download	86	16	11	—
Evermore: The Art of Duality	Release date: September 25, 2015; Label: RPM MSC Distribution; Format: CD, digital download	105	10	9	—
Renaissance	Release date: May 19, 2017; Label: RPM MSC Distribution; Format: CD, digital download	—	—	—	34
After the Rain	Release date: November 9, 2018; Label: Slang Music; Format: Digital download	—	—	—	—
Homecoming	Release date: April 18, 2025; Label: Slang Music; Format: Streaming, digital download	—	—	—	—
"—" denotes a title that did not chart, or was not released in that territory.

=== EPs ===
List of extended-plays, with selected details
Title	Album details
Clockwork Indigo (with Flatbush Zombies) (as Clockwork Indigo)	Released: October 17, 2014; Format: Digital download; Label: Self-released

=== Mixtapes ===
Year	Album details
2013	Indigoism: Release date: February 1, 2013; Label: Brainfeeder
2013	The Lords of Flatbush: Release date: August 29, 2013; Label: Elevated Nations, RPM MSC Distribution, Brainfeeder
2016	It Happened In Flatbush: Release date: May 15, 2016; Label: Brainfeeder, RPM MSC Distribution
2019	Lords of Flatbush 3: Release date: June 21, 2019; Label: Slang Music
