= Mr. Muthafuckin' eXquire =

American rapper (born 1986)

- Also known as: eXquire; Mr. MFN eXquire
- Born: Hugh Anthony Allison; 1986 (age 39–40); New York City, New York, U.S.
- Genre: Hip-hop
- Occupation: Rapper
- Years active: 2008–present
- Labels: Mishka NYC; Universal Republic; Chocolate Rabbit; Soulspazm; EVERYTHING IZ Y.O.U

Hugh Anthony Allison (born 1986), better known by his stage name Mr. Muthafuckin' eXquire (often censored as Mr. MFN eXquire or simply eXquire), is an American rapper. Born and raised in Brooklyn, he debuted with the release of his first mixtape, The Big Fat Kill, in 2008. Allison would follow-up with what is considered to be his breakout project, the mixtape Lost in Translation, released by Mishka NYC in 2011. He signed his first major-label record deal with Universal Republic Records, in 2012, which he subsequently left. In 2017, with the release of Allison's fourth EP Brainiac, he launched Chocolate Rabbit, his own record label imprint. His self-titled debut studio album was independently released in 2019.

== Early life ==
Hugh Anthony Allison was born in the Brooklyn borough of New York City in 1986. He grew up in Brooklyn's Crown Heights neighborhood.

== Career ==
In 2008, eXquire released his first full-length project, a mixtape titled The Big Fat Kill. He first began gaining major recognition in June 2011, when he released the music video for a song titled "Huzzah". On September 11, 2011, eXquire released his second mixtape, titled Lost in Translation, which features "Huzzah". The mixtape, which was released on Mishka NYC, includes 18-tracks, one of them being the remix to "Huzzah", titled "The Last Huzzah". The remix, which features guest verses from fellow American rappers Despot, Heems, Kool A.D., Danny Brown and El-P, was called one of the best songs of 2011 by Rolling Stone. eXquire's third mixtape, titled Merry eXmas & Suck My Dick, was released on December 25, 2011.

On March 15, 2012, it was announced eXquire had signed a recording contract with Universal Republic Records. In November 2012, eXquire released his first major record label project, an EP titled Power & Passion, on Universal Republic. In May 2013, eXquire announced he would release a new project titled Kismet and premiered a song titled "Illest Niggaz Breathin'". In June 2013, he released a 16-track mixtape titled Kismet, which was recorded mostly in Woodstock, New York. In October 2013, eXquire re-released Kismet, re-titling it Kismet: Blue Edition and adding 16 tracks. On October 7, 2013, Universal Republic released eXquire from his contract.

On January 7, 2015, eXquire released Merry eXmas & SMD 2, the sequel to his 2011 Christmas mixtape. On January 8, 2015, eXquire released another mixtape, this one titled Live from the Danger Room, which is compiled of unreleased tracks. On October 8, 2015, eXquire released his second EP, titled Live Forever. On July 12, 2019, eXquire released his self-titled debut studio album.

== Style and influences ==
eXquire has stated that the capital X in his stage name derives from both DMX and Malcolm X.

== Discography ==
=== Studio albums ===
List of studio albums
| Title | Details |
|---|---|
| Mr. Muthafuckin' eXquire | Released: July 12, 2019; Label: Chocolate Rabbit, Soulspazm; Format: Digital download, streaming |
| Confessions of a Sex Addict | Released: June 16, 2020; Label: Chocolate Rabbit; Format: Digital Download |
| Vol. 1: I Love Y.O.U. Cuz Y.O.U Ugly | Released: September 30, 2022; Label: EVERYTHING IZ Y.O.U; Format: Digital Download |

=== EPs ===
List of extended plays, with year released
| Title | Details |
|---|---|
| Cheap Thrills | Released: August 17, 2009; Label: Self-released; Format: Digital download |
| Power & Passion | Released: November 6, 2012; Label: Universal Republic; Format: Digital download |
| Live Forever | Released: October 8, 2015; Label: Self-released; Format: Digital download |
| Brainiac | Released: July 28, 2017; Label: Chocolate Rabbit; Format: Digital download |

=== Mixtapes ===
List of mixtapes, with year released
| Title | Details |
|---|---|
| The Big Fat Kill | Released: June 10, 2008; Label: Self-released; Format: Digital download |
| Lost in Translation | Released: September 11, 2011; Label: Mishka NYC; Format: Digital download |
| Kismet | Released: June 4, 2013; Label: Self-released; Format: Digital download |
| Kismet: Blue Edition | Released: October 3, 2013; Label: Self-released; Format: Digital download |

=== Mixtapes with occasional, live & unreleased materials ===
| Title | Details |
|---|---|
| Merry eXmas & Suck My Dick | Released: December 25, 2011; Label: Self-released; Format: Digital download |
| The Man in the High Castle | Released: October 19, 2012; Label: Self-released; Format: Digital download |
| Merry eXmas & SMD 2 | Released: January 7, 2015; Label: Self-released; Format: Digital download |
| Live from the Danger Room | Released: January 8, 2015; Label: Self-released; Format: Digital download |
| Merry eXmas 3 | Released: December 22, 2017; Label: Chocolate Rabbit; Format: Digital download |
| Secret Legend Vol. 1 | Released: September 17, 2020; Label: Self-released; Format: Digital download |
| Letting Go of you for Y.O.U | Released: November 5, 2021; Label: Self-released; Format: Digital download |

=== Singles ===
- "360 WAV" (2018)
- "Somebody's Sleeping in My Bed" (2019)
- "Fck Boy!" (2019)
- "Bootlicker (Burn Baby Burn)" (2020)
- "Black Mirror" (produced by Madlib) (2020)
- "THE DOORWAY (UNFINISHED)" (produced by The Custodian Of Records) (2021)
- "Namaste" (produced by KRILL) (2023)
- "The Letter P Freestyle (Sean Price, MF DOOM, Kay Slay Tribute)" (2023)
- "Dot vs Dilla" (2023)

=== Guest appearances ===
List of non-single guest appearances, with other performing artists, showing year released and album name
| Title | Year | Other performer(s) | Album |
|---|---|---|---|
| "You Have to Ride the Wave" | 2012 | Himanshu, Danny Brown | Nehru Jackets |
| "Oh Hail No" | 2012 | El-P, Danny Brown | Cancer 4 Cure |
| "Flowers" | 2012 | Prince Samo, Remy Banks, Goldie Glo, Maachew Bentley | Street Viceroy |
| "Pt. 7: The Explanation" | 2012 | The Alchemist | Russian Roulette |
| "Coogi" | 2012 | Fashawn | Champagne & Styrofoam Cups |
| "B.N.E. Remix" | 2013 | Alexander Spit, E-40 | A Breathtaking Trip to That Otherside |
| "Poisonous Thoughts" | 2013 | Czarface | Czarface |
| "Rock Steady" | 2013 | Diplo, Action Bronson, Riff Raff, Nicky da B | Revolution EP |
| "BKNY (Remix)" | 2013 | Fat Tony, MeLo-X, Tom Cruz | —N/a |
| "Tight" | 2014 | Kool A.D., Lakutis | Word O.K. |
| "Still" | 2014 | Michael Christmas | Is This Art? |
| "Pretty Bodies" | 2016 | YC the Cynic | The Farewell Tape |
| "Warrior Thing" | 2016 | Little Shalimar | Rubble Kings Soundtrack |
| "Same Damn Thing" | 2016 | Little Shalimar, Boldy James, Ghostface Killah | Rubble Kings Soundtrack |

== See also ==
- List of hip-hop musicians
- List of people from Brooklyn
- Music of New York City
