= Late Knight Special =

Studio album by Kirk Knight
- Released: October 30, 2015
- Recorded: 2015
- Genre: East Coast hip hop
- Length: 45:58
- Label: Pro Era; Cinematic
- Producer: Kirk Knight; THEMpeople; Thundercat

Kirk Knight chronology
Late Knight Special (2015)	Black Noise (2017)

Singles from Late Knight Special
- 1. "Knight Time" Released: August 28, 2015; 2. "Dead Friends" Released: September 29, 2015

Late Knight Special is the debut album by American rapper and record producer Kirk Knight. It was released on October 30, 2015, by Cinematic Music Group.

== Background ==
The album features guest appearances by fellow Pro Era member Joey Bada$$, as well as The Mind, Mick Jenkins, Noname and Thundercat. The album is solely produced by Kirk Knight, alongside THEMpeople, with bass arrangement by Thundercat. The project debuts at number 33 on the Top R&B/Hip-Hop Albums chart and number 10 at Billboard's Heatseekers Albums.

== Critical reception ==
Professional ratings
Review scores
Source	Rating
HipHopDX	4.5/5 stars
NPR	Positive
Pitchfork	6.4/10.0

The album received mostly positive reviews, with HipHopDX calling the album "a sonic oeuvre of contemporary East Coast Hip Hop rooted in tradition, yet stunningly present." HipHopDX rated it the best R&B/Hip Hop album of October, giving it a 4.5/5 rating.

== Track listing ==
No.	Title	Writer(s)	Producer(s)	Length
1.	"Start Running"	Kirlan Labarrie	Kirk Knight	3:19
2.	"Heaven Is for Real"	Labarrie; T'nah Apex	Kirk Knight	4:06
3.	"Brokeland"	Labarrie	Kirk Knight	2:35
4.	"5 Minutes" (featuring Joey Bada$$)	Labarrie; Jo-Vaughn Scott	Kirk Knight	3:27
5.	"Knight Time"	Labarrie	Kirk Knight	3:46
6.	"One Knight" (featuring The Mind)	Labarrie	Kirk Knight; THEMpeople	4:21
7.	"Scorpio"	Labarrie	Kirk Knight	3:30
8.	"Down"	Labarrie	Kirk Knight	3:08
9.	"I Know" (featuring Mick Jenkins)	Labarrie; Jayson Jenkins	Kirk Knight	4:19
10.	"Dead Friends" (featuring Noname and Thundercat)	Labarrie; Fatimah Warner; Stephen Bruner	Kirk Knight; Thundercat	3:33
11.	"The Future" (featuring The Mind)	Labarrie	Kirk Knight; THEMpeople	5:09
12.	"All for Nothing"	Labarrie	Kirk Knight	4:44
Total length:				45:58

Notes

- "Heaven Is for Real" features uncredited vocals from T'nah Apex.
