= Action Bronson discography =

- Bronson performing in 2013
- Studio albums: 9
- EPs: 3
- Singles: 39
- Mixtapes: 4
- Guest appearances: 102

The discography of Action Bronson, an American rapper from Flushing, Queens, New York, consists of eight studio albums, one collaborative album, three extended plays (EPs), four mixtapes and thirty-nine singles (including fifteen as a featured artist).

== Studio albums ==
List of albums, with selected chart positions
Title	Album details	Peak chart positions						
Title	Album details	US	US R&B	US Rap	AUS	CAN	NZ	SWI
Dr. Lecter	Released: March 15, 2011; Label: Fine Fabric Delegates; Format: Digital download	—	—	—	—	—	—	—
Well-Done (with Statik Selektah)	Released: November 22, 2011; Label: Switchblade, DCide; Format: CD, LP, digital download	—	—	—	—	—	—	—
Mr. Wonderful	Released: March 23, 2015; Label: Atlantic, Vice; Format: CD, LP, digital download	7	3	2	26	7	18	23
Blue Chips 7000	Released: August 25, 2017; Label: Atlantic, Vice; Format: CD, digital download	53	31	25	94	—	— (Note: Blue Chips 7000 did not enter the NZ Top 40 Albums Chart, but peaked at number two on the NZ Heatseekers Albums Chart.)	90
White Bronco	Released: November 2, 2018; Label: Empire; Format: CD, LP, digital download	—	—	—	—	—	—	—
Only for Dolphins	Released: September 25, 2020; Label: Loma Vista, Concord; Format: CD, LP, cassette, digital download	—	—	—	—	—	—	—
Cocodrillo Turbo	Released: April 29, 2022; Label: Loma Vista, Concord; Format: CD, LP, cassette, digital download	—	—	—	—	—	—	—
Johann Sebastian Bachlava the Doctor	Released: July 11, 2024; Label: Self-released; Format: LP, digital download	—	—	—	—	—	—	—
Planet Frog	Released: May 8, 2026; Label: Self-released; Format: LP, digital download	—	—	—	—	—	—	—
"—" denotes a title that did not chart, or was not released in that territory.

== EPs ==
List of extended plays, with selected chart positions
Title	EP details	Peak chart positions		
Title	EP details	US	US R&B	US Rap
The Program (with Don Producci)	Released: April 3, 2011; Label: Self-released; Format: Digital download	—	—	—
Saaab Stories (with Harry Fraud)	Released: June 11, 2013; Label: Atlantic, Vice; Format: Digital download	63	9	6
Lamb Over Rice (with The Alchemist)	Released: November 22, 2019; Label: ALC; Format: Digital download	—	—	—
"—" denotes a title that did not chart, or was not released in that territory.

== Mixtapes ==
List of mixtapes, with year released
Title	Album details
Bon Appetit ..... Bitch	Released: January 4, 2011; Label: J-LOVE E.N.T.; Format: Digital download
Blue Chips (with Party Supplies)	Released: March 12, 2012; Label: Self-released; Format: Digital download
Rare Chandeliers (with The Alchemist)	Released: November 15, 2012; Label: Self-released; Format: Digital download
Blue Chips 2 (with Party Supplies)	Released: November 1, 2013; Label: Self-released; Format: Digital download

== Singles ==
=== As lead artist ===
List of singles, with selected chart positions and certifications, showing year released and album name
Title	Year	Peak chart positions			Certifications	Album
Title	Year	US	US R&B	US Rap	Certifications	Album
"Imported Goods"	2010	—	—	—		Bon Appetit ..... Bitch
"Cocoa Butter" (with Statik Selektah, featuring Nina Sky)	2011	—	—	—		Well-Done
"Muslim Wedding"	2011	—	—	—		non-album singles
"Hot Shots Part Deux" (with Riff Raff and Dana Coppafeel)	2012	—	—	—		non-album singles
"Octopussy Tentacles" (with Concise Kilgore)	2012	—	—	—		non-album singles
"Northern Lights" (with Task Rok)	2013	—	—	—		non-album singles
"Strictly 4 My Jeeps"	2013	—	—	—		Saaab Stories
"Live from Kissena Blvd" (featuring Statik Selektah)	2013	—	—	—		Who You Mad At? Me or Yourself?
"Grammy" (with Riff Raff)	2014	—	—	—		non-album single
"Easy Rider"	2014	—	—	—		Mr. Wonderful
"Actin Crazy"	2015	—	—	—		Mr. Wonderful
"Terry"	2015	—	—	—		Mr. Wonderful
"Baby Blue" (featuring Chance the Rapper)	2015	91	30	21	RIAA: Gold; RMNZ: Gold	Mr. Wonderful
"Durag vs. Headband" (featuring Big Body Bes)	2016	—	—	—		Blue Chips 7000
"Let Me Breathe"	2017	—	—	—		Blue Chips 7000
"The Chairman's Intent"	2017	—	—	—		Blue Chips 7000
"White Bronco"	2018	—	—	—		White Bronco
"Prince Charming"	2018	—	—	—		White Bronco
"Latin Grammys"	2020	—	—	—		Only for Dolphins
"Golden Eye"	2020	—	—	—		Only for Dolphins
"Subzero"	2022	—	—	—		Cocodrillo Turbo
"Nourish a Thug"	2024	—	—	—		Johann Sebastian Bachlava the Doctor
"Sega"	2024	—	—	—		Johann Sebastian Bachlava the Doctor
"Triceratops" (featuring Lil Yachty and Paul Wall)	2026	—	—	—		Planet Frog
"—" denotes a recording that did not chart or was not released in that territory.

=== As featured artist ===
List of singles as featured artist, showing year released and album name
Title	Year	Album
"Batmobile" (Joke featuring Action Bronson and Riski Metekson)	2011	Prêt pour l'argent 1.5
"Marijuana Thon" (J-Love featuring Action Bronson, Jay Steele and Take-It)	2011	non-album singles
"Bronsonmania Deluxe" (P.F. Cuttin featuring Action Bronson)	2011	non-album singles
"Drugs" (J-Love featuring Action Bronson)	2012	non-album singles
"Hookers" (Metabeats featuring Action Bronson)	2012	non-album singles
"Elimination Chamber" (Domo Genesis and Alchemist featuring Earl Sweatshirt, Vince Staples and Action Bronson)	2012	non-album singles
"1000 Lbs." (P.F. Cuttin and Labba featuring Action Bronson and Ike Eyes)	2012	non-album singles
"Three Course Meal" (Probcause featuring Action Bronson and Chance the Rapper)	2012	The Recipe Vol. 2
"Your Honor" (Fat Joe featuring Action Bronson)	2013	The Darkside III
"Gold Days" (Mr. Probz featuring Action Bronson)	2013	The Treatment
"Rookies of the Future" (The Alchemist featuring Riff Raff and Action Bronson)	2014	non-album single
"The Godfather 4" (Curren$y featuring Action Bronson)	2014	The Drive In Theatre
"Park Avenue (Rolodex Propaganda)" (AG Da Coroner featuring Action Bronson and Roc Marciano)	2016	Sip the Nectar
"Uncle Junior" (John Sparkz and Harry Fraud featuring Jim Jones and Action Bronson)	2021	
"Szechuan Capital" (Meyhem Lauren, DJ Muggs and Madlib featuring Action Bronson)	2023	Champagne for Breakfast

== Other charted songs ==
List of songs, with selected chart positions, showing year released and album name
Title	Year	Peak chart positions			Album	Certifications
Title	Year	US	US R&B	US Rap	Album	Certifications
"1 Train" (ASAP Rocky featuring Kendrick Lamar, Joey Bada$$, Yelawolf, Danny Brown, Action Bronson and Big K.R.I.T.)	2013	103	31	25	LONG.LIVE.A$AP	RIAA: Gold; RMNZ: Gold
"—" denotes a recording that did not chart or was not released in that territory.

== Guest appearances ==
List of non-single guest appearances, with other performing artists, showing year released and album name
Title	Year	Other artist(s)	Album
"Glaciers"	2010	Meyhem Lauren, Shaz One	Clarified Butter
"Fish"	2010	Meyhem Lauren, Science	Clarified Butter
"Steamed Broccoli"	2010	Meyhem Lauren, Shaz One, Fi-Lo	Clarified Butter
"Money Is Reality"	2010	Statik Selektah, Termanology	The Evening News EP
"All I Think About"	2011	Apathy	Honkey Kong
"Never A Dull Moment"	2011	Statik Selektah, Termanology, Bun B	Population Control
"The Geniva Conference"	2011	Meyhem Lauren, Bags, Science, Animal, Jay Steele	Self Induced Illness
"Meteor Hammer"	2011	Wu-Tang Clan, Termanology	Legendary Weapons
"Jordan vs. Bird"	2011	Maffew Ragazino	Rhyme Pays
"Roadhouse"	2011	Marq Spekt, Kno	MacheteVision
"Choices"	2011	Asher Roth	Pabst & Jazz
"Ivory Coast Crime Scene"	2011	The Kid Daytona	The Interlude II
"Big, Bad & Dangerous"	2011	Smoke DZA	Sweet Baby Kushed God
"Lose Control"	2011	Rite Hook	Draw You In
"Yo What's Good New York"	2012	Heems	Nehru Jackets
"Mazel Tov"	2012	N.O.R.E.	Crack On Steroids
"Riggs & Murtaugh"	2012	Reks	Straight, No Chaser
"The Main Event"	2012	J57, Meyhem Lauren, Maffew Ragazino, Rasheed Campbell, DJ Brace	2057 EP
"The Daily News"	2012	Domo Genesis, The Alchemist, SpaceGhostPurrp, Earl Sweatshirt	No Idols
"MARS"	2012	Large Professor, Cormega, Roc Marciano, Saigon	Professor @ Large
"Decisions Over Veal Orloff"	2012	The Alchemist	Russian Roulette
"Turnbuckle Music"	2012	Smoke DZA	Rugby Thompson
"Up Top Game"	2012	Stu Cat, Phil Ade	Beware Of The Cat
"Special Effects"	2012	Meyhem Lauren, Heems	Respect The Fly Shit
"Pan Seared Tilapia"	2012	Meyhem Lauren, AG Da Coroner, Despot	Respect The Fly Shit
"Peruvian Deserts"	2012	Meyhem Lauren, Roc Marciano	Respect The Fly Shit
"Thousand Dollar Gym Shoes"	2012	Meyhem Lauren	Mandatory Brunch Meetings
"Stewed Rabo"	2012	Meyhem Lauren, AG Da Coroner	Mandatory Brunch Meetings
"Mean"	2012	French Montana	Mac & Cheese 3
"1 Train"	2013	ASAP Rocky, Kendrick Lamar, Joey Bada$$, Danny Brown, Yelawolf, Big K.R.I.T.	Long. Live. ASAP
"It's Raw"	2013	Inspectah Deck, 7L & Esoteric	Czarface
"Czardi Gras"	2013	Czarface	—N/a
"Put It In Your Mouth" (Remix)	2013	Hologram	—N/a
"Pro Create"	2013	Jared Evan & Statik Selektah	Boom Bap & Blues
"Marvelous"	2013	Eddie B	Horsepower
"Morey Boogie Boards"	2013	Harry Fraud	Adrift
"The One"	2013	Prodigy	Albert Einstein
"NaNa"	2013	Chance the Rapper	Acid Rap
"Get It In"	2013	Kyle Rapps	SUB
"Icky Woods"	2013	Alex Wiley	—N/a
"Beyond A Reasonable Doubt"	2013	Joey Bada$$	XXL 2013's Freshmen Class: The Mixtape
"All Quotes"	2013	Maundz	Zero
"The Spark"	2013	Statik Selektah, Joey Bada$$, Mike Posner	Extended Play
"Reloaded"	2013	Statik Selektah, Pain In Da Ass, Big Body Bes, Termanology, Tony Touch	Extended Play
"Red Dot Music"	2013	Mac Miller	Watching Movies with the Sound Off
"Live Blasphemous"	2013	Joey Fatts	Chipper Jones Vol. 2
"Sugar Mama"	2013	Leaf	—N/a
"Instruction Manuals"	2013	A$AP Ferg, RiFF RaFF	—N/a
"A Queen's Thing"	2013	Tony Touch, Kool G Rap	The Piece Maker 3: Return of the 50 MCs
"Camp Registration"	2013	The Alchemist, Step Brothers, Blu, Domo Genesis	SSUR
"1010 Wins"	2013	The Alchemist, Domo Genesis, Meyhem Lauren, Roc Marciano, Despot	SSUR
"Take My Turn"	2013	Termanology, Jared Evan	G.O.Y.A. (Gunz Or Yay Available)
"Club Soda"	2013	Flatbush ZOMBiES	BetterOffDEAD
"Traction"	2013	Boldy James	My 1st Chemistry Set
"456"	2013	Roc Marciano	Marci Beaucoup
"Sincerely Antique"	2013	Roc Marciano, Willy The Kid	The Pimpire Strikes Back
"Velvet Cape"	2013	Roc Marciano, Meyhem Lauren	The Pimpire Strikes Back
"Pool Hall Hustler"	2013	The Alchemist, Roc Marciano	The Cutting Room Floor 3
"Rock Steady"	2013	Diplo, Mr. Muthafuckin' eXquire, Riff Raff, Nicky da B	Revolution EP
"Mums In The Garage"	2014	Step Brothers	Lord Steppington
"Godfather Four"	2014	Curren$y	The Drive-In Theatre
"Don't Do That"	2014	N.O.R.E., Cityboy Dee	Resource Room
"TLC"	2014	A$ton Matthews, Flatbush ZOMBiES	A$ton 3:16
"100 MPH"	2014	Meyhem Lauren, Buckwild	Silk Pyramids
"Number One"	2014	Mr. Flash, Cities Aviv, Oh No	Sonic Crusader
"Stigmata"	2014	Ab-Soul, Asaad	These Days...
"The Imperial"	2014	Statik Selektah, Royce da 5'9", Black Thought	What Goes Around
"Long Time"	2014	Statik Selektah	What Goes Around
"Hallelujah"	2014	Dilated Peoples, Fashawn, Rapsody, Domo Genesis, Vinnie Paz	Directors of Photography
"Rookies of the Future"	2014	RiFF RaFF	—N/a
"Live from the Villa"	2014	A-Villa, Roc Marciano, Willie The Kid	Carry on Tradition
"Knicks (Remix)"	2014	Freddie Gibbs, Madlib, Joey Bada$$, Ransom	Knicks Remix EP
"Bad News"	2014	Danny Brown	Grand Theft Auto V (soundtrack)
"Run Up On Ya"	2015	Joey Bada$$, Elle Varner	B4.Da.$$
"Warlord Leather"	2015	The Alchemist, Earl Sweatshirt	—N/a
"Go Time"	2015	Ea$y Money	The Motive of Nearly Everybody, Yo
"Beautiful Life"	2015	Statik Selektah, Joey Bada$$	Lucky 7
"All You Need"	2015	Statik Selektah, Ab-Soul, Elle Varner	Lucky 7
"Voodoo"	2015	The Alchemist	Retarded Alligator Beats
"What About the Rest of Us"	2015	Joey Bada$$, Rico Love	Southpaw: Original Motion Picture Soundtrack
"Driving Gloves"	2015	Gangrene	You Disgust Me
"Dudley Boyz"	2016	Westside Gunn	FLYGOD
"Inspiration"	2016	Curren$y & The Alchemist	The Carrollton Heist
"Bonus Round"	2016	Meyhem Lauren, Roc Marciano, Big Body Bes	Piatto D'Oro
"Garlic and Oil"	2016	Meyhem Lauren	Piatto D'Oro
"Dragon V.S. Wolf"	2016	Meyhem Lauren	Piatto D'Oro
"Standing in the Rain"	2016	Dan Auerbach, Mark Ronson	Suicide Squad: The Album
"Shea Stadium"	2017	Meyhem Lauren, DJ Muggs	Gems From The Equinox
"Szechuan Peppercorns"	2017	Meyhem Lauren, DJ Muggs, Hologram	Gems From The Equinox
"Tension"	2017	Meyhem Lauren, DJ Muggs, B-Real	Gems From The Equinox
"Watching Myself"	2017	Statik Selektah	8
"The Hopeless Romantic"	2018	The Alchemist	Lunch Meat EP
"Scarab 38"	2018	Curren$y, Harry Fraud	The Marina EP
"Tropical Storm Lenny"	2019	The Alchemist	Yacht Rock 2
"I Hate Everything"	2020	The Alchemist	The Food Villian
"In my lifetime"	2022	Logic	Vinyl Days
"Black Pinot"	2022	Meyhem Lauren, Daringer	Black Vladimir
"The Hopeless Romantic"	2022	The Alchemist	The Alchemist Sandwich
"Solid Plan"	2023	Larry June, The Alchemist	The Great Escape
"Vertigo"	2023	The Alchemist	Flying High, Part 2
"Minnesota Fats"	2024	The Alchemist, Big Body Bes	The Genuine Articulate

== Production discography ==
=== 2011 ===
Action Bronson - Bon Appetit..... Bitch!!!!!

- 4. "Shiraz"
- 10. "Mofongo" (featuring Shaz One)

=== 2020 ===
Action Bronson - Only For Dolphins

- 1. "Capoeira" (featuring Yung Mehico)
- 5. "Mongolia" (featuring Hologram and Meyhem Lauren)

=== 2022 ===
Action Bronson - Cocodrillo Turbo

- 2. "Tongpo" (featuring Conway the Machine)
- 8. "Zambezi" (featuring Roc Marciano)

=== 2024 ===
Action Bronson - JOHANN SEBASTIAN BACHLAVA THE DOCTOR

- 5. "SALVAJE"
- 6. "HOGAN" (featuring Meyhem Lauren)
- 10. "SHADOW REALM"

=== 2026 ===
Action Bronson - Planet Frog

- 1. "PLANET FROG"
- 2. "LEBRON HENNESSY" (featuring Julian Love and Yung Mehico)
- 3. "OLYMPIC VINCE CARTER"
- 4. "VHS"
- 5. "TRICERATOPS" (featuring Lil Yachty and Paul Wall)
- 6. "PEPPERS" (featuring Roc Marciano)
- 7. "CONDOR"
- 8. "MANDEM" (featuring Meyhem Lauren)
- 9. "MY BLUE HEAVEN"
- 10. "IGUANA"
- 11. "MUTATIONS"
- 12. "CHUTNEY" (featuring Human Growth Hormone)
- 13. "SIMONÉ" (featuring Clovis Ochin)

== Music videos ==
As lead artist
Year	Album	Title	Director	Featured artist
2010	Dr. Lecter	Shiraz	n/c	
2011	Dr. Lecter	Barry Horrowitz	Tom Gould Alexander Richter	
2011	Dr. Lecter	Brunch	Tom Gould Alexander Richter	
2011	Well-Done	Not Enough Words	Tom Gould Alexander Richter	Statik Selektah
2011	Well-Done	Cirque du Soleil	Rik Cordero	Statik Selektah
2012	Rare Chandeliers	The Symbol	Rik Cordero	
2012	Blue Chips	Hookers at the Point	Rik Cordero	Party Supplies
2012		Hot Shots Part Deux	Stan Perry Jr.	Riff Raff, Dana Coppafeel
2012	Blue Chips	Steve Wynn	Rick Cordero	Party Supplies
2013	Saaab Stories	Strictly 4 My Jeeps	Jason Goldwatch	
2014	Mr. Wonderful	Easy Rider	Tom Gould	
2015	Mr. Wonderful	Actin Crazy	n/c	
2015	Mr. Wonderful	Baby Blue	Lil Chri$	Chance The Rapper
2016	Blue Chips 7000	Durag vs Headband	Tom Gould	Big Body Bes
2017	Blue Chips 7000	Let Me Breathe	James Larese	
2017	Blue Chips 7000	The Chairman's Intent	Action Bronson Rik Cordero	
2018	White Bronco	White Bronco	Action Bronson Rik Cordero	
2020	Only For Dolphins	Latin Grammys	VIDEO CONNECTION	
2020	Only For Dolphins	Golden Eye	VIDEO CONNECTION	
2020	Only For Dolphins	Mongolia	Zev Deans	Hologram, Meyhem Lauren
2022	Cocodrillo Turbo	SubZero	James Larese	
2024	JOHANN SEBASTIAN BACHLAVA THE DOCTOR	Nourish A Thug	Sean Kelly	
2024	JOHANN SEBASTIAN BACHLAVA THE DOCTOR	Sega	Sean Kelly	
2024	JOHANN SEBASTIAN BACHLAVA THE DOCTOR	Shadow Realm	Chris Grosso Bernardo Garcia	
2026	Planet Frog	TRICERATOPS	Chris Grosso Andrew Maso Bernardo Garcia	Lil Yachty, Paul Wall
2026	Planet Frog	PEPPERS	Chris Grosso	Roc Marciano

As featured artist
Year	Lead artist	Title	Director	Other featured artist
2011	Meyhem Lauren	Typhoon Rap	Matt Raz Tommy Mas	
2011	Statik Selektah	Never A Dull Moment	Rik Cordero	Termanology, Bun B
2012	Riff Raff	Birds on a Wire	Max Albert	
2012	DJ Yoda	Big Trouble in Little China	LittleGold	Alice Russell
2013	Kyle Rapps	Get It In	Robbie Barclay	
2015	Meyhem Lauren & Buckwild	100 MPH	Meyhem Lauren	
2015	Gangrene	Driving Gloves	Jason Goldwatch	
2015	Statik Selektah	Beautiful Life	Slick Jackson	Joey Bada$$
2023	Larry June & The Alchemist	Solid Plan	Sean Kelly	
2023	The Alchemist	Vertigo	Sean Kelly	
