= Action Bronson =

American rapper (born 1983)

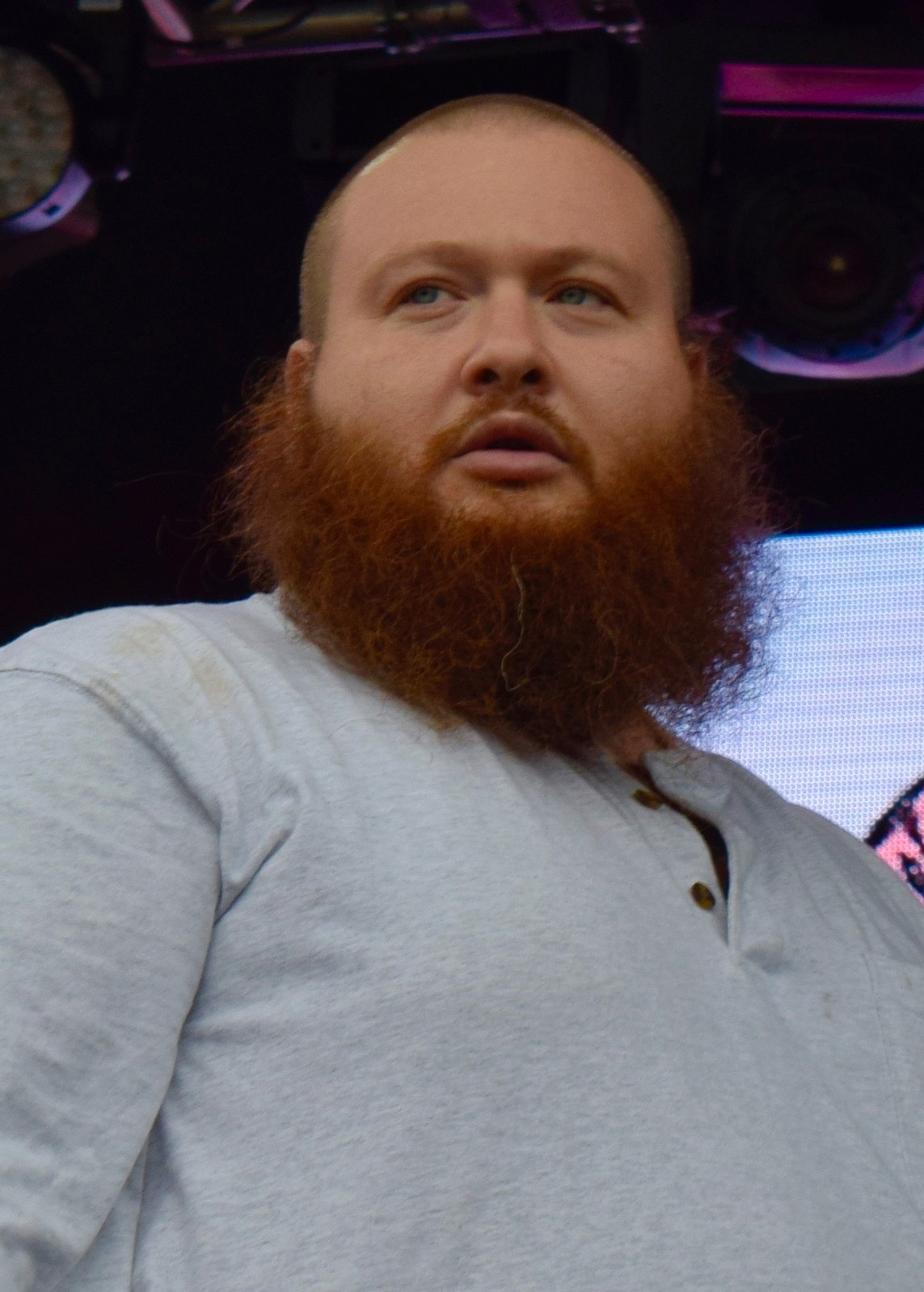
- Bronson performing in 2016
- Born: Ariyan Arslani; December 2, 1983 (age 42); Queens, New York City, U.S.
- Other names: Bam Bam; Bronsoliño; Mr. Baklava
- Occupations: Rapper; songwriter; record producer; chef; television presenter
- Years active: 2008–present
- Television: The Untitled Action Bronson Show; Fuck, That’s Delicious; Traveling the Stars: Action Bronson and Friends Watch Ancient Aliens
- Children: 3
- Musical career
- Genre: East Coast hip-hop
- Labels: Vice; Atlantic; EMPIRE; Loma Vista; Concord
- Website: actionbronson.com

Ariyan Arslani (born December 2, 1983), better known by his stage name Action Bronson, is an American rapper, chef, and television host. Born and raised in Queens, he released his debut mixtape Bon Appetit ..... Bitch!!!!! in January 2011 and independently released his debut album, Dr. Lecter, in March 2011. In August 2012, Arslani signed his first major-label deal with Warner Bros. Records, but was later moved to the Atlantic Records-distributed label Vice Records.

Arslani went on to create two self-released mixtapes, Rare Chandeliers (2012) with American record producer The Alchemist, and Blue Chips 2 (2013) with longtime collaborators Party Supplies, before releasing his major-label debut, an extended play (EP) titled Saaab Stories, with frequent collaborator Harry Fraud, in 2013. He released his major-label debut album, Mr. Wonderful, in March 2015, debuting at number seven on the US Billboard 200 chart.

Aside from his career in music, Arslani hosted The Untitled Action Bronson Show, a talk/variety show, and still hosts his travel program Fuck, That's Delicious, on Viceland. His frequent collaborators and lifelong friends Meyhem Lauren, The Alchemist, and Big Body Bes are regulars on both of his television series. Renowned chefs such as Mario Batali, Andrew Zimmern, Daniel Boulud, Rick Bayless, Grant Achatz, and others have been guests on his television series.

== Biography ==
=== 1983–2010: Early life and career ===
Ariyan Arslani was born in Flushing, Queens, New York City, on December 2, 1983, to an Albanian Muslim father and an American Jewish mother. Growing up he was raised in his father's Muslim tradition. He attended Bayside High School, in Bayside, Queens, and graduated in 2002. Before embarking on a career as a rapper, which was originally just a hobby, Bronson worked as a cook at his father's Mediterranean restaurant in Forest Hills. He hosted his own online cooking show, Action in the Kitchen. After breaking his leg in the kitchen, Bronson concentrated solely on rapping.

=== 2011: Dr. Lecter and Well Done ===
Action Bronson's debut studio album, Dr. Lecter, was independently released by Fine Fabric Delegates on March 15, 2011. The album was produced entirely by New York City-based music producer Tommy Mas. In November of that year, Bronson followed up with Well-Done, a collaborative effort with American hip-hop producer Statik Selektah. On March 12, 2012, he released his second mixtape, titled Blue Chips, with Party Supplies.

=== 2012–2013: Major-label deal and Saaab Stories ===
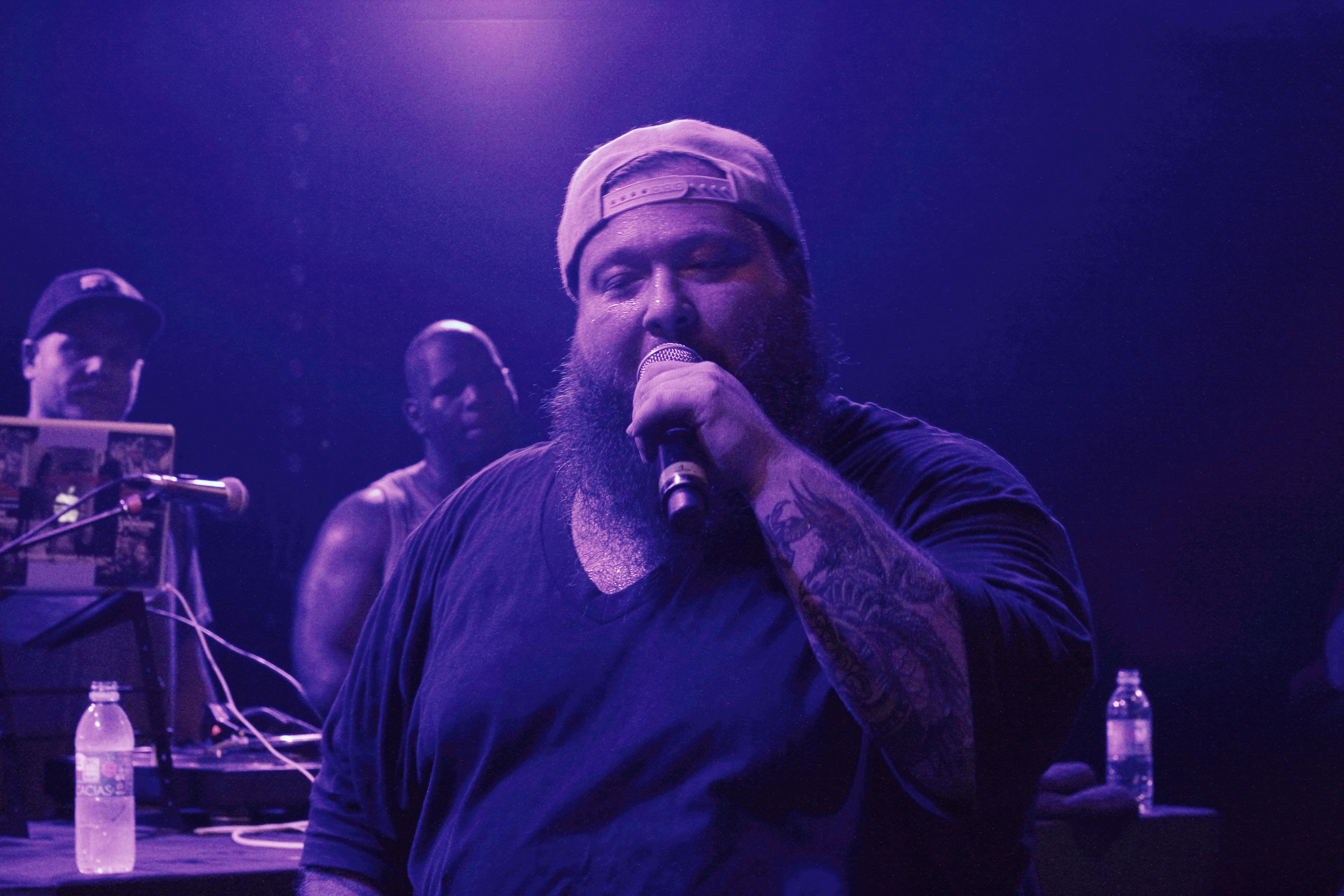
Action Bronson performing in July 2013

In August 2012, it was announced Paul Rosenberg signed Action Bronson to a management deal with Goliath Artists. In the same month, Bronson was featured on Odd Future-rapper Domo Genesis and American hip-hop producer The Alchemist's collaborative album No Idols, on tracks "Elimination Chamber" (featuring Earl Sweatshirt and Vince Staples) and "Daily News" (featuring SpaceGhostPurrp and Earl Sweatshirt). Later that year Action Bronson joined both Warner Bros. Records, via media company VICE, and concert booking agency NUE. On November 15, 2012, Bronson released Rare Chandeliers, a collaborative mixtape with the Alchemist.

In March 2013, Bronson performed at the Coachella Valley Music and Arts Festival and later that month was featured on XXL Magazine's 2013 Freshman Class, a list of up-and-coming rappers. In May 2013, Action Bronson was moved to Atlantic Records, and subsequently released an extended play (EP) titled Saaab Stories, on June 11, 2013. The EP was produced entirely by American music producer Harry Fraud and features guest appearances from fellow American rappers Raekwon, Wiz Khalifa, and Prodigy. The EP was preceded by the single, "Strictly 4 My Jeeps". In July 2013, he indicated a desire to collaborate with fellow Queens-bred rappers Nas and Kool G Rap on his major-label debut album, but was ultimately unsuccessful. Also in July, Bronson announced his major-label debut album would be released in early 2014.

On November 1, 2013, Bronson released Blue Chips 2, the second installment in his Blue Chips series, in promotion of the album. On October 28, 2013, Funkmaster Flex announced he would be hosting an upcoming Action Bronson mixtape. Production was revealed to be coming from Erick Sermon, Mike Will Made It, DJ Mustard and Jahlil Beats. In a November 2013 interview with Rolling Stone, Bronson stated that he would have Kool G Rap and Mobb Deep, featured on his upcoming album.

=== 2014–present: Mr. Wonderful and various studio albums ===
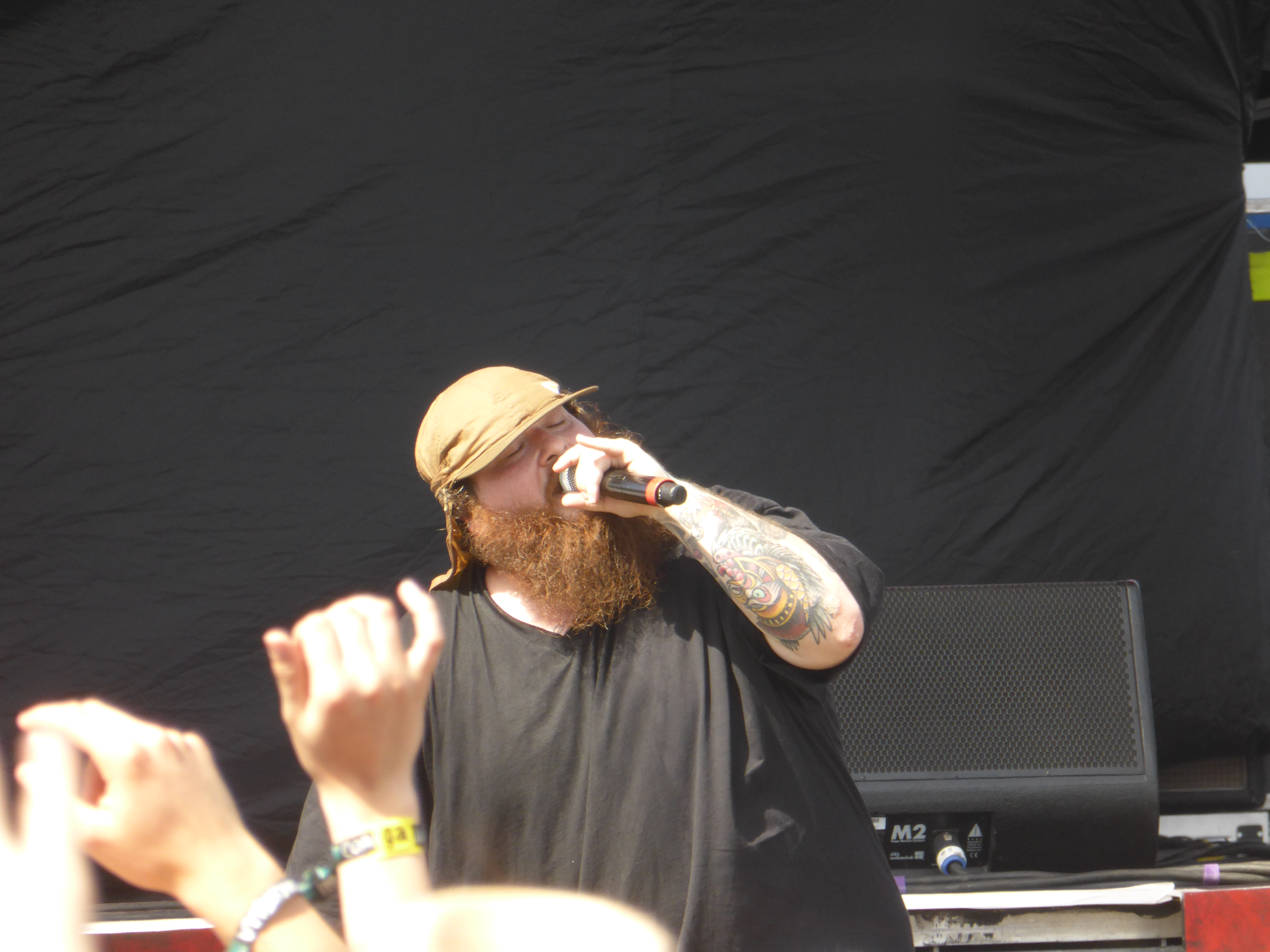
Bronson performing at Coachella in 2015

In February 2014, Action Bronson, J. Cole, Kendrick Lamar and 360 accompanied rapper Eminem, on a brief tour of Australia, South Africa and New Zealand. On May 6, 2014, Action Bronson debuted a food-oriented monthly web series, titled Fuck, That's Delicious in coordination with Vice Records.

On August 5, 2014, Bronson released the song "Easy Rider" as the first single from his second studio album Mr. Wonderful. The song was produced by Bronson's longtime producer Party Supplies. On August 20, 2014, the music video for "Easy Rider", was released. The video for "Easy Rider", which was directed by Tom Gould, pays homage to the 1969 Peter Fonda and Dennis Hopper film of the same name. Bronson released "Actin Crazy" on January 20. He released the full album on March 23, 2015, receiving over 48,000 streams during its debut week.

In October 2015, Bronson was hospitalized in Anchorage, Alaska, for emergency surgery after a concert on October 23. He remained in the hospital for several days.

In March 2016, the Program Board of the George Washington University announced that Bronson would be the headlining performer for the university's yearly spring concert, "Spring Fling". Controversy soon erupted as Bronson's song "Consensual Rape" came to light, as well as statements Bronson made that were considered homophobic, transphobic, and misogynistic. Student activist groups successfully pushed for the university to cancel the performance. In April 2016, Bronson was similarly disinvited from the Trinity College Spring Weekend concert. Bronson responded in an open letter, claiming that his songs "depict a story" and "aren't meant to be anything but an artistic expression," condemned all forms of sexual violence, and offered an apology.

On Monday May 16, 2016, he presented at the Webby Awards.

On August 25, 2017, he released his third studio album, Blue Chips 7000, which serves as a sequel to his 2013 Blue Chips 2 mixtape. In September 2017, Arslani published a cookbook based on his travel show, also titled Fuck, That's Delicious.

On October 31, 2018, Bronson announced that he was parting ways with Vice, the media company that served as his record label and television network.

In November 2018, Bronson announced a tour in support of his latest album, White Bronco. The tour ran from February 2019 to March 2019. Meyhem Lauren and Roc Marciano will be supporting.

On August 9, 2020, Bronson revealed the title of his fifth album, Only for Dolphins, released on September 25, 2020. The cover art was painted by Bronson himself. Bronson described the album as "ANOTHER BRIGHT THREAD WOVEN INTO THE TEXTURE OF THE COSMOS".

Bronson released his sixth solo studio album, Cocodrillo Turbo, on April 29, 2022. The record's guest features included Roc Marciano and Conway the Machine.

Bronson released his seventh solo studio album, Johann Sebastian Bachlava the Doctor, on July 11, 2024. This album marked Bronson's first independent record in over a decade. The album included collaborations with Larry June, as well as frequent guests Meyhem Lauren and The Alchemist.

=== Work in television and film ===
Action Bronson starred in two television series which aired on the Viceland channel: the food travel show Fuck, That's Delicious, and a nightly food talk show, The Untitled Action Bronson Show. He also starred in the comedy documentary series Traveling the Stars: Action Bronson and Friends Watch 'Ancient Aliens'.

He has had cameo roles in the films The Irishman (2019), playing a coffin salesman, and The King of Staten Island (2020). Bronson also made an appearance for AEW's All Out on September 4, 2022, and wrestled his first professional wrestling match at Grand Slam, teaming with Hook to defeat Matt Menard and Angelo Parker which aired on September 23, 2022.

== Musical style ==
=== Influences ===
Action Bronson cites fellow American rappers Kool G Rap, Nas, Cam'ron, Mobb Deep, UGK and the Wu-Tang Clan, as major influences. Other artists include Michael Jackson, Carlos Santana, Queen as well as Albanian wedding singers.

=== Rapping style ===
Bronson frequently raps about food in his songs. He is also well known for his frequent, and often obscure, allusions to athletes and sports teams. Bronson's lyrics often make reference to sports in New York City but also touch on more obscure subjects such as professional wrestlers, bodybuilders, figure skating and sports betting.

Early in his career, Bronson gained recognition for lyrically, tonally, and stylistically resembling fellow New York rapper Ghostface Killah of Wu-Tang Clan (with whom he collaborated, along with friend and fellow rapper Termanology, on a song called "Meteor Hammer", from the 2011 compilation album Legendary Weapons). Ghostface Killah himself has admitted to confusing Bronson's rapping for his own. In a 2011 interview with HipHopDX, Bronson was asked about how it was to be compared to the Wu-Tang rapper, and he responded with,

Yeah, I mean at the end of the day, it's all good because Ghostface Killah is one of the best rappers alive, so if I sound similar to the best rapper alive then that is fine. To me there is no comparison; he is a legend and I am a newcomer. If I would try and emulate with anyone it would be Kool G Rap, he is the person I look up to the most. I am not upset but at the end of the day I am my own person and no one can take that away from me.

== Personal life ==
Bronson has two children with a former girlfriend. Bronson's current girlfriend gave birth to a son in November 2019.

In mid-2020, prompted by having reached a body weight of 400 pounds (180 kg), and having a myriad of associated health problems, as well as the birth of his son, Bronson began a regimen of healthier eating as well as boxing and high-intensity interval training. As of December 2020 he had lost 127 pounds (58 kg). He took up Brazilian jiu-jitsu in 2021, training under Ryron Gracie.

== Discography ==
- Dr. Lecter (2011)
- Well-Done (2011) (with Statik Selektah)
- Mr. Wonderful (2015)
- Blue Chips 7000 (2017)
- White Bronco (2018)
- Only for Dolphins (2020)
- Cocodrillo Turbo (2022)
- Johann Sebastian Bachlava the Doctor (2024)
- Planet Frog (2026)

== Filmography ==
=== Television ===
Year	Title	Role	Notes
2011	Last Call with Carson Daly	Himself	
2014	The Eric Andre Show	Himself	Musical guest (Episode: "Ryan Kwanten; Beyoncé & Jay-Z")
2015	Lucas Bros. Moving Co.	Uncle Taco	Voice role (Episode: Lucas Burgers)
2015	Late Show with David Letterman	Himself	Performed "Baby Blue" with Chance the Rapper
2015	Ridiculousness	Himself	Episode: "Action Bronson"
2016–present	Fuck, That's Delicious	Himself	Creator, host
2016, 2019, 2020	Late Night with Seth Meyers	Himself	3 episodes
2016, 2022	Jimmy Kimmel Live!	Himself	2022: Performed "Jaguar"
2016-2019	Traveling the Stars: Action Bronson and Friends Watch Ancient Aliens	Himself	
2016-2017	The Rachael Ray Show	Himself	2 episodes
2017	Desus & Mero	Himself	Episode 131
2017	The Tonight Show Starring Jimmy Fallon	Himself	Performed "The Chairman's Intent"
2017-2018	The Untitled Action Bronson Show	Himself	Host
2017	The Chew	Himself	
2017	Most Expensivest	Himself	Episode: "Treat Yo' Self"
2017	The Wendy Williams Show	Himself	
2018-2019	Strahan & Sara	Himself	2 episodes
2022	AEW Dynamite	Himself	2 episodes
2022	AEW Rampage	Himself	

=== Film ===
Year	Title	Role	Notes
2018	Game Over, Man!	Himself	Cameo
2019	The Irishman	Casket Salesman	
2020	The King of Staten Island	Shot or Stabbed Victim	
2025	Caught Stealing	Amtrak	

== Awards and nominations ==
=== BET Hip Hop Awards ===
The BET Hip Hop Awards was established in 2006 by the network to celebrate hip-hop performers, producers and music video directors.

Year	Nominated work	Award	Result
2013	Action Bronson	Rookie of the Year	Nominated
2014	Blue Chips 2	Best Mixtape	Nominated

== See also ==
- List of hip-hop musicians
- List of people from Queens
- Music of New York City
