= Blue Chips 7000 =

Studio album by Action Bronson
- Released: August 25, 2017
- Recorded: 2016–17
- Genre: Hip hop
- Length: 38:05
- Label: Atlantic; Vice
- Producer: Action Bronson (exec.); Harry Fraud (also exec.); The Alchemist; Daringer; Woody Jackson; Knxwledge; Party Supplies

Action Bronson chronology
Mr. Wonderful (2015)	Blue Chips 7000 (2017)	White Bronco (2018)

Singles from Blue Chips 7000
- 1. "Durag vs. Headband" Released: October 21, 2016; 2. "Let Me Breathe" Released: June 14, 2017; 3. "The Chairman's Intent" Released: July 27, 2017

Blue Chips 7000 is the third studio album by American rapper Action Bronson. It is the third and final installment in his Blue Chips series, following 2013's mixtape Blue Chips 2. The album was released on August 25, 2017, by Atlantic Records and Vice Records.

== Promotion ==
On September 13, 2017, Bronson announced an 18-city fall North American tour to promote the album, starting on October 5 at Dallas' South Side Music Hall, and finishing on December 5 at New York City's Terminal 5 venue.

== Critical reception ==
Professional ratings
Aggregate scores
Source	Rating
Metacritic	76/100
Review scores
Source	Rating
AllMusic	3.5/5 stars
Exclaim!	7/10
HipHopDX	4.1/5
Pitchfork	7.4/10
Renowned for Sound	3/5 stars
Rolling Stone	3.5/5 stars

Blue Chips 7000 received generally positive reviews from critics. At Metacritic, which assigns a normalized rating out of 100 to reviews from mainstream publications, the album received an average score of 76, based on 6 reviews.

Justin Ivey of HipHopDX praised Bronson and his producers for crafting humorous lyricism with tight and upbeat instrumentation, calling it "a triumphant moment for [Action Bronson] the rapper, re-establishing his position as the court jester of Hip Hop. It’s unabashedly fun and a refreshing celebration of sample-based beats in a genre largely moving away from them." Riley Wallace of Exclaim! also commended Bronson's penchant for "straight-up bars" throughout the track list, despite lacking in emotional introspection or social commentary, saying that, "While the project does have a mixtape feel to it as opposed to an album, it delivers a lot of heat. If you're a fan of the Fuck, That's Delicious host, then this project is a must-listen." Jay Balfour, writing for Pitchfork, praised the songs for their diverse production and upfront brag raps, saying that "these new tracks are probably the strongest in his catalog—full of cheeky, relentless verses to match the energetic funk he’s best accompanied by—and the repetition feels strategic." AllMusic's Andy Kellman gave note of the production involving "scuttling percussion, noodling electric pianos, and rubbery basslines" that showcase Bronson's "nasal, humor-laced self-praise and subtle jabs at himself," concluding that "At all times, Bronson's enthusiasm for nourishment, sexual exploits, professional sports references, and inhalants remains at a high level."

== Track listing ==
No.	Title	Writer(s)	Producer	Length
1.	"Wolfpack"	Ariyan Arslani; Justin Nealis; Augusto Martelli	Party Supplies	2:34
2.	"La Luna"	Arslani; Daniel Alan Maman; Woody Jackson	The Alchemist; Jackson	3:02
3.	"The Chairman's Intent"	Arslani; Rory William Quigley; Onuma Singsiri	Harry Fraud	2:43
4.	"Hot Pepper" (featuring Meyhem Lauren and Jah Tiger)	Arslani; Glen Boothe; Ini Kamoze; Sylvester Stewart	Knxwledge	3:36
5.	"Bonzai"	Arslani; Quigley; Rik Elings	Harry Fraud	1:58
6.	"Let It Rain"	Arslani; Nealis; Sonny Akpan	Party Supplies	3:12
7.	"My Right Lung"	Arslani; Nealis; Duncan Lamont	Party Supplies	2:00
8.	"TANK" (featuring Big Body Bes)	Arslani; Maman; Doris Stojka	The Alchemist	2:41
9.	"Let Me Breathe"	Arslani; Quigley; Mark Morales; Darren Robinson; Kurt Walker; Damon Wimbley	Harry Fraud	2:52
10.	"9-24-7000" (featuring Rick Ross)	Arslani; William Roberts; Quigley; Gary Daly; Gary Johnson; Eddie Lundon	Harry Fraud	3:29
11.	"The Choreographer"	Arslani; Thomas A Paladino; Kenneth Stover	Daringer	3:12
12.	"Chop Chop Chop"	Arslani; Paladino; Alexander Gradsky	Daringer	4:06
13.	"Durag vs. Headband" (featuring Big Body Bes)	Arslani; Boothe; Besnik Sadikay	Knxwledge	2:40
Total length:				38:05

== Charts ==
Chart (2017)	Peak position
Australian Albums (ARIA)	94
Belgian Albums (Ultratop Flanders)	117
Dutch Albums (Album Top 100)	163
New Zealand Heatseekers Albums (RMNZ)	2
Swiss Albums (Schweizer Hitparade)	90
US Billboard 200	53
US Top R&B/Hip-Hop Albums (Billboard)	31
US Top Rap Albums (Billboard)	25

== In popular culture ==
- "The Chairman's Intent" is used by AEW wrestler Hook as his entrance theme.
