= Mr. Wonderful (Action Bronson album) =

Studio album by Action Bronson
- Released: March 23, 2015
- Recorded: 2014
- Genre: Hip-hop
- Length: 49:18
- Label: Vice; Atlantic
- Producer: Action Bronson (exec.); The Alchemist; Mark Ronson; Noah "40" Shebib; Omen; Party Supplies; Statik Selektah; 88-Keys; Oh No

Action Bronson chronology
| Blue Chips 2 (2013) | Mr. Wonderful (2015) | Blue Chips 7000 (2017) |

Singles from Mr. Wonderful
- 1. "Easy Rider" Released: August 5, 2014; 2. "Actin Crazy" Released: January 20, 2015; 3. "Terry" Released: February 16, 2015; 4. "Baby Blue" Released: March 3, 2015

Mr. Wonderful is the second studio album by American hip-hop recording artist Action Bronson, released on March 23, 2015, by Vice Records and Atlantic Records. The album is Bronson's first for a major label, after signing to Atlantic and Vice in August 2012. It was preceded by several mixtapes and EPs, including the Blue Chips series and Saaab Stories (2013). The album, recorded throughout 2014, was produced by several high-profile record producers, such as The Alchemist, Mark Ronson, 88-Keys, and Noah "40" Shebib, alongside Bronson himself. The album has guest appearances by Chance the Rapper, Meyhem Lauren, Chauncy Sherod, Party Supplies, and Big Body Bes.

Upon its release, Mr. Wonderful received generally positive reviews from music critics, who praised Bronson's lyricism and production choices. The album debuted at number seven on the US Billboard 200 and peaked at number 3 on the Top R&B/Hip-Hop Albums chart, alongside charting worldwide. The album was supported by four singles: "Easy Rider", "Actin Crazy", "Terry" and "Baby Blue" (featuring Chance the Rapper). The latter became Bronson's biggest hit, charting at number 91 on the Billboard Hot 100 and certifying Gold in both the United States and New Zealand.

== Background ==
Bronson began attracting major attention after collaborations with American music producers, Statik Selektah (Well-Done) and The Alchemist (Rare Chandeliers). In August 2012, Bronson signed a recording contract with Warner Bros. Records and Atlantic Records' imprint Vice Records. His first release for Vice was an extended play (EP) titled Saaab Stories, released on June 11, 2013. After announcing the title of his first studio album for Vice, in May 2014, Bronson spoke with New Musical Express about the album, "The album is sounding incredible. The whole album is a standout. I don't care about individual songs, I'm trying to make a complete, classic project. I just do my music uninfluenced by anybody else, or current trends, and it comes together at the end. Nothing needs to have a fucking theme all the time. This is just rap. I'm not trying to make people think I'm some sort of scientific wizard or inspirational poet. Fuck that! It's just happy, funny, rugged, rough rap." On November 24, 2014, Bronson revealed he had finished recording the album.

== Release and promotion ==
On May 16, 2014, Bronson announced the title of the album in a Twitter update, when he tweeted: "MY ALBUM BEEN NAMED. THE ONLY THING TO DESCRIBE ME.. MR. WONDERFUL. THATS BEEN ME SINCE I STEPPED IN THIS BULLSHIT.." On November 28, 2014, Bronson revealed there would be a worldwide concert tour upon the album's release. On December 24, 2014, he took to Twitter to reveal the album would have guest appearances by Meyhem Lauren, Big Body Bes, Party Supplies, Chauncy Sherod and Chance the Rapper. Later that day, after exposing several fake track lists, Bronson tweeted 13 song titles, unveiling the album's official track listing. On January 7, 2015, Bronson revealed the album would be released on March 24. The following day, after releasing a song from the album titled "Actin Crazy", Bronson posted which artists would be featured on which song. On January 14, 2015, Bronson made an appearance on the New York City radio station Hot 97's Funkmaster Flex show, to promote Mr. Wonderful and performed a freestyle, which prompted Flex to declare Bronson the "nicest in the game right now". On March 11, 2015, Bronson announced on Twitter that his album would be released one day sooner than originally scheduled.

=== Singles ===
On August 5, 2014, Bronson released "Easy Rider" as the album's first single. The song was produced by Bronson's long-time producer Party Supplies. On August 20, 2014, the music video for "Easy Rider", directed by Tom Gould, was released. The video pays homage to the 1969 Peter Fonda/Dennis Hopper film Easy Rider. After premiering the song on January 7, 2015, Bronson officially released "Actin Crazy", via digital distribution, as the album's second single on January 20, 2015. On February 16, 2015, "Terry" was released as the third single alongside the pre-order for the album. On March 3, 2015, "Baby Blue" was released as the album's fourth single. The song features Chicago-bred recording artist Chance the Rapper. Bronson confirmed on Twitter that they were pushing this single to radio stations and that they were filming a music video for the song.

== Critical reception ==
Professional ratings
Aggregate scores
| Source | Rating |
|---|---|
| Metacritic | 77/100 |
Review scores
| Source | Rating |
| AllMusic | 4/5 stars |
| Billboard | 4/5 stars |
| Consequence of Sound | B |
| Exclaim! | 7/10 |
| HipHopDX | 4/5 stars |
| Pitchfork | 6.3/10 |
| PopMatters | 7/10 stars |
| Rolling Stone | 3.5/5 stars |
| Spin | 8/10 |
| XXL | 4/5 (XL) |

Mr. Wonderful received positive reviews from music critics. At Metacritic, which assigns a normalized rating out of 100 to reviews from critics, the album received an average score of 77, which indicates "generally favorable reviews", based on 17 reviews. Writing for Exclaim!, Samantha O'Connor noted that Bronson has become "a more serious artist focused on experimentation" with the record, further noting that the project's "varying production clashes throughout the disorganized project." Jay Balfour of HipHopDX said, "Tellingly and thankfully, the most out-of-pocket moves on Mr. Wonderful aren’t uncharacteristic appeals to the radio but cases of its artist leaning further into the territory he’s been hinting at. Unlike the rest of his albums and mixtapes up to this point though, Mr. Wonderful is a multi-producer affair and it jumps around noticeably as a result."

Kellan Miller of XXL said, "But aside from a few problematic miscues, the majority of Mr. Wonderful can be maneuvered without the skip button in tow, culminating in "Easy Rider," a fittingly assertive statement realized through unfurled rhymes that don't require a chorus to stick in the imagination. Unshaved, donned in sweatpants, and with a compelling major label debut to his credit, Action Bronson is appropriately attired as hip-hop's latest star." Colin Fitzgerald of PopMatters said, "Mr. Wonderful may not come off as the sweeping epic its coda hints at, but it's an entertaining and unique experience that only Bronson could give us. Few rap albums can be this different and still satisfying."

== Commercial performance ==
The album debuted at number 7 on the US Billboard 200, his total sales accounted for 48,540 streams and sales (43,564 traditional album sales). It was the third highest selling album in the United States that week. The album also peaked at number 3 on their Top R&B/Hip-Hop Albums chart. By the end of 2015, the album was positioned at number 59 on the Top R&B/Hip-Hop Albums chart. In Australia, the album charted at number 26 on the Australian Recording Industry Association's (ARIA) Australian Albums Chart. In Belgium, the album charted at number 118 on the Ultratop chart in Flanders and peaked at number 103 on the same chart in Wallonia. In France, the album charted on SNEP's French Albums Chart. In New Zealand, the album charted at number 18 on Recorded Music New Zealand's (RMNZ) New Zealand Albums Chart. In Switzerland, the album charted at number 23 on the Schweizer Hitparade's Swiss Albums Chart.

== Track listing ==
| No. | Title | Writer(s) | Producer(s) | Length |
|---|---|---|---|---|
| 1. | "Brand New Car" | Ariyan Arslani; Mark Ronson; Billy Joel | Mark Ronson | 2:21 |
| 2. | "The Rising" (featuring Big Body Bes) | Arslani; Patrick Baril; Irv Brockington; Besnik Sadikay | Statik Selektah | 4:02 |
| 3. | "Terry" | Arslani; Alan Maman; David Porter; Isaac Hayes; Bill Withers; James Boxley; Eric Sadler; Ricky Walters; Nahiem Johnson; Oliver Sunderland | The Alchemist | 4:49 |
| 4. | "Actin Crazy" | Arslani; Noah Shebib; Sidney Brown; Antoine Baldwin; Clifford Smith; Haldane Wayne Browne | 40; Omen; Antoine "AudioBLK" Baldwin^{[a]} | 3:59 |
| 5. | "Falconry" (featuring Meyhem Lauren and Big Body Bes) | Arslani; Maman; Sadikay; James Rencher | The Alchemist | 2:30 |
| 6. | "Thug Love Story 2017 The Musical (Interlude)" (by Ezra Dowery) | | | 2:19 |
| 7. | "City Boy Blues" (featuring Chauncy Sherod) | Arslani; Charles Njapa; Justin Nealis; Hellmut Hattler; Peter Wolbrandt; Jan Fride Wolbrandt; Johannes Pappert; Ingo Bischof | 88-Keys; Party Supplies^{[a]} | 4:05 |
| 8. | "A Light in the Addict" (featuring Party Supplies and Black Atlass) | Arslani; Nealis; Alexander Fleming; Sean Mahon | Party Supplies | 5:56 |
| 9. | "Baby Blue" (featuring Chance the Rapper) | Arslani; Ronson; Chancelor Bennett; Zane Lowe | Mark Ronson | 4:40 |
| 10. | "Only in America" (featuring Party Supplies) | Arslani; Michael Jackson; Ralf Schultze; Peer Forsberg; Nealis | Oh No | 4:14 |
| 11. | "Galactic Love" | Arslani; Maman; Henry Gibson Jr. | The Alchemist | 2:27 |
| 12. | "The Passage (Live from Prague)" | Arslani; Nealis; Mahon | Party Supplies | 3:37 |
| 13. | "Easy Rider" | Arslani; Nealis; Mazhar Alanson; Zafer Hakansoy | Party Supplies | 4:19 |

=== Notes ===
- ^{^a} signifies a co-producer

== Personnel ==
Credits for Mr. Wonderful adapted from AllMusic.

- 88-Keys – producer
- Action Bronson – executive producer, rapping
- The Alchemist – engineer, producer
- AntMan Wonder – musician
- Antoine "Audioblk" Baldwin – producer
- Big Body Bes – featured artist
- Nick Bilardello – package design
- BlackAtlass – featured artist
- Tommy "TNT" Brenneck – guitar
- Sidney "Omen" Brown – producer
- Noel Cadastre – engineer
- Curt Chambers – guitar
- Chance the Rapper – featured artist, backing vocals
- Ricky Damien – engineer
- Ezra Dowery – featured artist
- Rhys Downing – engineer
- Tom Elmhirst – mixing
- Nick Hook – engineer
- Leon Kelly – assistant
- Dave Kutch – mastering
- Meyhem Lauren – featured artist
- Gloria Lovett – vocals
- Zane Lowe – backing vocals
- Leon Michels – engineer, Mellotron, vibraphone
- Richard "FRKO" Montgomery – art direction, illustrations
- Riggs Morales – A&R
- Justin Nealis – engineer, mixing
- Joya Nemley – A&R
- Oh No – producer
- Party Supplies – featured artist, guitar, producer
- Mark Ronson – bass, drums, Fender Rhodes, guitar, piano, producer, programming, scratching
- Andrew Sarlo – engineer
- Gabriel Schuman – assistant
- Noah Shebib – engineer, mixing, producer
- Chauncy Sherrod – featured artist, vocals
- Justin Smith – mastering
- Statik Selektah – engineer, mixing, producer, programming
- Evan Stewart – engineer
- Jared Tauben – engineer
- Carolyn Tracey – package production
- Donnie trumpet – trumpet
- Cas Weinbren – piano
- Ryan West – mixing
- Danny Zook – sample clearance

== Charts ==
=== Weekly charts ===
| Chart (2015) | Peak position |
|---|---|
| Australian Albums (ARIA) | 26 |
| Belgian Albums (Ultratop Flanders) | 118 |
| Belgian Albums (Ultratop Wallonia) | 103 |
| French Albums (SNEP) | 92 |
| New Zealand Albums (RMNZ) | 18 |
| Swiss Albums (Schweizer Hitparade) | 23 |
| US Billboard 200 | 7 |
| US Top R&B/Hip-Hop Albums (Billboard) | 3 |

=== Year-end charts ===
| Chart (2015) | Position |
|---|---|
| US Top R&B/Hip-Hop Albums (Billboard) | 59 |
