= The Untitled Action Bronson Show =

- Genre: Food; Talk show
- Starring: Action Bronson; The Special Victims Unit
- Country of origin: United States
- Original language: English
- No. of seasons: 1
- No. of episodes: 59

Production
- Executive producer: Action Bronson
- Running time: 30 minutes

Original release
- Network: Viceland
- Release: October 23, 2017 – February 15, 2018

Related
- Fuck That’s Delicious; Traveling the Stars: Action Bronson and Friends Watch Ancient Aliens; Desus & Mero

The Untitled Action Bronson Show was a culinary late-night talk show series on Viceland, hosted by Action Bronson, featuring numerous notable guests.

== About ==
The Untitled Action Bronson Show was Action Bronson’s third series on VICELAND, following his travel show Fuck That’s Delicious, and Traveling The Stars: Action Bronson and Friends Watch 'Ancient Aliens'. The show was VICELAND’s first food-oriented late-night talk show.

=== Premise ===
The Untitled Action Bronson Show, in contrast to other talk shows, had a very eclectic format and featured a wide array of guests from a variety of fields in each episode. For example, in many episodes, there are multiple musical guests that perform alongside the house-band, The Special Victims Unit, as well as several culinary guests who often cook alongside Bronson.

Bronson frequently brought on his longtime friends and musical and television collaborators, The Alchemist, and Meyhem Lauren, who took part in talking to Bronson’s guests, assisting with preparing food, and occasionally performing a song.

In addition to musical guests, the show also featured various unconventional performers such as ax throwers, LARPers, Star Wars lightsaber fight clubs, sumo wrestlers, knitting circles, potters, haberdashery enthusiasts, fresh mozzarella makers, and more.

The show also had a number of special episodes for various holidays, and events.

== Notable guests ==
The Untitled Action Bronson Show featured numerous notable guests, such as those listed below.

=== Notable guests ===
- Andrew Zimmern
- Awkwafina
- Bronson Pinchot
- CC Sabathia
- Carlo Carciotto (Casa Della Mozzarella)
- David Arquette
- David Burke
- Debi Mazar
- Drita
- Dua Lipa
- Fabolous
- Gabriele Corcos
- Gail Simmons
- Gilbert Gottfried
- Jacques Torres
- Jo Koy
- John Basedow
- Jourdan Dunn
- Lidia Bastianich
- Marc Ecko
- Mario Batali
- Meyhem Lauren
- Michael Imperioli
- Michael Rapaport
- Michael Solomonov
- Michael White
- Molly Sims
- Rickey Smiley
- Ronnie Coleman
- Rosie Perez
- Sally Jesse Raphael
- Scott Conant
- Smokepurpp
- Steve Schirripa
- Taylor Dayne
- The Alchemist
- Wyclef Jean

== See also ==
- List of programs broadcast by Viceland
