= Shadow Realm =

Shadow Realm may refer to:

- Shadow Realms, a cancelled video game
- The Shadow Realm, a fictional location in English-language localizations of the Yu-Gi-Oh! series
- The Shadow Realm, a fictional location in the video game Spyro: Shadow Legacy
- The Shadow Realm, a fictional location in the film Thor: Love and Thunder
- The Shadow Realm, a fictional location in the video game Shadow Warrior and its sequels
- "Shadow Realm", a 2024 song from the Action Bronson album Johann Sebastian Bachlava the Doctor

== See also ==
- Daemons of the Shadow Realm, a manga series
- Shadowed Realms, an online magazine
