= White Bronco (album) =

Studio album by Action Bronson
- Released: November 1, 2018
- Recorded: 2018
- Genre: Hip-hop
- Length: 26:26
- Labels: Action Bronson Corporation; Empire
- Producers: Daringer; Harry Fraud; Knxwledge; Party Supplies; SVU; Samiyam

Action Bronson chronology
Blue Chips 7000 (2017)	White Bronco (2018)	Lamb Over Rice (2019)

Singles from White Bronco
- 1. "White Bronco" Released: September 21, 2018; 2. "Prince Charming" Released: October 19, 2018

White Bronco is the fourth studio album by American rapper Action Bronson. The album was released on November 1, 2018, by the Action Bronson Corporation and Empire Distribution.

== Singles ==
The album's first single "White Bronco" was released on September 21, 2018. The album's second single "Prince Charming" was released on October 19, 2018.

== Critical reception ==
Professional ratings
Review scores
Source	Rating
HipHopDX	3.9/5
Pitchfork	5.1/10

White Bronco received mixed reviews from critics. Phillip Mlynar of Pitchfork gave the album a 5.1 out of 10, saying "The 26-minute White Bronco, Bronson’s ninth full-length project, largely lacks the piquancy and depth that made him matter." Scott Glaysher of HipHopDX gave the album a 3.9 out of 5, saying "There is no denying that Bronson is one of Hip Hop’s most beloved characters and thankfully he continues to make strong songs and albums to back it up. With that said this album isn’t anything out of the ordinary for Bronson and might not be talked about or listened to this time next year."

== Track listing ==
No.	Title	Producer(s)	Length
1.	"Dr. Kimble"	Harry Fraud	2:58
2.	"Irishman Freestyle"	Party Supplies	1:35
3.	"Mt. Etna"	Daringer	2:34
4.	"Live from the Moon" (featuring Yung Mehico)	Knxwledge	2:38
5.	"White Bronco"	Daringer; SVU	2:44
6.	"Brutal" (featuring Meyhem Lauren)	Party Supplies	1:58
7.	"Prince Charming"	Knxwledge	2:31
8.	"Telemundo"	Samiyam	2:23
9.	"Picasso's Ear"	Knxwledge	1:53
10.	"Ring Ring" (featuring Big Body Bes)	Harry Fraud	2:21
11.	"Swerve on Em" (featuring ASAP Rocky)	Harry Fraud	2:51
Total length:			26:26

== Charts ==
Chart (2018)	Peak position
US Independent Albums (Billboard)	33
