= Traveling the Stars: Action Bronson and Friends Watch Ancient Aliens =

American comedy-documentary series

- Created by: Action Bronson
- Starring: Action Bronson; The Alchemist; Knxwledge; Big Body Bes
- Opening theme: "Actin Crazy" by Action Bronson (Season 1) "White Bronco" by Action Bronson (Season 2)
- Composers: 40; Omen; AudioBLK
- Country of origin: United States
- Original language: English
- No. of seasons: 2
- No. of episodes: 18

Production
- Running time: 44 minutes
- Production company: Vice Media

Original release
- Network: Viceland
- Release: April 20, 2016 – August 17, 2019

Traveling the Stars: Action Bronson and Friends Watch Ancient Aliens (alternately titled Action Bronson Watches Ancient Aliens) is a comedy-documentary series hosted by American rapper Action Bronson. It was produced by Viceland and aired in 2016.

On June 4, 2019, the series was revived and renewed for a second season which premiered on August 5, 2019.

== About ==
The show focuses on rapper Action Bronson sitting on a couch, smoking marijuana with his friends, and watching episodes of History's Ancient Aliens, from Viceland's sister network. Bronson is most often accompanied by music producers the Alchemist and Knxwledge, his "Albanian cousin" Big Body Bes, and various guest stars, including musicians, actors, and other associates of his. According to producers Jordan Kinley and Hannah Gregg, the show was conceived as a way to address disgruntled viewers of H2, the network that formerly aired Ancient Aliens before being replaced by Viceland on cable carriers in the United States. The show is notable for its use of greenscreen. The participants watch Ancient Aliens on a monitor while the show is greenscreened behind them. Objects float around in the background while the guests smoke cannabis in the foreground. The original Ancient Aliens show supports the ancient astronauts theory popularized by author Erich von Däniken.

The show is free-form and unscripted, and Gregg says that they "literally will not tell [the guests] what they're supposed to do" (though content is edited for advertiser and viewer appropriateness, where required). Each episode is blocked for an hour, giving an average runtime of 44 minutes.

== Episodes ==
=== Season 1 (2016) ===
No. overall	No. in season	Title	Original release date
0	1	"420 Special"	April 20, 2016
In honor of 420, Action Bronson combines two of his favorite things: Marijuana and the hit television series Ancient Aliens. Join Action and his friends as they reach the highest of highs while watching The Mayan Conspiracy episode of Ancient Aliens.
1	2	"Dinosaurs"	July 21, 2016
Guest starring Earl Sweatshirt and ScHoolboy Q. The stoners theorize that dinosaurs were selectively killed off by Ancient Aliens.
2	3	"Unexplained Structures"	July 28, 2016
Guest starring Tyler, the Creator. The stoners consider historic ruins and structures around the world that humans possibly could not have made. Tyler smells weed and tries to identify the strain.
3	4	"Temples of Gold"	August 4, 2016
Guest starring Three Loco. The stoners consider the idea that aliens came to this planet to harvest gold using genetically modified humans.
4	5	"Creation of Man"	August 11, 2016
Action is joined by spiritual wind dancer Alorah Inanna as they dive deep into the concept that extraterrestrials had an integral part in the development of the human race.
5	6	"Angels & Aliens"	August 18, 2016
Action Bronson learns how ancient aliens have been misinterpreted as angels.
6	7	"Destination Orion"	August 25, 2016
Action and friends hang with the delightful Melissa Etheridge. Together, they find out why ancient societies were so fascinated by the Orion constellation.
7	8	"Mysterious Places"	September 1, 2016
From The Bermuda Triangle to the Zone of Silence, Action Bronson and his crew learn that aliens may have known about the locations of some of the world's most mysterious phenomena. Guest starring Peter Dante and Simon Rex.
8	9	"Alien Devastation"	September 8, 2016
Action and crew, joined by pro wrestlers Rob Van Dam, Sabu and Super Genie, learn how aliens may have caused some of Earth's ancient natural disasters.
9	10	"Alien Tech"	September 15, 2016
Action learns which concepts for today's technology may have originated with aliens thousands of years ago.
10	11	"Founding Fathers"	September 22, 2016
Action Bronson, Eric André, and Earl Sweatshirt learn that American founding fathers may have known about Ancient Aliens. Also starring Too $hort and Simon Rex.

=== Season 2 (2019) ===
No. overall	No. in season	Title	Original release date
11	1	"The Pharaoh's Curse"	August 5, 2019
Action Bronson invites R&B singer Miguel and pro-wrestlers Sabu and Super Genie to debate extraterrestrial influence in ancient Egypt. Together, they watch the world's most disturbing talent show.
12	2	"The Replicants"	August 6, 2019
Action Bronson, the Alchemist, and Big Body Bes remember life before reincarnation with a freestyle from Sisqó, Dru Hill, and a one-man band from the future.
13	3	"The Sentinels"	August 7, 2019
Action hosts a get-together with TV personality Tiffany "New York" Pollard and former WWE wrestler Scott Hall to discuss the evidence of mankind's extraterrestrial origins and hash.
14	4	"Alien Architects"	August 8, 2019
From "Rolling Thunder" to "Hits from the Bong", hip-hop legends Cypress Hill and pro-wrestler Rob Van Dam demonstrate the consequences of a finishing move on Action's friends.
15	5	"The Majestic Twelve"	August 14, 2019
Actor Jaleel White explores UFO conspiracy theories, while Action Bronson persuades his friends to attempt dangerous performances with a professional stunt director.
16	6	"The Desert Codes"	August 21, 2019
Joined by porn star Mr. Marcus, Action Bronson expands on his passion for painting through discussions of ancient alien art and wisdom from the adult film industry.
17	7	"Forged by the Gods"	August 28, 2019
Action Bronson, the Alchemist, & Big Body Bes invite celebrity hairstylist Giuseppe Franco and retired NFL player Martellus Bennett to discuss tacos and ancient alien technology.
18	8	"The Animal Agenda"	September 4, 2019
Comedian David Alan Grier challenges the idea that extraterrestrials planted animals on earth, while Action develops a psychic connection with a tarantula, a chinchilla, and a boa.

== See also ==
- Fuck, That's Delicious
- The Untitled Action Bronson Show
