= Smart Crew =

Art collective from Queens, New York

- Origin: Queens, New York City
- Years active: 1997–present
- Members: Action Bronson; Meyhem Lauren; SYCO13; Jeffrey Gamblero; Snoeman

Smart Crew is a supergroup and art collective originating from Queens, NY, that was formed by SYCO13, MEY (Meyhem Lauren) and LUK in 1997. Throughout the years, the crew has acquired members and has become a collective of various artists including DCEVE, KORN (Jeffrey Vanchiro, best known as Jeffrey Gamblero), and Action Bronson. Their crew logo consists of an Old English style "S" with the image of a graduation cap on top.

They are known for their public art on trucks, walls and stickers seen all over the world. The crew is also known for their territorial wars in New York with the street artist Banksy.

Smart Crew was interviewed by the Art of Rolling Magazine and Bombin Magazine. In 2014, Smart Crew worked with Sixty Soho and Animal New York on a demolition party and destroyed the hotel lobby as an art installation. They have also contributed to Mass Appeal, the book Autograf: New York City's Graffiti Writers by Peter Sutherland (ISBN 1-57687-203-3), the BET Hip Hop Awards, and the DKNY 2014 Spring line. The crew is also responsible for the "Chinatown" Mural in New York City located at 1 Allen Street. Smart Crew has also exhibited with Fool's Gold in December 2013 at their Brooklyn flagship store.

== Gallery ==
Smart Crew logo

Smart Crew stickers

Smart Crew truck art, NYC

Smart Crew artwork on a van, NYC
