= Baby Blue (Action Bronson song) =

Single by Action Bronson featuring Chance the Rapper

from the album Mr. Wonderful
- Released: March 3, 2015
- Recorded: 2014
- Length: 4:40
- Label: Atlantic; Vice
- Songwriters: Arian Arslani; Mark Ronson; Chancellor Bennett; Zane Lowe
- Producer: Ronson

Action Bronson singles chronology
"Terry" (2015)	"Baby Blue" (2015)	"Durag vs. Headband" (2016)

Chance the Rapper singles chronology
"Nothing Came to Me" (2015)	"Baby Blue" (2015)	"Church" (2015)

Music video
- "Baby Blue" on YouTube

"Baby Blue" is a song by American rapper Action Bronson with a guest appearance from fellow rapper Chance the Rapper. It was released on March 3, 2015, by Atlantic and Vice as the fourth and final single from his second album Mr. Wonderful (2015). It was co-written by both artists, along with Zane Lowe, who did a punch-up to the chorus, and Mark Ronson, who also produced the song. A breakup song, "Baby Blue" ends a three-part suite started by "City Boy Blues" and "A Light in the Addict" that is preluded by the album's interlude, "Thug Love Story 2017 The Musical".

The song received positive reviews from critics, who generally praised Chance's verse. "Baby Blue" was Bronson's first solo appearance on the Billboard Hot 100, debuting at number 91 for one week. It also charted at numbers 21 and 30 on the Hot Rap Songs and Hot R&B/Hip-Hop Songs charts respectively. The song was certified Gold by the Recording Industry Association of America (RIAA), denoting sales of over 500,000 copies. An accompanying music video for the song, directed by Lil Chris, was released on Bronson's YouTube page as part of the 2015 YouTube Music Awards and pays homage to the 1988 comedy film Coming to America.

== Background and development ==
Following the album's first single "Easy Rider" (2014) and the digital release of "Actin' Crazy" (2015), Action Bronson revealed the track list for Mr. Wonderful and showed which songs had collaborations to them. "Baby Blue" was produced by Mark Ronson, who had previously produced for singers like Daniel Merriweather and Bruno Mars. The song was written by Ronson, Arian Arslani, Chancellor Bennett and Zane Lowe. It acts as a closer to a three-part suite set by "City Boy Blues" and "A Light in the Addict" that was preluded by the album's interlude, "Thug Love Story 2017 The Musical". It's about an elderly man who laments about a former love leaving the streets.

In an interview with Complex, Bronson explained that he wanted to put together a small musical with the three tracks he had within the album and found the ending to it as a kiss-off to a former flame and moving on from it. The beat to Lord Tariq and Peter Gunz's "Deja Vu (Uptown Baby)" (1997) was used as a reference by Ronson to come up with the song's opening. The chorus to the song: "Why you gotta act like a bitch when I'm with you / Baby girl, I'm blue," was co-written by then-BBC Radio 1 host Zane Lowe, with Bronson providing vocals to it. Chance the Rapper, credited as a featured artist on the recording, explained to Complex that his verse for the song was inspired by an amalgam of various women he had previously encountered, while lending levity to the outcome of it all.

== Critical reception ==
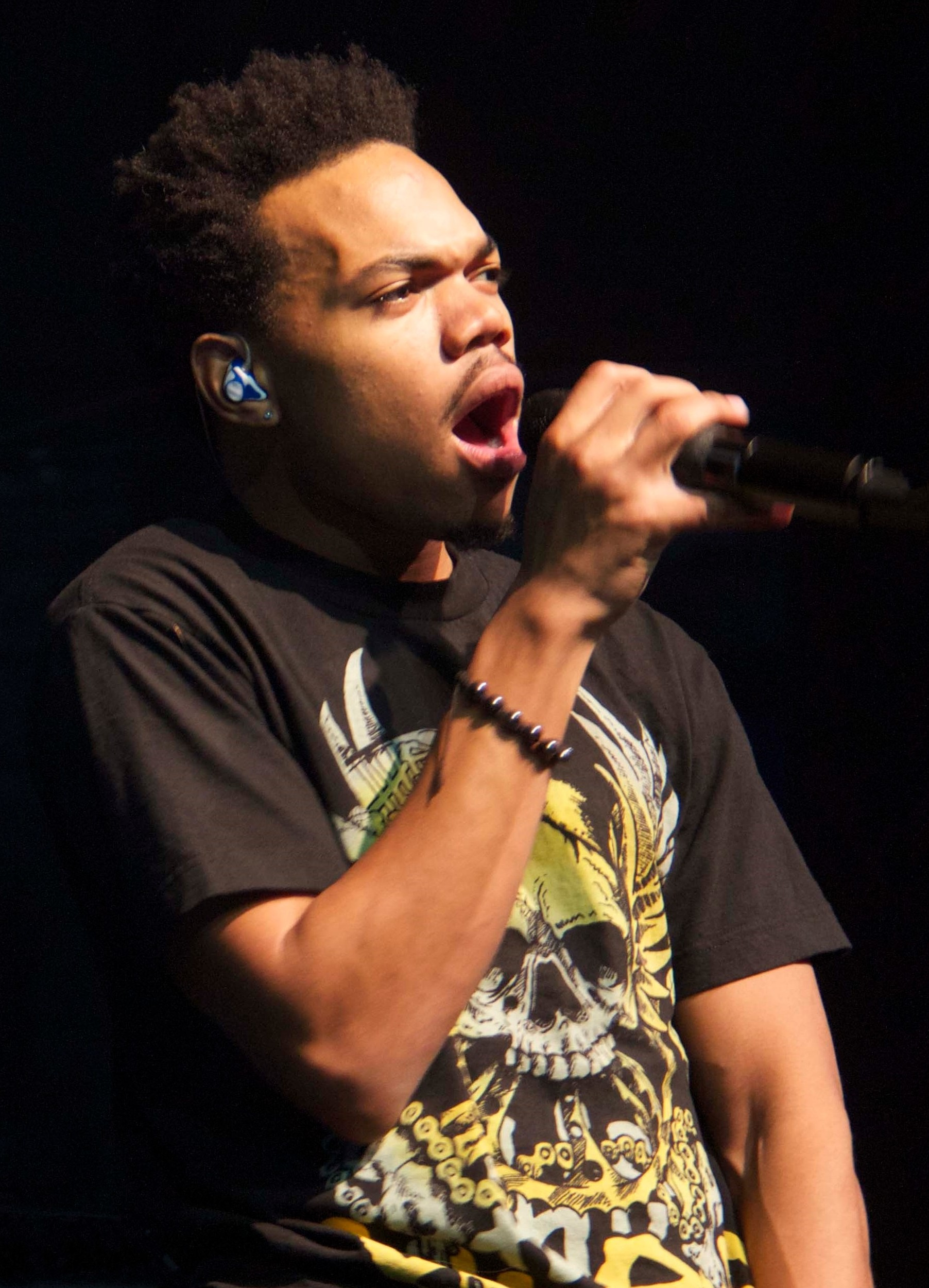
Critics praised Chance the Rapper's verse in the song.

"Baby Blue" garnered positive reviews from music critics. Pat Levy of Consequence of Sound praised Bronson's singing over the piano-heavy production but singled out Chance's verse as the highlight for his "laundry list of things he hopes will happen to the girl who romantically maligned him." Dan Weiss of Spin called it the standout of the album's suite, due in particular to Chance's absurdly dark and humorous lyrics. Jay Balfour from HipHopDX called it "a catchy piano-driven track with Pop appeal" and found Chance's verse on the song to be "personal and delightfully petty." Colin Fitzgerald of PopMatters put the track alongside "Easy Rider" as 'album highlights', saying that without them "the album's second half would seriously hinder the overall value of Mr. Wonderful." Craig Jenkins of Billboard commended Bronson for having "the courage to sing serviceably on the chorus." Jordan Sargent of Pitchfork criticized Bronson's whiny vocals and Ronson's production throughout the song but gave praise to Chance's quirk-filled verse, saying that "he pulls off in half a minute what Bronson couldn't in fifteen: using an imagined story to reveal humanity through humor."

== Commercial performance ==
On the week of April 11, 2015, "Baby Blue" debuted at number 91 on the Billboard Hot 100, but left the next week. That same week, it debuted at number 30 on the Hot R&B/Hip-Hop Songs chart, but fell eight spots to numbers 38 and 46 respectively for two consecutive weeks from April 18 to 25, before leaving the chart completely. On the Hot Rap Songs chart, it debuted at number 21 before leaving the next week. The song would later be certified Platinum by the Recording Industry Association of America (RIAA) for equivalent sales of 1,000,000 units in the United States. In New Zealand, although the single did not chart, it was certified Gold by Recorded Music New Zealand (RMNZ) for equivalent sales of 15,000 units in the country.

== Music video ==
On March 9, 2015, Bronson stated via his Twitter account that a music video for the song was being worked on. He released a one-minute long "teaser" for the video on his YouTube page on March 21. Two days later, it premiered on Bronson's YouTube page as part of the 2015 YouTube Music Awards. The Lil Chris-directed video is a tribute to the 1988 comedy film Coming to America, with Bronson playing every character Eddie Murphy portrayed throughout the film. American rapper Big Body Bes and bodybuilder Jill Rudison both appear as Arsenio Hall and Shari Headley's characters respectively.

== Live performances ==
On March 22, 2015, Bronson and Chance performed the song during SXSW at the 2015 mtvU Woodie Awards. On March 25, two days after the release of his second album, Bronson sang the song with Chance on national television for the first time on the Late Show with David Letterman with Chance's band The Social Experiment. On April 21, Bronson made an appearance on DJ Skee's SKEE TV via Fuse.

== Charts ==
Chart (2015)	Peak position
US Billboard Hot 100	91
US Hot R&B/Hip-Hop Songs (Billboard)	30
US Hot Rap Songs (Billboard)	21

== Certifications ==
Region	Certification	Certified units/sales
New Zealand (RMNZ)	Gold	15,000^{‡}
United States (RIAA)	Platinum	1,000,000^{‡}
^{‡} Sales+streaming figures based on certification alone.
