= Cocodrillo Turbo =

Studio album by Action Bronson
- Released: April 29, 2022
- Length: 30:03
- Label: Loma Vista; Concord
- Producer: Action Bronson; Daringer; The Alchemist; Roc Marciano; Mono En Stereo; Yung Mehico

Action Bronson chronology
Only for Dolphins (2020)	Cocodrillo Turbo (2022)	Johann Sebastian Bachlava the Doctor (2024)

Singles from Cocodrillo Turbo
- 1. "Subzero" Released: April 7, 2022

Cocodrillo Turbo is the sixth studio album by American rapper Action Bronson. It was released on April 29, 2022, through Loma Vista Recordings and Concord Records.

== Singles ==
The album's first and only single, "Subzero", was released on April 7, 2022.

== Critical reception ==
Professional ratings
Review scores
Source	Rating
AllMusic	3.5/5 stars
Clash	8/10
HipHopDX	3.9/5
Loud and Quiet	5/10
Pitchfork	7.7/10
Spill Magazine	4/5 stars

Louis Torracinta of Clash gave the album an 8 out of 10, calling it "a veritable buffet of East Coast rap delights" that "flows easily and seamlessly, with just enough oddball moments thrown in to remember the quirky dude you're listening to." A writer for Spill Magazine gave the album a 4 out of 5, saying "Cocodrillo Turbo perfectly mixes the rock-influenced rap we know Bronson for, with some of his most outrageous production I've heard in a while." Drew Millard of Pitchfork gave the album a 7.7 out of 10, saying "Crocodrillo Turbo [sic] is a hallucinatory, fuzzed-out, straight-up bonkers journey into the wilderness." Ben Brutocao of HipHopDX gave the album a 3.9 out of 5, saying "Cocodrillo Turbo is a purposefully imperfect experiment in genre. The creative team behind the album—composed primarily of Bronson, Alchemist and Daringer—found a way to make a jungle-themed rap album that doesn't come off like a cheesy rainforest cafe." Paul Simpson of AllMusic gave the album a 3.5 out of 5, saying it was "hardly reflective" of Bronson's weight loss milestone but critiqued that it was the "most motivated [the rapper] has sounded in years", highlighting the "sheer outlandishness" in his performance over the "punch-drunk jazz and sideways psychedelia" soundscape.

Conversely, Dominic Haley of Loud and Quiet gave the album a 5 out of 10, praising the usual Bronson elements from previous efforts but criticized the lyrics for lacking personal anecdotes and utilizing "well-worn hip hop tropes", saying "Cocodrillo Turbo ends up feeling more like a Ghostface Killah album with added cooking references than the oddball Action Bronson we all fell in love with."

== Track listing ==
Credits adapted from Tidal.

No.	Title	Writer(s)	Producer(s)	Length
1.	"Hound Dog"	Ariyan Arslani; Jean-Claude Vannier; Tom Paladino	Daringer	2:21
2.	"Tongpo" (featuring Conway the Machine)	Arslani; Buppa Saichol; Demond Price	Action Bronson	4:02
3.	"Estaciones" (featuring Hologram)	Arslani; Jason Rencher; Albert Lewis Hartdige; Alan Maman	The Alchemist	3:20
4.	"Jaws"	Arslani; Maman; Janko Nilović; Louis Delacour	The Alchemist	1:31
5.	"Subzero"	Arslani; Maman; Steve Hill; Warren Ham	The Alchemist	3:00
6.	"Turkish" (featuring Meyhem Lauren)	Arslani; Paladino; James Rencher; Ian Henry; Randell Carr	Daringer	3:40
7.	"Jaguar"	Arslani; Rahkeim Calief Meyer; Jerline Williams; William Johnson	Roc Marciano	2:55
8.	"Zambezi" (featuring Roc Marciano)	Arslani; Meyer; Steve Gray	Bronson	2:49
9.	"Ninety One"	Arslani; Eddie Floyd; El Richard Moringlane	Mono En Stereo	1:58
10.	"Storm of the Century" (featuring Yung Mehico)	Arslani; Paladino; Dorian Sorriaux; Elin Larsson; Zack Anderson; Matthew Carrillo	Daringer; Yung Mehico	4:24
Total length:				30:03

== Chart ==
Chart (2022)	Peak position
Top Album Sales (Billboard)	64
