= Dr. Lecter (album) =

Studio album by Action Bronson
- Released: March 15, 2011
- Recorded: 2010–11
- Genre: Hip hop
- Length: 42:09
- Label: Fine Fabric Delegates
- Producer: Tommy Mas

Action Bronson chronology
Bon Appetit ..... Bitch!!!!! (2010)	Dr. Lecter (2011)	Well-Done (2011)

Professional ratings
Review scores
Source	Rating
Beats Per Minute	85%
MSN Music (Expert Witness)	B+
Pitchfork	8.1/10
RapReviews	7.5/10

Dr. Lecter is the debut studio album by the American rapper Action Bronson. It was released on March 15, 2011. The album's title refers to Dr. Hannibal Lecter, a character in the psychological-thriller film The Silence of the Lambs. The album is entirely produced by Tommy Mas. Almost all of the beats on Dr. Lecter were made with breakbeat samples. After hearing this album, the producer Statik Selektah collaborated with Bronson on an album titled Well Done, released on November 22, 2011.

== Track listing ==
*All songs produced by Tommy Mas.

No.	Title	Length
1.	"Moonstruck"	2:12
2.	"Barry Horowitz"	2:04
3.	"The Madness"	3:33
4.	"Larry Csonka"	3:25
5.	"Ronnie Coleman"	2:55
6.	"Bag of Money" (featuring Meyhem Lauren)	3:36
7.	"Brunch"	2:27
8.	"Shiraz"	2:24
9.	"Buddy Guy"	2:55
10.	"Jerk Chicken" (featuring Maffew Ragazino)	2:30
11.	"Chuck Person" (featuring Meyhem Lauren, Shaz IllYork and AG da Coroner)	3:34
12.	"Forbidden Fruit"	1:27
13.	"Suede" (featuring Meyhem Lauren, Shaz IllYork, Fonda and Machine)	4:01
14.	"Get Off My P.P."	2:09
15.	"Beautiful Music"	3:04
