= Johann Sebastian Bachlava the Doctor =

Studio album by Action Bronson
- Released: July 11, 2024
- Genre: East Coast hip-hop
- Length: 30:32
- Label: Self-released
- Producer: Action Bronson; The Alchemist; Daringer

Action Bronson chronology
Cocodrillo Turbo (2022)	Johann Sebastian Bachlava the Doctor (2024)	Planet Frog (2026)

Singles from Johann Sebastian Bachlava the Doctor
- 1. "Nourish a Thug" Released: May 30, 2024; 2. "Sega" Released: June 13, 2024

Johann Sebastian Bachlava the Doctor is the seventh studio album by American rapper Action Bronson, released on July 11, 2024. Production was handled by Bronson, Daringer and the Alchemist. The album features guest appearances from Julian Love, Yung Mehico, Meyhem Lauren, Larry June and the Alchemist. The album was preceded by two singles: "Nourish a Thug", which was released on May 30, 2024, and "Sega", which was released on June 13, 2024.

== Background and release ==
On February 21, 2024, Bronson teased his seventh studio album, Johann Sebastian Bachlava the Doctor, on Twitter. The album's lead single, "Nourish a Thug", was released on May 30. The album's second single, "Sega", was released on June 13, 2024. Both singles received music videos directed by Sean Kelly, depicting Bronson, as his fictional character, Dr. Baklava, on the run from the law. The album's cover art and release date of July 11 were revealed on July 7, 2024. The release date was chosen to coincide with the 80th birthday of Bronson's mother.

== Critical reception ==
Professional ratings
Review scores
Source	Rating
Hive Magazine	5/5 stars
RapManiacZ	3.5/5
RapReviews	7.5/10

Johann Sebastian Bachlava the Doctor received generally positive reviews from music critics. In a 5-star review, Alfie Clark of Hive Magazine described it as "an album that is so easy on the ears, yet provides a certain level of complexity that is so often seen in the alternative rap scene, all whilst keeping his wild and hilarious personality in the mix". Clark additionally described the album's production as "superb". Jack Berth of Respect My Region considered it "a truly amazing rap record", and also commended the album's production, naming it "exceptional" and "extremely diverse". Alton Barnhart of SLUG opined that while the album was "a fun listen", there was "no true narrative or concept, just a liar’s dice barrel of songs that don’t quite fit together".

== Track listing ==
Johann Sebastian Bachlava the Doctor track listing
No.	Title	Writer(s)	Producer	Length
1.	"Splash (Provocativ)" (featuring Julian Love and Yung Mehico)	Ariyan Arslani; Julian Litwack; Matthew Carrillo; Tom Paladino	Daringer	2:50
2.	"Sega"	Arslani; Alan Maman	The Alchemist	1:45
3.	"Nourish a Thug"	Arslani; Craig Huxley; Paladino	Daringer	2:45
4.	"Hideo Nomo"	Arslani; Litwack; Paladino	Daringer	3:21
5.	"Salvaje"	Arslani	Action Bronson	3:14
6.	"Hogan" (featuring Meyhem Lauren)	Arslani; James Rencher	Bronson	2:42
7.	"Citrus Wahoo" (featuring Meyhem Lauren)	Arslani; Maman; Rencher	The Alchemist	2:17
8.	"Kompressor" (featuring Larry June)	Arslani; Larry Hendricks; Paladino	Daringer	2:53
9.	"NBA Leather on NBC" (featuring The Alchemist)	Arslani; Maman	The Alchemist	2:45
10.	"Shadow Realm"	Arslani	Bronson	2:44
11.	"Doctor"	Arslani; Paladino	Daringer	3:16
Total length:				30:32

== Personnel ==
Credits adapted from Tidal.

- Joe LaPorta – mastering
- Joe Visciano – mixing
- Todd Cooper – mixing (track 8), vocal engineering (track 8)
