= Blue Chips 2 =

Mixtape by Action Bronson and Party Supplies
- Released: November 1, 2013
- Recorded: 2012–13
- Genre: Hip hop
- Length: 50:25
- Label: Vice Records
- Producer: Party Supplies

Action Bronson chronology
Saaab Stories (2013)	Blue Chips 2 (2013)	Mr. Wonderful (2015)

Blue Chips 2 is the second collaborative mixtape by the American rapper Action Bronson and the producer Party Supplies. It was released for free on November 1, 2013, by Vice Records. This is the sequel to their collaborative mixtape Blue Chips, released on March 12, 2012.

== Critical reception ==
Professional ratings
Review scores
Source	Rating
Complex	(positive)
Exclaim!	6/10
HipHopDX	(positive)
Pitchfork Media	8/10
PopMatters	6/10
Spin	7/10
Stereogum	(positive)
XXL	(XL))

Blue Chips 2 was met with generally positive reviews from music critics. Jordan Sargent of Pitchfork Media wrote, "It is just a whole lot of fun. Bronson, for whatever reason, only seems to hit this note with Party Supplies in his back pocket. But when he does, his music is not only a blast, but undeniably distinctive." Sheldon Pearce of XXL gave it an "XL" rating saying, "On his latest effort, Action Bronson proves that sequels don’t always fall short of marks set by lofty expectations; in fact, sometimes they outperform their predecessor. From the outset, you know what this is: Blue Chips 2 is a depiction of immeasurable leisure and implausible overindulgence sold not as truth, but as pure entertainment."

Aaron Matthews of Exclaim! said, "Nonetheless whether rapping over "Tequila" ("Pepe Lopez") or a host of '80s radio classics ("Contemporary Man") Bronson displays a sense of joy rarely heard in rap these days. The portly spitter is clearly in his zone here, and the highlights are high; from the hazy acoustic funk of "Midget Cough" or the glorious horns of "Twin Peugeots." Steven Goldstein of HipHopDX deemed the mixtape a "free-album" saying, "Blue Chips 2 is unfiltered and incongruous, just what we’ve come to expect from Hip Hop’s unexpected."

Brandon Soderberg of Spin said, "consistency is the name of the game right now: Every merely good-to-great release keeps the blogs intrigued and the tour dates coming. So yeah, here's Blue Chips 2, once again juggling foodie poetry with hyper-specific sports references, and further pushing his Scorsese-bit-player-mook mentality that's trashy, yet kind of classy."

== Accolades ==
Spin ranked Blue Chips 2 number 13 on its list of the 40 best hip hop albums of 2013. They said,

Bronson is clearly at his giddy best when producer Party Supplies throws his iPod on shuffle and flings it into the punchbowl, picking samples that stagger across the lines between "nostalgic," "kitschy," and "I can't even." He loops "Island Girl" of all the Elton John songs in the world; there's whatever banging-on-seashells Sebastian kiddie-calypso is anchoring "It's Me"; and how did we survive a whole subgenre of Solo Cup–toting "frat rap" without someone going full Bluto Blutarsky and just rapping over "Tequila"?

Complex positioned it at number 17 on its list of the 50 best albums of 2013, commenting,

Blue Chips 2 feels like a way for Action to reestablish his brand before the end of 2013—as well as drum up interest for his official debut album in 2014. The project teams Action up again with Party Supplies, after the duo worked wonders for each other last year with the prequel to this project. Action sounds overjoyed about the reunion. Blue Chips 2 is an album so fun it makes us realize how grim so much music in 2013 has been.

Rolling Stone named it the second best mixtape of 2013, saying,

Queens' best ever ex-chef rapper of Albanian descent broke through with last year's Blue Chips and though its sequel could never be quite as revelatory, it did affirm the singularity of the music created by Action Bronson and his production partner, Party Supplies. On Blue Chips 2, they use segments of hits by Tracy Chapman, The Champs, Phil Collins and a host of similarly counterintuitive others as the foundations for Bronson's madcap adventure plots. This is a mixtape as vivid as your favorite cable drama.

Blue Chips 2 was named the fourth best mixtape of 2013 by XXL, which wrote,

He's out here rapping on top of songs that you wouldn't think anyone would be able to rap over, and he's bringing his grimy and hilarious worldview with him. Bronson’s made it a habit to dedicate entire projects to working with one producer—Harry Fraud, Alchemist—and the connection with Party Supplies might be his strongest. At the very least, it's his most entertaining.

Consequence of Sound positioned it at number 28 on its list of the best 50 albums of 2013, saying,

It's rare for a sequel to top the original in any series, but with Blue Chips 2, Action Bronson and Party Supplies did just that, putting out a 19-track mixtape that exhibits the versatility of both artists in an ocean of obscure and entertaining samples and beats. [...] The album isn’t necessarily a game changer, but the two men behind it sure are.

== Track listing ==
No.	Title	Length
1.	"Silverado"	2:00
2.	"Introduction" (featuring Big Body Bes)	1:02
3.	"Pepe Lopez"	1:43
4.	"The Don's Cheek" (sampling Chisato Yamada & Oriental Fantastic Orchestra feat. Takeshi Terauchi's "Daiichigakushō (Torai Shami)")	2:56
5.	"It Concerns Me"	3:43
6.	"Practice"	2:43
7.	"Jackson & Travolta" (featuring Meyhem Lauren)	4:04
8.	"Through the Eyes of a G" (featuring Ab-Soul)	3:02
9.	"Contemporary Man"	4:08
10.	"Twin Peugeots" (featuring Big Body Bes & Mac Miller)	3:18
11.	"Man In the Mirror"	1:17
12.	"Midget Cough"	2:28
13.	"It's Me"	2:20
14.	"Flip Ya" (featuring RetcH)	2:18
15.	"9.24.13" (featuring Big Body Bes)	5:11
16.	"Rolling Thunder"	3:34
17.	"Amadu Diablo"	1:43
18.	"In the City" (featuring Jeff Woods)	3:36
19.	"I Adore You"	1:59
Total length:		53:03
