= Rare Chandeliers =

Mixtape by Action Bronson and The Alchemist
- Released: November 15, 2012
- Recorded: 2012
- Genre: Hip-hop
- Length: 39:50
- Label: Vice Records
- Producer: The Alchemist

Action Bronson chronology
Well-Done (2011)	Rare Chandeliers (2012)	Saaab Stories (2013)

The Alchemist chronology
No Idols (with Domo Genesis) (2012)	Rare Chandeliers (2012)

Singles from Rare Chandeliers
- 1. "The Symbol" Released: October 22, 2012

Professional ratings
Review scores
Source	Rating
Consequence of Sound	3.5/5 stars
Exclaim!	9/10
Pitchfork Media	(7.2/10)

Rare Chandeliers is a collaborative mixtape by American rapper Action Bronson and American producer The Alchemist. It was released on November 15, 2012. Production was handled entirely by The Alchemist. On December 20, a remastered (320 kbit/s MP3 quality) extended version was released for free, as well as a limited edition of Diamond Supply hoodies for sale.

== Track listing ==
- All tracks produced by The Alchemist.

No.	Title	Length
1.	"Big Body Bes Intro" (featuring Big Body Bes)	1:24
2.	"Rare Chandeliers"	2:39
3.	"The Symbol"	3:34
4.	"Sylvester Lundgren" (featuring Meyhem Lauren & AG Da Coroner)	2:32
5.	"Randy, the Musical"	4:24
6.	"Demolition Men" (featuring ScHoolboy Q)	2:32
7.	"Eggs on the Third Floor"	4:09
8.	"Modern Day Revelations" (featuring Roc Marciano)	2:47
9.	"Dennis Haskins"	2:00
10.	"Bitch, I Deserve You" (featuring Evidence)	3:18
11.	"Gateway to Wizardry" (featuring Styles P)	4:18
12.	"Blood of the Goat" (featuring Big Twin & Sean Price)	3:35
13.	"Mike Vick"	2:38
Total length:		39:50

Extended Version
No.	Title	Length
14.	"Fiends Jean Jacket"	2:23
15.	"Drugs & Cheese On A Roll Mix"	2:29
16.	"Brown Bag Wrap"	2:19
Total length:		47:01
