= Most Expensivest =

Television series

- Also known as: Most Expensivest with 2 Chainz
- Genre: Reality
- Presented by: 2 Chainz
- Country of origin: United States
- Original language: English
- No. of seasons: 4
- No. of episodes: 57

Original release
- Network: Vice TV
- Release: November 15, 2017 – April 17, 2023

Most Expensivest is an American reality television series hosted by 2 Chainz. It premiered on Vice TV (formerly known as Viceland) on November 15, 2017 and aired its fourth and latest season in 2023.

== Series overview ==
The series delves into the most expensive items such as food, drinks, and jewelry.

== Episodes ==
=== Season 1 ===
No. overall	No. in season	Title	Runtime	Original Release Date
1	1	Treat Yo' Self	22 mins	Nov 15, 2017
2 Chainz and Action Bronson indulge in a $10,000 steak dinner.
2	2	Bill of Health	22 mins	Nov 22, 2017
Would you pay to breathe air?
3	3	Doggy Style	22 mins	Nov 29, 2017
A $12,000 cake for a dog
4	4	B.O.B.S. (Ballin' Out Brooklyn Style)	22 mins	Dec 6, 2017
Why is Brooklyn so boujee?
5	5	Viva Las Vegas	22 mins	Dec 13, 2017
Caviar and $30 million poker games with Robin Leach.
6	6	High Rollers	22 mins	Dec 20, 2017
Sampling expensive weed with Hannibal Buress and Tommy Chong
7	7	Baecation	22 mins	Dec 27, 2017
Taking your bae on an expensive vacation
8	8	For the 'Gram	22 mins	Jan 3, 2018
Why does 2 Chainz drive a $200,000 Lamborghini? Answer: For the 'gram. With Vic Mensa, Kendra Wilkinson, and DJ Mustard.
9	9	Protect Ya' Neck	22 mins	Jan 10, 2018
Expensive end of the world items with Mr. Las Vegas, Wayne Newton
10	10	Finishing Touches	22 mins	Jan 17, 2018
Expensive finishing touches with Fawnia Mondey

=== Season 2 ===
No. overall	No. in season	Title	Runtime	Original Release Date
11	1	Weedonomics	22 mins	Apr 17, 2018
A look into the innovators of the cannabis industry
12	2	Wet Dream	22 mins	Jul 10, 2018
Mermaid hangout, an underwater jetski, and meeting the Least Expensivest contest winners
13	3	Animal Kingdom	22 mins	Jul 17, 2018
Polo with Trappy and Rick Ross
14	4	High End Love	22 mins	Jul 24, 2018
2 Chainz and Wale look into online dating
15	5	Miami Viceland	22 mins	Jul 31, 2018
Going to the strip club with T.I. and yachting
16	6	Lights Camera Action	22 mins	Aug 7, 2018
The history and future of Hollywood with Jesse Williams
17	7	Mas Carisimo	22 mins	Aug 21, 2018
Latin culture in America with Dos Cadenas
18	8	Retirement	22 mins	Aug 28, 2018
Elderly ballers in Florida
19	9	Celebration of Life	22 mins	Sep 4, 2018
Six figure funerals
20	10	Earth Love	22 mins	Sep 11, 2018
2 Chainz goes glamping
21	11	Fam Life	22 mins	Sep 18, 2018
The "best of the web" episode
22	12	Chainz Bond	22 mins	Sep 25, 2018
Expensive getaway cars, bulletproof suits, and martinis.
23	13	Tru Romance	22 mins	Oct 2, 2018
Trying to buy a private zoo with French Montana
24	14	Snacks On Snacks On Snacks	22 mins	Oct 9, 2018
Expensive food with Diplo and Nyjah Huston

=== Season 3 ===
No. overall	No. in season	Title	Runtime	Original Release Date
25	1	Digi Sex	22 mins	June 11, 2019
Sex toys and BDSM studios with Amber Rose
26	2	Stirring the Pot	22 mins	June 18, 2019
THC butter, a home edible kit, and weed wine.
27	3	Wild Wild West	22 mins	June 25, 2019
A luxury equestrian center with Mark Cuban, and expensive cowboy gear with Erykah Badu.
28	4	Future	22 mins	Jul 2, 2019
Beekeepers and a robotic dog.
29	5	Tech Break	22 mins	Jul 9, 2019
Expensive VR, speakers, supercomputers, and bongs.
30	6	Japantown	22 mins	Jul 16, 2019
Sumo wrestlers, kimonos, ramen, and tea ceremonies with Jerry Rice.
31	7	Off the Grid	22 mins	Jul 23, 2019
Drinking gemstone water with Angela Simmons, and sustainable luxury homes with DJ Bay Bay.
32	8	Tex Mex	22 mins	Jul 30, 2019
Tex-Mex, piñatas, margarita makers, and tequila in Dallas
33	9	Hoedown	22 mins	Aug 6, 2019
Banjos and hot sauce in Texas
34	10	Off the Vine	22 mins	Aug 13, 2019
Everything wine
35	11	Richie Rich	22 mins	May 11, 2020
Pogo sticks, beauty pageants, and dog cloning with 2 Chainz and his kids
36	12	Flex	22 mins	May 18, 2020
Staying at the Palms Hotel and testing a leather dog jacket
37	13	Toni Retreat	22 mins	May 25, 2020
Exploring a weed superstore in Vegas
38	14	Winners	22 mins	June 1, 2020
Working out at the UFC Performance Center and looking at massage chairs and gaming tables.
39	15	Keeping It Tight	22 mins	June 8, 2020
2 Chainz visits Las Vegas' Skyfire Mansion and uses luxury cologne and teeth whitener.
40	16	Life Hacks	22 mins	June 15, 2020
CBD pastries, a portable weed analyzer, and diamond cannagars
41	17	On the Road	22 mins	June 22, 2020
Rims, RVs, tanks, and a portable music studio with the Drench God
42	18	Tru Tailgate	22 mins	June 29, 2020
2 Chainz and the Drench God do high-end tailgating
43	19	Shotgun Wedding	22 mins	July 6, 2020
Vegas weddings
44	20	Lake Life	22 mins	July 13, 2020
Motorized surfboards, fishing rods, and hot tubs

=== Season 4 ===
No. overall	No. in season	Title	Runtime	Original Release Date
45	1	High Notes	22 mins	Feb 13, 2023
Expensive musical instruments with Joe Bonamassa, Hit-Boy, and Angelo Moore
46	2	Roll Up	22 mins	Feb 20, 2023
Lowriders, skateboards, and everything else on wheels with Too Short and Deon Cole
47	3	G.O.A.T.s	22 mins	Feb 27, 2023
The greatest collections of all time
48	4	Geeked Out	22 mins	Mar 6, 2023
Smart collectors and their expensive collections
49	5	Hollywood and HIGHland	22 mins	Mar 13, 2023
Hollywood collections with Sarah Silverman and Kenya Barris
50	6	Kidy Boi	22 mins	Mar 20, 2023
Toy and games collections
51	7	$how$topper$	22 mins	Mar 27, 2023
Collections for shows with Mark Mothersbaugh and Savion Glover
52	8	Big Apple Ballin'	22 mins	Apr 3, 2023
Collections from the richest of the rich in New York City
53	9	Party Poppin'	22 mins	Apr 10, 2023
Crazy parties with Timbaland
54	10	Hidden Gems	22 mins	Apr 17, 2023
New York City's secret treasures
