= Big Body Bes =

American rapper

- Also known as: Big Body Bes
- Born: Besnik E. Sadikay; August 26, 1983 (age 42); Brooklyn, New York, United States
- Genres: Hip hop; spoken word
- Occupations: Rapper; TV presenter
- Years active: 2011–present

Besnik E. Sadikay (Albanian pronunciation: [ˈbɛsnik 'sadikaj]; born August 26, 1983), better known by the stage name Big Body Bes is an American rapper and TV presenter. He is best known for his association with Action Bronson, who describes Bes as his "Albanian cousin". He has been heavily featured on Action Bronson's musical and television projects.

== Early life ==
Bes was born in New York City to Albanian parents who immigrated from southern part of Albania in 1983. He was raised in the quiet Lindenwood section of New York City. Bes met future collaborators Meyhem Lauren and Action Bronson at the age of 15. Bes received the nickname "Big Body" due to his chronic obesity.

== Career ==
Bes began his music career in 2011 at the age of 27, on Action Bronson's debut album Dr. Lecter with his forte of spoken word, a strong composition of the elements of NYC street life, economic struggle and barbaric humor. Bes rejects the notion that he's a "hypeman" or that his features on Bronson's songs are "skits", going as far as to say "...I wouldn’t even call them features, I would call them experiences". He considers his "breakout" appearance to be his feature on "9-24-11" off Bronson's mixtape Blue Chips.

Starting in 2016, Bes has also been on a TV show called Traveling the Stars: Action Bronson and Friends Watch 'Ancient Aliens'. Other hosts include Action Bronson, Knxwledge, ScHoolboy Q, Earl Sweatshirt, Tyler, The Creator, Andy Milonakis, Dirt Nasty, MC Eiht, The Alchemist, Eric André, Too $hort, and Melissa Etheridge. In the first episode of the series, Bes declares he doesn't believe in dinosaurs.

== Discography ==
=== Studio albums ===
- Body Language (TBA)

=== Guest appearances ===
List of non-single guest appearances, with other performing artists, showing year released and album name
| Title | Year | Artist(s) | Album |
|---|---|---|---|
| "Respect the Mustache" | 2011 | Action Bronson, Statik Selektah | Well-Done |
| "Peruvian Desserts" | 2012 | Meyhem Lauren, Action Bronson, Roc Marciano | Respect the Fly Shit |
| "9-24-11" | 2012 | Action Bronson | Blue Chips |
| "Big Body Bes Intro" | 2012 | Action Bronson, The Alchemist | Rare Chandeliers |
| "72 Virgins" | 2013 | Action Bronson | Saaab Stories |
| "Reloaded" | 2013 | Statik Selektah, Pain in Da Ass, Action Bronson, Termanology, Tony Touch | Extended Play |
| "Watersports" | 2013 | Action Bronson | —N/a |
| "Introduction" | 2013 | Action Bronson, Party Supplies | Blue Chips 2 |
| "Twin Peugeots" | 2013 | Action Bronson, Party Supplies, Mac Miller | Blue Chips 2 |
| "9.24.13" | 2013 | Action Bronson, Party Supplies | Blue Chips 2 |
| "The Rising" | 2015 | Action Bronson | Mr. Wonderful |
| "Falconry" | 2015 | Action Bronson, Meyhem Lauren | Mr. Wonderful |
| "Badmon Ting" | 2016 | Meyhem Lauren | Piatto D'Oro |
| "Bonus Round" | 2016 | Meyhem Lauren, Action Bronson, Roc Marciano | Piatto D'Oro |
| "Boomerang" | 2017 | Jay Worthy, The Alchemist, Polo100 | Fantasy Island |
| "Brother Jedidiah" | 2017 | The Alchemist, Budgie, Action Bronson | The Good Book Vol. 2 |
| "Tank" | 2017 | Action Bronson | Blue Chips 7000 |
| "Durag vs. Headband" | 2017 | Action Bronson | Blue Chips 7000 |
| "Fulton Street Interlude" | 2017 | Harry Fraud | The Coast |
| "Lexus in the Lobby" | 2018 | Meyhem Lauren, Hologram | Glass |
| "Ring Ring" | 2018 | Action Bronson | White Bronco |
| "Uptown Aquarium" | 2019 | The Alchemist | Yacht Rock 2 |
| "Root of Evil" | 2020 | Meyhem Lauren | Glass 2.0 |
| "Islamic Excellence" | 2020 | The Alchemist | The Food Villain |

== Filmography ==
| Year | Title | Notes |
|---|---|---|
| 2016–2020 | Fuck, That's Delicious | |
| 2016, 2019 | Traveling the Stars: Action Bronson and Friends Watch Ancient Aliens | |

== Videography ==
| Year | Song title | Artist(s) |
|---|---|---|
| 2015 | "Baby Blue" | Action Bronson featuring Chance the Rapper |
| 2016 | "Badmon Ting" | Meyham Lauren featuring Big Body Bes |
