= Well-Done (album) =

Studio album by Action Bronson and Statik Selektah
- Released: November 22, 2011
- Recorded: 2011
- Studio: Showoff Basement (Brooklyn, NYC)
- Genre: Hip-hop
- Length: 47:50
- Label: DCide; ShowOff; Switchblade
- Producer: Statik Selektah

Action Bronson chronology
Dr. Lecter (2011)	Well-Done (2011)	Mr. Wonderful (2015)

Statik Selektah chronology
Population Control (2011)	Well-Done (2011)	2012 (2012)

Singles from Well-Done
- 1. "Cocoa Butter" Released: October 25, 2011

Well-Done is a collaborative studio album by American rapper Action Bronson and hip-hop record producer DJ Statik Selektah. It was released on November 22, 2011 through DCide/ShowOff Records with distribution via Switchblade Music. Produced entirely by Statik Selektah, it features guest appearances from Meyhem Lauren, AG Da Coroner, Lil' Fame, Maffew Ragazino and Nina Sky. The album was supported with a single "Cocoa Butter".

== Critical reception ==
Professional ratings
Aggregate scores
Source	Rating
Metacritic	79/100
Review scores
Source	Rating
AllHipHop	8/10
AllMusic	3.5/5 stars
Entertainment Weekly	B
HipHopDX	3.5/5
Pitchfork	7.1/10
RapReviews	7.5/10
XXL	XL (4/5)

Well-Done was met with universal acclaim from music critics. At Metacritic, which assigns a normalized rating out of 100 to reviews from mainstream publications, the album received an average score of 79 based on eight reviews.

Jesse Gissen of XXL praised the album, resuming: "once they digest this one, fans will be eager for seconds". Pedro 'DJ Complejo' Hernandez of RapReviews called the album "a shining example of what collaborative albums should be". Jayson Greene of Pitchfork wrote: "Bronson's biggest strengths are a goofy sense of humor and a refreshing lack of self-regard: at its best, Well-Done is like spending 45 minutes with the affable, roly-poly guy who cracked you up at your high school lunch table". AllMusic's Jon O'Brien stated: "adhering to the old-school MC/producer approach, Well-Done is a promising and cohesive affair which proves Bronson has the raw talent to match his much talked about appetite".

== Track listing ==
No.	Title	Length
1.	"Respect the Mustache"	3:05
2.	"Time for Some" (featuring Lil' Fame)	4:28
3.	"Cocoa Butter" (featuring Nina Sky)	4:44
4.	"White Silk"	2:54
5.	"Keep Off the Grass"	3:06
6.	"The Stick Up"	2:59
7.	"Central Bookings" (featuring Meyhem Lauren)	3:23
8.	"Cirque du Soleil"	2:04
9.	"The Rainmaker"	3:17
10.	"Love Letter"	2:01
11.	"Not Enough Words"	3:16
12.	"Terror Death Camp" (featuring Meyhem Lauren, Maffew Ragazino and AG da Coroner)	3:25
13.	"Miss Fordham Road (86' 87' 88')"	3:39
14.	"Cliff Notes"	3:13
15.	"Bon Voyage"	2:16
Total length:		47:50

Notes

- "Respect the Mustache" features uncredited vocals by Big Body Bes
