= List of people from Queens =

Queens neighborhoods
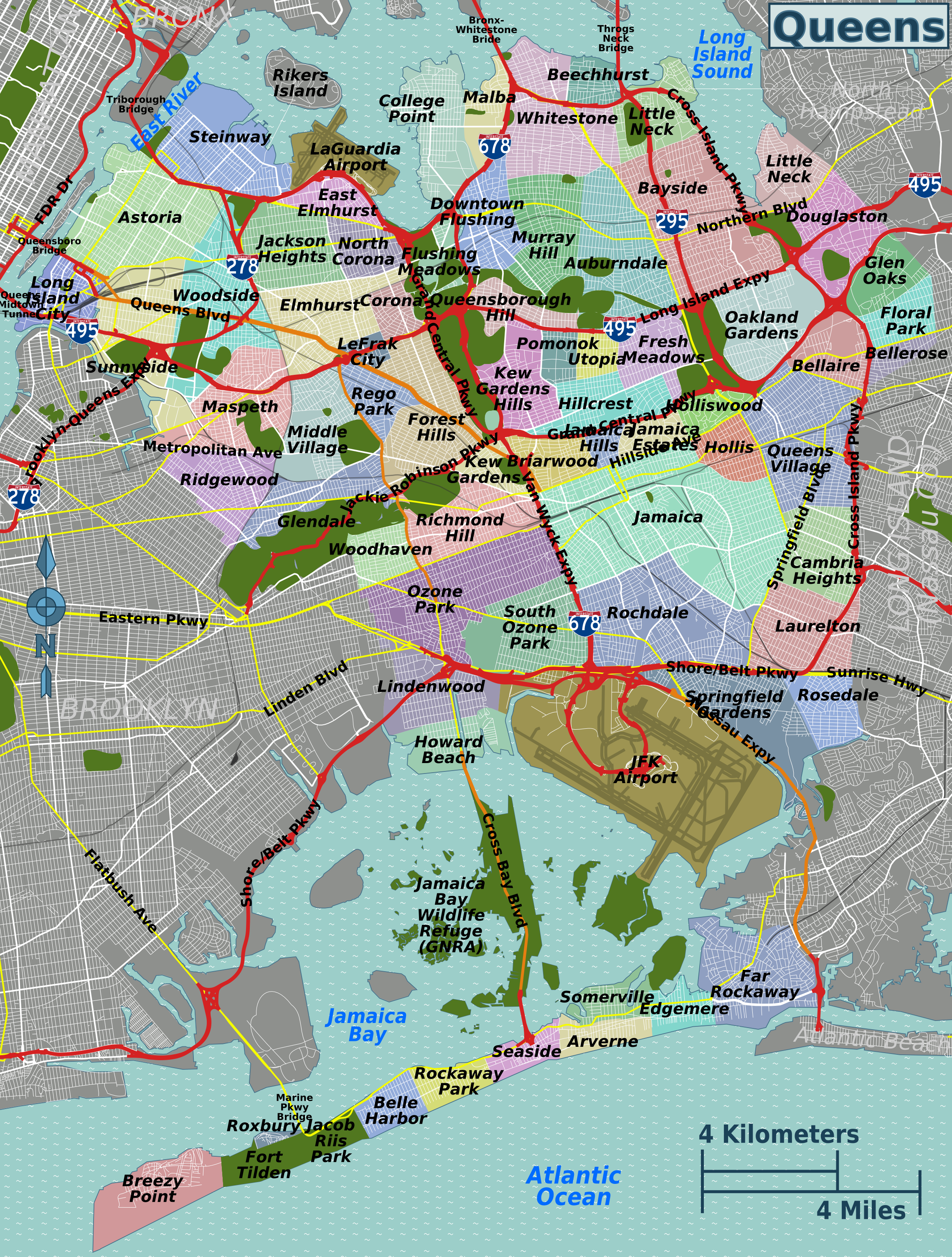

This is a collection of links to "Notable people" sections of Queens neighborhood articles.

== Notable people: neighborhood links ==
Northwestern Queens

1. Astoria § Notable people
  1. § Born in Astoria
  2. § Raised in or moved to Astoria
  3. § Grave sites
2. Jackson Heights § Notable residents
3. Long Island City § Notable people
  1. Queensbridge Houses § Notable people
4. Sunnyside § Notable people

Northeastern Queens

5. Bayside § Notable people
6. Bellerose § Notable people
7. College Point § Notable people
8. Douglaston–Little Neck § Notable residents
9. Flushing § Notable people
10. Floral Park, New York § Queens
  1. § Notable people
11. Glen Oaks § Notable people
  1. North Shore Towers § Notable visitors
12. Pomonok § Notable people
13. Whitestone § Notable people
  1. Beechhurst § Notable people

Central Queens

13. Briarwood § Notable residents
14. Corona § Notable residents
  1. LeFrak City § Notable residents
15. East Elmhurst § Notable people
16. Elmhurst § Notable residents
17. Forest Hills § Notable people
18. Glendale § Notable people
19. Kew Gardens Hills § Notable residents
20. Maspeth § Notable people
21. Middle Village § Notable people
22. Rego Park § Notable residents
23. Ridgewood § Notable people
24. Woodside § Notable residents

Southeastern Queens

25. Cambria Heights § Notable residents
26. Hollis § Notable people
27. Jamaica § Notable residents
  1. Jamaica Estates § Notable residents
28. Laurelton § Notable residents
29. Queens Village § Notable residents
30. Rosedale § Notable residents
31. South Jamaica § Notable residents
32. Springfield Gardens (Brookville) § Notable residents
33. St. Albans § Notable people

Southwestern Queens

34. Howard Beach § Notable people
35. Ozone Park § Notable people
36. Richmond Hill § Notable residents
37. Woodhaven § Notable residents

The Rockaways

38. § Notable people by neighborhood
  1. § Breezy Point
  2. § Far Rockaway
  3. § Rockaway Beach

== Links to categories and lists ==
1. Category:People from Queens
2. Category:People from Queens, by neighborhood
3. Category:Lists of people from New York City
  1. List of people from New York City
    1. § People from New York City
    2. § Non-native New Yorkers
4. List of Queens neighborhoods
