= Saaab Stories =

EP by Action Bronson
- Released: June 11, 2013
- Recorded: 2012–13
- Genre: Hip hop
- Length: 25:11
- Label: Vice; Atlantic
- Producer: Harry Fraud

Action Bronson chronology
Rare Chandeliers (2012)	Saaab Stories (2013)	Blue Chips 2 (2013)

Singles from Saaab Stories
- 1. "Strictly 4 My Jeeps" Released: May 14, 2013

Saaab Stories is the second extended play (EP) by American rapper Action Bronson. The EP was released on June 11, 2013, and is entirely produced by American record producer Harry Fraud. The EP, which was distributed by Vice and Atlantic Records, serves as Bronson's major label debut project. It was recorded from 2012 to 2013. It features guest appearances from fellow American rappers Wiz Khalifa, Prodigy and Raekwon. "Strictly 4 My Jeeps" was released as the album's lead and sole single on the 14th of May, 2013.

== Background ==
On April 18, 2012, Harry Fraud announced that he would be releasing a collaborative album with Action Bronson in the summer of 2012, saying "Right now we have enough material for two projects. We’re definitely going to do an LP. Right now it’s called Saab Stories—Saab as in the automobile company. You can lookout for it in the summertime. Already we’ve got records and features on there that are going to have people blown away at the fact that we’re working with these artists. We have shit on there that they’re not even ready for. We got a lot of surprises." On May 30, 2013, the album cover and track listing were released revealing guest appearances from Big Body Bes, Wiz Khalifa, Prodigy and Raekwon.

== Release and promotion ==
On May 14, 2013, the first single from the EP "Strictly 4 My Jeeps" was released. Six days later, the music video was released for "Strictly 4 My Jeeps". On May 19, 2013, Action Bronson announced on his Twitter account that he was finishing up the album, saying it would be released in June 2013. On May 22, 2013, Action Bronson announced that the EP would be released on June 11, 2013.

== Critical response ==
Professional ratings
Aggregate scores
Source	Rating
Metacritic	71/100
Review scores
Source	Rating
AllMusic	3.5/5 stars
Consequence of Sound	3/5 stars
Exclaim!	(7/10)
HipHopDX	4/5 stars
Pitchfork Media	(6.1/10)
Respect.	(positive)
Tiny Mix Tapes	2.5/5 stars
XXL	(XL)

Saaab Stories was met with generally positive reviews from music critics. At Metacritic, which assigns a normalized rating out of 100 to reviews from mainstream critics, the album received an average score of 71, based on 9 reviews, indicating "generally favorable reviews". Chris Bosman of Consequence of Sound gave the album three out of five stars, saying "With such a limited amount of time to work with on SAAAB Stories, it’s a disappointment that Bronson chose to cede time to a cast that, with the exception of Prodigy and Raekwon, doesn’t live up to Bronsolinio. Instead, we get a Harry Fraud production showcase, with limited Action highlights — a moderately enjoyable listen that’s nasty, but unsatisfying." Chris Dart of Exclaim! gave the album a seven out of ten, saying "If you were hoping Action Bronson's major label debut, SAAAB Stories, would be another Blue Chips, you're going to be a little disappointed. Sure, he's still using food as a metaphor for just about everything and referencing obscure athletes, but his delivery is slower and more deliberate than on most of his previous outings. The lush instrumentals from Harry Fraud don't lend themselves to the sort of liquid wordplay present on Bronson's earlier efforts. Instead, the whole thing gets darker and more ominous; his threats and boasts take on a new edge. It's not that Bronson is less lyrical than before, it's just that everything is more measured."

Ian Cohen of Pitchfork Media gave the album a 6.1 out of 10, saying "It was barely a year ago when Bronson was predicating his career on something other than being as unlikeable as possible, so there’s hope he isn’t too far gone. But on the grim, vulgar Saaab Stories, what you see is what you get." David Jeffries of AllMusic gave the album three and a half stars out of five, saying "The whole EP is dude's night on a doo-doo level, and while that's always been a part of the whole Bronson package, it's strange to emphasize it on his first major release. Fans who like him reckless should check it, but for the full picture, start elsewhere." David "Rek" Lee of HipHopDX gave the album four out of five stars, saying "Overall, Saaab Stories is the meeting of two artists who push the old Hip Hop formulas to new places unlike other ‘90s era revivalist types who would rather cling on. The last entry in the EP, "Seven Series Triplets" is evidence of that as Harry Fraud provides that darkness while Action raps nonchalant among two New York legends."

Dan Rys of XXL gave the album an XL, saying "Saaab Stories isn't entirely dark—with Bronson, it never will be—and "No Time" and "Strictly 4 My Jeeps" offer up vivid quips and tongue-in-cheek references. "The Rockers" is a great example of this, where a shout out to an insignificant ’90s professional wrestler becomes an enthralling hook. It’s the second half of "Alligator" where Bronsolino takes his usual subject matter and flips it into a realm that he rarely visits. It's not that he's never alluded to pain and hardships before, but he's never done it so hopelessly and without a hint of his goofball charm or a sly smile aimed toward redemption of some sort. It's jarring and compelling, and it opens the door to a whole other planet of possibilities for him. It's this track that makes it clear: Action Bronson's no longer the one-dimensional rapper sucking on the G-Pen and laughing to himself in the corner while carving up a cheesesteak. He's got a depth to him that's beginning to emerge with regularity. It bodes well for the future." Sean Delanty of Tiny Mix Tapes gave the album two and a half stars out of five, saying "Saaab Stories largely feels like a missed opportunity; Harry Fraud's contributions offered Bronson a platform to take his work to a whole new level, but the lyrics on most of these songs see the rapper miring in status quo mediocrity, plateauing rather than progressing."

HipHopDX named it one of the top 25 best albums of 2013 saying, "Saaab Stories is a prayer from the streets being answered—a real Rap album in real Rap's most dire of times."

== Commercial performance ==
The album debuted at number 63 on the Billboard 200 chart, with first-week sales of 7,600 copies in the United States.

== Track listing ==
- All songs produced by Harry Fraud.

No.	Title	Length
1.	"72 Virgins" (featuring Big Body Bes)	2:49
2.	"Triple Backflip"	2:51
3.	"No Time"	4:36
4.	"The Rockers" (featuring Wiz Khalifa)	3:08
5.	"Strictly 4 My Jeeps"	2:45
6.	"Alligator"	5:31
7.	"Seven Series Triplets" (featuring Prodigy & Raekwon)	3:31
Total length:		25:11

== Charts ==
Chart (2013)	Peak position
UK R&B Albums (OCC)	4
US Billboard 200	63
US Top R&B/Hip-Hop Albums	9
US Top Rap Albums	6
