= Fuck, That's Delicious =

American television documentary series

- Genre: Food; Travel
- Starring: Action Bronson; Alchemist; Big Body Bes; Meyhem Lauren
- Country of origin: United States
- Original language: English
- No. of seasons: 4
- No. of episodes: 44

Production
- Executive producers: Action Bronson; Lauren Cynamon; Chris Grosso; Paul Rosenberg; Suroosh Alvi
- Running time: 30 minutes (seasons 1-4); 9-14 minutes (season 5-present)

Original release
- Network: Viceland (seasons 1–4); YouTube (season 5–present)
- Release: March 3, 2016 – present

Fuck, That's Delicious (also known by the censored title F*ck, That's Delicious or simply That's Delicious) is an American television food documentary series starring rapper, and former chef, Action Bronson. The series premiered on March 3, 2016, on Viceland. The series focuses on "the life and eating habits of rap's greatest bon vivant".

Fuck, That's Delicious follows Action Bronson as he travels around the world, visits various restaurants, and eats everything from street food to fine cuisine. The series regularly features Bronson's friends and fellow rappers, Meyhem Lauren, Alchemist, and Big Body Bes, as well as numerous world-renowned chefs. Four seasons have aired on cable television, with the fourth season airing from May 11, 2020, to July 20, 2020.

In March 2021, Bronson announced the fifth season of Fuck, That's Delicious as a fully independent and self-funded production, no longer airing on Viceland, nor having Alchemist, Meyhem and Bes regularly appearing. Unlike the past four seasons, which saw Bronson visiting restaurants, this season explores his current lifestyle of fitness, while also showcasing some of his own cooking, particularly for his friends. The fifth season's first episode premiered on Bronson's YouTube channel on March 17, 2021.

== Development ==
Fuck, That's Delicious began as a web series under Vice Media's "Munchies" banner ; the first episode was published on the Munchies channel on May 6, 2014. The series can be seen as a spiritual successor to Bronson's previous food web series Action in the Kitchen.

Notable celebrities, from the food industry and otherwise, who have appeared on Fuck, That's Delicious include Daniel Boulud, Michael Voltaggio, Michael White, Mario Batali, Steve Bunce and Jonah Hill.

== Episodes ==
=== Series overview ===
Season	Episodes		Originally released	
Season	Episodes		First released	Last released
1	8		March 3, 2016	April 21, 2016
2	13		September 1, 2016	April 20, 2017
3	10		July 10, 2018	September 11, 2018
4	11		May 11, 2020	July 20, 2020
5	8		March 17, 2021	July 26, 2021
6	14	9	May 5, 2022	March 20, 2023
6	14	5	April 11, 2023	TBA

=== Season 1 (2016) ===
No. overall	No. in season	Title	Original release date
1	1	"Multiculturalism at Its Best"	March 3, 2016
Action stops in DC, Atlanta, and Miami, eats in the hottest restaurant in the country, samples true southern BBQ, and learns how to make a new bay scallop and papaya dish.
2	2	"New Friends in Strange Places"	March 10, 2016
Driven by a need for the freshest salmon, most grass-fed lamb, and legal weed, Action makes a pit-stop in the Pacific Northwest en route to a concert in Vancouver.
3	3	"Culinary Athleticism"	March 17, 2016
Handball court pizza parties, Guyanese juice spots, the best falafel in NYC and a flute performance at a Pakistani restaurant make this the best episode of food television in NYC.
4	4	"The Foundation"	March 24, 2016
With hyper-local meat centric dining in the UK, deli sandwiches in East New York, and Thai food in Amsterdam, FTD proves it is in a league of its own.
5	5	"The Showdown in Lamb Alley"	March 31, 2016
Action and crew decide to head to Morocco. Inspired by lamb and leather, they head out to the markets to find the most succulent tagines, artisanal giraffe dolls, and instruments.
6	6	"Sidelined in the Yukon"	April 7, 2016
A concert in Alaska, fly fishing, eating with an Eskimo, and buying as much Carhartt gear as possible. Also some emergency surgery.
7	7	"Long Time Friends"	April 14, 2016
After a lifetime of eating Jamaican food in Queens, it's time for the real thing. Action and Meyhem go to Jamaica for the jerk chicken and a music video for Meyhem's new single.
8	8	"Can't Forget Paris"	April 21, 2016
The season ends with two sold out shows in Paris, between which Action and company visit a cultural heritage site, fly in a wind tunnel, and eat the best veggie burger in the world.

=== Season 2 (2016–17) ===
No. overall	No. in season	Title	Original release date
9	1	"In the Garden, to the Moon"	September 1, 2016
In Melbourne, Action and Meyhem try simple Italian fare. In Sydney, appetites for fried chicken and natural wine reach new heights. Bronson cooks with renowned chef Ben Shewry.
10	2	"The Other City by the Sea"	September 8, 2016
Where does Action Bronson go to dive for razor fish, learn a new wagyu beef recipe, and cruise in a drop-top Cadillac? The answer: the most isolated city in the world-Perth!
11	3	"My Fair Bagel"	September 15, 2016
Action Bronson makes his mighty return to Auckland, introducing Meyhem to his favorite burger truck. Between bagels and pork shanks, he debuts a new song in a sweaty strip club.
12	4	"The Gang's All Here"	September 22, 2016
The whole crew is reunited in Hawaii in a celebration of short ribs and boogie boarding. Big Body Bes and The Alchemist bring their Ying Yang.
13	5	"Ancient Feelings Stirred"	September 29, 2016
FTD hits Barcelona in a whirlwind. While Action performs at a huge music festival, the crew learns Flamenco. Meyhem and Action go head-to-head in a paella cook-off.
14	6	"The Caesar Brothers"	October 6, 2016
The best food TV ever filmed on the Italian Peninsula. The crew starts at the world's best restaurant, samples shellfish in Naples, and eats Roman street food with Mario Batali.
15	7	"A Love Like Wine"	October 13, 2016
Roskilde Festival brings the crew to Copenhagen. Action creates an Octopus Taco, Meyhem cooks fish, and Al is on his best behavior.
16	8	"Durag vs. Bronco"	October 20, 2016
Action is in LA, shooting a video that features Big Body Bes on a white horse. When not engaged in equine rap scenarios, they are eating their way from West Hollywood to Watts.
17	9	"A New York Winter Fling"	January 5, 2017
Let Action Bronson show you how to eat on a winter's day. On this episode the FTD crew take on a culinary world tour while never leaving NYC.
18	10	"Bay Area Romp"	January 12, 2017
Legendary Soul Food, Explosive Chicken, A Love Filled Burmese Restaurant, inventive California Cuisine, and Beer. We got it all on this episode of FTD.
19	11	"Everybody Loves Chicago"	January 19, 2017
The cast of FTD thoroughly indulges in all of Chicago's culinary offerings. Action and the gang hit up everything from Michelin starred restaurants to Polish festivals.
20	12	"Japan, Here We Come"	January 26, 2017
Action and the gang spend some time in Tokyo. Meyhem and Alchemist eat blowfish, Action visits a world-class kitchen, and the whole gang hits up a spicy food festival.
21	13	"420 Special"	April 20, 2017
FTD is back, and they are ready to eat! Action Bronson and his crew tour NYC for the best Italian in Brooklyn, 24 Hour Seafood in Harlem, and Big Body's famous shawarma fries.

=== Season 3 (2018) ===
No. overall	No. in season	Title	Original release date
22	1	"Queens: A Food Thug's Paradise"	July 10, 2018
Action Bronson and his crew show us how a simple stroll under the 7 Train in Queens can yield incredibly delicious results.
23	2	"New Jersey (Food) Drive"	July 17, 2018
Action and the fellas head to New Jersey to dine at the Garden State's finest family-owned eateries.
24	3	"The Restaurant Takeover"	July 24, 2018
The whole cast of FTD runs a restaurant, with Action as the chef, Meyhem bar tending, Big Body the Maître D', and The Alchemist waiting tables. If only it was that easy.
25	4	"Food Court Kings"	July 31, 2018
The FTD gang tackles every aspect of dining at malls. Action starts the day with a food court pizza stampede in Queens and ends it with Indian ice cream at a strip mall in Jersey.
26	5	"The Best Caribbean Food in New York City"	August 7, 2018
Take a tour of the Caribbean without leaving NYC. From fried shrimp prepared with a machete to beef patties so good you take them to Miami, Action covers it all.
27	6	"New York Summer in the Winter"	August 14, 2018
Action Bronson and the crew go fishing with hot dogs, have a lobster cook off, and surf in the snow. It doesn't have to be warm to enjoy the summer in the winter.
28	7	"The Art of Food Pairings"	August 21, 2018
If pairing wine with food is an art, then consider this episode a masterpiece. The guys drink their way around town, from donut shops to Thai food in a tattoo parlor.
29	8	"Specialty Food Items"	August 28, 2018
Ever wonder about caviar on fried chicken? Do you suck the head on a live spotted prawn? Watch and learn!
30	9	"Mind and Body Healing Part 1"	September 4, 2018
Action and Meyhem need to get some exercise, so they try new fitness regimens. Special appearances from Diamond Dallas Page, Matt Sera, and John Basedow.
31	10	"Mind and Body Healing Part 2"	September 11, 2018
The FTD crew takes wellness to a new level and visits Alex and Allison Grey's Chapel of the Sacred Mirrors, to heal their souls with art. Meanwhile, The Alchemist makes a sandwich.

=== Season 4 (2020) ===
No. overall	No. in season	Title	Original release date
32	1	"All American Food"	May 11, 2020
Action and his crew are eating all across New York City to celebrate delicious foods that are uniquely American including a lavish multi-course surf and turf spread, loaded Italian hero sandwiches and inventive ice cream creations.
33	2	"The Many Flavors of Harlem"	May 18, 2020
We are in Harlem eating fried fish so good you won't know your name after the first bite, and Jamaican food so crazy you won't be able to get out of the car.
34	3	"Two for One's in NYC"	May 25, 2020
Action and the gang give you two places in three of their favorite neighborhoods in NYC. Pizza and vegan Jamaican, wine and tacos, and a Peking duck so nice they had it twice.
35	4	"A Spanish Wine Tour"	June 1, 2020
Action sends Meyhem and The Alchemist on the wine journey of a lifetime around Spain. Starting in Catalonian country and finishing their journey in Madrid.
36	5	"Back in Paris"	June 8, 2020
Action and crew take Paris by storm eating and drinking at all the new instant classics. French breakfast with an Asian twist, yakitori tasting menus, and boozy bistrot lunches.
37	6	"Irish Tacos and Jerk Lamb"	June 15, 2020
All the best Mexican, Jamaican, and cheese you expect from a food show in Dublin, with guest chef Nico Reynolds from RTÉ cookery show Grill Seeker.
38	7	"The Wild Flavors of London"	June 22, 2020
Action Bronson, Meyhem Lauren, and The Alchemist get right to the point of London food; Turkish kebabs, nouveaux Indian, boxing pubs with Steve Bunce, and some Nigerian with a side of friendship.
39	8	"America's Food Capital"	June 29, 2020
Watching this episode may cause you take your clothes off and lick the screen. We got hoagies, pizza, many flavors from Israel, and a block party- the Philly, FTD Style!
40	9	"Iconic Food: NY, Boston, Connecticut, and LA"	July 6, 2020
The crew chows its way through American history, covering legendary foods and the people who make it from New York, Los Angeles, Connecticut and Boston.
41	10	"Bronx to Farm Cuisine"	July 13, 2020
The crew hangs out in the Bronx and makes mozzarella, gets an Albanian history lesson, and then heads upstate.
42	11	"Kosovo"	July 20, 2020
Mayhem and Alchemist join Action as he reconnects with his family in Kosovo; the gang quickly become hometown heroes and indulge in recipes from Action's beloved grandma.

=== Season 5 (2021) ===
No. overall	No. in season	Title	Original release date
43	1	"Stuffed Galama in the Gym Parking Lot"	March 17, 2021
Action Bronson kicks it off with his trainer Dave Paladino, commemorating his fitness revolution with a meal that was passed down to Dave from his mother: Stuffed calamari, Sicilian style...
44	2	"Bam Bam and CC's Torture Chamber"	March 31, 2021
Bronson spends Sunday morning working out with Hall of Fame pitcher C.C. Sabathia, before heading to the handball courts to cook two prime bone-in filets for himself and one of his longtime friends.
45	3	"The Best Olive Oil and Body Boarding Video Ever"	April 14, 2021
Action and his friend/collaborator, the world's top olive oil expert Nick Coleman, take you on an incredible journey of understanding olive oil from the root, and understanding life.
46	4	"Inside NYC's Best Pizzeria with Action Bronson"	April 29, 2021
47	5	"Chocolate is the Most Exotic Fruit"	May 14, 2021
48	6	"The Greatest Bagel on Earth"	May 26, 2021
49	7	"Training Day with Action Bronson "	July 14, 2021
Action trains with a variety of athletes, from UFC legends to world class Jiu-Jitsu experts, before taking them to Uncle Paulie's Deli in West Hollywood for a taste of New York.
50	8	"Action Bronson and the World's Strongest Lamb Burger "	July 26, 2021
Action works out with professional strongman Martins Licis, before enjoying a post-workout meal at the LA-based Indian restaurant Badmaash.

=== Season 6 (2022-23) ===
No. overall	No. in season	Title	Original release date
Part 1
51	1	"Action Bronson at NYC's Best Bakery"	May 5, 2022
Action Bronson spends time at the New York City-based restaurant La Bicyclette, where baker FLO makes what Action calls "the best baguette on the planet".
52	2	"The Best Coffee in New York City with Action Bronson"	May 27, 2022
Action tours New York City to taste some of the best coffee known to man and woman.
53	3	"Rare Cheese Tastings and Strength Training at the Rap Concert with Action Bronson and The Alchemist"	June 15, 2022
While on tour, Action and The Alchemist stop in New York City to partake in a backstage tasting of rare cheese, and also enjoy a burger from Smashed, a restaurant on the Lower East Side.
54	4	"Action Bronson's 2nd Annual FTD Block Party in Brooklyn"	January 9, 2023
Action hosts his second annual Fuck, That's Delicious block party in Brooklyn, New York; where a variety of food is served to Brooklyn residents.
55	5	"The Best Cannoli in New York City with Action Bronson"	January 23, 2023
Action visits Fortunato Brothers Bakery to learn from co-owner Biagio Fortunato on how the best cannoli in New York City are made.
56	6	"The Never Ending Top Dishes of NYC"	February 6, 2023
In the first installment of his Never Ending Top Ten sub-series, Action visits three of the best restaurants in New York City.
57	7	"Rare Brazilian Beef at a Mom and Pop Butcher Shop"	February 20, 2023
Action travels to Long Island, where he treats the residents to an impromptu barbecue on the sidewalk. He also attempts to grill rare Cupim beef, as well as a kebab on a chicken rotisserie skewer.
58	8	"The Never Ending Top Dishes of NYC, Part 2 "	March 6, 2023
The second installment of Action's Never Ending Top Ten sub-series sees him once again visits another three of the best restaurants in New York City, eating a variety of food including Guatemalan cuisine.
59	9	"The Never Ending Top Dishes of NYC, Part 3 "	March 20, 2023
Action is joined with Nick Baglivo of L'Industrie Pizza to visit a new range of restaurants around New York City.
Part 2
60	10	"Action Bronson Finds the Best Pizza and Kebabs in Boston"	April 11, 2023
While celebrating the release of his New Balance sneaker collaboration in Boston, Action visits Santarpio's Pizza, in which he tries not only the pizza, but the restaurant's other choices of food including the lamb and sausage BBQ skewers.
61	11	"Champagne and New York City's Best Burger with Action Bronson"	April 24, 2023
Action visits his old friend Billy Durney at the Red Hook Tavern, where Billy's team treats Action to champagne and a variety of food, including his restaurant's legendary cheeseburger.
62	12	"Action Bronson Tries NYC's Newest Pizza Obsession with Chef Wylie Dufresne"	May 8, 2023
Action visits acclaimed chef Wylie Dufresne at his newly opened pizzeria Stretch, where he is treated to a smorgasbord of modern pizzeria delights.
63	13	"Feasting in New York with Action Bronson, Marlon “Chito” Vera, Alchemist & Larry June"	May 22, 2023
Action invites fellow musicians The Alchemist and Larry June to join him in trying the cooking outfit LEV's pop-up food event. Action is later joined by Marlon Vera to feast on some food and wine.
64	14	"Discovering NYC Food Secrets Under the 7 Train"	June 5, 2023
Action visits three food spots within a one-mile radius in Queens, New York.
