= Meyhem Lauren =

American rapper (born 1983)

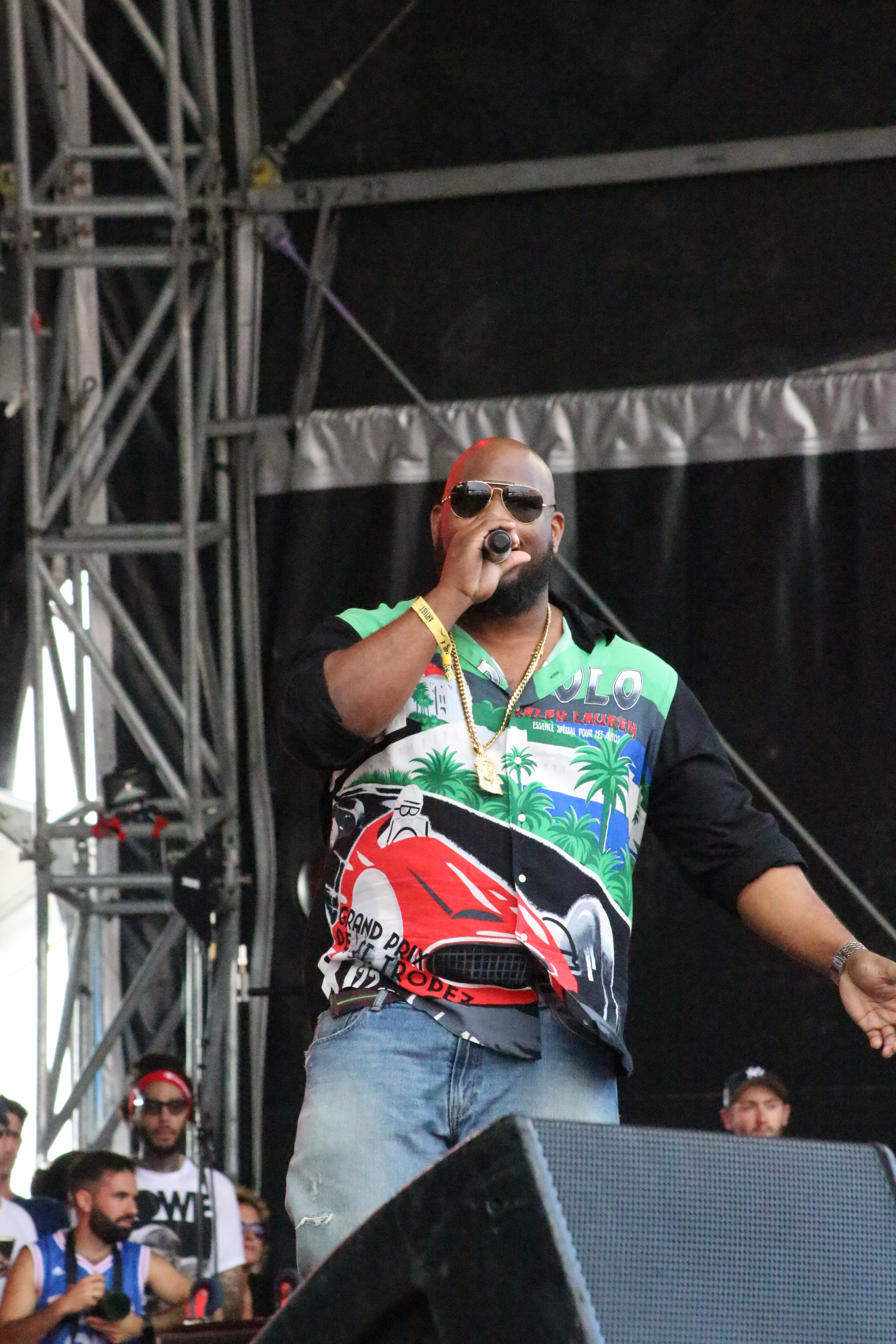
- Meyhem Lauren in 2017

Background information
- Also known as: Meyhem
- Born: James Rencher; May 14, 1983 (age 43)
- Origin: Queens, New York City, U.S.
- Genres: Hip-hop
- Occupation: Rapper
- Years active: 2004–present
- Labels: Fool's Gold; Greedhead; Mishka
- Website: www.meyhemlauren.com

James Rencher (born May 14, 1983), known professionally as Meyhem Lauren, is an American rapper from Queens, New York. He is a founding member of the Smart Crew collective. He has collaborated with the likes of DJ Muggs, The Alchemist, and Harry Fraud. He stars in Fuck, That's Delicious with Action Bronson, The Alchemist, and Big Body Bes.

== Career ==
In 2007, Meyhem Lauren released a collaborative album with J-Love, titled Acknowledge Greatness. In 2010, he released "Got the Fever", a tribute song to graffiti culture. It was included on Complex's "25 Best Songs About Graffiti" list in 2012. The music video for the song has received a million views on YouTube.

Meyhem Lauren's debut solo album, titled Self Induced Illness, was released in 2011. In 2012, he released Respect the Fly Shit. It was included on Spin's "40 Best Hip-Hop Albums of 2012" list. In that year, he also released Mandatory Brunch Meetings. In 2014, he released a collaborative album with Buckwild, titled Silk Pyramids. It was included on The Village Voice's "10 Best New York City Rap Albums of 2014" list. In 2016, he released Piatto D'oro. In 2017, he released a collaborative album with DJ Muggs, titled Gems from the Equinox. In 2018, he released Glass, which was entirely produced by Harry Fraud. In 2022, he released a collaborative album with Daringer, titled Black Vladimir.

== Discography ==
=== Studio albums ===
- Acknowledge Greatness (2007) (with J-Love)
- Self Induced Illness (2011)
- Respect the Fly Shit (2012)
- Mandatory Brunch Meetings (2012)
- Silk Pyramids (2014) (with Buckwild)
- Piatto D'oro (2016)
- Gems from the Equinox (2017) (with DJ Muggs)
- Black Vladimir (2022) (with Daringer)
- Champagne for Breakfast (2023) (with DJ Muggs and Madlib)

=== EPs ===
- Raw Cashmere (2013)
- More Cashmere (2015)
- Frozen Angels (2018) (with DJ Muggs)
- Glass (2018) (with Harry Fraud)
- Extra Glass (2018)
- Nickel Plated Wordplay (2019)
- Members Only (2019) (with DJ Muggs)
- Glass 2.0 (2020) (with Harry Fraud)

=== Singles ===
- "Got the Fever" (2010)
- "Money in My Pocket" (2015)
- "Badmon Ting" (2016)
- "Still Playing Celo" (2019) (with The Alchemist)

== Filmography ==
=== Television series ===
- Fuck, That's Delicious (2016–2020)
