= Party Supplies =

American hip hop group

- Origin: Brooklyn, New York City, U.S.
- Genres: Hip hop; electro
- Years active: 2010–present
- Label: Fool's Gold Records
- Members: Justin Nealis; Sean Mahon

Party Supplies are an American record production and songwriting team, composed of Justin Nealis and Sean Mahon. On August 27, 2013, Justin Nealis and Sean Mahon released their first album as a group, titled Tough Love, on Fool's Gold Records. Rolling Stone rated Tough Love as the 13th best dance album of 2013 and described the album as being "dance music for introverts."
