= Termanology discography =

- Studio albums: 4
- EPs: 4
- Singles: 16
- Collaborative albums: 4

This is the discography of Termanology.

== Albums ==
=== Studio albums ===
List of albums, with selected chart positions and certifications
Title	Album details	Peak chart positions		Certifications
Title	Album details	US	US R&B	Certifications
Politics as Usual	Released: September 30, 2008; Label: ST. Records, Nature Sounds; Format: CD, LP, digital download	—	—	
G.O.Y.A. (Gunz Or Yay Available)	Released: October 8, 2013; Label: ST. Records, Showoff Records, Brick Records; Format: CD, digital download	—	—	
Shut Up and Rap	Released: December 9, 2014; Label: ST. Records, Showoff Records, Brick Records; Format: CD, digital download	—	—	
More Politics	Released: November 18, 2016; Label: ST. Records, Showoff Records, Brick Records; Format: CD, digital download	—	—	

=== Collaborative albums ===
List of albums, with selected chart positions
Title	Album details	Peak chart positions	
Title	Album details	US	US R&B
Reintroduced (Speakin' Thru Raw Epilogue Ed & Term) (with Ea$y Money - as S.T.R.E.E.T.)	Released: 2005; Label: Clockwork Music, Way Big Records, ST. Records; Format: CD	—	—
Out the Gate (with DC the Midi Alien)	Released: January 27, 2006; Label: ST. Records; Format: CD	—	—
1982 (with Statik Selektah - as 1982)	Released: October 26, 2010; Label: ST. Records, ShowOff Records, Brick Records; Format: CD, digital download	—	52
S.T.R.E.E.T. (Speakin' Thru Real Experience Every Time) (with Ea$y Money - as S.T.R.E.E.T.)	Released: November 22, 2011; Label: ST. Records; Format: CD	—	—
2012 (with Statik Selektah - as 1982)	Released: May 22, 2012; Label: Showoff Records, ST. Records, Brick Records; Format: CD, digital download	—	—
Fizzyology (with Lil' Fame)	Released: November 6, 2012; Label: ST. Records, Brick Records; Format: CD, LP, digital download	—	—
Anti-Hero (with Slaine)	Released: October 6, 2017; Label: ST. Records, Brick Records; Format: CD, digital download	—	—

=== Extended plays ===
List of extended Plays, with year released
Title	Album details
1982: The EP (with Statik Selektah) - as 1982)	Released: November 26, 2010; Label: Self-Released; Format: digital download
The Evening News EP (with Statik Selektah - as 1982)	Released: December 26, 2010; Label: Showoff Records; Format: digital download
Mas G.O.Y.A.	Released: May 13, 2014; Label: ST. Records, ShowOff Records; Format: CD, digital download
Term Brady	Released: October 9, 2015; Label: ST. Records, ShowOff Records; Format: CD, digital download

=== Mixtapes ===
List of mixtapes, with year released
Title	Album details
Hood Politics	Released: December 13, 2003; Label: Self-released; Format: Digital download
Hood Politics II	Released: February 16, 2005; Label: Self-released; Format: Digital download
Hood Politics III: Unsigned Hype	Released: 2005; Label: Self-released; Format: Digital download
Hood Politics IV: Show and Prove	Released November 10, 2006; Label: Self-released; Format: CD, Digital download
50 Bodies	Released: February 13, 2007; Label: Self-released; Format: Digital download
Hood Politics V	Released: August 17, 2007; Label: Self-released; Format: CD, Digital download
Da Cameo King	Released: April 16, 2008; Label: Self-released; Format: Digital download
If Heaven Was a Mile Away	Released: January 16, 2009; Label: Self-released; Format: CD, Digital download
Jackin' for Beats	Released: April 29, 2009; Label: Self-released; Format: CD, Digital download
Hood Politics VI: Time Machine	Released: September 18, 2009; Label: Self-released; Format: CD, Digital download
50 Bodies 3	Released: February 9, 2010; Label: Self-released; Format: Digital download
1982: The Diamond Collection (with Statik Selektah - as 1982)	Released: November 18, 2010; Label: Self-released; Format: Digital download
Cameo King II	Released: June 7, 2011; Label: Self-released; Format: CD, Digital download
50 Bodies Pt. 4	Released: April 13, 2012; Label: Self-released; Format: CD, Digital download
Hood Politics 7	Released: April 5, 2013; Label: Self-released; Format: CD, Digital download
50 Bodies Pt. 5	Released: April 20, 2015; Label: Self-released; Format: Digital download
Cameo King III	Released: March 11, 2016; Label: Self-released; Format: CD, Digital download

== Guest appearances ==
List of non-single guest appearances, with other performing artists, showing year released and album name
Title	Year	Other artist(s)	Album
"Bad Habits"	2007	Bent	Love Life Loyalty
"Stuntman"	2007	Lb, Bugout	Good Morning America
"Spell My Name Right (Intro)"	2007	Statik Selektah, DJ Premier	Spell My Name Right: The Album
"Stop, Look, Listen"	2007	Statik Selektah, Styles P, Q-Tip	Spell My Name Right: The Album
"Express Yourself '08"	2007	Statik Selektah, Talib Kweli, Consequence	Spell My Name Right: The Album
"Bam Bam"	2007	Statik Selektah, Red Cafe, Mims	Spell My Name Right: The Album
"G-Shit (Showoff Mix)"	2007	Statik Selektah, Uncle Murda, Sev-One, Jadakiss	Spell My Name Right: The Album
"Hardcore (So You Wanna Be)"	2007	Statik Selektah, Reks	Spell My Name Right: The Album
"It's Over Now"	2007	Statik Selektah, A.G.	Spell My Name Right: The Album
"Fresh"	2008	Cody The Catch	Death To Bubblegum
"The Future"	2008	Ali Vegas	Leader Of The New School
"Premonition"	2008	Reks, Consequence	Grey Hairs
"Big Dreamers (Lawtown Remix)"	2008	Reks, Krumbsnatcha	Grey Hairs
"Vengeance"	2008	East Coast Avengers, Apathy	Prison Planet
"To The Top (Stick 2 The Script)"	2008	Statik Selektah, Cassidy, Saigon	Stick 2 the Script
"Church"	2008	Statik Selektah	Stick 2 the Script
"Streets Of M.A."	2008	Statik Selektah, Masspike Miles, SuperSTah Snuk, Reks, Slaine, Ea$y Money, Frankie Wainwright, Smoke Bulga	Stick 2 the Script
"Stress"	2009	Dela, Queens Connex	Changes Of Atmosphere
"Money On The Ave (Remix)"	2009	Reks, Skyzoo	More Grey Hairs
"Rollin' Down The Freeway"	2009	Statik Selektah, Glasses Malone, Kali	Midnight Club: Los Angeles South Central - The South Central EP
"Crazy"	2009	M.O.P.	Foundation
"Here In Liberty City"	2009	Statik Selektah	Grand Theft Auto IV: The Lost & Damned EP (Special Edition)
"Get Your Degree"	2009	RK Parx, Mixre	Creature Of Habit
"The Best"	2009	Statik Selektah, Reks, JFK, Kali	The Pre-Game EP
"Come Around"	2010	Statik Selektah, Royce Da 5'9"	100 Proof: The Hangover
"Fake Love (Yes Men)"	2010	Statik Selektah, Reks, Kali, Good Brotha	100 Proof: The Hangover
"Eighty-Two"	2010	Statik Selektah	100 Proof: The Hangover
"Twisted Off The Henny"	2010	DJ G.I. Joe	I'm Going In!!
"Rock Starr"	2010	Kali	The Coast
"Higher"	2010	Kali	The Coast
"Premo (Freestyle)"	2010	Kali	The Coast
"Yes Man"	2010	Kali, Reks	The Coast
"Gangsterr"	2010	SP Double, Royce Da 5'9", Kid Vishis, King Heem	—N/a
"To Be Nice"	2010	Quest Tha Youngn, Reks	Quest For Greatness
"Fyuz"	2010	Sun God, Trife Diesel	Young Godz
"At Last"	2010	Eternia & MoSS, Reef The Lost Cauze	At Last
"Words I Feel"	2010	JR&PH7	The EP
"Paid In Full 2010 Freestyle"	2010	Mac Miller	—N/a
"Money & Power"	2010	Sonic, Reks	—N/a
"This Is Hip Hop"	2010	Sheek Louch, Joell Ortiz	Donnie Def Jam
"Flow By Number"	2010	Skyzoo & Illmind	Live From The Tape Deck
"Envy"	2010	Slaine	The Devil Never Dies
"Microphone Fiends"	2010	JR&PH7, Edo G	The Update
"DMS"	2011	Reks	Čo sa stalo?!
"Substance Abuse"	2011	DJ Deadeye, Gauge	Substance Abuse
"Wild Puerto Ricans"	2011	DJ Deadeye, Tony Touch, Ea$y Money	Substance Abuse
"We Run It"	2011	ST. da Squad	Substance Abuse
"Showtime"	2011	DJ Deadeye, SuperSTah Snuk	Substance Abuse
"Blood Brothaz Pt. 2"	2011	ST. da Squad	Substance Abuse
"Girl Interrupted"	2011	DJ Deadeye, Skyzoo	Substance Abuse
"Who I Do It For"	2011	Mike Beatz & Adonis, AZ	Mike Beatz & Adonis Presents: Boom Bap
"Use Your Mind"	2011	Ugly Tony, Don K.Sen, IDE	At Nightfall
"Brain Washed"	2011	Thoth	—N/a
"Wild Style"	2011	Freddie Gibbs & Statik Selektah, Fred the Godson	Lord Giveth, Lord Taketh Away
"Nous & Eux"	2011	Mad Shearz & Mic'D	Retour Aux Sources
"Certified"	2011	Kali	—N/a
"Assassins"	2011	Kali	Glasses On A Gloomy Day
"Meteor Hammer"	2011	Ghostface Killah, Action Bronson	Legendary Weapons
"No Reissue"	2011	Willie The Kid	—N/a
"That's How It Is"	2011	Slaine & Statik Selektah, Tully Banta-Cain	State Of Grace
"Be Right Here"	2011	Early Adopted, Ben Potrykus	Chilling Will Kill You
"Where You Come From?"	2011	Evidence, Rakaa, Lil' Fame	Cats & Dogs
"Population Control"	2011	Statik Selektah, Sean Price	Population Control
"Never A Dull Moment"	2011	Statik Selektah, Action Bronson, Bun B	Population Control
"4Gs"	2011	Statik Selektah, Ea$y Money, Scram Jones, Wais P	Population Control
"In My Clasa"	2011	Diaz	—N/a
"Ain't A Problem"	2011	J'You, Mic Stylz	Classic Reaction
"Such A Showoff"	2012	Reks, Kali, JFK	Straight, No Chaser
"Superfly"	2012	J Wheels & Edgar Allen Floe, Nakia Madry	Floetry In Motion
"Get Off The Ground"	2012	Snowgoons, Sean Price, Hannibal Stax, Justin Tyme, Ruste Juxx, Lil' Fame	Snowgoons Dynasty
"Ignorance Is Bliss"	2012	Reks	REBELutionary
"Something Special"	2012	Statik Selektah, Ea$y Money	—N/a
"How Many Bars"	2012	Lucky Dice	Arrogance
"Summertime"	2012	KaliRaps, C-Scharp, Moufy	Hats Off
"Bad Man"	2012	KaliRaps	Hats Off
"Summertime"	2012	Double G	Life Story
"Dear Government"	2012	Double G, Gery Mendes	Life Story
"Brothers On The Run"	2012	Statik Selektah & JFK, Reks	AGE: Open Season
"Firewater"	2012	DJ Kayslay, Jon Connor	Grown Man Hip Hop
"Anything You Heard About"	2012	Mega Trife	Full Circle
"Gotta Do"	2013	BLMP	Cruising Altitude
"Survival Of The Spitters"	2013	DJ Kayslay, J.R. Writer, Oun-P	Grown Man Hip Hop Part 2 (Sleepin' With The Enemy)
"Go In!"	2013	Shae Money, Sp Double	FRE3STYLE
"Immoral Ventilation"	2013	Realm Reality, Roc Marciano, AG Da Coroner	In The Grind We Trust
"Night Light"	2013	Jared Evan & Statik Selektah	Boom Bap & Blues
"Never Take Me Out"	2013	Demigodz	KILLmatic
"Gun Loaded"	2013	Rowlan	Rich By 8400
"Stoned"	2013	KaliRaps	Who I Am
"Sandwich Bag"	2013	Typ iLL	Now Or Never
"Headphones Lie"	2013	Effect & Dang, Esoteric, D-Tension, Illicit, Mic Stylz	You Don't Love Me And I Don't Care
"Reloaded"	2013	Statik Selektah, Pain In Da Ass, Action Bronson, Big Body Bes, Tony Touch	Extended Play
"Make Believe"	2013	Statik Selektah, Freddie Gibbs, Ea$y Money	Extended Play
"Game Break"	2013	Statik Selektah, Lecrae, Posdnuos	Extended Play
"B Side"	2013	That Kid Era	—N/a
"Aw Shux"	2013	Tony Touch	The Piece Maker 3: Return of the 50 MC's
"Lost In The Stars"	2013	M.O. Littles	No Matter What
"Never Forget"	2013	Ransom & Statik Selektah	The Proposal
"Men Of Respect (Made Men Bloody Version)"	2013	Mathematics, Raekwon, Method Man, Eyes Low, Cappadonna	The Answer
"Still Got It Made"	2013	Frank The Butcher & Paul Mighty, Realm Reality, Ea$y Money	BAU: All Is Fair
"The Warning"	2013	Eddie B & Harry Fraud, Sean Price	Paper, Piff & Polo
"Symphony Torture"	2013	Supreme Cerebral & Flip Da Soulfisher, Diagnostyx	BrassKnuckle Consortium
"Ghetto Survivor"	2014	DJ Kayslay, Trick-Trick, Troy Ave, Trae The Truth	The Rise Of A City
"Mind Power"	2014	Pawz One, Ras Kass	Face The Facts
"Could B Worse"	2014	Marcus D, SunN.Y.	Simply Complex
"Enter The Cipher"	2014	DJ Kayslay, Chris Rivers, William Young, Papoose	The Last Hip Hop Disciple
"Car Fight"	2014	Josh Xantus	—N/a
"Monsters"	2014	KaliRaps, Chris Webby	Mr. Misunderstood
"I, Visionary"	2014	Reks	Eyes Watching God
"Jon Doe Flow"	2014	Reks, Ea$y Money	Eyes Watching God
"Zip Zero"	2014	Slaine, Reks	The King of Everything Else
"Hard 2 Explain"	2014	Statik Selektah, Al-Doe, Chris Rivers	...Comes Around EP
"4 Brothers"	2014	Statik Selektah, LA The Darkman, Willie The Kid	...Comes Around EP
"Drunk & High"	2014	Statik Selektah, N.O.R.E., Reks	What Goes Around
"Like This (East Coast Remix)"	2014	Boaz, Oddisee, Vinny Radio	—N/a
"The Colosseum"	2014	A-Villa, Big K.R.I.T., Inspectah Deck	Carry On Tradition
"Work It Out"	2014	DJ Kayslay, Papoose, Saigon	The Original Man
"No Surrender"	2014	Typ iLL	—N/a
"All I Need"	2014	Mr. Phil, Havoc, Big Noyd, DJ Double S	NXN
"Calendars"	2015	Mike The Martyr, Muja Messiah	MARBURY
"DOLO"	2015	Stone Bench	DOLO EP
"Not A Fan"	2015	Big Shug, Reks	Triple OGzus
"Off Rip"	2015	Big Shug, Singapore Kane	Triple OGzus
"Dear America 2015"	2015	DJ Kayslay, Locksmith	The Industry Purge
"For The ST.reets"	2015	Ea$y Money	The M.O.N.E.Y.
"Ain't No Half Steppin"	2015	Chris Rivers	—N/a
"Wall Flowers"	2015	Statik Selektah, Your Old Droog, Lord Sear	Lucky 7
"B.A.R.S."	2015	N.B.S. & Snowgoons, Reks, Sicknature	Trapped In America
"The Crown"	2015	G.A.U.G.E.	Ricochet
"No Strays"	2015	G.A.U.G.E., SuperSTah Snuk	The Nocturnal Deity
"Play With Fire"	2015	G.A.U.G.E.	The Nocturnal Deity
"Spit Game Proper"	2015	DJ Kayslay, Loaded Lux, Cory Gunz	Shadow Of The Sun
"Can't Stop The Wave"	2016	Progress, Chris Rivers	U Ain't Hip
"Live Wires"	2016	Progress, Slaine, Ea$y Money, Reks, DJ Deadeye	U Ain't Hip
"Let's Go"	2016	Statik KXNG (Statik Selektah, KXNG CROOKED)	Statik KXNG
"Bar For Bar"	2016	DJ Kayslay, Mistah F.A.B., Locksmith	50 Shades Of Slay
"Sum Otha Sh!t"	2016	Nutso, Ea$y Money	—N/a
"Rappin With Term"	2016	SuperSTah Snuk	Man Of 1,000 Styles
"Night Night"	2016	SuperSTah Snuk, Ras Kass	Man Of 1,000 Styles
"The Show"	2016	Lyfe Crisis	Lyfe Collabs
"Termanology Freestyle"	2016	Top Shelf Premium	Off Top Vol. 1
"Imagine"	2016	Lyfe Crisis, Miss Sparks	—N/a
"Street Stories"	2016	DJ Kayslay, Hell Rell, Oun-P	The Rap Attack
"In Your Life"	2016	Fleetwood	—N/a
"Plane Gang"	2016	Reks, Akrobatik, Edo G	The Greatest X
"Good Women, Thot Bitches"	2016	Reks	The Greatest X
"Science of Healing"	2017	Everlast, Sick Jacken, Divine Styler	Warporn
"Rapper Shot"	2017	Superior, Don Streat, Lil Fame, DJ Grazzhoppa	The Journey
"Watch the Wave"	2017	Joe Young, Styles P	Invincible Armour
"Running"	2017	Kool G Rap, Saigon	Return of the Don
"Under Pressure"	2017	Chris Content	The Chris Content EP
"Gun Shot"	2017	Jarren Benton, Chris Rivers, Chucc Daily	The Mink Coat Killa
"Gladiator School"	2017	T.O.N.Y.	—N/a
"Run Wild"	2017	Ea$y Money, Reks, SuperSTah Snuk, Artisin, DJ Deadeye	Flyer Lansky
"No. 8"	2017	Statik Selektah, Westside Gunn, Conway	8
"Concrete"	2019	Bun B, Statik Selektah, Westside Gunn	TrillStatik
"Money Motivation"	2023	Paul Wall, Nim K.	—N/a
"No Apologies"	2023	Paul Wall, Bun B, Deandre Nico	—N/a
"Do It For The Ghetto"	2023	Paul Wall, Big K.R.I.T., Lakeith Rashad	—N/a
"Talk About It"	2023	Paul Wall	—N/a
"82-92"	2023	Statik Selektah, Mac Miller	—N/a
"The Game"	2023	V Knuckles	The Next Chapter
"Q-Tip"	2024	Khrysis, Wais P	Hocaine

== Production ==
=== 2012 ===
Ghostface Killah and Sheek Louch - Wu Block

- 08. "Drivin' Round" (feat. Masta Killa, GZA, & Erykah Badu) (co-produced by Moose & Odie Peken)

=== 2014 ===
Termanology - Shut Up and Rap

- 14. "My Time 2 Shine" (feat. Lil Fame) (co-produced by The Arcitype & Artisin)

=== 2015 ===
Sheek Louch - Silverback Gorilla 2

- 07. "Hold It Straight" (co-produced by Shortfyuz & Sir Bob Nash)
- 08. "Obamacare" (feat. Dyce Payne) (co-produced by L5)

=== 2016 ===
Progress - U Ain't Hip

- 09. "Live Wires" (feat. Slaine, Ea$y Money, Reks, Termanology, & DJ Deadeye)

Slaine - Slaine Is Dead

- 05. "Just The Way You Are" (feat. Termanology) (co-produced by DJ Deadeye & The Arcitype)

=== 2017 ===
Slaine and Termanology - Anti-Hero

- 09. "Snakes" (feat. Sick Jacken and Jared Evan) (co-produced by Artisin & The Arcitype)
