= Statik Selektah discography =

- Studio albums: 10
- EPs: 3
- Singles: 12
- Collaborative albums: 16

This is the discography of Statik Selektah.

== Albums ==
=== Studio albums ===
List of albums, with selected chart positions and certifications
| Title | Album details | Peak chart positions | |
| Title | Album details | US | US R&B |
|---|---|---|---|
| Spell My Name Right: The Album | Released: November 6, 2007; Label: Showoff Records, Brick Records; Format: CD, digital download | — | — |
| Stick 2 the Script | Released: October 21, 2008; Label: Showoff Records, Brick Records; Format: CD, digital download | — | — |
| 100 Proof: The Hangover | Released: February 2, 2010; Label: Showoff Records, Brick Records; Format: CD, digital download | — | — |
| Population Control | Released: October 25, 2011; Label: Showoff Records, Duck Down Music Inc.; Format: CD, digital download | — | 39 |
| Extended Play | Released: June 18, 2013; Label: Showoff Records, Duck Down Music Inc.; Format: CD, LP, digital download | 121 | 18 |
| What Goes Around | Released: August 19, 2014; Label: Showoff Records, Duck Down Music Inc.; Format: CD, LP, digital download | 77 | 14 |
| Lucky 7 | Released: July 7, 2015; Label: Showoff Records, Duck Down Music Inc.; Format: CD, LP, digital download | — | 47 |
| 8 | Released: December 8, 2017; Label: Showoff Records, Duck Down Music Inc.; Format: CD, LP, digital download | — | — |
| The Balancing Act | Released: November 27, 2020; Label: Mass Appeal Records; Format: CD, LP, digital download | — | — |
| Round Trip | Released: June 9, 2023; Label: Mass Appeal Records; Format: LP, cassette, digital download | — | — |
"—" denotes a recording that did not chart.|}

=== Collaborative albums ===
List of albums, with selected chart positions
| Title | Album details | Peak chart positions | |
| Title | Album details | US R&B | US Heat. |
|---|---|---|---|
| All In A Day's Work (with Saigon) | Released: March 17, 2009; Label: Amalgam Digital; Format: digital download| | — | — |
| 1982 (with Termanology - as 1982) | Released: October 26, 2010; Label: Showoff Records, ST. Records, Brick Records; Format: CD, digital download| | 52 | 26 |
| 1982: The EP (with Termanology - as 1982) | Released: November 26, 2010; Label: Self-Released; Format: digital download| | — | — |
| The Evening News EP (with Termanology - as 1982) | Released: December 26, 2010; Label: Showoff Records, ST. Records; Format: digital download| | — | — |
| Statik-Free EP (with Freeway) | Released: January 11, 2011; Label: Showoff Records, Team Early; Format: digital download| | — | — |
| Lyrical Workout (with Bumpy Knuckles) | Released: June 14, 2011; Label: Showoff Records, Krupt Mob Entertainment; Format: digital download| | — | — |
| Lord Giveth, Lord Taketh Away (with Freddie Gibbs) | Released: June 24, 2011; Label: Corporate Thugz, Showoff Records; Format: digital download| | — | — |
| State of Grace (with Slaine) | Released: August 2, 2011; Label: Self-Released; Format: digital download| | — | — |
| Well-Done (with Action Bronson) | Released: November 22, 2011; Label: Switchblade, DCide Records; Format: CD, LP, digital download| | — | — |
| 2012 (with Termanology - as 1982) | Released: May 22, 2012; Label: Showoff Records, ST. Records, Brick Records; Format: CD, digital download| | — | — |
| Stereotype (with Strong Arm Steady) | Released: August 14, 2012; Label: Stones Throw Records; Format: CD, LP, digital download| | — | — |
| Ambition (with Bumpy Knuckles) | Released: September 25, 2012; Label: Gracie Productions; Format: CD, LP, digital download| | — | — |
| Boom Bap & Blues (with Jared Evan) | Released: February 26, 2013; Label: Showoff Records, Jared Evan Inc.; Format: digital download| | — | — |
| The Proposal (with Ransom) | Released: September 30, 2013; Label: Showoff Records, Presidential Lifestyle; Format: CD, digital download| | — | — |
| Still Blue (with Jared Evan) | Released: October 27, 2014; Label: Showoff Records, Jared Evan Inc.; Format: digital download| | — | — |
| Statik KXNG (with KXNG Crooked) | Released: February 12, 2016; Label: Showoff Records, Penalty Entertainment; Format: digital download| | — | — |
| TrillStatik (with Bun B) | Released: April 20, 2019; Label: Showoff Records, II Trill Enterprises, EMPIRE; Format: digital download| | — | — |

=== Extended plays ===
List of extended plays, with year released
| Title | Album details |
|---|---|
| Grand Theft Auto IV: The Lost & Damned EP (Special Edition) | Released: October 26, 2009; Label: Showoff Records; Format: Digital download |
| The Pre-Game EP | Released: December 15, 2009; Label: Showoff Records; Format: Digital download |
| The Left-Overs (Of What’s To Come…) EP | Released: 2010; Label: Self-Released; Format: Digital download |

== Singles ==
List of singles as lead artist, showing year released and album name
| Title | Year | Album |
|---|---|---|
| "Hardcore (So You Wanna Be)" (featuring Reks & Termanology) | 2007 | Spell My Name Right: The Album |
| "No Holding Back" (featuring AZ & Cormega) | 2007 | Spell My Name Right: The Album |
| "Stop, Look, Listen" (featuring Styles P, Termanology, & Q-Tip) | 2008 | Spell My Name Right: The Album |
| "Critically Acclaimed" (featuring Lil' Fame, Saigon, & Sean Price) | 2009 | 100 Proof: The Hangover |
| "82 92" (featuring Mac Miller) | 2010 | 1982: The EP |
| "Play The Game" (featuring Big K.R.I.T. & Freddie Gibbs) | 2011 | Population Control |
| "Live & Let Live" (featuring Lecrae) | 2011 | Population Control |
| "Groupie Love" (featuring Mac Miller & Josh Xantus) | 2011 | Population Control |
| "Cocoa Butter" (featuring Nina Sky) | 2011 | Well-Done |
| "Bird's Eye View" (featuring Raekwon, Joey Bada$$ & Black Thought) | 2013 | Extended Play |
| "21 & Over" (featuring Sean Price & Mac Miller) | 2013 | Extended Play |
| "Game Break" (featuring Lecrae, Termanology & Posdnuos) | 2013 | Extended Play |
| "The Imperial" (featuring Action Bronson, Royce da 5'9" & Black Thought) | 2014 | What Goes Around |
| "Beautiful Life" (featuring Action Bronson & Joey Bada$$) | 2015 | Lucky 7 |
| "Top Tier" (featuring Sean Price, Bun B & Styles P) | 2015 | Lucky 7 |
| "All You Need" (featuring Action Bronson, Ab-Soul & Elle Varner) | 2015 | Lucky 7 |
| "Crystal Clear" (featuring Royce Da 5'9") | 2015 | Lucky 7 |
| "Man Of The Hour" (featuring 2 Chainz & Wiz Khalifa) | 2017 | 8 |
| "But You Don't Hear Me Tho" (featuring The Lox & Mtume) | 2017 | 8 |

== Guest appearances ==
List of guest appearances, with other performing artists, showing year released and album name
| Title | Year | Other artist(s) | Album |
|---|---|---|---|
| "Stick 2 the script" | 2009 | Termanology, Cassidy, Saigon | Lyrical Flow |
| "Girl Interrupted" | 2009 | Termanology, Skyzoo | Lyrical Flow |
| "Stop look & listen" | 2009 | Termanology | Lyrical Flow |
| "HUSTLER THEME" | 2011 | Benefit | THE TIME IS NOW |
| "The Time Is Now" | 2011 | A3C, Slaine | A3c, Vol. 1 |
| "BK Don't Stop" | 2011 | Steven King | Distribution Habits - E.P. |
| "My Universe" | 2012 | La Coka Nostra, Vinnie Paz | Masters Of The Dark Arts |
| "On the Corner" | 2013 | Big Twins, Freddie Gibbs, Planet Asia, The Alchemist | Thrive |
| "Close Encounter" | 2013 | D. Lector | Bars Attack |
| "Do It Twice" | 2013 | D. Lector | Bars Attack |
| "Hurt You" | 2013 | D. Lector | Bars Attack |
| "Heads in My Bookbag" | 2013 | D. Lector, Jarren Benton | Bars Attack |
| "Stay Fly" | 2013 | D. Lector, Jitta On the Track | Bars Attack |
| "Psycho" | 2013 | D. Lector | Bars Attack |
| "ABC's" | 2013 | D. Lector | Bars Attack |
| "Look Out Now" | 2013 | D. Lector, Soul Khan | Bars Attack |
| "Bars Attack" | 2013 | D. Lector | Bars Attack |
| "Fully Medicated" | 2013 | D. Lector, M.A.R | Bars Attack |
| "Dtmm Cypher" | 2013 | D. Lector, Meta4s, Rook, Kid Karma, Los Fidel | Bars Attack |
| "Tic Tac Toe" | 2013 | D. Lector, Tantrum | Bars Attack |
| Dear World" | 2013 | D. Lector | Bars Attack |
| "I'm the City" | 2013 | Guilty Simpson, Small Professor, Boldy James | Highway Robbery |
| "My Illusion" | 2013 | Dead Heat, Slaine | Dbkpc |
| "Nonsense on Drugs" | 2014 | Mega Trife, Greg MC, Nonsense | 2095 |
| "4 Brothers" | 2014 | La The Darkman, Termanology, Willie The Kid | La Paraphernalia |
| "Get Down" | 2014 | Cane | Citizen Cane |
| "Love & War" | 2014 | Freeway, Ea$y Money | Month of Madness, Vol. 11 |
| "Deeper" | 2015 | Brady Watt, J Essential, Pleasure Pete, Ski Beatz | Lifetronics |
| "Any You Don't Stop Revisit" | 2015 | D-Stroy, Slaine | Democrazy |
| "Flip da Hat" | 2015 | Ape the Grim | The Idealist |
| "Swipe da Funk" | 2015 | Ape the Grim, Mr. Lif, Nabo Rawk | The Idealist |
| "Wanna Go?!?!" | 2015 | Ape the Grim | The Idealist |
| "Preposition" | 2015 | Mazzi, S.O.U.L. Purpose | The Inspection |
| "Take Time" | 2016 | Cane, Termanology | The Dark Hours |
| "State of Mind" | 2016 | Millyz | The Short Bus |
| "The Future" | 2016 | Ali Vegas, Termanology | Paid Time Off |
| "Exhausted" | 2016 | Jabee | Black Future |
| "White Silk Freestyle" | 2016 | Verndolla$ | 1998 |
| "Super Conscious" | 2016 | ELLI$ | Ocean Grown |
| "Jump Shots" | 2016 | Reks | The Greatest X |
| "Stay True" | 2016 | La Coka Nostra | To Thine Own Self Be True |
| "Luces Fantasma" | 2017 | La Banda Baston, MAKENNA | Luces Fantasma |
| "What Do They Know" | 2017 | Elliterate, Kay-R, Termanology | Charlie Russell |
| "Motion" | 2017 | Young RJ, Joyner Lucas, Earlly Mac | Blaq Royalty |
| "Motion (Instrumental)" | 2017 | Young RJ, Joyner Lucas, Earlly Mac | Blaq Royalty (Instrumental) |
| "Turn It Up" | 2017 | Co-Defendants | Co Defendants |
| "Tread Lightly" | 2018 | MC Bravado, SC Static | Like Water For Hangovers |
| "Turn It Up (Remix)" | 2018 | PR Dean, Co-Defendants, Rigz, Benefit, IamProfit | Street Genius |
| "Freestyle, Pt. 1" | 2018 | Conway the Machine | 50 Round Drum |
| "Freestyle, Pt. 2" | 2018 | Conway the Machine | 50 Round Drum |
| "My DJ (Instrumental)" | 2019 | DJ Jean Maron, Tony Touch, Djaz, Spaig, Roy de Marco, Kwistax, Spinna, Low Cut, Deezdaze, DJ Daddy K, Smoke, Skeezo, Nikkel K, Swamp, Modesty, Qash, Fonkmaz | True School (Instrumentals) |
| "My DJ" | 2019 | DJ Jean Maron, Tony Touch, Djaz, Spaig, Roy de Marco, Kwistax, Spinna, Low Cut, Deezdaze, DJ Daddy K, Smoke, Skeezo, Nikkel K, Swamp, Modesty, Qash, Fonkmaz | True School (5th Anniversary) |
| "We Movin (Instrumental)" | 2019 | AZ | Greatest Beats (Instrumental) |
| "Trick the Trap" | 2019 | Slaine, The Arcitype, Rasheed Chappell | One Day |
| "Intro (Set the Stage)" | 2020 | Nef, Termanology | Tabula Rasa |
| "BARRELL" | 2020 | CJ Fly, Haile Supreme | RUDEBWOY |
| "SHOW YOU" | 2020 | CJ Fly | RUDEBWOY |
| "Somethin For You" | 2020 | Mr. Cheeks, Chatham the Sun | Lights, Camera, Action 2 |
| "Splatter Paint" | 2020 | Jared Evan, Skyzoo, Termanology | The Art Form of Whatever II |
| "Classy Don's | 2020 | Rockwelz, John Jigg$ | Night Flex in L.E.S |
| "LOCATION" | 2020 | Slayter | WORLD GOT ME FUCKED UP, Vol. 1 |
| "Show Off Radio (2015)" | 2020 | Sean Strange | Radio Sessions Vol.1 |
| "I Keep Calling" | 2021 | 80 Empire, Masta Ace, Frank Castle | Legacy |
| "Money Can Buy" | 2021 | Ea$y Money, Fabeyon | Beyond Ea$y |
| "Zero Kill" | 2021 | TEK | Pricele$$ |
| "The Illest" | 2021 | TEK | Pricele$$ |
| "Lazy Sunday (Statik Selektah Remix)" | 2021 | Kooley High, Melanie Charles | Lazy Sunday |
| "Lazy Sunday (Statik Selektah Remix Instrumental)" | 2021 | Kooley High | Lazy Sunday |
| "Chapo" | 2021 | Dave East, Millyz | Pablo & Blanco |
| "Brainless" | 2021 | Lou From Paradise | Not Dead Yet! |
| "Not Dead Yet" | 2021 | Lou From Paradise | Not Dead Yet! |
| "Antifreeze" | 2021 | Lou From Paradise | Not Dead Yet! |
| "Cold Shoulder" | 2021 | Lou From Paradise | Not Dead Yet! |
| "Outside Wit Psychoz" | 2021 | Lou From Paradise | Not Dead Yet! |
| "Stray Dog Freestyle" | 2021 | Lou From Paradise | Not Dead Yet! |
| "The Oils" | 2021 | OT the Real | You Are Who You Eat With |
| "Here We Go Again" | 2021 | Master Peace, Vokab, DJ Pompey | The Bucket List EP |
| "Girl That Wants To Ride" | 2022 | Brash | Ken & Judi's Kid |
| "Translator" | 2022 | Vandal | Pick Ya Poison, Vol. 1 |
| "AFTERPARTY" | 2022 | KitcheThePoet, Tyree Kinney | RETRO 95 |
| "Move Away" | 2022 | Lyfe Crisis | Lost Cauze |
| "Here We Go" | 2022 | Lyfe Crisis, Mr. Ent | Lost Cauze |
| "El Puerto (Butter)" | 2022 | Trilly Trills | Divine Intervention: Just Win Baby! |
| "El Puerto (Butter) (Radio Edit)" | 2022 | Trilly Trills | Divine Intervention: Just Win Baby! (Clean Version) [Radio Edit] |
| "T.K.N.Y. (DJ Mixed Version)" | 2022 | DJ Hazime, Kojoe, B.D., ELIONE, ¥ellow Bucks | Strictly (Japanese Hip Hop Mix mixed by DJ HAZIME) |
| "Stank (2012)" | 2022 | JFK, Wade Burner | #AGE |
| "Nasal Drip" | 2023 | Casket D. | CALCULATED |
| "Kareless Whisper" | 2023 | Casket D., COLTx | CALCULATED |
| "Pit Boss" | 2023 | Casket D. | CALCULATED |
| "The Math" | 2023 | Casket D. | CALCULATED |
| "Inspiration (Statik Selektah Remix)" | 2023 | Chris Mazuera | Let's Take a Trip (Remixes) |
| "Insane in the Brain (Remix)" | 2023 | Cypress Hill | Black Sunday (Deluxe) |
| "The Back Burner" | 2023 | Ben Buck | Back Burner '97 |
| "Spooky Spawns" | 2023 | Rim, GREA8GAWD | Rimbrandt 2 Metal Canvas |
| "The Return" | 2023 | Living Legends, Del the Funky Homosapien | The Return |
| "Don't Stop" | 2023 | Needagroove, Termanology | Rare Pearl |
| "MetaVerse" | 2024 | Reks, SHORT BUSS13 | M.A.G.A. (Make Art Great Again) |
| "Pain Management (Part I)" | 2024 | ACT-1 | Shit That Keeps Me Up At Night |
| "State of Mine (Master)" | 2024 | WiseWords | The 90s |
| "Cruisin' Round" | 2024 | WiseWords, Termanology | The 90s |
| "Jesse Owens(Champions)" | 2024 | WiseWords, Skyzoo | The 90s |
| "Choice Is Yours (Master)" | 2024 | WiseWords, Grafh | The 90s |
| "Gunz & Butta" | 2024 | WiseWords, Billy Danze | The 90s |
| "Sons of Solomon" | 2024 | WiseWords | The 90s |
| "Message Sent" | 2024 | WiseWords, Planet Asia | The 90s |
| "OG" | 2024 | Leekjaymusic, Planet Asia | Rushin Hours Selektah Edition |
| "Immaculate" | 2024 | Leekjaymusic | Rushin Hours Selektah Edition |
| "Stop and go" | 2024 | Leekjaymusic, Billy Danze | Rushin Hours Selektah Edition |
| "I Swear (radio)" | 2024 | Leekjaymusic, Skyzoo | Rushin Hours Selektah Edition |
| "Gas" | 2024 | Leekjaymusic, Grafh | Rushin Hours Selektah Edition |
| "Off The Radar" | 2024 | Leekjaymusic | Rushin Hours Selektah Edition |
| "Angels" | 2024 | Che Noir, The Soulyghost | The Lotus Child |
| "Detente 2.0" | 2024 | D.O.M of Dnd, Termanology, Melks | The Diagniatrist |
| "Brock Purdy" | 2024 | Emmet Nino Hayes | STATIK SZN |
| "Pro Smoke" | 2024 | Emmet Nino Hayes, Planet Asia, ØMEGA | STATIK SZN |
| "Grab n Go" | 2024 | Emmet Nino Hayes, Termanology | STATIK SZN |
| "Steve Roland" | 2024 | Emmet Nino Hayes, Skyzoo | STATIK SZN |
| "Turn It Up" | 2024 | Emmet Nino Hayes, Grafh, Martin Ocean | STATIK SZN |
| "You Got Served" | 2024 | Emmet Nino Hayes, Billy Danze | STATIK SZN |
| "Not a Shade 45 (Freestyle)" | 2024 | Emmet Nino Hayes | STATIK SZN |
| "International" | 2024 | Stacctonio, Grafh | Long Live Lil Creep |
| "We Does This" | 2024 | VT Union, NasteeLuvzYou | Tribute Volume 1 |
| "Pygmalion Effect" | 2025 | Dr Lekta, Soulogik | How My Mind Tricks |
| "Bystander Effect" | 2025 | Dr Lekta, Soulogik | How My Mind Tricks |
| "Paradox Effect" | 2025 | Dr Lekta, Soulogik, Redroc | How My Mind Tricks |
| "Indiana Product" | 2025 | Leekjaymusic | Rushin Hours 2 WuSelekts |
| "Halloween Nightmares" | 2025 | Leekjaymusic | Rushin Hours 2 WuSelekts |
| "Disadvantage" | 2025 | Leekjaymusic | Rushin Hours 2 WuSelekts |
| "Uncle Cush" | 2025 | Leekjaymusic | Rushin Hours 2 WuSelekts |
| "Write Away" | 2025 | Vokab | The Master Class EP (A Storied Adventure) |
| "Still Got It" | 2025 | Vokab | The Master Class EP (A Storied Adventure) |
| "Animal Instinct" | 2025 | Vokab, MP, Iisel, Samlam the MC | The Master Class EP (A Storied Adventure) |
| "SENT UP" | 2025 | Rah B, Planet Asia, TRIP DA RIPPA | WHAT THE GAMES BEEN MISSING |
| "Unforgiven" | 2025 | Ea$y Money, Phinelia | Drug Money |
| "Hot Things(Burnin')" | 2025 | Ghetto-T., Planet Asia | Follow The White Rabbit |
| "Testimony" | 2025 | Ghetto-T., Termanology | Follow The White Rabbit |
| "Hello New World" | 2025 | Larry Coleman 2020 | HUNGER GAM3S 3 |
| "Sweat Peach Tea" | 2025 | Larry Coleman 2020 | HUNGER GAM3S 4 |
| "Hitters" | 2025 | Dr Lekta, Br00tal Productions, Billy Danze, Redroc, Mademelo, Beewere | Fear & Loathing In The Shaw |
| "Baltimore Love Thing" | 2025 | WiseWords | LAYERS |
| "All or Nothing" | 2025 | Emmet Nino Hayes | Midnight |
| "You Got The Message" | 2025 | Dr Lekta, Prefects, Planet Asia | Do You Know What I Mean |
| "甜" | 2025 | Chef | 甜酸苦辣 |
| "酸" | 2025 | Chef | 甜酸苦辣 |
| "The Back Burner (Remix)" | 2025 | Ben Buck, Nick Cruz | Back Burner '97 (Deluxe Edition) [Remix] |
| "treasure." | 2025 | Louu | theredtape. |
| "Cypher" | 2025 | Loco Mic, Ghetto-T., Grafh | Cross-Over 3 |
| "State Of Mine" | 2026 | WiseWords | RUBEDO |
