= Saigon discography =

The discography of American rapper Saigon.

== Albums ==
=== Studio albums ===
List of albums, with selected chart positions
Title	Album details	Peak chart positions		
Title	Album details	US	US R&B	US Rap
The Greatest Story Never Told	Released: February 15, 2011; Label: Suburban Noize Records; Format: CD, Digital download	61	15	7
The Greatest Story Never Told Chapter 2: Bread and Circuses	Released: November 6, 2012; Label: Suburban Noize Records; Format: CD, Digital download	189	25	19
G.S.N.T. 3: The Troubled Times of Brian Carenard	Released: September 30, 2014; Label: Squid Ink Squad Records; Format: CD, Digital download	—	—	—
Pain, Peace & Prosperity	Released: March 26, 2021; Label: Point Blank Media Group; Format: CD, Digital download	—	—	—
"—" denotes a title that did not chart, or was not released in that territory.

=== Collaborative albums ===
List of collaborative albums, with year released
Title	Album details
The Jordan Era (with Fredro)	Released: May 3, 2024; Label: Payday Records; Format: CD, LP, Digital download
Paint the World Black (with Buckwild)	Released: September 5, 2025; Label: It Goes Up Entertainment, Virgin; Format: CD, Digital download

=== Extended plays ===
List of extended plays, with year released
Title	Album details
777: The Resurrection (with Streetrunner)	Released: August 28, 2020; Label: It Goes Up Entertainment, Point Blank; Format: CD, Digital download

=== Mixtapes ===
List of mixtapes, with year released
Title	Album details
Da Yard Father 1	Released: 2003; Label: Self-released; Format: Digital download
Da Yard Father 2	Released: 2003; Label: Self-released; Format: Digital download
Warning Shots	Released: 2004; Label: Self-released; Format: Digital download
Abandoned Nation	Released: 2005; Label: Self-released; Format: Digital download
Abandoned Tracks Vol. 1	Released: 2005; Label: Self-released; Format: Digital download
Abandoned Tracks Vol. 2	Released: 2005; Label: Self-released; Format: Digital download
Welcome to Saigon	Released: 2006; Label: Self-released; Format: Digital download
The Return of the Yardfather	Released: 2006; Label: Self-released; Format: Digital download
Belly of the Beast	Released: 2006; Label: Self-released; Format: Digital download
The Moral of the Story	Released: November 23, 2007; Label: Amalgam Digital; Format: Digital download
All in a Day's Work (with Statik Selektah)	Released: March 17, 2009; Label: Amalgam Digital; Format: Digital download
Warning Shots 2	Released: 2009; Label: Self-released; Format: Digital download
Warning Shots 3: One Foot in the Grave	Released: January 24, 2012; Label: Self-released; Format: Digital download

== Singles ==
=== As lead artist ===
List of singles, with selected chart positions and certifications, showing year released and album name
Title	Year	Peak chart positions			Album
Title	Year	US	US R&B	US Rap	Album
"Say Yes"	2001	—	—	—	—N/a
"Do You Know"	2002	—	—	—	—N/a
"Favorite Things"	2004	—	—	—	—N/a
"Pain In My Life" (featuring Trey Songz)	2006	—	91	—	—N/a
"C'mon Baby" (featuring Swizz Beatz)	2007	—	—	—	The Greatest Story Never Told
"Gotta Believe It" (featuring Just Blaze)	2009	—	—	—	Warning Shots 2
"Bring Me Down"	2010	—	—	—	The Greatest Story Never Told
"The Greatest Story Never Told"	2011	—	—	—	The Greatest Story Never Told
"Clap" (featuring Faith Evans)	2011	—	—	—	The Greatest Story Never Told
"Not Like Them" (featuring Styles P)	2012	—	—	—	The Greatest Story Never Told Chapter 2: Bread and Circuses
"Best Thing That I Found" (featuring Lecrae and Corbett)	2012	—	—	—	The Greatest Story Never Told Chapter 2: Bread and Circuses
"Best Mistake" (featuring G. Martin)	2013	—	—	—	GSNT 3: The Troubled Times of Brian Carenard
"Sinner's Prayer" (featuring Papoose & Omar Epps)	2014	—	—	—	GSNT 3: The Troubled Times of Brian Carenard
"Nunya"	2014	—	—	—	GSNT 3: The Troubled Times of Brian Carenard
"—" denotes a recording that did not chart or was not released in that territory.

=== As featured artist ===
List of singles as featured performer, with selected chart positions, showing year released and album name
Title	Year	Peak chart positions			Album
Title	Year	US	US R&B	US Rap	Album
"Ooh Wee" (Mark Ronson featuring Ghostface Killah, Nate Dogg, Trife Diesel and Saigon)	2003	—	—	—	Here Comes the Fuzz
"—" denotes a recording that did not chart or was not released in that territory.

== Guest appearances ==
List of non-single guest appearances, with other performing artists, showing year released and album name
Title	Year	Other artist(s)	Album
"Wanna Know"	2007	Obie Trice	—N/a
"Weekend Jumpoff"	2007	Kevin Michael	Entourage: Music From and Inspired by the Hit HBO Original Series
"Criminal"	2008	The Roots, Truck North	Rising Down
"Hip Hop"	2008	Joell Ortiz, Jadakiss	—N/a
"To the Top (Stick 2 the Script)"	2008	Statik Selektah, Termanology, Cassidy	Stick 2 the Script
"Critically Acclaimed"	2010	Statik Selektah, Lil' Fame, Sean Price	100 Proof: The Hangover
"God Forgive Me"	2010	DJ Kay Slay, Joell Ortiz, Jae Millz	More Than Just a DJ
"Give It To Me"	2010	Rhymefest, ADaD	El Che
"Lifetime Membership"	2010	DJ Premier, Teflon, Papoose	DJ Premier Presents Get Used To Us
"Where I'm From"	2011	Irv Da Phenom	Dream Big, Hustle Hard
"Say It (Remix)"	2011	Termanology, Bun B, Joell Ortiz, Freeway	"Da Cameo King 2"
"You Gon Learn (Early Service)"	2012	Chamillionaire	Ammunition (EP)
"M.A.R.S."	2012	Large Professor, Cormega, Action Bronson, Roc Marciano	Professor @ Large
"Hear Me"	2012	Journalist 103, Fashawn	Reporting Live
"Its OK"	2013	K-Slick	Twenty-One
"No Sympathy"	2014	DJ Kay Slay, N.O.R.E., Torch	The Rise of a City
"Freedom of Speech"	2014	DJ Kay Slay, Raekwon, Papoose	The Last Hip Hop Disciple
"Garvey"	2014	Reks, N.O.R.E.	Eyes Watching God
"Change Gonna Come"	2015	Shuko, Vinnie Paz, R.A. the Rugged Man, Carolyn D'Elia	For the Love of It
"We're Both Wrong"	2016	Termanology	More Politics
