= More Politics =

Studio album by Termanology
- Released: November 18, 2016
- Recorded: 2013–16
- Genre: Hip-hop
- Length: 46:37
- Label: ST. Records; Showoff Records; Brick Records
- Producer: Statik Selektah (also exec.); Termanology (exec.); Buckwild; Dame Grease; Hi-Tek; J.U.S.T.I.C.E. League; Just Blaze; Nottz; Q-Tip

Termanology chronology
Cameo King III (2016)	More Politics (2016)	Anti-Hero (2017)

Singles from More Politics
- 1. "We're Both Wrong" Released: July 7, 2016; 2. "I Dream B.I.G." Released: October 7, 2016; 3. "Top Shotta" Released: November 10, 2016; 4. "Let's Go (Part 2)" Released: November 15, 2016

More Politics is the fourth studio album by American rapper Termanology. It was released on November 18, 2016, through his own record label, ST. Records, Statik Selektah's Showoff Records, and Boston based label Brick Records. It serves as a sequel to Politics as Usual (2008).

External videos
- Termanology "I Dream B.I.G." ft. Styles P & Sheek Louch (November 1, 2016)
- Termanology "It's Quiet" Prod By Dame Grease (November 18, 2016)
- Termanology "Krazy Thangs" ft Cyrus DeShield (Prod by Nottz) (December 8, 2016)
- Termanology "Looking Back" Official Video (March 1, 2017)
- Termanology "We're Both Wrong" ft Saigon (Prod by Q-Tip) (April 12, 2017)

== Background ==
The album includes guest appearances from Bodega Bamz, Bun B, Chris Rivers, Conway, Crushboys, Cyrus DeShield, Ea$y Money, Joey Bada$$, Kendra Foster, KXNG CROOKED, Masspike Miles, Saigon, Sean Taylor, Sheek Louch, Styles P, Westside Gunn and Your Old Droog. The album features production from D.I.T.C.'s Buckwild, Dame Grease, Hi-Tek, J.U.S.T.I.C.E. League, Just Blaze, Nottz, Q-Tip and Statik Selektah.

== Singles ==
On July 7, 2016, the first single from the album, "We're Both Wrong" featuring Saigon was released. On October 7, 2016, he released the second single "I Dream B.I.G." featuring Sheek Louch & Styles P. The official music video for the single was released on November 1, 2016.

== Track listing ==
No.	Title	Writer(s)	Producer	Length
1.	"Just Politics"	Daniel Carrillo; Justin Smith	Just Blaze	2:50
2.	"I Dream B.I.G." (featuring Sheek Louch and Styles P)	Carrillo; Sean Jacobs; David Styles; Anthony Best; Patrick Baril	Buckwild	3:33
3.	"Looking Back" (featuring Crushboys)	Carrillo; Kenneth Bartolomei; Kevin Crowe; Andres Gill; Zachary Maxey; Erik Ortiz; Rafael Otero; Rayshaun Thompson	J.U.S.T.I.C.E. League	3:31
4.	"Where's the Love" (featuring Bun B, Bodega Bamz and Masspike Miles)	Carrillo; Bernard Freeman; Nathaniel DeLa Rosa; Richard Wheeler; Tony Cottrell	Hi-Tek	3:54
5.	"We're Both Wrong" (featuring Saigon)	Carrillo; Brian Carenard; Kamaal Fareed	Q-Tip	2:34
6.	"Let's Go (Part 2)" (featuring KXNG Crooked)	Carrillo; Dominick Wickliffe; Baril; Ortiz	Statik Selektah	2:55
7.	"Top Shotta" (featuring Joey Bada$$)	Carrillo; Jo-Vaughn Scott; Baril	Statik Selektah	2:34
8.	"Krazy Thangs" (featuring Cyrus DeShield)	Carrillo; Cyrus DeShield; Dominick Lamb	Nottz	4:01
9.	"First Love" (featuring Sean Taylor)	Carrillo; Baril; Jonathan Buck; Brady Watt	Statik Selektah	3:30
10.	"The Last Time"	Carrillo; Baril	Statik Selektah	3:06
11.	"Moving Forward" (featuring Kendra Foster)	Carrillo; Kendra Foster; Baril	Statik Selektah	3:35
12.	"The Curve" (featuring Westside Gunn, Conway and Your Old Droog)	Carrillo; Alvin Worthy; Demond Price; Kunte Dikenta; Baril; Watt	Statik Selektah	3:10
13.	"Bar Show" (featuring Ea$y Money and Chris Rivers)	Carrillo; Ed Rivera; Christopher Rios, Jr.; Baril; Caswell Weinbren	Statik Selektah	4:00
14.	"It's Quiet"	Carrillo; Damon Blackman	Dame Grease	3:24
Total length:				46:37
