= More Grey Hairs =

Compilation album by Reks
- Released: March 10, 2009
- Genre: Hip hop
- Label: ShowOff Records
- Producer: DJ Premier, Statik Selektah, The Soul Searchers

Reks chronology
Grey Hairs (2008)	More Grey Hairs (2009)	Rhythmatic Eternal King Supreme (2011)

Professional ratings
Review scores
Source	Rating
HipHopDX	3.5/5
RapReviews.com	7.5/10

More Grey Hairs is a compilation album by the American rapper Reks, released on March 10, 2009, by ShowOff Records. The album contains previously unreleased songs that were cut from Reks' previous album, Grey Hairs, and other unreleased songs recorded at that time.

It was listed by The Phoenix as one of the "Top 20 Hip-Hop Albums of 2009".

== Track listing ==
No.	Title	Producer	Length
1.	"Bitter"	The Soul Searchers	2:40
2.	"Play My Music"	Statik Selektah	3:28
3.	"Cloud 9"	DJ Premier	2:56
4.	"Stereotypes"	1914 & Statik Selektah	3:32
5.	"Killaz on Wax"	Statik Selektah	3:16
6.	"System"	DJ GI Joe	3:35
7.	"Year of the Showoff"	Statik Selektah	2:55
8.	"Money on the Ave (Remix)" (featuring Termanology and Skyzoo)	Soul Theory	4:20
9.	"Dear Winter"	Timeless	3:06
10.	"Goodnight & Goodluck"	Demo	3:22
11.	"Why Do We Say Goodbye"	Statik Selektah	3:39
12.	"I Ain't Sh*t"	J. Creed	4:16
13.	"Light of Mine"	DJ Sprino	3:32
14.	"Til Ya Hair Turns Grey"	DJ Sprino	3:56
