= Shut Up and Rap =

Studio album by Termanology
- Released: December 9, 2014
- Recorded: 2014
- Genre: Hip-hop
- Length: 54:38
- Label: ST. Records, Showoff Records, Brick Records
- Producer: Billy Loman; The Arcitype; Termanology; Artisin; The Alchemist; Statik Selektah; The Mighty Moe

Termanology chronology
Mas G.O.Y.A. (2014)	Shut Up and Rap (2014)	50 Bodies 5 (2015)

Singles from Shut Up and Rap
- 1. "The War Begins" Released: October 7, 2014; 2. "El Wave" Released: November 5, 2014; 3. "I Fucks with You" Released: December 11, 2014; 4. "Get Away" Released: January 13, 2015

Shut Up and Rap is the third studio album by American rapper Termanology, released on December 9, 2014, through his own record label, ST. Records, Statik Selektah's Showoff Records, and Boston based label Brick Records.

External videos
- Termanology "The War Begins" feat Chris Rivers & H Blanco (Prod By Billy Loman) (December 1, 2014)
- TERMANOLOGY "PHOTOSHOOT FRESH" FEAT DUTCH REBELLE & WAIS P (December 8, 2014)
- Termanology "I Fucks With You" feat Lumidee & Cyrus DeShield (December 11, 2014)
- Termanology "Get Away" feat Skyzoo, Torae & Reks (January 10, 2015)
- Termanology "Depths of hell" feat Slaine & Artisin (March 23, 2015)

== Background ==
The album includes guest appearances from Artisin, Astro, Chasen Hampton, Chilla Jones, Chris Rivers, Cortez, Doo Wop, Dutch ReBelle, Ea$y Money, H Blanco, Inspectah Deck, Lil Fame, Lumidee, Michael Christmas, Reks, Slaine, Skyzoo, SuperSTah Snuk, Torae, Wais P and Willie The Kid. The album is mostly produced by Billy Loman.

== Singles ==
On October 7, 2014, the first single from the album, "The War Begins" featuring Inspectah Deck, Chris Rivers & H Blanco, was released. The official music video for the single was released on December 1, 2014. On November 5, 2014, he released the second single "El Wave". On December 11, 2014, he released the third single "I Fucks with You " featuring Lumidee & Cyrus DeShield. The official music video for the single was released the same day. On January 13, 2015, he released the fourth single "Get Away" featuring Skyzoo, Torae & Reks. The official music video for the single was released the same day.

== Track listing ==
No.	Title	Producer	Length
1.	"Shut Up and Rap"	Billy Loman	0:06
2.	"The War Begins" (featuring Inspectah Deck, Chris Rivers & H Blanco)	Billy Loman	3:07
3.	"Get Away" (featuring Skyzoo, Torae & Reks)	Billy Loman	5:08
4.	"I'm Good" (featuring Michael Christmas & Astro)	Billy Loman	3:45
5.	"Can't Take It Anymore" (featuring Cortez, Chilla Jones & Doo Wop)	Billy Loman	3:53
6.	"Don't Know" (featuring Chasen Hampton)	Billy Loman	3:38
7.	"I Fucks with You" (featuring Lumidee & Cyrus DeShield)	Billy Loman	3:44
8.	"Thug Muzik" (featuring H Blanco & Ea$y Money)	Billy Loman & The Arcitype	4:38
9.	"Photo Shoot Fresh" (featuring Wais P & Dutch ReBelle)	Billy Loman	3:53
10.	"Oh Yes!" (featuring SuperSTah Snuk & Ea$y Money)	Billy Loman	4:12
11.	"Realty" (featuring Ea$y Money & Hectic)	Billy Loman	3:05
12.	"Depths of Hell" (featuring Slaine & Artisin)	Billy Loman	2:26
13.	"Pour Out a Bottle of Rose" (featuring Reks)	Billy Loman	3:06
14.	"My Time 2 Shine" (featuring Lil Fame)	Termanology, The Arcitype, & Artisin	4:00
15.	"El Wave" (featuring Willie The Kid & Reks)	The Alchemist & Statik Selektah	3:05
16.	"Streetwise"	The Mighty Moe	2:52
Total length:			54:38
