= Rhythmatic Eternal King Supreme =

Studio album by Reks
- Released: March 8, 2011
- Recorded: 2010
- Genre: Hip hop
- Label: ShowOff Records, Brick Records
- Producer: The Alchemist, DJ Premier, Statik Selektah, Fizzy Womack, Hi-Tek, Sean C & LV, Nottz, Pete Rock, Sha Money XL

Reks chronology
| More Grey Hairs (2009) | Rhythmatic Eternal King Supreme (2011) | Straight, No Chaser (2012) |

Professional ratings
Review scores
| Source | Rating |
|---|---|
| Exclaim! | (no rating) |
| HipHopDX | 4/5 stars |
| RapReviews | 9/10 |

Rhythmatic Eternal King Supreme is the fifth studio album by rapper Reks. The album was released on March 8, 2011, under ShowOff and Brick Records. The album received favorable reviews from most music critics. The album was nominated for Hip-Hop Album of the Year for the Boston Music Awards and the UMA. It features production from producers including The Alchemist, DJ Premier, Pete Rock, Nottz and Hi-Tek.

== Track listing ==
| No. | Title | Producer | Length |
|---|---|---|---|
| 1. | "25th Hour" | DJ Premier | 4:12 |
| 2. | "Thin Line" | Pete Rock | 3:22 |
| 3. | "Limelight" | Nottz | 3:47 |
| 4. | "Kill Em" | Sean C & LV | 3:15 |
| 5. | "This or That" | Statik Selektah | 3:26 |
| 6. | "Why Cry" (featuring Styles P) | The Alchemist | 3:21 |
| 7. | "Face Off" (featuring Termanology) | Sha Money XL | 4:02 |
| 8. | "The Wonder Years" | Hi-Tek | 3:59 |
| 9. | "This Is Me" (featuring DJ Corbett) | Mike Frey | 3:26 |
| 10. | "Mr. Nobody" | Statik Selektah | 4:27 |
| 11. | "The Underdog" | Blaze P | 3:24 |
| 12. | "U Know" (featuring Freeway) | Hi-Tek | 4:46 |
| 13. | "Cigarettes" (featuring Lil' Fame) | Fizzy Womack | 4:21 |
| 14. | "Mascara (The Ugly Truth)" | Statik Selektah | 3:40 |
| 15. | "Like A Star" | Statik Selektah | 3:52 |
| 16. | "Self Titled (Bonus Track)" | Statik Selektah | 3:20 |

== Charts ==
| Chart (2011) | Peak position |
|---|---|
| US Heatseekers Albums (Billboard) | 41 |
| US Top R&B/Hip-Hop Albums (Billboard) | 72 |
