= Out the Gate =

Out the Gate may refer to:

- Out the Gate (album), a 2006 album by Termanology and DC the Midi Alien
- Out the Gate (film), a 2011 Jamaican action film
