= Grey Hairs =

Studio album by Reks
- Released: July 22, 2008
- Recorded: 2007–2008
- Genre: Hip hop
- Label: ShowOff Records
- Producers: DJ Premier, Statik Selektah, Large Professor, Blaze P, Soul Theory, DC the Midi Alien, 1914, Demobeatz

Reks chronology
Rekless (2003)	Grey Hairs (2008)	More Grey Hairs (2009)

Grey Hairs is the third studio album by American rapper Reks. The album was released on July 22, 2008 through ShowOff Records.

== Track listing ==
No.	Title	Producer	Length
1.	"Grey Hairs"	Blaze P	4:25
2.	"The One"	Statik Selektah	2:54
3.	"Say Goodnight"	DJ Premier	3:35
4.	"How Can It Be"	Statik Selektah	4:00
5.	"Stages"	Large Professor	3:58
6.	"All In One (5 Mics)" (featuring Lil' Fame)	Blaze P	3:42
7.	"Next 2 Me"	DC the Midi Alien	3:54
8.	"Money on the Ave" (featuring Skyzoo)	Soul Theory	4:16
9.	"Black Cream (The Negro Epidemic)" (featuring Big Shug)	Statik Selektah	4:16
10.	"Love Sweet Misery"	Statik Selektah	4:01
11.	"Rise"	Statik Selektah	3:36
12.	"Telescopes" (featuring Jon Hope & Lucky Dice)	Statik Selektah	3:34
13.	"Day 2"	Statik Selektah	3:54
14.	"Premonition" (featuring Termanology & Consequence)	Statik Selektah	3:38
15.	"My Life" (additional vocals Paula Campbell)	Blaze P	3:07
16.	"Cry Baby"	Statik Selektah	3:56
17.	"Long While"	1914	4:06
18.	"Big Dreamers (Lawtown Remix)" (featuring Krumb Snatcha & Termanology)	Statik Selektah	3:35
19.	"Isiah"	Demobeatz	4:00
20.	"Pray For Me"	Statik Selektah	2:14

Track 6, “All In One (5 Mics)” would be included in the soundtrack for 2008 racing game Midnight Club: Los Angeles.
