= The Evening News EP =

EP by 1982 (Statik Selektah & Termanology)
- Released: December 26, 2010
- Recorded: 2010
- Genre: Hip hop
- Length: 21:47
- Label: ST. Records, ShowOff Records
- Producer: Statik Selektah

1982 (Statik Selektah & Termanology) chronology
1982 The EP (2010)	The Evening News EP (2010)	2012 (2012)

The Evening News EP is the second EP by American hip hop duo 1982, composed of Statik Selektah and Termanology.

== Track listing ==
- All songs produced by Statik Selektah.

No.	Title	Length
1.	"Start It Like This"	2:49
2.	"Money Is Reality" (featuring Action Bronson)	2:54
3.	"Chill As Hell"	2:20
4.	"Timothy McVeigh" (featuring Wais P)	2:23
5.	"Assassins" (featuring Kali & Ghetto)	3:24
6.	"Always" (Statik’s Interlude)	1:29
7.	"Baby Mama" (featuring Josh Xantus)	3:34
8.	"Chasing Diamonds" (featuring Wais P)	2:58
Total length:		21:47
