= Hood Politics =

Hood Politics may refer to:

- Hood Politics, a series of mixtapes by Termanology
- "Hood Politics", a song by Kendrick Lamar from the 2015 album To Pimp a Butterfly
