= G.O.Y.A. (Gunz Or Yay Available) =

Studio album by Termanology
- Released: October 8, 2013
- Recorded: 2012–2013
- Studio: The Bomb Shelter in Lawrence; Wonka Sound in Lowell; The Showoff Basement in Brooklyn
- Genre: Hip-hop
- Length: 51:20
- Label: ST. Records, Showoff Records, Brick Records
- Producer: Shortfyuz; DJ Deadeye; The Arcitype

Termanology chronology
Fizzyology (2012)	G.O.Y.A. (Gunz Or Yay Available) (2013)	Mas G.O.Y.A. (2014)

Singles from G.O.Y.A. (Gunz Or Yay Available)
- 1. "Straight Off The Block" Released: July 25, 2013; 2. "100 More Jewelz" Released: August 22, 2013; 3. "Judo" Released: September 10, 2013; 4. "You Ain't Safe" Released: September 26, 2013; 5. "Take My Turn" Released: October 8, 2013

G.O.Y.A. (Gunz Or Yay Available) is the second studio album by American rapper Termanology, released on October 8, 2013, through his own record label, ST. Records, Statik Selektah's Showoff Records, and Boston based label Brick Records.

== Background ==
The album includes guest appearances from Action Bronson, Chris Rivers, Dice Raw, DJ Kay Slay, DJ Premier, Doo Wop, Ea$y Money, H Blanco, Inspectah Deck, Juju, Lee Wilson, Lil Fame, Maffew Ragazino, N.O.R.E., Reks, Sheek Louch, Sway Calloway, Tony Touch and Wais P. The album is mostly produced by Shortfyuz.

== Singles ==
On July 25, 2013, the first single from the album, "Straight Off The Block" featuring DJ Kay Slay, Sheek Louch & Lil Fame, was released. The official music video for the single was released on October 11, 2013. On August 22, 2013, he released the second single "100 More Jewelz". On September 10, 2013, he released the third single "Judo" featuring N.O.R.E. The official music video for the single was released on September 18, 2013. On September 26, 2013, he released the fourth single "You Ain't Safe". On October 8, 2013, he released the fifth and final single "Take My Turn".

== Track listing ==
- All tracks produced by Shortfyuz except tracks 3 & 13, co-produced by DJ Deadeye and The Arcitype.

No.	Title	Length
1.	"STV News" (featuring Sway Calloway)	0:25
2.	"Scandalous" (featuring Chris Rivers)	2:50
3.	"Pulp Fiction" (featuring Reks)	3:26
4.	"Judo" (featuring N.O.R.E.)	2:47
5.	"American Dreamin"	3:11
6.	"Back In The Day"	3:16
7.	"G.O.Y.A. (skit)" (featuring Large Professor, Lil Fame, Pete Rock & DJ Premier)	0:42
8.	"Sazon" (featuring H Blanco & Ea$y Money)	3:27
9.	"Straight Off The Block" (featuring DJ Kay Slay, Sheek Louch & Lil Fame)	3:57
10.	"Secret Location"	3:02
11.	"Compra" (featuring Tony Touch & Doo Wop)	3:42
12.	"Juju (skit)" (featuring Juju)	0:50
13.	"Take My Turn" (featuring Action Bronson & Jared Evan)	3:21
14.	"Cocaine Eyes" (featuring Wais P)	3:50
15.	"You Ain't Safe" (featuring Inspectah Deck & Maffew Ragazino)	3:40
16.	"Black Hole" (featuring Lee Wilson & Dice Raw)	3:45
17.	"100 More Jewelz"	5:09
Total length:		51:20
