= Straight, No Chaser (Reks album) =

Studio album by Reks
- Released: April 24, 2012
- Recorded: 2011–2012
- Genre: Hip hop
- Labels: Showoff; Brick
- Producer: Statik Selektah

Reks chronology
Rhythmatic Eternal King Supreme (2011)	Straight, No Chaser (2012)	REBELutionary (2012)

Straight, No Chaser is the sixth studio album by American rapper Reks. The album is produced in its entirety by Statik Selektah. The album was released on April 24, 2012, under ShowOff and Brick. It features other Boston rappers such as Termanology, Kali, Slaine and more.

== Track listing ==
- All songs produced by Statik Selektah

No.	Title	Length
1.	"Autographs"	4:29
2.	"Sit/Think/Drink"	4:16
3.	"Power Lines" (featuring Ea$y Money)	3:47
4.	"Riggs & Murtaugh" (featuring Action Bronson)	2:55
5.	"Such a Showoff" (featuring Kali, JFK and Termanology)	2:36
6.	"Cancel That" (featuring Wais P)	3:59
7.	"Parenthood"	3:03
8.	"Break Ups" (featuring C-Sharp)	3:59
9.	"Chasin’"	3:36
10.	"Sins" (featuring Alias)	2:20
11.	"Straight, No Chaser" (featuring Slaine)	3:15
12.	"Lost In Translation"	3:18
13.	"Regrets"	3:37
14.	"730"	2:33
