= Population Control (album) =

Studio album by Statik Selektah
- Released: October 25, 2011
- Recorded: 2010–2011
- Genre: Hip-hop
- Length: 72:29
- Label: Showoff; Duck Down
- Producer: Statik Selektah

Statik Selektah chronology
100 Proof: The Hangover (2010)	Population Control (2011)	Extended Play (2013)

Singles from Population Control
- 1. "Live & Let Live" Released: October 11, 2011; 2. "Groupie Love" Released: October 18, 2011

Population Control is the fourth studio album by East Coast hip-hop producer Statik Selektah. The album was released on October 25, 2011. The album features guest appearances from Sean Price, Termanology, Big K.R.I.T., Freddie Gibbs, Mac Miller, Styles P, Saigon, Jared Evan, Action Bronson, Bun B, Talib Kweli, XV, Colin Munroe, Lil Fame, Pill, Reks, Mitchy Slick, Dom Kennedy, Strong Arm Steady, Skyzoo, Chuuwee, Nitty Scott, MC, Rapsody, Smoke DZA, Joell Ortiz, Brother Ali, Lecrae, DJ Premier, DJ Babu and Scram Jones among others. The album debuted at number 11 on the US Billboard Top Heatseekers chart in the first week of its release.

== Critical reception ==
Professional ratings
Review scores
Source	Rating
AllMusic	3.5/5 stars
DJBooth	4/5 stars
HipHopDX	3.5/5 stars
XXL	(L)

Population Control was met with positive reviews from music critics. Edwin Ortiz of HipHopDX gave the album three and a half stars out of five, saying "Statik Selektah may cosign all the rappers present on Population Control, but it's evident that his approval doesn't necessarily translate to a pristine collaboration in every instance. Still, as an artist who has built his reputation on consistency, his latest effort is a fairly solid project that likewise keeps the embers of Hip Hop glowing with passion." Jesse Gissen of XXL gave the album an L, saying "The biggest problem with the album is Statik's need to include everyone in the party. A lot of the tracks felt too cluttered with MCs that lacked chemistry together ("Sam Jack" and "Down") and with 20 tracks, the LP dragged towards the middle before picking up steam at the end. Luckily for listeners, Statik's ability to flip a beat never disappoints, as he makes sure to keep heads nodding no matter whose turn it is on the mic. Hopefully, next time Statik will be a little more selective on whom he decides to include in the general population."

Nathan S. of DJBooth gave the album four out of five stars, saying "The explosion of wack rappers we're currently living through can often feel like it's threatening to take over, but trying to suppress them is a fool's approach. Like a zombie rap invasion, no matter how many you kill it will never be enough. Instead the only way to ensure the survival of the dope rap species is to strengthen from within, make the music indestructibly good. So, without exaggeration, Statik's not only put together a nice album, he's fired a powerful shot in the war to keep truly quality music alive. It's exactly the kind of Population Control the game so badly needs." Jon O'Brien of AllMusic gave the album three and a half stars out of five, saying "Of course, Population Control could have been released at any point over the last 20 years, but while it's not going to change the face of the hip-hop scene, it's a classy and authentic old-school affair which effortlessly brings together two of its very different generations."

== Commercial performance ==
The album debuted at number 11 on the US Billboard Top Heatseekers chart in the first week of its release.

== Track listing ==
- All songs produced by Statik Selektah

No.	Title	Length
1.	"Population Control" (featuring Sean Price & Termanology)	2:06
2.	"Play the Game" (featuring Big K.R.I.T. & Freddie Gibbs)	3:49
3.	"Groupie Love" (featuring Mac Miller & Josh Xantus)	3:01
4.	"New York, New York" (featuring Styles P, Saigon & Jared Evan)	3:12
5.	"Sam Jack" (featuring XV, Jon Connor & The Kid Daytona)	4:00
6.	"Never a Dull Moment" (featuring Action Bronson, Termanology & Bun B)	3:57
7.	"You're Gone" (featuring Talib Kweli, Colin Munroe & Lil Fame)	3:46
8.	"They Don't Know" (featuring Pill & Reks)	4:32
9.	"Down" (featuring Push! Montana & Lep Bogus Boys)	3:50
10.	"Let's Build" (featuring Chace Infinite, JFK, Mitchy Slick & Wais P)	4:04
11.	"Smoke On" (featuring Dom Kennedy & Strong Arm Steady)	4:03
12.	"The High Life" (featuring Kali, Isaac Castor & Chris Webby)	3:33
13.	"Half Moon Part" (featuring Skyzoo, Chuuwee & Tayyib Ali)	3:56
14.	"Black Swan" (featuring Nitty Scott, MC & Rapsody)	3:51
15.	"Harlem Blues" (featuring Smoke DZA)	3:14
16.	"Gold In 3D" (featuring STS & Dosage)	3:08
17.	"Damn Right" (featuring Joell Ortiz & Brother Ali)	4:43
18.	"Live & Let Live" (featuring Lecrae)	3:25
19.	"A DJ Saved My Life" (featuring DJ Premier, DJ Babu, Scram Jones & DJ Craze)	6:22
Total length:		72:29

iTunes bonus track
No.	Title	Length
20.	"4Gs" (featuring Easy Money, Termanology, Scram Jones & Wais P)	3:36

== Charts ==
Chart (2011)	Peak position
US Heatseekers Albums (Billboard)	11
US Top R&B/Hip-Hop Albums (Billboard)	39
