= 1982 (Statik Selektah and Termanology album) =

Studio album by 1982 (Statik Selektah & Termanology)
- Released: October 26, 2010
- Studio: Showoff Bassment (Brooklyn, NY); Wonka Sound (Lowell, MA); Frum Skratch Productions (Lawrence, MA)
- Genre: Hip-hop
- Length: 52:00
- Label: ShowOff; Brick
- Producer: Statik Selektah

1982 (Statik Selektah & Termanology) chronology
1982 (2010)	2012 (2012)

Statik Selektah chronology
100 Proof: The Hangover (2010)	1982 (2010)	Population Control (2011)

Termanology chronology
Politics as Usual (2008)	1982 (2010)	S.T.R.E.E.T. (Speakin' Thru Real Experience Every Time) (2011)

Professional ratings
Review scores
Source	Rating
The Austin Chronicle	3/4 stars
HipHopDX	3.5/5
RapReviews	8/10

1982 is the first full-length collaborative studio album by American rapper Termanology and hip-hop record producer Statik Selektah. It was released on October 26, 2010 via ShowOff/Brick Records. The album was recorded at the Showoff Bassment in Brooklyn, with additional recording took place at Wonka Sound in Lowell and at Frum Skratch Productions in Lawrence. Produced entirely by Statik Selektah, it features guest appearances from M.O.P., Bun B, Cassidy, Freeway, Inspectah Deck, Jared Evan, Masspike Miles, Saigon, Styles P, Reks and Xzibit. The album peaked at number 52 on the Top R&B/Hip-Hop Albums and number 26 on the Heatseekers Albums charts in the United States.

The album's title, which signifies the year of birth of both artists, also served as the name of the duo under which they release their subsequent projects, such as a sophomore 2012.

== Track listing ==
No.	Title	Length
1.	"The World Renown"	5:17
2.	"People Are Running"	2:30
3.	"Things I Dream" (featuring Lil' Fame)	3:03
4.	"Goin' Back" (featuring Cassidy and Xzibit)	2:35
5.	"The Radio"	3:09
6.	"Wedding Bells" (featuring Jared Evan)	3:17
7.	"You Should Go Home" (featuring Bun B and Masspike Miles)	3:42
8.	"Tell Me Lies" (featuring Styles P)	3:19
9.	"Life Is What You Make It" (featuring Saigon and Freeway)	3:05
10.	"Freedom" (featuring Reks)	3:48
11.	"Still Waiting"	2:52
12.	"The Street Life"	3:16
13.	"Thugathon 2010" (featuring M.O.P.)	3:12
14.	"The Hood Is on Fire" (featuring Inspectah Deck)	3:23
15.	"Born in '82"	2:42
16.	"Help"	3:16

== Charts ==
Chart (2010)	Peak position
US Top R&B/Hip-Hop Albums (Billboard)	52
US Heatseekers Albums (Billboard)	26
