= Fizzyology =

Studio album by Lil Fame and Termanology
- Released: November 6, 2012
- Genre: Hip-hop
- Length: 49:56
- Label: Brick Records
- Producer: DJ Premier; Fizzy Womack; J-Waxx Garfield; Statik Selektah; The Alchemist

Lil' Fame chronology
Fizzyology (2012)	Price of Fame (2019)

Termanology chronology
2012 (2012)	Fizzyology (2012)	GOYA (2013)

Professional ratings
Review scores
Source	Rating
AllHipHop	8.5/10
HipHopDX	3.5/5
RapReviews	7.5/10
XXL	L (3/5)

Fizzyology is a collaborative studio album by American rappers Lil Fame and Termanology. It was released on November 6, 2012 via Brick Records. Beside Lil Fame, who produced the majority of the project under his production moniker Fizzy Womack, the rest of the production was handled by Statik Selektah, Alchemist, DJ Premier and Jay "J-Waxx" Garfield. It features guest appearances from Bun B, Busta Rhymes, Freeway, Kira, Lee Wilson, Styles P, and M.O.P. cohort Billy Danze.

== Track listing ==
No.	Title	Producer(s)	Length
1.	"After Midnight"	Fizzy Womack	2:41
2.	"Fizzyology"	The Alchemist	2:58
3.	"Hustler's Ringtone" (featuring Bun B)	Fizzy Womack	4:02
4.	"The Greatest"	Fizzy Womack	3:11
5.	"From the Streets" (featuring Freeway)	Statik Selektah	3:44
6.	"Play Dirty" (featuring Busta Rhymes and Styles P)	DJ Premier	4:07
7.	"It's Easy"	Fizzy Womack	2:41
8.	"Too Tough for TV"	Fizzy Womack	2:41
9.	"Pray for Me" (featuring Kira)	Fizzy Womack	3:11
10.	"Not By You"	J-Waxx Garfield	3:33
11.	"Family Ties"	Fizzy Womack	3:54
12.	"Endtro (Fame & Glory)"	Fizzy Womack	2:05
13.	"Lil Ghetto Boy" (featuring Lee Wilson)	Fizzy Womack	3:59
14.	"Crazy" (featuring M.O.P.)	Statik Selektah	4:42
15.	"Thuggathon"	Statik Selektah	2:27
Total length:			49:56
