= The Proposal (album) =

Studio album by Ransom & Statik Selektah
- Released: September 30, 2013
- Recorded: 2013
- Genre: East Coast hip hop, hardcore hip hop
- Label: Showoff Records, Presidential Lifestyle
- Producer: Statik Selektah

Statik Selektah chronology
Extended Play (2013)	The Proposal (2013)	Still Blue (2014)

Ransom chronology
Street Cinema (2008)	The Proposal (2013)

The Proposal is a collaborative studio album by producer/DJ Statik Selektah and the American rapper, Ransom. The project was finished within four days. The album features guest appearances from Easy Money, Styles P, and Termanology.

== Critical response ==
Professional ratings
Review scores
Source	Rating
Exclaim!	8/10
The Source	(positive)

The Proposal was met with generally positive reviews from music critics.

== Track listing ==
- All songs produced by Statik Selektah.

No.	Title	Length
1.	"I Do"	2:55
2.	"Unexplainable"	3:09
3.	"Outcast" (featuring Ea$y Money)	4:16
4.	"Life of Sin"	3:06
5.	"How It Feels"	3:54
6.	"Jade"	3:29
7.	"1996"	1:39
8.	"It's Ransom" (featuring Styles P)	3:07
9.	"Reservoir Scars"	2:46
10.	"Start 2 Finish"	2:33

CD Exclusive bonus tracks
No.	Title	Length
11.	"Never Forget" (featuring Termanology)	2:50
12.	"Dollars & Sense"	2:50
