= TrillStatik =

Studio album by Bun B & Statik Selektah
- Released: April 20, 2019
- Recorded: April 17, 2019
- Genre: Southern hip hop
- Length: 28:45 (standard version); 38:38 (deluxe version)
- Label: II Trill; Showoff; Empire
- Producer: Statik Selektah

Bun B chronology
Return of the Trill (2018)	TrillStatik (2019)	Mo Trill (2022)

Statik Selektah chronology
8 (2017)	TrillStatik (2019)	Gran Turismo (2019)

TrillStatik is a collaborative studio album by producer/DJ Statik Selektah and American rapper Bun B. The album features guest appearances from Method Man, Fat Joe, Smoke DZA, Westside Gunn, Uncle Murda, Big K.R.I.T., Talib Kweli and Paul Wall, among others. It was created entirely during an 11 hour livestream on YouTube, and was initially released exclusively through Tidal on April 20, 2019.

== Background ==
Bun B initially announced he and producer Statik Selektah would be creating an album from scratch on livestream through his Instagram on April 12, 2019. On April 19, the tracklist was revealed. The creation of the album was streamed live on April 17, beginning at 5:00 pm EST, and lasted 11 hours and 37 minutes. The mastered version of the album was released to streaming services on April 20.

== Track listing ==
- All songs produced by Statik Selektah.

No.	Title	Length
1.	"Moving Mountains" (featuring Jovanie)	1:42
2.	"Still Trill" (featuring Method Man and Grafh)	2:53
3.	"Basquiat" (featuring Fat Joe and Smoke DZA)	4:13
4.	"Concrete" (featuring Westside Gunn and Termanology)	2:45
5.	"Money" (featuring Fame and Wais P)	2:19
6.	"Superstar^{[a]}" (featuring Meechy Darko, CJ Fly and Haile Supreme)	4:09
7.	"Paperwork" (featuring Uncle Murda)	1:42
8.	"TBA" (featuring Propain and Killa Kyleon)	2:46
9.	"Time Flies" (featuring Big K.R.I.T. and Talib Kweli)	3:57
10.	"I Know" (featuring Haile Supreme)	2:18
Total length:		28:45

Deluxe edition bonus tracks
No.	Title	Length
11.	"All Good" (featuring Tobe Nwigwe)	3:05
12.	"Jon Snow" (featuring Paul Wall and Le$)	2:46
13.	"Lemons"	2:01
14.	"How the Game Go"	2:06
Total length:		38:38

Notes

- ^{^[a]} Track 6 "Superstar" is titled as "Superstarr" on all digital platforms iTunes, Amazon, Tidal, Spotify, SoundCloud, Deezer and Google Play.
