= Spell My Name Right: The Album =

Studio album by Statik Selektah
- Released: November 6, 2007
- Recorded: 2006–2007
- Genre: Hip hop
- Length: 60:11
- Label: Showoff Records, Brick Records
- Producer: Statik Selektah

Statik Selektah chronology
Spell My Name Right: The Album (2007)	Stick 2 the Script (2008)

Professional ratings
Review scores
Source	Rating
HipHopDX	4/5
RapReviews	8.5/10
XXL	L (3/5)

Spell My Name Right: The Album is the debut studio album by East Coast hip hop producer/DJ Statik Selektah, released on November 6, 2007, through Brick Records and the musician's own Showoff Records imprint. Following his success as a DJ on the collaborative mixtapes with Nas and G-Unit, on Spell My Name Right Statik Selektah wanted to highlight himself as a producer, producing the entire album. Spell My Name Right received mostly positive reception from both music critics and listeners.

== Track listing ==
- All songs produced by Statik Selektah

No.	Title	Length
1.	"Spell My Name Right (Intro)" (featuring DJ Premier & Termanology)	1:31
2.	"Stop, Look, Listen" (featuring Styles P, Termanology & Q-Tip)	3:46
3.	"Express Yourself '08" (featuring Termanology, Talib Kweli & Consequence)	3:21
4.	"6 in the Morning" (featuring Joell Ortiz, Kool G Rap & Sheek Louch)	3:39
5.	"What Would You Do!?" (featuring Freeway & Cassidy)	3:12
6.	"Make a Movie (Interlude)" (featuring DJ Khaled)	0:45
7.	"Bam Bam" (featuring Red Café, Termanology & Mims)	3:08
8.	"G-Shit (Showoff Mix)" (featuring Uncle Murda, Sev-One, Termanology & Jadakiss)	4:13
9.	"Back Against the Wall" (featuring Royce da 5'9" & Cormega)	2:33
10.	"Hardcore (So You Wanna Be)" (featuring Reks & Termanology)	3:49
11.	"No Mistakes Allowed" (featuring Doug E. Fresh, Tony Touch, Scram Jones, Dp-One, DJ Gi-Joe, DJ Revolution & Esoteric)	4:09
12.	"Knockin' Em Out (Interlude)" (featuring Clinton Sparks)	0:48
13.	"Punch Out!" (featuring Big Shug)	2:13
14.	"The Good Life (Give It Up)" (featuring Lil Fame)	1:06
15.	"Big Dreamers" (featuring Reks)	3:34
16.	"No Holding Back" (featuring AZ & Cormega)	2:48
17.	"Got Me Goin' (Hip Hop)" (featuring Slum Village & Granite State)	3:22
18.	"Time to Say Goodbye" (featuring Evidence & The Alchemist)	2:17
19.	"It's Over Now" (featuring Termanology & A.G.)	2:42
20.	"Talk to Me" (featuring Jon Hope, Reks & Skyzoo)	3:36
21.	"Did What We Had to Do (Showoff Mix)" (featuring KRS-One, Larry Cheeba & Large Professor)	3:39
