= Lord Giveth, Lord Taketh Away =

EP by Freddie Gibbs and Statik Selektah
- Released: June 24, 2011
- Recorded: June 22, 2011 (Brooklyn, New York)
- Genre: Hip hop; gangsta rap
- Length: 18:53
- Label: Showoff; CTE World
- Producer: Statik Selektah

Freddie Gibbs chronology
Str8 Killa (2010)	Lord Giveth, Lord Taketh Away (2011)	Cold Day In Hell (2011)

LP Reissue cover art

Professional ratings
Review scores
Source	Rating
HipHopDX	3/5 stars
Consequence of Sound	C−
Pitchfork	7.2/10

Lord Giveth, Lord Taketh Away is a collaborative EP by American rapper Freddie Gibbs and producer Statik Selektah. It was released on June 24, 2011, by Showoff Records and CTE World.

== Background ==
Freddie Gibbs recorded the mixtape in 24 hours with DJ Statik Selektah in a studio in Brooklyn, New York.

== Critical reception ==
In a review for Pitchfork, critic reviewer Tom Breihan wrote: "Lord Giveth remains a solid showcase for one of our most solid rappers." At HipHopDX, Luke Gibson explained: "Lord Giveth, Lord Taketh Away is an inspired project from two of Hip Hop’s most heralded. For Gibbs it builds upon the foundation that his mixtape grind has created."

== Track listing ==
All tracks are produced by Statik Selektah

No.	Title	Length
1.	"Intro" (featuring Slaine)	0:40
2.	"Lord Giveth, Lord Taketh Away"	2:50
3.	"Rap Money" (featuring Daz Dillinger)	2:45
4.	"Affiliated" (featuring Reks and PUSH! Montana)	2:21
5.	"Wild Style" (featuring Termanology and Fred the Godson)	3:44
6.	"Already" (featuring Trae tha Truth)	2:56
7.	"Keep It Warm for Ya" (featuring Smoke DZA and Chace Infinite)	3:40
Total length:		18:53

Pre-order bonus tracks

No.	Title	Length
8.	"Fallin’" (feat. 1982)	2:54
9.	"Crushin Feelings"	3:42
Total length:		25:29

2018 Vinyl Reissue bonus tracks

No.	Title	Length
8.	"Carry On" (feat. Joey Bada$$)	3:27
9.	"Crushin Feelings"	3:42
Total length:		26:02

2026 Vinyl Reissue bonus tracks

No.	Title	Length
9.	"Serve Or Get Served"	1:34
Total length:		27:36

Notes

- 2026 reissue also includes tracks from 2018 reissue, moving track 9 to track 10
