= Anti-Hero (Slaine and Termanology album) =

Studio album by Slaine and Termanology
- Released: October 6, 2017
- Recorded: 2015–17
- Genre: Hip-hop
- Length: 49:32
- Label: ST. Records; Brick Records
- Producer: Termanology (also exec.); The Arcitype; Artisin; Billy Loman; DC The Midi Alien; DJ Premier; Evidence; Psycho Les; Statik Selektah

Slaine chronology
Slaine Is Dead (2016)	Anti-Hero (2017)	One Day (2019)

Termanology chronology
More Politics (2016)	Anti-Hero (2017)	Bad Decisions (2018)

Singles from Anti-Hero
- 1. "Land of the Lost" Released: August 22, 2017; 2. "Came a Long Way" Released: September 12, 2017

Anti-Hero is a collaborative studio album by Slaine and Termanology. It was released on October 6, 2017, through Termanology's own record label, ST. Records and Boston based label, Brick Records.

External videos
- Slaine vs. Termanology - "Land Of The Lost" Official Video (August 22, 2017)
- Slaine vs. Termanology - "Anti-Hero" ft. Bun B & Everlast (prod. by DJ Premier) Official Video (October 11, 2017)
- Slaine vs. Termanology "Life Of A Drug Addict" (November 2, 2017)

== Background ==
The album includes guest appearances from Bun B, Catero, Chris Rivers, Conway, DJ Revolution, Ea$y Money, Everlast, Ill Bill, Jared Evan, Madchild, Nems, Ras Kass, and Sick Jacken. The album features production from Artisin, Billy Loman, DC The Midi Alien, DJ Premier, Evidence, Psycho Les, Statik Selektah, Termanology and The Arcitype.

== Singles ==
On August 22, 2017, the first single from the album, "Land Of The Lost" was released as well as the music video. On September 12, 2017, they released the second single "Came A Long Way" featuring Conway. The official music video for the single was released on November 1, 2016.

== Track listing ==
No.	Title	Producer(s)	Length
1.	"Still Here"	The Arcitype	3:49
2.	"Anti-Hero" (featuring Bun B and Everlast)	DJ Premier	4:05
3.	"Life of a Drug Addict" (featuring Catero)	Evidence	2:53
4.	"Some Other Shit" (featuring Madchild and DJ Revolution)	Statik Selektah	4:12
5.	"Apocalypse" (featuring Nems and Ill Bill)	Billy Loman	3:41
6.	"Land of the Lost"	Statik Selektah	2:48
7.	"Bringing Much Terror" (featuring Chris Rivers)	Psycho Les	3:28
8.	"Blink of an Eye" (featuring Ras Kass)	Statik Selektah	3:41
9.	"Snakes" (featuring Sick Jacken and Jared Evan)	Termanology; Artisin; The Arcitype^{[a]}	3:44
10.	"The Demon's Peace"	The Arcitype	3:01
11.	"It Doesn't Matter"	DC The Midi Alien	2:43
12.	"Blood In My Eyes" (featuring Ea$y Money)	Billy Loman	3:50
13.	"Comeback Story"	The Arcitype	3:23
14.	"Came a Long Way" (featuring Conway)	Billy Loman	4:14
Total length:			49:32

Notes

- ^{^[a]} signifies a co-producer
