= Boom Bap & Blues =

Studio album by Jared Evan & Statik Selektah
- Released: February 26, 2013
- Recorded: 2013
- Genre: R&B; Hip hop
- Length: 37:02
- Label: Showoff; Jared Evan
- Producer: Statik Selektah

Jared Evan chronology
The 4th Chapter (2012)	Boom Bap & Blues (2013)	Pieces (2013)

Statik Selektah chronology
Ambition (2012)	Boom Bap & Blues (2013)	Extended Play (2013)

Singles from Boom Bap & Blues
- 1. "Are We Almost There Yet?" Released: February 19, 2013; 2. "Uma Thurman" Released: February 22, 2013; 3. "Pro Create" Released: February 28, 2013

Boom Bap & Blues is the first collaborative studio album by American singer-songwriter Jared Evan and producer Statik Selektah. The project was released on February 26, 2013. The album features guest appearances by Lil Fame of M.O.P., Joey Bada$$, Action Bronson, Wais P, Hoodie Allen and Termanology.

External videos
- Jared Evan & Statik Selektah – "Pro Create" feat. Action Bronson (Official Video) (October 29, 2013)
- Jared Evan & Statik Selektah – "Black & White" feat. Joey Badass (Official Video) (October 30, 2013)
- Jared Evan & Statik Selektah – "Are We Almost There Yet?" (Official Video) (October 31, 2013)

== Track listing ==
All songs produced by Statik Selektah.

No.	Title	Length
1.	"Blue"	2:32
2.	"Uma Thurman" (featuring Lil Fame)	3:38
3.	"The Devil Wears Prada"	3:15
4.	"Black & White" (featuring Joey Bada$$)	4:29
5.	"Pro Create" (featuring Action Bronson)	3:14
6.	"Television" (featuring Wais P)	4:11
7.	"Toast" (featuring Hoodie Allen)	3:42
8.	"Night Light" (featuring Termanology)	3:29
9.	"Are We Almost There Yet?"	3:43
10.	"Sunday"	1:47
11.	"Bad News"	3:02
