= Stick 2 the Script =

Studio album by Statik Selektah
- Released: October 21, 2008
- Recorded: 2008
- Genre: Hip-hop
- Length: 52:38
- Label: Showoff Records, Brick Records
- Producer: Statik Selektah

Statik Selektah chronology
Spell My Name Right: The Album (2007)	Stick 2 the Script (2008)	100 Proof: The Hangover (2010)

Professional ratings
Review scores
Source	Rating
DJBooth.net	3.5/5 stars
HipHopDX	3.5/5 stars
Pitchfork	(6.6/10)
XXL	4/5 stars

Stick 2 the Script is the second studio album by East Coast hip-hop producer Statik Selektah. It was released by Showoff Records and Brick Records on October 21, 2008. It is composed of 18 tracks—all containing production from Statik Selektah and rapping from featured artists. Much like Selektah's debut album, the album features well-established New York City rappers like Jadakiss, Q-Tip and Talib Kweli. It additionally features newer artists like Jon Hope and Reks, as well as Southern rappers like Bun B, West Coast rappers like Mistah F.A.B. and a slew of Massachusetts rappers on the song "Streets of M.A.". DJ Premier ranked the album 3rd in his top 20 albums of 2008 list.

== Track listing ==
- All songs produced by Statik Selektah

No.	Title	Length
1.	"Stick 2 the Script (Intro)"	0:54
2.	"To the Top (Stick 2 the Script)" (featuring Cassidy, Saigon & Termanology)	3:41
3.	"For the City" (featuring M.O.P. & Jadakiss)	3:43
4.	"Get Out the Way" (featuring Bun B & Cory Mo)	2:55
5.	"All 2gether Now" (featuring Freeway, Peedi Crakk & Young Chris)	3:29
6.	"Interlude" (featuring Q-Tip)	0:42
7.	"Church" (featuring Termanology)	2:41
8.	"Talkin Bout You (Ladies)" (featuring Skyzoo, Joell Ortiz & Talib Kweli)	3:37
9.	"On the Marquee" (featuring Little Brother, Joe Scudda & Chaundon)	3:44
10.	"Mr. Popularity" (featuring Consequence)	2:28
11.	"Interlude" (featuring Mad Rapper)	1:12
12.	"This Is It (Showoff Remix)" (featuring Black Rob, D-Dot & Redman)	3:06
13.	"So Good (Live From The Bar)" (featuring Naledge, Reks & CL Smooth)	4:04
14.	"Streets of M.A." (featuring Masspike Miles, Termanology, SuperSTah Snuk, Reks, Slaine, Ea$y Money, Frankie Wainwright & Smoke Bulga)	4:42
15.	"Sounds of the Street (Interlude)" (featuring JFK)	1:20
16.	"Destined to Shine" (featuring Torae, Sha Stimuli & Jon Hope)	3:20
17.	"Cali Nights" (featuring Glasses Malone, Mistah F.A.B. & Novel)	3:03
18.	"Take It All Back" (featuring Reks, Ea$y Money, Royce Da 5'9" & Paula Campbell)	3:56
Total length:		52:38
