= REBELutionary =

Studio album by Reks
- Released: July 23, 2012
- Genre: Hip hop
- Length: 50:53
- Label: Gracie Productions
- Producer: Numonics

Reks chronology
Straight, No Chaser (2012)	REBELutionary (2012)

REBELutionary is the seventh studio album by Massachusetts rapper Reks. It was released on July 23, 2012 by Gracie Productions. The album is the follow-up to Straight, No Chaser. The album was entirely produced by Numonics. It features guest appearances by Termanology, Krondon (of Strong Arm Steady), J. Nics, Jon Connor, Venessa Reece, Lucky Dice, Chi-Knox, Boycott Blues, Sene, Koncept, Knowledge Medina, DJ Heron, and Ea$y Money.

== Track listing ==
1. Intro
2. Unlearn
3. Hallelujah
4. Bang Bang (feat. J NICS)
5. Shotgun (feat. Jon Connor & Vanessa Renee)
6. War Is A Racket
7. Rebelutionary
8. Ignorance Is Bliss (feat. Termanology)
9. Passports
10. Ava Rice Interlude
11. Ava Rice (feat. Knowledge Medina & DJ Heron)
12. The Jones' (feat. Krondon)
13. The Edge (feat. Lucky Dice & Chi-Knox)
14. La Luna (feat. Sene, Koncept & Vanessa Renee)
15. Gepeto (Reality Is...)
16. Obedient Workers
17. Outro
18. Shotgun (Remix) (feat. Boycott Blues & Ea$y Money)
