= MC Bravado =

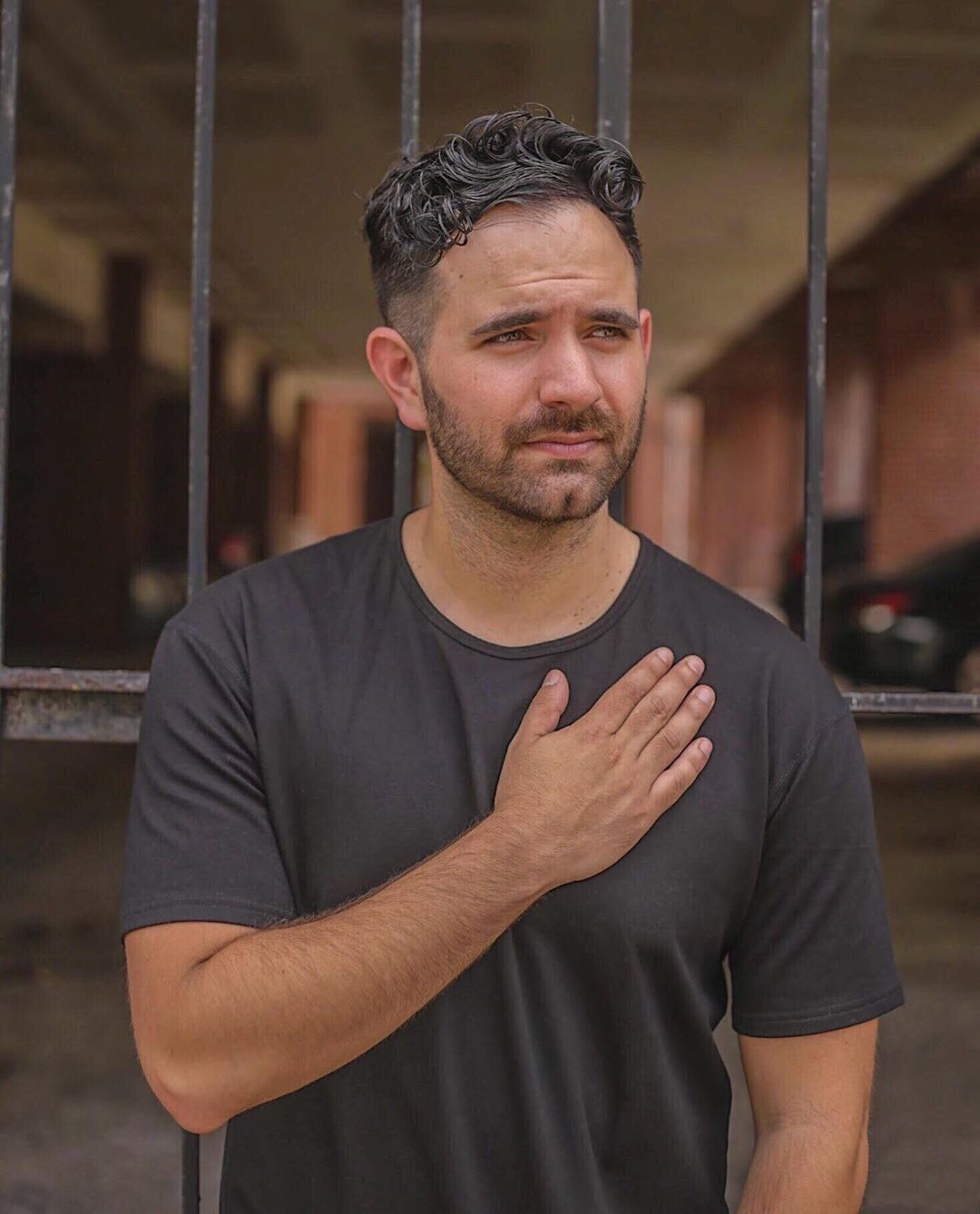
- MC Bravado 2019

Background information
- Born: Richard Anthony Croce; September 16, 1985 (age 40); White Plains, New York City
- Origin: Warwick, New York
- Genres: Hip hop
- Occupations: Rapper; Singer; Educator
- Instrument: Vocals
- Years active: 2011–present
- Label: Label Necklace
- Website: mcbravado.com

Richard Anthony Croce (born September 16, 1985), known professionally as MC Bravado, is an American rapper, songwriter, and educator from White Plains, New York.

He is best known for his remix EP "XEMIR" released in 2019. The EP featured New York City rap artist Nitty Scott.

== Career ==
Richard Croce was born in White Plains, New York. He released his first album "Dope Perspective" which was a collaborative release featuring fellow rapper C-Nature in 2011. MC Bravado followed up the next year in 2012 by releasing his debut solo album "The Illy-Ad". In 2014 he released his first solo EP "Walk The Line". MC Bravado gained national attention for his first collaborative single "Unfiltered" in 2017. That same year, MC Bravado followed with the releases of singles "This Is Gold" feat. OnCue & "Go Westbrook". Both singles were featured on his second album "Hip-Hop*" also released in 2017. In 2018, MC Bravado released his 3rd studio album "Like Water For Hangovers". The following year in 2019, MC Bravado released his critically acclaimed XEMIR(Remix EP). In March 2020, MC Bravado released his latest single "Dirty 30". In the summer of 2020, MC Bravado released his 4th studio album "The Living Game", with the lead single "Like Kobe" featuring rap artist Joell Ortiz produced by Height (musician). In April 2021, MC Bravado released "Yeah Baby".

Outside of his rap career, MC Bravado is also a teacher in Baltimore, Maryland.

== Discography ==
=== Albums and EPs ===
List of albums & eps, with selected details
Title	Details
Dope Perspective	Released: November 22, 2011; Label: Cypher Junkies; Formats: Digital download
The Illy-Ad	Released: February 29, 2012; Label: MC Bravado; Formats: Digital download
Walk the Line-EP	Released: October 13, 2014; Label: MC Bravado; Formats: Digital download
Hip-Hop*	Released: March 3, 2017; Label: MC Bravado; Formats: Digital download
Like Water For Hangovers	Released: June 1, 2018; Label: MC Bravado; Formats: Digital download
XEMIR (Remix EP)	Released: July 12, 2019; Label: MC Bravado; Formats: Digital download
The Living Game	Released: August 24, 2020; Label: Label Necklace; Formats: Digital download

== Singles ==
List of singles, showing year released and album name
Title	Year	Album
"Unfiltered feat. Nitty Scott, Real Deal, Time Police"	2017	Hip-Hop*
"This Is Gold featuring OnCue"	2017	Hip-Hop*
"Go Westbrook"	2017	Hip-Hop*
"(Im)personal Shit feat. Militant Marxman"	2017	Hip-Hop*
"Brand New Bag"	2018	Like Water For Hangovers
"Tread Lightly feat. SC Static, Statik Selektah"	2018	Like Water For Hangovers
"Same Old Song"	2018	Like Water For Hangovers
"This Is Gold (Marat Leon Remix)"	2019	Non-album single
"Dirty 30"	2020	Non-album single
"Yeah Baby"	2021	Non-album single
