= 100 Proof: The Hangover =

Studio album by Statik Selektah
- Released: February 2, 2010
- Genre: Hip-hop
- Length: 54:57
- Label: ShowOff; Brick
- Producer: Statik Selektah

Statik Selektah chronology
Stick 2 the Script (2008)	100 Proof: The Hangover (2010)	1982 (2010)

Professional ratings
Review scores
Source	Rating
AllMusic	3.5/5 stars
HipHopDX	3.5/5
Juice	4.5/6
XXL	L (3/5)

100 Proof: The Hangover is the third solo studio album by American hip-hop record producer Statik Selektah. It was released on February 2, 2010 via ShowOff/Brick Records. It features guest appearances from Kali, Termanology, JFK, Lil' Fame, Reks, Bun B, Colin Munroe, Consequence, Evidence, Fashawn, Freeway, Good Brotha, Havoc, Joe Scudda, Kool G Rap, Lee Wilson, Masspike Miles, Novel, Rapper Pooh, Red Café, Royce da 5'9", Saigon, Sean Price, Skyzoo, Souls of Mischief, Smif-N-Wessun, Styles P, Talib Kweli, Torae and Wale. The album debuted at number 37 on the Billboard Heatseekers Albums chart in the United States. The song "The Thrill Is Gone" was the album's first single.

== Track listing ==
No.	Title	Length
1.	"Inside a Change" (Intro)	1:08
2.	"So Close, So Far" (featuring Bun B, Wale and Colin Munroe)	3:02
3.	"Critically Acclaimed" (featuring Lil' Fame, Saigon and Sean Price)	3:25
4.	"Night People" (featuring Freeway, Red Café and Masspike Miles)	3:45
5.	"Follow We" (featuring Smif-N-Wessun)	3:31
6.	"Do It 2 Death" (featuring Lil' Fame, Havoc and Kool G Rap)	3:21
7.	"Come Around" (featuring Termanology and Royce da 5'9")	3:22
8.	"Drunken Nights" (featuring Reks, Joe Scudda and J.F.K.)	3:12
9.	"Life Is Short" (featuring Consequence)	2:57
10.	"100 Proof (Interlude)" (featuring J.F.K.)	1:05
11.	"The Thrill Is Gone" (featuring Styles P and Talib Kweli)	4:11
12.	"Get Out" (featuring Skyzoo, Big Pooh, Torae and Lee Wilson)	3:47
13.	"Laughin" (featuring Souls of Mischief)	3:40
14.	"The Coast" (featuring Evidence, Fashawn and Kali)	3:37
15.	"Fake Love (Yes Men)" (featuring Reks, Kali, Termanology and Good Brotha)	3:29
16.	"Eighty-Two" (featuring Termanology)	2:23
17.	"Walking Away" (featuring Kali and Novel)	5:02
Total length:		54:57

== Charts ==
Chart (2010)	Peak position
US Heatseekers Albums (Billboard)	37
