= Politics as Usual (album) =

Studio album by Termanology
- Released: September 30, 2008
- Recorded: 2006–2008
- Genre: Hip-hop
- Length: 45:31
- Label: Nature Sounds
- Producer: Alchemist; Buckwild; DJ Premier; Easy Mo Bee; Havoc; Hi-Tek; Large Professor; Nottz; Pete Rock

Termanology chronology
Out the Gate (2006)	Politics as Usual (2008)	1982 (2010)

Professional ratings
Review scores
Source	Rating
AllHipHop	8/10 stars
Boston Phoenix	4/4 stars
HipHopDX	3.5/5
RapReviews	7.5/10
Spin	(Note: In December 2008 issue of Spin magazine, it was revealed that the review of Termanology's Politics as Usual was incorrectly attributed to Mosi Reeves, instead of Will Dukes. However, the Spin website kept Reeves as the review contributor.)

Politics as Usual is the debut solo studio album by American rapper Termanology. It was released on September 30, 2008 via Nature Sounds. Produced by DJ Premier, Hi-Tek, Alchemist, Buckwild, Easy Mo Bee, Havoc, Large Professor, Nottz and Pete Rock, it features guest appearances from Bun B, Freeway, Lil' Fame, Prodigy and Sheek Louch. The album debuted at number 37 on the Heatseekers Albums chart in the United States. A music video for "How We Rock" was released in early 2009.

== Track listing ==
No.	Title	Producer(s)	Length
1.	"It's Time"	Easy Mo Bee	0:52
2.	"Watch How It Go Down"	DJ Premier	4:00
3.	"Respect My Walk"	Buckwild	3:03
4.	"Hood Shit" (featuring Prodigy)	Alchemist	3:55
5.	"Float"	Nottz	3:15
6.	"Please Don't Go"	Nottz	4:27
7.	"How We Rock" (featuring Bun B)	DJ Premier	3:57
8.	"Drugs, Crime & Gorillaz" (featuring Sheek Louch and Freeway)	Nottz	3:51
9.	"In the Streets" (featuring Lil' Fame)	Hi-Tek	3:53
10.	"So Amazing"	DJ Premier	3:52
11.	"Sorry I Lied to You"	Large Professor	3:03
12.	"We Killin' Ourselves"	Pete Rock	3:58
13.	"The Chosen"	Havoc	3:25
Total length:			45:31

== Charts ==
Chart (2008)	Peak position
US Heatseekers Albums (Billboard)	37
