= 2012 (1982 album) =

Studio album by 1982 (Statik Selektah and Termanology)
- Released: May 22, 2012
- Recorded: 2011–2012
- Studio: The Showoff Basement (Brooklyn, NY)
- Genre: Hip-hop
- Length: 50:45
- Label: ST.; ShowOff; Brick
- Producer: Statik Selektah

1982 (Statik Selektah and Termanology) chronology
1982 (2010)	2012 (2012)	Still 1982 (2018)

Statik Selektah chronology
Well-Done (2011)	2012 (2012)	Stereo Type! (2012)

Termanology chronology
50 Bodies 4 (2012)	2012 (2012)	Fizzyology (2012)

Professional ratings
Review scores
Source	Rating
AllHipHop	7.5/10
HipHopDX	4/5
RapReviews	8.5/10
XXL	L (3/5)

2012 is the second collaborative studio album by American hip-hop duo 1982, composed of record producer Statik Selektah and rapper Termanology. It was released on May 22, 2012, via ShowOff/Brick Records. Recording sessions took place at the Showoff Basement in Brooklyn. Produced by Statik Selektah, it features guest appearances from Bun B, Crooked I, Freddie Gibbs, Havoc, Lil' Fame, Mac Miller, Roc Marciano and Shawn Stockman, as well as contributions from Sheila B., Anjuli Stars, Ea$y Money, Liza Colby, Muzik Jones Drew and Reks.

== Track listing ==
No.	Title	Length
1.	"2012"	2:35
2.	"Lights Down"	3:16
3.	"Up Every Night"	2:53
4.	"Shining"	4:32
5.	"Happy Days" (featuring Mac Miller, Bun B and Shawn Stockman)	4:44
6.	"Too Long"	4:24
7.	"Time Travellin'"	3:31
8.	"82 Was the Year" (Interlude)	0:28
9.	"Thug Poets" (featuring Roc Marciano and Havoc)	3:59
10.	"Right Now"	2:25
11.	"Everything"	3:22
12.	"Hard to Forget"	4:18
13.	"Make It Out Alive" (featuring Freddie Gibbs and Crooked I)	3:17
14.	"Live It Up" (featuring Lil' Fame)	3:54
15.	"Time Ticking"	3:07
Total length:		50:45

== Personnel ==
- Daniel "Termanology" Carrillo – vocals, executive producer
- Liza Colby – additional vocals (track 3)
- Sheila B. – additional vocals (tracks: 4, 7)
- Corey "Reks" Christie – additional vocals (track 4)
- Malcolm "Mac Miller" McCormick – vocals (track 5)
- Bernard "Bun B" Freeman – vocals (track 5)
- Shawn Stockman – vocals (track 5)
- Ed "Ea$y Money" Rivera – additional vocals (track 6)
- Rakeem "Roc Marciano" Myer – vocals (track 9)
- Kejuan "Havoc" Muchita – vocals (track 9)
- Muzik Jones Drew – additional vocals (track 11)
- Frederick "Freddie Gibbs" Tipton – vocals (track 13)
- Dominick "Crooked I" Wickliffe – vocals (track 13)
- Jamal "Lil' Fame" Grinnage – vocals (track 14)
- Anjuli Stars – additional vocals (track 14)
- Patrick "Statik Selektah" Baril – producer, mixing, executive producer
- Trevor "Karma" Gendron – executive producer
- Adam "Papa D!" Defalco – executive producer
- Evan Iskovitz – photography
