= Out the Gate (album) =

Studio album by Termanology
- Released: January 31, 2006
- Recorded: 2005–06
- Genre: Hip-hop
- Length: 73:01
- Label: ST Records
- Producer: DC the Midi Alien

Termanology chronology
Hood Politics III: Unsigned Hype (2005)	Out the Gate (2006)	Hood Politics IV: Show And Prove (2006)

Out the Gate is a collaborative album by rapper Termanology and producer DC the Midi Alien.

== Track listing ==
No.	Title	Producer	Length
1.	"Statik Selektah Intro"	DC the Midi Alien	1:01
2.	"This is Hip-Hop"	DC the Midi Alien	4:07
3.	"Motion Picture"	DC the Midi Alien	3:42
4.	"22 Years"	DC the Midi Alien	4:33
5.	"Welcome 2 the Hood" (featuring Krumbsnatcha and Hectic of ST)	DC the Midi Alien	4:41
6.	"Out the Gate" (featuring ST Da Squad)	DC the Midi Alien	3:36
7.	"Brotherly Love" (featuring Easy Money (Ed Rock) of ST and Snuk of ST)	DC the Midi Alien	4:01
8.	"Circle of Life" (featuring Lee Wilson)	DC the Midi Alien	5:22
9.	"When We Were Kids" (featuring Akrobatik and Jordan)	DC the Midi Alien	2:37
10.	"Baby" (featuring Lee Wilson)	DC the Midi Alien	3:45
11.	"My Life" (featuring L Da Headtoucha)	DC the Midi Alien	4:33
12.	"Ain't Gotta Be Rich To Ball" (featuring Shells and Snuk of ST)	DC the Midi Alien	4:37
13.	"Mommy, Daddy, Grandma"	DC the Midi Alien	4:16
14.	"Never Be the Same" (featuring Easy Money (Ed Rock) of ST, Snuk of ST, and Checkmark)	DC the Midi Alien	4:26
15.	"Takin’ You With Me"	DC the Midi Alien	1:52
16.	"Ain’t Fuckin’ With Me" (featuring Prospect)	DC the Midi Alien	2:45
17.	"Ready" (featuring Esoteric and Guttamouf)	DC the Midi Alien	3:54
18.	"P-N-C Outro"	DC the Midi Alien	4:40
19.	"The Anthem"	DC the Midi Alien	3:58
