= 8 (Statik Selektah album) =

Studio album by Statik Selektah
- Released: December 8, 2017
- Recorded: 2017
- Genre: Hip-hop
- Length: 60:37
- Label: Showoff Records; Duck Down
- Producer: Statik Selektah; The Alchemist

Statik Selektah chronology
Lucky 7 (2015)	8 (2017)

Singles from 8
- 1. "Man of the Hour" Released: July 7, 2017; 2. "But You Don't Hear Me Tho" Released: September 8, 2017; 3. "Put Jewels On It" Released: November 2, 2017; 4. "No. 8" Released: November 15, 2017

8 is the eighth studio album by hip-hop record producer Statik Selektah. The album was released on December 8, 2017, by Duck Down Music Inc. and Showoff Records. The album features guest appearances from vocal artists, such as 2 Chainz, Action Bronson, Joey Badass, Termanology, Run The Jewels, The L.O.X., Wale, Royce da 5'9", Joyner Lucas, Raekwon, Mtume, Westside Gunn, Conway the Machine, Sean Price and G-Eazy.

External videos
- Statik Selektah "No. 8" feat. Conway, Westside Gunn & Termanology (Official Music Video) (November 15, 2017)
- Statik Selektah "But You Don't Hear Me Tho" feat. The LOX & Mtume (Official Music Video) (December 8, 2017)

== Track listing ==
All tracks produced by Statik Selektah except track 17, co-produced by The Alchemist.

No.	Title	Writer(s)	Length
1.	"Harley's Blues (The World Could Save)" (featuring Harley Harl & Francesca)	Patrick Baril	1:37
2.	"Man of the Hour" (featuring 2 Chainz & Wiz Khalifa)	Baril; Tauheed Epps; Cameron Thomaz; Utril Rhaburn; Brady Watt; Caswell Weinbren	3:04
3.	"Put Jewels On It" (featuring Run the Jewels)	Baril; Jaime Meline; Michael Render	2:34
4.	"Watching Myself" (featuring Action Bronson)	Baril; Arian Asllani	2:40
5.	"Get Down" (featuring Wale & Phil Ade)	Baril; Olubowale Akintimehin; Philip Adetumbi; Watt	2:40
6.	"Ain't a Damn Thing Change" (featuring G-Eazy, Joey Badass & Enisa)	Baril; Gerald Gillum; Jo-Vaughn Scott; Enisa Nikovic; Watt; Rhaburn; Weinbren	3:12
7.	"But You Don't Hear Me Tho" (featuring The Lox & Mtume)	Baril; Sean Jacobs; David Styles; Jason Phillips	3:59
8.	"No. 8" (featuring Conway, Westside Gunn & Termanology)	Baril; Demond Price; Alvin Worthy; Daniel Carrillo; Watt; Rhaburn	3:42
9.	"What Can We Do (Parts 1 & 2)" (featuring ANoyd, Crimeapple, Avenue, Nick Grant, Millyz & Chris Rivers)	Baril; Dasher Whitehead; Sebastian Vasco; Avenue; Nick Grant; Miles Lockwood; Christopher Rios, Jr.; Rhaburn	6:37
10.	"Don't Run" (featuring Joyner Lucas)	Baril; Gary Lucas; Matthew Crabtree	4:32
11.	"Go Gettas" (featuring Wais P, Sean Price & Tek)	Baril; Malcolm Byers; Sean Price; Tekomin Williams; Watt; Rhaburn	3:47
12.	"Slept to Death" (featuring Curren$y & Cousin Stizz)	Baril; Shante Franklin; Stephen Goss; Rhaburn	3:09
13.	"Everything (Show Me Love)" (featuring PnB Rock & Lil Fame)	Baril; Rakim Allen; Jamal Grinnage	3:03
14.	"Nobody Move" (featuring Raekwon & Royce da 5'9")	Baril; Corey Woods; Ryan Montgomery; Rhaburn; Crabtree	3:31
15.	"Shakem Up" (featuring B-Real & Everlast)	Baril; Louis Freese; Erik Schrody; Weinbren	2:26
16.	"Pull the Curtain Back" (featuring No Malice)	Baril; Gene Thornton, Jr.	1:47
17.	"Disrespekt" (featuring Prodigy)	Baril; Albert Johnson; Alan Maman	2:17
18.	"All Said & Done /// (JFK's 8 Ball Outro)" (featuring Plays & Juelz Santana)	Baril; Plays; LaRon James; Randy Baldassari; Susan Neems	6:00
Total length:			60:37

== Charts ==
Chart performance for 8
Chart (2017)	Peak position
US Independent Albums (Billboard)	44
US Heatseekers Albums (Billboard)	4
