= Extended Play (Statik Selektah album) =

Studio album by Statik Selektah
- Released: June 18, 2013
- Recorded: 2012–2013
- Genre: Hip-hop
- Length: 62:53
- Labels: Showoff; Duck Down
- Producers: Statik Selektah, The Alchemist

Statik Selektah chronology
Population Control (2011)	Extended Play (2013)	What Goes Around (2014)

Singles from Extended Play
- 1. "Bird's Eye View" Released: April 16, 2013; 2. "21 & Over" Released: May 14, 2013; 3. "Game Break" Released: June 4, 2013

Extended Play is the fifth studio album by East Coast hip-hop producer Statik Selektah. The album was released on June 18, 2013, by Duck Down Music and Showoff Records. The album features guest appearances from Action Bronson, Tony Touch, Raekwon, Joey Badass, Black Thought, N.O.R.E., Sean Price, Mac Miller, Mike Posner, Freddie Gibbs, Prodigy, Styles P, Bun B, Hit-Boy, Joell Ortiz, Evidence, Lecrae, Talib Kweli, and Flatbush Zombies among others.

== Singles ==
The first single "Bird's Eye View" featuring Raekwon, Joey Badass and Black Thought was released on April 16, 2013. The second single "21 & Over" featuring Mac Miller and Sean Price was released on May 14, 2013. On June 5, 2013, the music video was released for "21 & Over" featuring Mac Miller and Sean Price. The third single "Game Break" featuring Lecrae, Termanology and Posdnuos was released on June 4, 2013. On September 28, 2013, the music video was released for "Gz, Pimps, Hustlers" featuring Wais P.

== Critical response ==
Professional ratings
Review scores
Source	Rating
AllMusic	4/5 stars
AllHipHop	7/10
DJBooth	4/5 stars
Exclaim!	8/10
HipHopDX	4/5 stars
RapReviews	7.5/10

Extended Play received positive reviews from music critics. At Metacritic, which assigns a weighted mean rating out of 100 to reviews from mainstream critics, the album received an average score of 83, based on 5 reviews, which indicates "universal acclaim". Jason Lymangrover of AllMusic said, "Turntable scratching and a glaring lack of digital manipulation make this feel more like a throwback, but despite the fact that this is the fifth album completed in six years, Statik Selektah's Extended Play doesn't seem sloppily thrown together. Instead, it's a dense, imaginative outing that pays tribute to classic East Coast hip-hop lovingly." Mark Bozzer of Exclaim! stated, "Extended Play easily warrants repeated listens in the whip. Hands down, the best track is lead single "Bird's Eye View," which has the venerable Raekwon and "top 5 MC of all time" Black Thought spitting knowledge with young gun Joey Bada$$ over Seleketah's shimmering soul. Other tracks that stand out are (believe or not) are "21 & Over," which finds Sean P linking with Mac Miller, and testosterone-fest "Funeral Season," featuring Styles P, Bun B and Hit Boy shitting on everybody in their way. Do yourself a favor and cop this release. Rap is good nowadays, so indulge."

Jay Balfour of HipHopDX said, "Extended Play reads much like Statik's past full-length showcase records—this is the fifth of its kind since 2007—but with 18 tracks and a whopping 38 guests, some of whom make more than one appearance, it's an inherently tiring listen. At just over 60 minutes, the album is too dense to let the feature production breathe much on its own, and the three separate guest verses per song template dominates much of the project. While the album might incite a little listener's fatigue in a single session absorption, it functions well as an inspiringly crowded display case of quality Rap in 2013. Statik's individual partnerships might yield more compelling full-length projects on their own but albums like Extended Play are fine platforms for a little showing off. Matthew Sanderson of AllHipHop stated, "All in all the effort is solid. However, with such a roster of ill MCs, there seems to be some lack luster spitters that should not be on the same track as the others. Almost feels like a little bit of filler. Maybe Statik is trying to shed some limelight to his buddies and I cannot be against that. However, for example, I rather have had extra bars from both the Ghost and Bun on Funeral session, if you get my drift. The beats are there, the greats are on there too. Why not have the All Stars rap the whole piece and X out the gold string?" Steve 'Flash' Juon of RapReviews gave the album a 7.5 out of 10, saying "Extended Play has the comfortable feel of a mid-to-late 1990s DJ Premier P-P-P-Premier mixtape though so I'm not mad at it - I just want Statik to knock his next one out of the stratosphere."

== Commercial performance ==
The album debuted at number 121 on the Billboard 200 chart, with first-week sales of 3,600 copies in the United States.

== Track listing ==
- All tracks produced by Statik Selektah except track 16, co-produced by The Alchemist.

No.	Title	Length
1.	"Reloaded" (featuring Pain In Da Ass, Action Bronson, Big Body Bes, Termanology & Tony Touch)	2:02
2.	"Bird's Eye View" (featuring Raekwon, Joey Badass & Black Thought)	3:34
3.	"East Coast" (featuring N.O.R.E. & Lil Fame)	2:47
4.	"21 & Over" (featuring Sean Price & Mac Miller)	2:47
5.	"The Spark" (featuring Action Bronson, Joey Badass & Mike Posner)	2:56
6.	"Make Believe" (featuring Freddie Gibbs, Easy Money & Termanology)	4:01
7.	"Pinky Ring" (featuring Prodigy)	2:52
8.	"Funeral Season" (featuring Styles P, Bun B & Hit-Boy)	4:00
9.	"Bring 'Em Up Dead" (featuring Joell Ortiz)	3:36
10.	"Camouflage Dons" (featuring Smif-n-Wessun & Flatbush Zombies)	2:53
11.	"Big City of Dreams" (featuring Troy Ave, Push!, Meyhem Lauren & AG Da Coroner)	4:21
12.	"Gz, Pimps, Hustlers" (featuring Wais P & Slaine)	4:34
13.	"My Hoe" (featuring Blu, Evidence & Reks)	3:51
14.	"Love & War" (featuring Easy Money & Freeway)	3:26
15.	"100 Stacks" (featuring JFK & Strong Arm Steady)	2:36
16.	"Live from the Era" (featuring Pro Era)	5:18
17.	"Game Break" (featuring Lecrae, Termanology & Posdnuos)	4:22
18.	"Home" (featuring Talib Kweli)	2:57
Total length:		62:53

== Personnel ==
Credits for Extended Play adapted from AllMusic.

Managerial

- Statik Selektah – executive producer
- Alvin Akinti – promoter
- Guy Belloch – marketing
- Matt Blakely – marketing
- Buckshot – associate executive producer
- Matt Conaway – publicity
- DJ Sherazta – marketing
- Dru-Ha – associate executive producer
- Eli Evnen – marketing
- Noah Friedman – project coordinator
- Shane Gill – marketing
- JFK – executive producer
- Bram Van Leuken – marketing
- Brandon "Bedlam" Matthews – marketing
- Mazza – marketing
- Kenneth Montgomery – legal counsel
- J. Nicholson – promoter
- Reuben Rodriguez-Robbins – marketing
- Shucky Ducky – marketing
- Lou Smith – promoter

Visuals and imagery

- Deezy – creative director
- Dom Dirtee – photography

Performance credits

- Statik Selektah – primary artist
- Pain In Da Ass – featured artist
- Action Bronson – featured artist
- Big Body Bes – featured artist
- Termanology – featured artist
- Tony Touch – featured artist
- Raekwon – featured artist
- Joey Badass – featured artist
- Black Thought – featured artist
- N.O.R.E. – featured artist
- Lil Fame – featured artist
- Sean Price – featured artist
- Mac Miller – featured artist
- Mike Posner – featured artist
- Freddie Gibbs – featured artist
- Easy Money – featured artist
- Prodigy – featured artist
- Styles P – featured artist
- Bun B – featured artist
- Hit-Boy – featured artist
- Joell Ortiz – featured artist
- Smif-n-Wessun – featured artist
- Flatbush Zombies – featured artist
- Troy Ave – featured artist
- Push! – featured artist
- Meyhem Lauren – featured artist
- AG Da Coroner – featured artist
- Wais P – featured artist
- Slaine – featured artist
- Blu – featured artist
- Evidence – featured artist
- Reks – featured artist
- Freeway – featured artist
- JFK – featured artist
- Strong Arm Steady – featured artist
- Pro Era – featured artist
- Lecrae – featured artist
- Posdnuos – featured artist
- Talib Kweli – featured artist

Technical and production

- Statik Selektah – producer
- The Alchemist – producer

== Charts ==
Chart (2013)	Peak position
US Billboard 200	121
US Top Current Album Sales (Billboard)	108
US Heatseekers Albums (Billboard)	3
US Top R&B/Hip-Hop Albums (Billboard)	18
US Independent Albums (Billboard)	27
