= Perfect Gentlemen =

American contemporary R&B group

- Origin: Boston, Massachusetts, United States
- Genres: R&B, hip hop, new jack swing
- Years active: 1988–1993
- Labels: Columbia Records; Warner Bros. Records
- Past members: Corey Blakely; Maurice Starr Jr. Miles 'Masspike' Wheeler; Stephen Reeves; Tyrone Sutton

Perfect Gentlemen were an American trio of teen R&B vocalists formed under the direction of Maurice Starr, who discovered New Edition and New Kids on the Block.

Starr put the group together in Boston in 1988, and had them tour the US opening for New Kids on the Block. An album and a video followed, and the group scored a hit single with "Ooh La La (I Can't Get over You)" (1990), which peaked at No. 10 on the Billboard Hot 100 and No. 12 on the R&B/Hip Hop charts.

== Members ==
- Corey Blakely
- Maurice Starr Jr.
- Tyrone Sutton (on Rated PG)
- Miles "Masspike Miles" Wheeler (on The Perfect Gentlemen)
- Stephen Reeves (on The Perfect Gentlemen)

== Discography ==
- Rated PG (Columbia Records, 1990) U.S. Billboard Top 200 peak No. 72, U.S. R&B peak No. 39
- The Perfect Gentlemen (Warner Bros. Records, 1993)
