= Reks =

American rapper (born 1977)

- Born: Corey Christie; August 24, 1977 (age 48); Lawrence, Massachusetts, U.S.
- Genres: Hip hop
- Years active: 1999–present
- Labels: ShowOff, Brick Records

Corey Isiah Christie (born August 24, 1977), better known by his stage name Reks (styled in all caps as REKS), is an American rapper. Reks emerged from Lawrence, Massachusetts' underground rap scene. His debut underground album, Along Came The Chosen, was released on Brick Records in 2001. Reks has released eight additional albums and has appeared on various albums and mixtapes.

== Early career ==
Reks was a breakdancer in his teens and was part of a local B-boy crew called Funk Town Connection. By the time he entered college at University of Massachusetts Amherst, Reks had built a reputation for himself in the local Boston rap scene, and eventually quit school to begin recording for Brick Records. A few 12" singles, "I Could Have Done More" and "Fearless," arrived first in early 2001, before Brick issued his debut LP, Along Came the Chosen, later that year. This earned Reks nominations for Hip-Hop Album and Artist of the Year by the Boston Music Awards. Reks worked with DJ Premier, Styles P, Alchemist, Hi-Tek, and many others on his 2011 album Rhythmatic Eternal King Supreme. On October 14, 2016 he released the critically acclaimed album "The Greatest X"

== Discography ==
=== Albums ===
- 2001: Along Came the Chosen
- 2003: Rekless
- 2005: Happy Holidays
- 2008: Grey Hairs
- 2009: More Grey Hairs
- 2011: Rhythmatic Eternal King Supreme
- 2012: Straight, No Chaser
- 2012: REBELutionary
- 2013: Revolution Cocktail
- 2014: Eyes Watching God
- 2016: The Greatest X
- 2018: Order In Chaos
- 2020: T.H.I.N.G.S. (The Hunger Inside Never Gets Satisfied)

=== EPs ===
- Skills 101 / Science of Life / Final Four (Brick Records 2000)
- DJ Shame / Dead Prez / Reks & Virtuoso – No More Re-Mixes Vol 1: Behind Enemy Lines / The Setup (Raptivism 2000)
- I Could Have Done More / In Who We Trust / Healthy Habitat (Raptivism 2000)
- Fearless/ Skills 201 / My City (Brick Records 2001)
- Easy / Easy (remix) / Beantown to Cali (Brick Records 2001)
- Soul Supreme /Reks – Queen (Hip-Hop)/Still Searchin (Grit 2002)
- Say Goodnight / Big Dreamers (Lawtown Remix) (Showoff Records/Brick Records 2008)

=== Guest appearances ===
- "Rare Form" with Hex One, 5th Element, MindsOne, Tek-nition & Ty-One on Hologramz (2014)
- "Drunk & High" with Termanology & N.O.R.E. on Cameo King III
- "Way It Goes" with Mr. Green & Lucky Dice (2017, single)
- "Red or Blue Pill" with Rec Riddles on Brilliant but Disturbed (2016)
- "C.T.D." with Finnish rap duo JXO (2018)
- "Daddy's Guitar" with TooBusy on Red Tape (2020)
- "Written in Stone (feat. Suave-Ski)" with Fuzzy Ed on Mythology (2022)
- "Longevity (feat. Edo. G)" with V Knuckles on The Next Chapter (2023)

=== Mixtapes ===
- 2010: In Between the Lines
- 2011: In Between the Lines 2
- 2014: All Eyes on Reks

== Awards ==
- 2011 Best Indie Album [UMA]

=== Nominations ===
- Album of the Year 2011 (Boston Music Awards)
- Hip Hop Artist of the Year 2011 (Boston Music Awards)
- The UMA Male Artist of the Year 2011
- Indie Album of the Year 2011
