= Statik Selektah production discography =

The following list contains songs produced, co-produced or remixed by Hip hop producer Statik Selektah

== 2001 ==
=== Reks – Along Came The Chosen ===
- 14. "Work" (feat. Lucky Dice, B. Knox, & Rip Shop)

== 2004 ==
=== KRS-One – Keep Right ===
- 23. "The Cutclusion"

=== Krumbsnatcha – Let The Truth Be Told ===
- 01. "Statik Selektah Intro"

=== Statik Selektah & Nas – The Prophecy ===
- 03. "Wiseguys" (feat. Styles P)
- 24. "You Know My Style (Showoff Remix)"

== 2005 ==
=== O.C. – Starchild ===
- 01. "Intro"
- 13. "Outro"

== 2006 ==
=== G-Unit – The Empire Strikes Back ===
- 03. "The Grind" (50 Cent featuring The Notorious B.I.G.)
- 04. "Who Dat" (M.O.P. & Young Buck)
- 05. "Every Time" (Statik Selektah featuring Mobb Deep & Termanology)
- 06. "I Can't Wait (Have A Party Pt. 2)" (Mobb Deep featuring 50 Cent)
- 12. "50 This, 50 That" (50 Cent featuring M.O.P.)
- 14. "We Killin' Em (Young Buck)
- 20. "Curious (Remix) – Live from the Bahamas" (Tony Yayo)

=== Termanology – Hood Politics IV: Show And Prove ===
- 06. "Think It Over" (feat. Trife Da God)
- 12. "Everytime" (feat. Mobb Deep)
- 22. "Watch Your Back" (feat. Royce Da 5'9" & Ea$y Money)

=== AZ – The Format ===
- 07. "Animal"

=== Statik Selektah & Nas – The Prophecy Vol. 2 (The Beginning Of The N) ===
- 01. "Statik Selektah & Nas Intro"
- 02. "Don't Hate Me Now (The N Remix)"
- 12. "Life's Gone Down"

== 2007 ==
=== Foxy Brown – Brooklyn's Don Diva ===
- 07. "Too Real" (feat. AZ)

=== Termanology – Hood Politics V ===
- 19. "Hardcore" (feat. Reks)

=== Statik Selektah – Spell My Name Right: The Album ===
- 01. "Spell My Name Right (Intro)" (feat. DJ Premier & Termanology)
- 02. "Stop, Look, Listen" (feat. Styles P, Termanology, & Q-Tip)
- 03. "Express Yourself '08" (feat. Termanology, Talib Kweli, & Consequence)
- 04. "6 In The Morning" (feat. Joell Ortiz, Kool G Rap, & Sheek Louch)
- 05. "What Would You Do!?" (feat. Freeway & Cassidy)
- 06. "Make A Movie (Interlude)" (feat. DJ Khaled)
- 07. "Bam Bam" (feat. Red Cafe, Termanology, & Murs)
- 08. "G-Shit (Showoff Mix)" (feat. Uncle Murda, Sev-One, Termanology, & Jadakiss)
- 09. "Back Against The Wall" (feat. Royce Da 5'9" & Cormega)
- 10. "Hardcore (So You Wanna Be)" (feat. Reks & Termanology)
- 11. "No Mistakes Allowed" (feat. Doug E. Fresh, Tony Touch, Scram Jones, Dp-One, DJ Gi-Joe, DJ Revolution, & Esoteric)
- 12. "Knockin' Em Out (Interlude)" (feat. Clinton Sparks)
- 13. "Punch Out" (feat. Big Shug)
- 14. "The Good Life (Give It Up) (feat. Lil' Fame)
- 15. "Big Dreamers" (feat. Reks)
- 16. "No Holding Back" (feat. AZ & Cormega)
- 17. "Got Me Goin' (Hip Hop)" (feat. Slum Village & Granite State)
- 18. "Time To Say Goodbye" (feat. Evidence & The Alchemist)
- 19. "It's Over Now" (feat. Termanology & A.G.)
- 20. "Talk To Me" (feat. Jon Hope, Reks, & Skyzoo)
- 21. "Did What We Had To Do (Showoff Mix)" (feat. KRS-One, Larry Cheeba & Large Professor)

== 2008 ==
=== ST. da Squad – ST. da Squad ===
- 02. "It's The ST."

=== Reks – Grey Hairs ===
- 02. "The One"
- 04. "How Can It Be"
- 09. "Black Cream (The Negro Epidemic)" (feat. Big Shug)
- 10. "Love Sweet Misery"
- 11. "Rise"
- 12. "Telescope" (feat. Jon Hope & Lucky Dice)
- 13. "Day 2"
- 14. "Premonition" (feat. Termanology & Consequence)
- 16. "Cry Baby"
- 18. "Big Dreamers (Lawtown Remix)" (feat. Krumbsnatcha & Termanology)
- 20. "Pray For Me"

=== Statik Selektah – Stick 2 the Script ===
- 01. "Stick 2 The Script (Intro)"
- 02. "To The Top (Stick 2 The Script)" (feat. Cassidy, Saigon, & Termanology)
- 03. "For the City" (feat. M.O.P. & Jadakiss
- 04. "Get Out the Way" (feat. Bun B & Cory Mo)
- 05. "All 2gether Now" (feat. Freeway, Peedi Crakk, & Young Chris)
- 06. "Interlude" (feat. Q-Tip)
- 07. "Church" (feat. Termanology)
- 08. "Talkin Bout You (Ladies)" (feat. Skyzoo, Joell Ortiz & Talib Kweli)
- 09. "On the Marquee" (feat. Little Brother, Joe Scudda, & Chaundon)
- 10. "Mr. Popularity" (feat. Consequence)
- 11. "Interlude" (feat. Mad Rapper)
- 12. "This Is It (Showoff Remix)" (feat. Black Rob, D-Dot, & Redman)
- 13. "So Good (Live From The Bar)" (feat. Naledge, Reks & CL Smooth)
- 14. "Streets of M.A." (feat. Masspike Miles, Termanology, SuperSTah Snuk, Slaine, Ea$y Money, Frankie Wainwright, & Smoke Bulga)
- 15. "Sounds of the Street (Interlude)" (feat. JFK)
- 16. "Destined to Shine" (feat. Torae, Jon Hope, & Sha Stimuli)
- 17. "Cali Nights" (feat. Glasses Malone, Mistah F.A.B., & Novel)
- 18. "Take It All Back" (feat. Reks, Ea$y Money, Royce Da 5'9", & Paula Campbell)

== 2009 ==
=== Reks – More Grey Hairs ===
- 02. "Play My Music"
- 04. "Stereotypes" (co-produced by 1914)
- 05. "Killaz on Wax"
- 07. "Year Of The Showoff"
- 11. "Why Do We Say Goodbye"

=== Various Artists – Midnight Club: Los Angeles South Central – The South Central EP ===
- 02. "Rollin' Down The Freeway" (Statik Selektah feat. Glasses Malone, Kali, & Termanology)

=== Saigon & Statik Selektah – All In A Day's Work ===
- 01. "To Be Told..."
- 02. "So Cruel"
- 03. "The Rules"
- 04. "My Crew"
- 05. "Prepare for War"
- 06. "Spit"
- 07. "Lady Sings the Blues"
- 08. "Lose Her"
- 09. "Goodbye"
- 10. "The Reason"
- 11. "I Warned You"

=== Krumbsnatcha – Hidden Scriptures ===
- 09. "Hidden Scriptures"

=== M.O.P. – Foundation ===
- 06. "Crazy" (feat. Termanology)
- 08. "Forever & Always"

=== Termanology – Hood Politics VI: Time Machine ===
- 01. "Nobody's Smilin'"
- 09. "It's A Shame" (feat. Joell Ortiz)

=== O.C. & A.G. – Oasis ===
- 01. "Oasis"

=== Statik Selektah – Grand Theft Auto IV: The Lost & Damned EP (Special Edition) ===
- 01. "Here In Liberty City" (feat. Termanology)
- 02. "My Favorite Song (Talib Kweli & Reks Remix)" (feat. Talib Kweli & Reks)
- 05. "I Hear Footsteps" (feat. Consequence)
- 06. "The Chase Is On" (feat. Skyzoo)
- 07. "Destined to Shine (Obama Remix)" (feat. Torae, Jon Hope, & Sha Stimuli)

=== Ghetto – Trunk Music ===
- 11. "Star Of Da Show"

=== Statik Selektah – The Pre-Game EP ===
- 01. "The Best" (feat. Reks, Termanology, JFK, & Kali)
- 02. "Different Day, Same Shit" (feat. JFK, Sha Stimuli, & Skyzoo)
- 03. "Jaded" (feat. Joe Scudda, Truck North, & Diz Gibran)
- 04. "Other Than That" (feat. NYG'z)
- 05. "I'm Wit It (Showoff Remix)" (feat. Talib Kweli & Cory Mo)
- 06. "Do What I Believe" (feat. Bahamadia)
- 07. "Dear Mike (Interlude)"
- 08. "Addicted 2 The Rhythm" (feat. Jon Hope & Novel)
- 09. "The Facts of Life" (feat. F.T.)

=== Ape & Undo – Jaw & Order ===
- 05. "Primetime" (feat. Statik Selektah)

== 2010 ==
=== Mod Sun – The Hippy Hop EP ===
- 02. "The Other Side"

=== Bun B ===
- 00. "Best In The World"

=== Statik Selektah – 100 Proof: The Hangover ===
- 01. "Inside A Change (Intro)"
- 02. "So Close, So Far" (feat. Bun B, Wale, & Colin Munroe)
- 03. "Critically Acclaimed" (feat. Lil' Fame, Saigon, & Sean Price)
- 04. "Night People" (feat. Freeway, Red Cafe, & Masspike Miles)
- 05. "Follow Me" (feat. Smif-n-Wessun)
- 06. "Do It 2 Death" (feat. Lil' Fame, Havoc, & Kool G Rap)
- 07. "Come Around" (feat. Termanology & Royce Da 5'9")
- 08. "Drunken Nights" (feat. Reks, Joe Scudda, & JFK)
- 09. "Life Is Short" (feat. Consequence)
- 10. "100 Proof (Interlude)" (feat. JFK)
- 11. "The Thrill Is Gone" (feat. Styles P & Talib Kweli)
- 12. "Get Out" (feat. Skyzoo, Big Pooh, Torae, & Lee Wilson)
- 13. "Laughin'" (feat. Souls of Mischief)
- 14. "The Coast" (feat. Evidence, Fashawn, & Kali)
- 15. "Fake Love (Yes Men)" (feat. Reks, Kali, Termanology, & Good Brotha)
- 16. "Eighty-Two" (feat. Termanology)
- 17. "Walking Away" (feat. Kali & Novel)

=== Styles P & DJ Green Lantern – The Green Ghost Project ===
- 11. "Shadows"

=== Joe Scudda – Not Your Average Joe ===
- 00. "Catch Up"

=== Consequence – Movies On Demand ===
- 04. "Sounds G.O.O.D. 2 Me"

=== Boaz – Selling A Dream ===
- 00. "What You Know About"

=== Danny Goines ===
- 00. "My Window"

=== Jared Evan ===
- 00. "Not Tonight"

=== Blacastan – Blac Sabbath ===
- 03. "The Dice Life"

=== Cyhi the Prynce ===
- 00. "What's My Name"

=== Jon Hope ===
- 00. "Which One"

=== Styles P ===
- 00. "Sellouts"

=== Tek – 24Kt Smoke ===
- 14. "Toast To The Good Life"

=== Sonic ===
- 00. "Money & Power" (feat. Termanology & Reks)

=== Wais P ===
- 00. "Back Bitches" (feat. Sauce Money)

=== Josh Xantus ===
- 00. "I Don't Care"

=== 7L & Esoteric – 1212 ===
- 11. "The Most Rotten"

=== 1982 – 1982 ===
- 01. "The World Renown"
- 02. "People Are Running"
- 03. "Things I Dream" (feat. Lil' Fame)
- 04. "Goin' Back" (feat. Cassidy & Xzibit)
- 05. "The Radio"
- 06. "Wedding Bells" (feat. Jared Evan)
- 07. "You Should Go Home" (feat. Bun B & Masspike Miles)
- 08. "Tell Me Lies" (feat. Styles P)
- 09. "Life Is What You Make It" (feat. Saigon & Freeway)
- 10. "Freedom" (feat. Reks)
- 11. "Still Waiting"
- 12. "The Street Life"
- 13. "Thugathon 2010" (feat. M.O.P.)
- 14. "The Hood Is On Fire" (feat. Inspectah Deck)
- 15. "Born In '82"
- 16. "Help"

=== Statik Selektah – The Left-Overs (of What's To Come...) EP ===
- 01. "No Shame" (feat. Termanology, Ea$y Money, & Wais P)
- 02. "I Believe That's Me" (feat. Steven King, Slaine, Reks, & JFK)
- 03. "Make It Seem Easy" (feat. Jon Connor, Kali, & Sonic)
- 04. "Back On Up" (feat. Strong Arm Steady & Planet Asia)
- 05. "The Ambition" (feat. Bumpy Knuckles)
- 06. "The Concept" (feat. Freeway)
- 07. "Wishing" (feat. Joe Scudda)
- 08. "On The Corner" (feat. Big Twin, Freddie Gibbs, Tri-State, & Planet Asia)
- 09. "17" (feat. JFK & Mac Miller)

=== Slaine – The Devil Never Dies ===
- 08. "The Worst"
- 15. "Settin It Off" (feat. Reks, JFK, Jaysaun, & Steven King)
- 16. "Trail Of Blood"

=== Reks – In Between The Lines Vol. 2 ===
- 07. "Successful Girl" (feat. BK Cyph)
- 10. "Pray For You (The Homicide Note)
- 11. "Egos (Outta Control)" (feat. Strong Arm Steady)
- 18. "Eat Or Starve"
- 19. "6am" (feat. Steven King, Slaine, & JFK)
- 22. "The ETC" (feat. Kali)

=== 1982 – 1982: The EP ===
- 01. "The Lottery"
- 02. "All Night" (feat. Kali)
- 03. "The Darkest Cloud" (feat. Chace Infinite)
- 04. "Weird Science"
- 05. "Put It Down" (feat. Ghetto & Ea$y Money)
- 06. "Never Gonna (Interlude)
- 07. "Word Up"
- 08. "The Dream" (feat. Reks)
- 09. "82-92" (feat. Mac Miller)

=== AZ – Doe or Die: 15th Anniversary ===
- 03. "Gimme Yours (2010)"
- 06. "The Calm"
- 07. "Your World Don't Stop (2010)"

=== Sheek Louch – Donnie G: Don Gorilla ===
- 07. "Nite Falls"

=== Chris Webby – Best In The Burbs ===
- 04. "Runaround Webby"
- 06. "Can't Deny Me"
- 10. "Get Loose"

=== 1982 – The Evening News EP ===
- 01. "Start It Like This"
- 02. "Money Is Reality" (feat. Action Bronson)
- 03. "Chill As Hell"
- 04. "Timothy McVeigh" (feat. Wais P)
- 05. "Assassins" (feat. Kali & Ghetto)
- 07. "Baby Mama" (feat. Josh Xantus)
- 08. "Chasing Diamonds" (feat. Wais P)

== 2011 ==
=== Freeway & Statik Selektah – Statik-Free EP ===
- 01. "Back At It"
- 02. "The Flow"
- 03. "P.A." (feat. Mac Miller)
- 04. "I'm In The Hood" (feat. Reek da Villain)
- 05. "From The Street" (feat. Lil' Fame)
- 06. "And It Don't Quit" (feat. Jakk Frost & Tek)
- 07. "All Kinds Of 'Em" (feat. The Jacka & Husalah)

=== Reks – Rhythmatic Eternal King Supreme ===
- 05. "This or That"
- 10. "Mr. Nobody"
- 14. "Mascara (The Ugly Truth)
- 15. "Like A Star"
- 16. "Self Titled"

=== DJ Deadeye – Substance Abuse ===
- 18. "Girl Interrupted" (feat. Termanology & Skyzoo) (co-produced by DJ Deadeye & Termanology)

=== Freddie Gibbs & Statik Selektah – Lord Giveth, Lord Taketh Away ===
- 01. "Intro" (feat. Slaine)
- 02. "Lord Giveth, Lord Taketh Away"
- 03. "Rap Money" (feat. Daz Dillinger)
- 04. "Affiliated" (feat. Reks & Push! Montana)
- 05. "Wild Style" (feat. Termanology & Fred the Godson)
- 06. "Already" (feat. Trae tha Truth)
- 07. "Keep It Warm for Ya" (feat. Smoke DZA & Chace Infinite)

=== Slaine – State of Grace ===
- 01. "State Of Grace (Intro)"
- 02. "Don't Talk Greezy"
- 03. "Offensive Lines" (feat. Action Bronson & Ill Bill)
- 04. "That's How It Is" (feat. Termanology & Tully Banta-Cain)
- 05. "Trail Of Blood" (OG Beat Version)
- 06. "Tonight" (feat. Cyrus DeShield)
- 07. "Gotta Go" (feat. Kali & D-Stroy)
- 08. "American Way"
- 09. "Run It"
- 10. "Night After Night"
- 11. "Molly" (feat. D-Stroy)
- 12. "Hold Up" (feat. Reks)
- 13. "Concepts" (Freestyle)
- 14. "Shade 45 Freestyle" (feat. Kali & D-Stroy)
- 15. "Mistaken Identity"

=== Slaine – A World with No Skies ===
- 08. "The American Way"
- 10. "Mistaken Identity"

=== Apathy – Honkey Kong ===
- 09. "It's Only Hip Hop"

=== Evidence – Cats & Dogs ===
- 19. "Good Times"

=== Styles P – Master of Ceremonies ===
- 08. "Feelings Gone"

=== Statik Selektah – Population Control ===
- 01. "Population Control" (feat. Sean Price & Termanology)
- 02. "Play the Game" (feat. Big K.R.I.T. & Freddie Gibbs)
- 03. "Groupie Love" (feat. Mac Miller & Josh Xantus)
- 04. "New York, New York" (feat. Styles P, Saigon, & Jared Evan)
- 05. "Sam Jack" (feat. XV, Jon Connor, & The Kid Daytona)
- 06. "Never a Dull Moment" (feat. Action Bronson, Termanology, & Bun B)
- 07. "You're Gone" (feat. Talib Kweli, Colin Munroe, & Lil' Fame)
- 08. "They Don't Know" (feat. Pill & Reks)
- 09. "Down" (feat. Push! Montana & Lep Bogus Boys)
- 10. "Let's Build" (feat. Chace Infinite, JFK, Mitchy Slick & Wais P)
- 11. "Smoke On" (feat. Dom Kennedy & Strong Arm Steady)
- 12. "The High Life" (feat. Kali, Isaac Castor & Chris Webby)
- 13. "Half Moon Part" (feat. Skyzoo, Chuuwee & Tayyib Ali)
- 14. "Black Swan" (feat. Nitty Scott, MC & Rapsody)
- 15. "Harlem Blues" (feat. Smoke DZA)
- 16. "Gold In 3D" (feat. STS & Dosage)
- 17. "Damn Right" (feat. Joell Ortiz & Brother Ali)
- 18. "Live & Let Live" (feat. Lecrae)
- 19. "A DJ Saved My Life" (feat. DJ Premier, DJ Babu, Scram Jones & DJ Caze)
- 20. "4Gs" (feat. Ea$y Money, Termanology, Scram Jones, & Wais P)

=== Statik Selektah & Action Bronson – Well-Done ===
- 01. "Respect the Mustache"
- 02. "Time for Some" (feat. Lil' Fame)
- 03. "Cocoa Butter" (feat. Nina Sky)
- 04. "White Silk"
- 05. "Keep Off The Grass"
- 06. "The Stick-Up"
- 07. "Central Bookings" (feat. Meyhem Lauren)
- 08. "Cirque de Soleil"
- 09. "The Rainmaker"
- 10. "Love Letter"
- 11. "Not Enough Words"
- 12. "Terror Death Camp" (feat. Meyhem Lauren, Maffew Ragazino, & AG Da Coroner)
- 13. "Miss Fordham Road (86 87 88)"
- 14. "Cliff Notes"
- 15. "Bon Voyage"

=== Chris Webby – There Goes The Neighborhood ===
- 09. "Take Me Home"

== 2012 ==
=== Raekwon – Unexpected Victory ===
- 16. "Gangsta Cazas" (feat. JD Era, Camoflauge, & Styles P)

=== Disiz – Lucide ===
- 01. "Toussa, Toussa"

=== Obie Trice – Bottoms Up ===
- 05. "Richard" (feat. Eminem)

=== Sixfeet ===
- 00. "Alternativ Dogma" (feat. Big P)

=== Reks – Straight, No Chaser ===
- 01. "Autographs"
- 02. "Sit/Think/Drink"
- 03. "Power Lines" (feat. Ea$y Money)
- 04. "Riggs & Murtaugh" (feat. Action Bronson)
- 05. "Such a Showoff" (feat. Kali, JFK, & Termanology)
- 06. "Cancel That" (feat. Wais P)
- 07. "Parenthood"
- 08. "Break Ups" (feat. C-Sharp)
- 09. "Chasin'"
- 10. "Sins" (feat. Alias)
- 11. "Straight, No Chaser" (feat. Slaine)
- 12. "Lost In Translation"
- 13. "Regrets"
- 14. "730"

=== 1982 – 2012 ===
- 01. "2012"
- 02. "Lights Down"
- 03. "Up Every Night"
- 04. "Shining"
- 05. "Happy Days" (feat. Mac Miller, Bun B, & Shawn Stockman)
- 06. "Too Long"
- 07. "Time Travellin'"
- 08. "82 Was The Year (Interlude)"
- 09. "Thug Poets" (feat. Roc Marciano & Havoc)
- 10. "Right Now"
- 11. "Everything"
- 12. "Hard To Forget"
- 13. "Make It Out Alive" (feat. Freddie Gibbs & Crooked I)
- 14. "Live It Up" (feat. Lil' Fame)
- 15. "Time Ticking"

=== Joey Badass – 1999 ===
- 12. "Don't Front" (feat. CJ Fly)

=== La Coka Nostra – Masters of the Dark Arts ===
- 01. "My Universe" (feat. Vinnie Paz)

=== Strong Arm Steady & Statik Selektah – Stereotype ===
- 01. "Truth of The Truth"
- 02. "Premium"
- 03. "Forever" (feat. Chace Infinite)
- 04. "Born Into It" (feat. Bad Lucc)
- 05. "Do Ya Thang Girl (JOOK)" (feat. Casey Veggies & Picaso)
- 06. "On My Job" (feat. Skeme)
- 07. "LA Blues" (feat. Planet Asia & Tri-State)
- 08. "Classic"
- 09. "Through The Motions" (feat. David Banner & Fiend)
- 10. "Married To The Game" (feat. Chace Infinite & Double R)
- 11. "Fair Fight" (feat. Ab-Soul, ScHoolboy Q, & Jay Rock)
- 12. "Back On Up"
- 13. "Outta Control" (feat. Reks)
- 14. "Smoke On" (feat. Dom Kennedy & Baby D)

=== Bumpy Knuckles & Statik Selektah – Ambition ===
- 01. Still Got It
- 02. Animalistic
- 03. Lyrical Workout (feat. N.O.R.E.)
- 04. Put The Beats On 'Em
- 05. Not What I Say
- 06. Don't Do Fake
- 07. Blast Yourself
- 08. Beat It Up
- 09. Pen Game
- 10. Who Did The Beat!?
- 11. Rock Solid
- 12. Ambition
- 13. For You
- 14. The Grand Finale
- 15. Pen Still Killa
- 16. Mic Bless'n Gun Press'n Impress'n (feat. O.C.)
- 17. Hear The Call
- 18. Just Rock'n Wit Bump
- 19. Find Urself

=== Freddie Gibbs – Baby Face Killa ===
- 09. "Krazy" (feat. Jadakiss & Jay Rock)
- 19. "Breaking Bad" (feat. Ea$y Money)

=== Sean Price – Mic Tyson ===
- 17. "Remember" (feat. Freddie Gibbs)

=== Termanology & Lil' Fame – Fizzyology ===
- 05. "From the Streets" (feat. Freeway)
- 14. "Crazy" (feat. M.O.P.)
- 15. "Thuggathon"

=== Pro Era – P.E.E.P: The aPROcalypse ===
- 01. "Like Water"
- 04. "F A Rap Critic"
- 07. "Interlude 47"

== 2013 ==
=== Raekwon – Lost Jewlry ===
- 01. "A Kings Chariot (Intro)"

=== Curren$y – New Jet City ===
- 02. "Clear" (feat. Jadakiss)

=== Jared Evan & Statik Selektah – Boom Bap & Blues ===
- 01. "Blue"
- 02. "Uma Thurman" (feat. Lil' Fame)
- 03. "The Devil Wears Prada"
- 04. "Black & White" (feat. Joey Bada$$)
- 05. "Pro Create" (feat. Action Bronson)
- 06. "Television" (feat. Wais P)
- 07. "Toast" (feat. Hoodie Allen)
- 08. "Night Light" (feat. Termanology)
- 09. "Are We Almost There Yet?"
- 10. "Sunday"
- 11. "Bad News"

=== Havoc – 13 ===
- 13. "Can't Sleep"

=== AZ ===
- 00. "We Movin'"

=== Statik Selektah – Extended Play ===
- 01. "Reloaded" (feat. Pain In Da Ass, Action Bronson, Big Body Bes, Termanology, & Tony Touch)
- 02. "Bird's Eye View" (feat. Raekwon, Joey Badass, & Black Thought)
- 03. "East Coast" (feat. N.O.R.E. & Lil' Fame)
- 04. "21 & Over" (feat. Sean Price & Mac Miller)
- 05. "The Spark" (feat. Action Bronson, Joey Badass, & Mike Posner)
- 06. "Make Believe" (feat. Freddie Gibbs, Ea$y Money, & Termanology)
- 07. "Pinky Ring" (feat. Prodigy)
- 08. "Funeral Season" (feat. Styles P, Bun B, & Hit-Boy)
- 09. "Bring 'Em Up Dead" (feat. Joell Ortiz)
- 10. "Camouflage Dons" (feat. Smif-n-Wessun & Flatbush Zombies)
- 11. "Big City of Dreams" (feat. Troy Ave, Push! Montana, Meyhem Lauren, & AG da Coroner)
- 12. "Gz, Pimps, Hustlers" (feat. Wais P & Slaine)
- 13. "My Hoe" (feat. Blu, Evidence, & Reks)
- 14. "Love & War" (feat. Ea$y Money & Freeway)
- 15. "100 Stacks" (feat. JFK & Strong Arm Steady)
- 16. "Live From The Era" (feat. Pro Era) (co-produced by The Alchemist)
- 17. "Game Break" (feat. Lecrae, Termanology, & Posdnuos)
- 18. "Home" (feat. Talib Kweli)

=== Black Dave – Stay Black 2 ===
- 12. "Back Up On My Bullshit" (feat. William Wilson)

=== Joey Bada$$ – Summer Knights ===
- 08. "Word Is Bond"

=== Astro – Starvin Like Marvin For A Cool J Song ===
- 02. "Didn't Know
- 05. "Stranger" (feat. Skyzoo)
- 07. "War (Interlude)" (feat. Wordspit The Illest)
- 08. "Lisa"

=== Tony Touch – The Piece Maker 3: Return of the 50 MC's ===
- 18. "A Queen's Thing" (feat. Action Bronson & Kool G Rap)

=== Statik Selektah & Ransom – The Proposal ===
- 01. "I Do"
- 02. "Unexplainable (feat. Ea$y Money)
- 03. "Outcast"
- 04. "Life of Sin"
- 05. "How It Feels"
- 06. "Jade"
- 07. "1996"
- 08. "It's Ransom" (feat. Styles P)
- 09. "Reservoir Scars"
- 10. "Start To Finish"
- 11. "Never Forget" (feat. Termanology)
- 12. "Dollars & Sense"

=== CJ Fly – Thee Way Eye See It ===
- 04. "Day zZz's"

=== Scoe – Tha Influence ===
- 17. "Somebody's Gotta Win"

=== Onyx ===
- 00. "We Get Live" (feat. Myster DL)

=== Serial Killers – Serial Killers Vol. 1 ===
- 07. "Legends Never Die"

=== H Blanco ===
- 00. "Blessed"

=== Styles P ===
- 00. "All I Got" (feat. Action Bronson & Ea$y Money)

=== Anarchy – DGKA (Dirty Ghetto King Anarchy) ===
- 09. "Loyalty"

=== Dead Heat – DBKPC ===
- 04. "My Illusion" (feat. Slaine)

=== Talib Kweli – Gravitas ===
- 06. "New Leaders" (feat. The Underachievers)

=== Troy Ave – White Christmas 2 ===
- 09. "Glitter and Gold"

=== Scoe – Tha Influence 2: X-Mas Treez ===
- 14. "Ooo Child"

=== Demrick ===
- 00. "Purple" (feat. Mistah F.A.B.)

== 2014 ==
=== Chris Gatsby – Middleground Morals & Money ===
- 03. "Keep It Moving"

=== Statik Selektah ===
- 00. "Welcome To The NBA" (feat. JFK, Wais P, & Joey B)

=== Sammy Adams – WIZZY ===
- 08. "Loser" (feat. Jared Evan & Ea$y Money)

=== Ab-Soul ===
- 00. "To The Max"

=== Mick Jenkins – The Water[s] ===
- 08. "Black Sheep"

=== The Underachievers – Cellar Door: Terminus Ut Exordium ===
- 03. "Radiance"

=== Statik Selektah – ...Comes Around EP ===
- 01. "Hard 2 Explain" (feat. Al-Doe, Termanology, Chris Rivers)
- 02. "Break" (feat. Astro)
- 03. "4 Brothers" (feat. LA the Darkman, Willie the Kid, Termanology)
- 04. "Nothing" (feat. Raven Sorvino, Chauncy Sherod)
- 05. "What you Need" (feat. Chris Miles)
- 06. "The Finish Line" (feat. brandUn DeShay, Alex Wiley)

=== Statik Selektah – What Goes Around ===
- 01. "What Goes Around" (feat. Lil' Fame & Ea$y Money)
- 02. "Carry On" (feat. Joey Bada$$ & Freddie Gibbs)
- 03. "The Thrill Is Back" (feat. Styles P & Talib Kweli)
- 04. "The Imperial" (feat. Action Bronson, Royce Da 5'9", & Black Thought)
- 05. "All The Way (Pimp Hop)" (feat. Snoop Dogg, Wais P, Ransom, & Chauncy Sherod)
- 06. "Back For You" (feat. Dilated Peoples)
- 07. "Alarm Clock" (feat. Ab-Soul, Jon Connor, & Logic)
- 08. "My Time" (feat. Black Dave, CJ Fly, Nyck Caution, & Josh Xantus)
- 09. "Fugazi" (feat. Sincere)
- 10. "Long Time" (feat. Action Bronson)
- 11. "Drunk & High" (feat. N.O.R.E., Termanology, & Reks)
- 12. "The Chopper" (feat. Jon Connor & Ransom)
- 13. "Down Like This" (feat. Sheek Louch, Pharoahe Monch, & Crooked I)
- 14. "Slum Villain" (feat. Joey Bada$$)
- 15. "Heltah Selektah" (feat. Heltah Skeltah)
- 16. "Overdose" (feat. B-Real & JFK)
- 17. "Something To Cry For" (feat. Boldy James)
- 18. "Rise Above" (feat. Astro & Dessy Hinds)
- 19. "Get Away" (feat. Joe Scudda & Colin Munroe)
- 20. "God Knows" (feat. Bun B, Jared Evan, & Posdnuos) + (Bonus Track: "That‘s What I Say" (feat. Kool Keith))

=== Jared Evan & Statik Selektah – Still Blue ===
- 01. "Still Blue"
- 02. "Scene"
- 03. "Baggage Claim" (feat. Michael Christmas)
- 04. "Moneyball" (feat. Nyck Caution & Dessy Hinds)
- 05. "When in Rome"
- 06. "The Background"
- 07. "Bass Is Low"
- 08. "Outside" (feat. Ransom)
- 09. "Layover"
- 10. "No One Else"

=== Shady Records – Shady XV ===
- 12. "Detroit vs. Everybody" (feat. Eminem, Royce da 5'9", Big Sean, Danny Brown, Dej Loaf, & Trick-Trick)

=== Chris Miles ===
- 00. "Topic Of Discussion"

=== Termanology – Shut Up and Rap ===
- 15. "El Wave" (feat. Willie The Kid & Reks) (co-produced by The Alchemist)

== 2015 ==
=== JFK ===
- 00. "Betrayal" (feat. Wade Barber)

=== Chatham The Sun ===
- 00. "Somethin For You & You" (feat. Mr. Cheeks)

=== Joey Bada$$ ===
- 00. "Born Day (AquariUS)"

=== Joey Bada$$ – B4.Da.$$ ===
- 01. "Save The Children"
- 09. "No. 99"
- 15. "Curry Chicken"
- 16. "Run Up On Ya" (feat. Action Bronson and Elle Varner)

=== Kool Keith ===
- 00. "My Sons"

=== Action Bronson – Mr. Wonderful ===
- 01. “Brand New Car” (co-produced with Mark Ronson)
- 02. "The Rising" (feat. Big Body Bes)

=== Millyz – SPED ===
- 04. "Substance"

=== Dessy Hinds ===
- 00. "Homecoming"

=== Your Old Droog ===
- 00. "Unlimited Metrocard"

=== Rick Gonzalez – Divine Mechanics ===
- 11. "Love & Money" (feat. Prodigy)

=== Ea$y Money – The Motive of Nearly Everybody, Yo ===
- 01. "Ea$y"
- 04. "All Been Waiting"
- 05. "For the Streets" (feat. Termanology)
- 06. "Hit the Fan" (feat. Lil' Fame & Chauncy Sherod)
- 07. "Go Time" (feat. Action Bronson)
- 08. "Connected" (feat. Rob White, Wais P & Joey Badass)
- 11. "The M.O.N.E.Y."
- 12. "Took It All Away" (feat. Jared Evan) (co-produced by Antman Wonder)

=== Ape The Grim – The Idealist ===
- 09. "Stetson Hats" (feat. Kool Keith)

=== Statik Selektah – Lucky 7 ===
- 1. "Intro" (feat. Hannibal Buress)
- 2. "Another Level" (feat. Rapsody)
- 3. "Beautiful Life" (feat. Action Bronson & Joey Bada$$)
- 4. "Hood Boogers" (feat. Your Old Droog & Chauncy Sherod)
- 5. "The Locker Room" (feat. Dave East)
- 6. "In the Wind" (feat. Joey Bada$$, Big K.R.I.T., & Chauncy Sherod)
- 7. "Crystal Clear" (feat. Royce Da 5'9")
- 8. "How You Feel" (feat. Mick Jenkins)
- 9. "Murder Game" (feat. Smif-n-Wessun, Young M.A, & Buckshot)
- 10. "Gentlemen" (feat. Illa Ghee, Sean Price, & Lil'Fame)
- 11. "Bodega!" (feat. Bodega Bamz)
- 12. "The Trophy Room" (feat. Skyzoo, Ea$y Money, Domo Genesis, & Masspike Miles)
- 13. "Sucker Free" (feat. JFK)
- 14. "Wall Flowers" (feat. Your Old Droog, Termanology, & Lord Sear)
- 15. "Top Tier" (feat. Sean Price, Bun B, & Styles P)
- 16. "Silver Lining" (feat. A$AP Twelvyy, Kirk Knight, & Chauncy Sherod)
- 17. "Cold" (feat. Wais P & Jared Evan)
- 18. "All You Need" (feat. Action Bronson, Ab-Soul, & Elle Varner)
- 19. "Scratch Off" (feat. CJ Fly, Talib Kweli, & Cane)
- 20. "Alone" (feat. Joey Bada$$)
- 21. "Harley's Blues"

=== Capone-N-Noreaga – Lessons ===
- 12. "Now" (feat. Tragedy Khadafi)

=== Sean Price ===
- 00. "Admiral Meets General" (feat. Jakk Frost)

=== Termanology – Term Brady EP ===
- 04. "Spit Real Game" (feat. Ransom)
- 07. "World Tour"

=== Typ iLL – Veterans Day ===
- 01. "Hennessy Lane"
- 02. "Typ Statik"
- 03. "Around Here"
- 04. "The Hustle"
- 05. "Onyx"
- 06. "Dog Tags & Duffle Bags"
- 07. "Soldier"
- 08. "Let Em Talk"
- 09. "Arielle"
- 10. "Support Ya Troop"

=== Bless – Spoils Of War ===
- 07. "Pop Off"

=== Various Artists – Prosto Mixtape Cztery ===
- 12. "Pierwszy Walkman" (Bialas, Obywatel MC, & VNM)

=== Black Thought ===
- 00. "Couldn't Tell"

== 2016 ==
=== Progress – U Ain't Hip ===
- 03. "Lord Forgive 'Em" (feat. Ransom & Ea$y Money)

=== Statik KXNG (Statik Selektah & KXNG Crooked) ===
- 00. "February 12th (Part 1)"
- 00. "February 12th (Part 2)"

=== Statik KXNG (Statik Selektah & KXNG Crooked) – Statik KXNG ===
- 01. "I Hear Voices"
- 02. "Magic & Bird"
- 03. "Lost a Fan"
- 04. "Everybody Know"
- 05. "Dead or in Jail"
- 06. "Stop Playing"
- 07. "Good Gone Bad"
- 08. "Let's Go" (feat. Termanology)
- 09. "Bitch Got Me Fucked Up"
- 10. "Brand New Shit"

=== Joey Bada$$ ===
- 00. "Ready"
- 00. "Brooklyn's Own"

=== Westside Gunn – FLYGOD ===
- 13. "50 Inch Zenith" (feat. Skyzoo)

=== Cane – The Dark Hours ===
- 01. "Take Time" (feat. Termanology)

=== Conway The Machine ===
- 00. "Birdy"

=== Concise Kilgore – Kil Joy Division ===
- 06. "GB1B" (feat. Rasco)

=== Various Artists – Meet the Blacks (Soundtrack) ===
- 06. "Street Music" (as Statik KXNG)

=== SuperSTah Snuk – Man Of 1,000 Styles ===
- 03. "Falling In Love"

=== Foul Monday – I Hate Monday ===
- 15. "Skid Row" (feat. Metta World Peace, Mr. Challace, & Ruc Mr. QB)

=== Statik Selektah & 2 Chainz ===
- 00. "Smoke Break"

=== Prodigy ===
- 00. "Live From Bushwick" (feat. Big Twins) (co-produced by The Alchemist)

=== Jarren Benton – Slow Motion Vol. 2 ===
- 16. "Miss You"

=== Big Kurt – M.A.B.U.S. – The Serious Business Mixtape Vol. 3 ===
- 12. "The Gate Keepers" (feat. Reks, King Spyda, Esoteric, Slaine, & Termanology)

=== Jabee – Black Future ===
- 12. "Exhausted"

=== Reks – The Greatest X ===
- 02. "A.N.O.N.Y.M.O.U.S"
- 16. "Pray for Me: The Genocide Note"

=== Ras Kass – Intellectual Property ===
- 18. "Promised Land"

=== Statik Selektah ===
- 00. "Love Changes"

=== Grafh ===
- 00. "Rah Rah"

=== La Coka Nostra – To Thine Own Self Be True ===
- 05. "Stay True"

=== Randy Reimer & Wade Barber ===
- 00. "Heroin Man"

=== Termanology – More Politics ===
- 06. "Let's Go (Part 2)" (feat. KXNG Crooked)
- 07. "Top Shotta" (feat. Joey Bada$$)
- 09. "First Love" (feat. Sean Taylor)
- 10. "The Last Time"
- 11. "Moving Forward" (feat. Kendra Foster)
- 12. "The Curve" (feat. Westside Gunn, Conway the Machine, & Your Old Droog)
- 13. "Bar Show" (feat. Ea$y Money & Chris Rivers)

=== Various Artists – A3C Vol. 6 ===
- 22. "Free" (Oswin Benjamin)

=== Various Artists – The Best of A3C (Remixed by Statik Selektah) ===
- 01. Muslim Wedding (Statik Selektah Remix) (Action Bronson)
- 02. Stretched Out (Statik Selektah Remix) (Dave East)
- 03. 3hree Kings (Statik Selektah Remix) (The Underachievers feat. Freeway)
- 04. Skitzo (Statik Selektah Remix) (Jarren Benton)
- 05. Rebel (Statik Selektah Remix) (G-Eazy)
- 06. Victory (Statik Selektah Remix) (Moosh & Twist)
- 07. Vicodin (Statik Selektah Remix) (Vince Staples)
- 08. Free Nation Rebel Soldier 2 (Statik Selektah Remix) (Mick Jenkins)
- 09. Salty (Statik Selektah Remix) (Michael Christmas)
- 10. Man Down (Statik Selektah Remix) (The Great Outdoors)

=== Frank Castle – B.U.T.T.E.R. ===
- 10. "Prepare 4 The Worst"

== 2017 ==
=== Randy Reimer ===
- 00. "Roll Up" (feat. Slaine)

=== Wiki & Your Old Droog – What Happened To Fire? ===
- 03. "Vigilantes"

=== KuuL ===
- 00. "L.W.L. (Link With Legend)"

=== Crimeapple ===
- 00. "Damage Control"

=== Joey Bada$$ – All-Amerikkkan Badass ===
- 09. "Super Predator" (feat. Styles P)
- 11. "Legendary" (feat. J. Cole)

=== ANoyd – A Time And Place ===
- 05. "Name Brand Water" (co-produced by Jake One and Swish)

=== Joyner Lucas – 508-507-2209 ===
- 09. "Way To Go" (feat. Snoh Aalegra) (co-produced by Boi-1da)

=== Typ iLL – 30 Days ===
- 02. "Let It Bang (30 Days)"

=== The Burn Unit (Statik Selektah, Smoke DZA, Trademark Da Skydiver, & Young Roddy) – The Burn Unit ===
- 00. "How Many?"

=== Joey Bada$$ ===
- 00. "Love Is Only A Feeling"
- 00. "Too Lit"
- 00. "500 Benz"

=== ST. da Squad – Self Titled ===
- 03. "Definition"
- 09. "It's The ST. 2.0 (Let 'Em Know)"
- 15. "To The Beat"

=== T.O.N.Y ===
- 00. "Gladiator School" (feat. Termanology)

=== Slaine & Termanology – Anti-Hero ===
- 04. "Some Other Shit" (feat. Madchild)
- 06. "Land Of The Lost"
- 08. "Blink Of An Eye" (feat. Ras Kass)

=== Conway The Machine– More Steroids ===
- 08. "3 Bodies"

=== Pomer & Dirty Sanchez – Polo Palm Trees EP ===
- 01. "Couldn´t Relate"

=== Statik Selektah – 8 ===
- 01. "Harley's Blues (The World Could Save)" (feat. Harley Harl & Francesca)
- 02. "Man Of The Hour" (feat. 2 Chainz & Wiz Khalifa)
- 03. "Put Jewels On It" (feat. Run the Jewels)
- 04. "Watching Myself" (feat. Action Bronson)
- 05. "Get Down" (feat. Wale & Phil Ade)
- 06. "Ain't a Damn Thing Change" (feat. G-Eazy, Joey Badass, & Enisa)
- 07. "But You Don't Hear Me Tho" (feat. The Lox & Mtume)
- 08. "No. 8" (feat. Conway The Machine, Westside Gunn, Termanology)
- 09. "What Can We Do (Parts 1 & 2)" (feat. ANoyd, Crimeapple, Avenue, Nick Grant, Millyz, & Chris Rivers)
- 10. "Don't Run" (feat. Joyner Lucas)
- 11. "Go Gettas" (feat. Wais P, Sean Price, & Tek)
- 12. "Slept to Death" (feat. Curren$y & Cousin Stizz)
- 13. "Everything (Show Me Love)" (feat. PnB Rock & Lil Fame)
- 14. "Nobody Move" (feat. Raekwon & Royce da 5'9")
- 15. "Shakem Up" (feat. B-Real & Everlast)
- 16. "Pull the Curtain Back" (feat. No Malice)
- 17. "Disrespekt" (feat. Prodigy) (co-produced by The Alchemist)
- 18. "All Said & Done /// (JFK's 8 Ball Outro)" (feat. Plays & Juelz Santana)

=== Rigz – I Got Samples ===
- 12. "None Of Dat"

== 2018 ==
=== MC WhiteOwl – Born Yesterday ===
- 02. "One Chance"
- 06. "Slave" (feat. Serge Boogie)
- 08. "No Interference" (feat. Akbar & Rhinoceros Funk)

=== Quadir Lateef – Ugly Face EP ===
- 02. "Slave Hands To Shaved Grams"
- 03. "I Ain't Lettin Go"
- 05. "The Healing"
- 06. "Real Men Cry Too"
- 08. "The Exorcism"

=== Jaysaun - Kill Ya Boss ===
- 15. "Kings"

=== Westside Gunn – Supreme Blientele ===
- 15. "WESTSIDE"

=== Termanology – Bad Decisions ===
- 01. "Take 'Em Back"
- 04. "Passport Kingz" (feat. Raekwon)

=== Millyz & Statik Selektah – Saints X Sinners ===
- 01. "Let It Go" (feat. Jadakiss)
- 02. "Pick 'Em' Up"
- 03. "Addiction" (feat. Dyce Payne)
- 04. "Frost Bite"
- 05. "Glum" (feat. Annalese)
- 06. "My Old Life" (feat. Termanology)
- 07. "F.a.M.I.L.Y."
- 08. "Life's Deeper"
- 09. "Like the Way It Feel"
- 10. "Communion"

=== Conway the Machine – Everybody Is F.O.O.D. ===
- 09. "Sky Joint 2" (feat. Skyzoo)

=== Dirty Sanchez – New Yuck City ===
- 02. "Heavy Thinker"

=== St. Da Squad - Self-Titled ===
- 03. "Definition"
- 09. "It´s the St. 2.0 (Let Em´ know)"
- 15. "To the Beat"

=== 1982 – Still 1982 ===
- 01. "6 Years Later (Intro)"
- 02. "Still" (feat. Kendra Foster)
- 03. "Just Can't Let Go"
- 04. "30 Shots" (feat. Chris Rivers & Conway the Machine)
- 05. "Haunted" (feat. UFO Fev)
- 06. "Fuck Ya Lyfestyle" (feat. Nems & Beamz)
- 07. "Crimeology" (feat. Crimeapple)
- 08. "It's On You" (feat. Lil Fame & Haile Supreme)
- 09. "Party Crashers (Interlude)"
- 10. "Never Let My City Down" (feat. Mtume)
- 11. "Different Now" (feat. CJ Fly)
- 12. "Do It On My Own"

=== Pro Era – P.E.E.P: The aPROcalypse (Re-Release) ===
- 18. "Know the Rules"

== 2019 ==
=== Mass Appeal – Starting 5: Vol. 1 ===
- 01. "Apostles" (Fashawn, Nas, Ezri)

=== Big.D & Easy Mo Bee - This is my Life ===
- 08. "Reach out" (feat. Darkim Allah)

=== Raz Fresco - Baking Instructions: Recipe #1 ===
- 13. "Choose Sides (U-N-I)"

=== Statik Selektah – Mahalo ===
- 01. "For Your Love"
- 02. "Faze Won"
- 03. "Movin In"
- 04. "South Seas"
- 05. "Tropic Lights"
- 06. "Lay Low"
- 07. "I Remember"
- 08. "Interlood Mood"
- 09. "Pair a Dice"
- 10. "Exotik"
- 11. "Moana Mall"
- 12. "You Win"
- 13. "Day Dreaming Outro"

=== Plays & Statik Selektah - Piecework ===
- 01. "First 48"
- 02. "Steppin"
- 03. "Bravo" (feat. Juelz Santana)
- 04. "Self made" (feat. Neem)
- 05. "Fired"
- 06. "Sunday School"
- 07. "We on" (feat. Termanology)
- 08. "I know" (feat. Zar)
- 09. "Said and done" (feat. Juelz Santana)
- 10. "We made it"

=== Bobby J From Rockaway - Summer Classics ===
- 02. "Walter White”
- 09. "Blue Eyed Soul"

=== Bun B & Statik Selektah – TrillStatik ===
- 01. "Moving Mountains" (feat. Jovanie)
- 02. "Still Trill" (feat. Method Man & Grafh)
- 03. "Basquiat" (feat. Fat Joe & Smoke DZA)
- 04. "Concrete" (feat. Westside Gunn & Termanology)
- 05. "Money" (feat. Lil Fame & Wais P)
- 06. "Superstarr" (feat. Meechy Darko, CJ Fly, & Haile Supreme)
- 07. "Paperwork" (feat. Uncle Murda)
- 08. "T.B.A." (feat. Propain & Killa Kyleon)
- 09. "Time Flies" (feat. Big K.R.I.T. & Talib Kweli)
- 10. "I Know" (feat. Haile Supreme)
- 11. "All Good" (feat. Tobe Nwigwe)
- 12. "Jon Snow" (feat. Paul Wall & Le$)
- 13. "Lemons"
- 14. "How the Game Go"

=== Wiz Khalifa – Fly Times Vol. 1: The Good Fly Young ===
- 09. "Gold Bottles" (feat. Young Deji) (co-produced by Marv4MoBeats)
- 10. "Taylor Life" (feat. Sosamann) (co-produced by Dreamlife Beats)

=== Rome Streetz - Noise Kandy 3: The Overdose ===
- 04. "World in my Palm"

=== Curren$y & Statik Selektah – Gran Turismo ===
- 01. "Theme Music"
- 02. "Clear Pt. 2" (feat. Jadakiss)
- 03. "Nothin´New" (feat. Haile Supreme & Wiz Khalifa)
- 04. "At Night" (feat. Haile Supreme & Jim Jones)
- 05. "Dirty World"
- 06. "Nothin´Less" (feat. YBN Cordae)
- 07. "Gran Turismo" (feat. Termanology)
- 08. "Friend or Foe"
- 09. "Outside"
- 10. "Forever"

=== ANoyd & Statik Selektah - Yuck! ===
- 01. "Yuck!" (feat. Haile Supreme)
- 02. "The Mood"
- 03. "Purple"
- 04. "New Legends" (feat. Nick Grant)
- 05. "Mama Porch"
- 06. "Kilos" (feat. Termanology & UFO Fev)
- 07. "Someone like me"
- 08. "Already"
- 09. "Tomorrow"
- 10. "Darks & Lights"

=== Nas – Lost Tapes 2 ===
- 04. "Lost Freestyle"

=== Conway The Machine - Look What I Became ===
- 09. "You Made It" (feat. Amber Simone)

=== Big Kahuna OG & Fly Anakin ===
- 00. "Mood Swings"

=== Radamiz - Nothing Changes If Nothing Changes ===
- 09. "Fake Gucci" (co-produced by Vintage Vandals)

=== Westside Gunn - Hitler Wears Hermes VII ===
- 07. "Kelly´s Korner" (feat. Fat Joe)

=== Paul Wall & Statik Selektah - Give Thanks ===
- 01. "What it do"
- 02. "Mind blowin" (feat. B-Real)
- 03. "Stop me" (feat. CJ Fly)
- 04. "Overcame" (feat. Benny The Butcher)
- 05. "Part of the Game" (feat. Nems & Haile Supreme)
- 06. "R U willin" (feat. Termanology & Mia Jae)
- 07. "Sea the Shore" (feat. Haile Supreme)

=== Stunna Gang & Statik Selektah - Powerful Musik ===
- 01. "God Body Tendency"
- 02. "Awesome"
- 03. "In the Ruff" (feat. Haile Supreme)
- 04. "The Gangman"
- 05. "Reaper" (feat. Haile Supreme)
- 06. "No Squares" (feat. Haile Supreme)
- 07. "Powerful Musik"

=== Termanology - Vintage Horns ===
- 04. "Nobody" (feat. Eto & Tek)
- 06. "Signs" (feat. Wais P & Haile Supreme)
- 07. "Lost in my Pain" (feat. 38 Spesh & Simba Selassie)

== 2020 ==
=== Wais P – Chinchilla ===
- 01. "You Never Know" (feat. Haile Supreme)
- 02. "So Easy" (feat. Termanology)
- 03. "Time Is Money"
- 04. "My Lane"
- 05. "RNL"
- 06. "No Rules" (feat. Nems)
- 07. "Walk On By"
- 08. "Mourn" (feat. Paul Wall)

=== UFO Fev & Statik Selektah - Fresh Air ===
- 01. "Fresh Air"
- 02. "Golden Soul"
- 03. "On My Way" (feat. Jose Santiago)
- 04. "Clean Up" (feat. Haile Supreme)
- 05. "Bad Luck"
- 06. "Slow Dancing"
- 07. "Hard Rock" (feat. Termanology, Ransom & Eto)
- 08. "One Time"
- 09. "Not Today" (feat. Haile Supreme)
- 10. "Only A Dream"

=== G. Huff & Lena Jackson ===
- 00. "Another Dead Rapper (Statik Selektah Remix)" (feat. M.O.P.)

=== Smoke DZA - A Closed Mouth Don‘t Get Fed ===
- 05. "Brick On My Neck"

=== CJ Fly & Statik Selektah - Rudebwoy ===
- 01. "Goin Thru" (feat. T´Nah)
- 02. "Rudebwoy" (feat. Joey Bada$$)
- 03. "Barrell" (feat. Haile Supreme)
- 04. "Grew Up" (feat. Haile Supreme)
- 05. "Show You"
- 06. "I Tried" (feat. Oshun)
- 07. "Block Party" (feat. Kirk Knight)
- 08. "City We From" (feat. Conway the Machine)
- 09. "Jooks"
- 10. "LV Ascot"
- 11. "Strugglin"
- 12. "Hard Times" (feat. Lexipaz)
- 13. "The Pros" (feat. Pro Era)

=== 1982 (Termanology & Statik Selektah) - The Quarantine ===
- 01. "Pandemic"
- 02. "Relatable" (feat. Kota the Friend, CJ Fly)
- 03. "Another Day" (feat. UFO Fev, Marlon Craft)
- 04. "This Too Shall Pass" (feat. Grafh, Haile Supreme)
- 05. "Love Don´t Stop" (feat. Nems)
- 06. "All Facts"
- 07. "Morphine" (feat. Lil Fame)
- 08. "Walk With Me" (feat. Tek, Lil Fame)
- 09. "You Kno What Time It Is" (feat. JFK)
- 10. "Does It All Even Matter" (feat. Allan Kingdom)

=== Slik Jack - Dicey Business ===
- 01. "Smoked Salmon Bagel"
- 02. "Capo" (feat. Poli, Blaq Poet)
- 03. "No Introductions" (feat. Edo G)
- 04. "Armani Suit" (feat. Rico Blox)
- 05. "Bad Moon Rise"
- 06. "GrindState" (feat. Chuck Strangers, Pacewon)
- 07. "Movin In"
- 08. "Air It Out" (feat. Don Streat)
- 09. "Livin Darkness" (feat. Bub Styles)
- 10. "Armani Suit (Remix)" (feat. Rico Blox)

=== Eto - The Beauty Of It ===
- 06. "Rusty Stainless" (feat. Willie the Kid, Rome Streetz)

=== Jabee - "This World Is So Fragile And Cruel I´m Glad I Got You" ===
- 09. "Checcmate" (feat. Slug, Lil B)
- 12. "Our Sons" (feat. Trishes)

=== The Notorious B.I.G. ===
- 00. "Bastard Child" (Unreleased)

=== Bobby J From Rockaway - Endless Summer ===
- 01. "You Know the Vibes"
- 02. "Where I’m From"
- 03. "Moonlight"
- 04. "Ungrateful" (feat. Haile Supreme)
- 05. "Autumn Leaves"

=== Rockwelz & John Jigg$ - Night Flex In L.E.S. ===
- 09. "Classy Dons"

=== Wiz Khalifa - Big Pimpin ===
- 02. "Slim Peter"

=== Joey Bada$$ - The Light Pack ===
- 01. "The Light"
- 03. "Shine"

=== Nyck Caution - Open Flame EP ===
- 03. "Margot Robbie"

=== Liam Tracy ===
- 00. "Heartless"

=== Skkool - Beignets 2 ===
- 01. "Caviar"
- 02. "Brainstormin"
- 03. "Spoken Game"
- 04. "Unsettled"
- 05. "Zoom In"

=== JFK & Wade Barber - The Growth ===
- 01. "Elements"
- 02. "The Growth"
- 03. "Rock Bottom" (feat. Paul Wall)
- 04. "In Your Area"
- 05. "Legends"
- 06. "Eighteen" (feat. Millyz)
- 07. "Groundwork"
- 08. "Visualize"
- 09. "Better Days"
- 10. "Innovate"
- 11. "Say Goodbye"
- 12. "New Normal" (feat. Casino Cash)

=== The LOX - Living Off Xperience ===
- 08. "Come Back"

=== Reks - T.H.I.N.G.S. (The Hunger Inside Never Gets Satisfied) ===
- 05. "The Complex" (feat. Pharaohe Monch)

=== Kojoe, B.D., ELIONE & ¥ellow Bucks ===
- 00. "T.K.N.Y."

=== Fat Beats Records - Baker's Dozen XIII ===
- 04. "Watamu"

=== Smoke DZA - Homegrown ===
- 06. "Bank Withdrawal" (feat. Tish Hyman, Numberz)
- 10. "Union Dues" (feat. NymLo, Berner)

=== Statik Selektah - The Balancing Act ===
- 01. "The Healing" (feat. Black Thought)
- 02. "Keep It Moving" (feat. Nas, Joey Bada$$, Gary Clark Jr.)
- 03. "Play Around" (feat. Allan Kingdom, Killer Mike, 2 Chainz, Conway the Machine)
- 04. "Hard Living" (feat. Dave East, Method Man)
- 05. "Time" (feat. Jack Harlow)
- 06. "Watch Me" (feat. Joey Bada$$)
- 07. "America Is Cancelled" (feat. Termanology, Styles P, Jadakiss)
- 08. "No Substitute" (feat. Brady Watt, Paul Wall, Benny the Butcher)
- 09. "Off My Mind" (feat. Haile Supreme, Fly Anakin, Rome Streetz)
- 10. "Welcome To The Game" (feat. Kota the Friend, Marlon Craft, Haile Supreme)
- 11. "Soul Custody" (feat. Blu, Evidence)
- 12. "No More" (feat. Rim da Villin, Smoke DZA, Lil Fame)
- 13. "Ralph Lauren´s Closet" (feat. Sean Price, Thirstin Howl III)
- 14. "Balance Beam" (feat. JFK, CJ Fly, Nick Grant)
- 15. "Way Up" (feat. Haile Supreme, Havoc, Bun B)
- 16. "Immortal (feat. Harley Harl, Bobby Sessions)

=== Flash - I´ma Die A King ===
- 04. "Just Another Body" (feat. Ransom, Lil Fame)

== 2021 ==
=== Joey Bada$$ ===
- 00. "Let It Breathe"

=== Papoose - January ===
- 04. "I Wanna Know"
- 07. "Brave Thinker"

=== Chris Crack - Might Delete Later ===
- 14. "Flip Phone Hangup" (feat. U.G.L.Y. Boy Modeling)

=== Slaine - The Things We Can't Forgive ===
- 09. "The Things We Can't Forgive" (feat. Rike Hook)

=== Kipp Stone - Faygo Baby ===
- 01. "Manic"

=== CJ Fly & Statik Selektah - Rudebwoy B Sides ===
- 01. "Mami"
- 02. "Regardless"
- 03. "For A Cost/Cause"
- 04. "Goodbye"
- 05. "If I Had"
- 06. "Overwhelmed"

=== Ea$y Money & Fabeyon - BEYOND EA$Y ===
- 02. "Money Can Buy"
- 08. "Peep The Language"
- 13. "Peep The Language (Remix)" (feat. Ransom, Nems, UFO Fev)

=== Kota the Friend - To Kill A Sunrise ===
- 01. "WOLVES"
- 02. "HATE"
- 03. "The COLD"
- 04. "The LOVE"
- 05. "Go Now" (feat. Haile Supreme)
- 06. "What Ya Sayin"
- 07. "LIVE & Direct"
- 08. "Day Glow"
- 09. "SUNRISE"
- 10. "SUNSET"

=== Jake James ===
- 00. "Celebration" (feat. Stacy Barthe)

=== Dirty Sanchez ===
- 00. "Way Out" (feat. Nyck Caution)

=== Papoose - April ===
- 03. "The Internet Is Gone"

=== Kooley High - Lazy Sunday EP ===
- 04. "Lazy Sunday - Statik Selektah Remix" (feat. Melanie Charles)

=== Lou From Paradise - Not Dead Yet ===
- 01. "Brainless"
- 02. "Not Dead Yet"
- 03. "Anitfreeze"
- 04. "Cold Shoulder"
- 05. "Outside Wit Psychoz"
- 06. "Stray Dog Freestyle"

=== 1982 (Termanology & Statik Selektah) - The Summer EP ===
- 01. "Summer In New York" (feat. Skyzoo, Jared Evan)
- 02. "Stay Fly" (feat. Bun B, C-Scharp)
- 03. "Close To Me" (feat. Sammy Adams, Mia Jae)

=== Marlon Craft - Homecourt Advantage Vol. 1 ===
- 09. "Dead-Ish"

=== Def Jam - The One And Only Dick Gregory ===
- 07. "Get Down" (feat. Talib Kweli, Haile Supreme)

=== Trilly Trills ===
- 00. "El Puerto (Butter)"

=== Ea$y Money - Ea$y Money Presents... Gwapi Chulo ===
- 04. "Better Together" (feat. Termanology)

=== Wais P - T.A.P.A.S. 2 ===
- 02. "Pimp Cup" (feat. Ransom)
- 06. "Clubber Lang" (feat. Paul Wall, Termanology, Kxng Crooked)

=== UFO Fev - Prayer, Weed & Music ===
- 07. "Bout Them Dollas" (feat. Anoyd)

=== Mic North ===
- 00. "Sacrifice"

=== Russ - Chomp 2 ===
- 12. "Get It" (feat. Lloyd Banks, CyHi The Prynce)

=== JFK - 21 Bridges ===
- 01. "21 Bridges (Intro)"
- 02. "Danger" (feat. C Wells)
- 03. "Can´t Lie To God" (feat. Destruct)
- 04. "Right Or Wrong" (feat. Nash Boogie, Big Dese)
- 05. "Time To Collect"
- 06. "Against Us"
- 07. "Fetty Pills"
- 08. "Get Up"
- 09. "Sorry" (feat. Casino Cash)

=== Justin Tyme ===
- 00. "Anti Dope" (feat. Stove God Cooks, Styles P)

== 2022 ==
=== AZ - Doe or Die II (Deluxe Version) ===
- 15. "Motorola Era" (feat. 2 Chainz)
- 17. "This Is Mine"

=== Death Row Records - Dogg on it: Death Row Mixtape Vol. 1 (NFT) ===
- 00. "Scared 2 Death" (feat. Millyz)

=== Lyfe Crisis - Lost Cauze ===
- 01. "Move Away"
- 02. "Voices" (feat. Mr. Ent)
- 05. "Here We Go" (feat. Mr. Ent)

=== Wade Barber - BARBER ===
- 05. "Metaverse"
- 10. "Pay Homage"

=== Termanology & Paul Wall - Start 2 Finish ===
- 01. "No Asterisk"
- 02. "Ask Permission"
- 05. "No Favors (Pt. 2)" (feat. C Scharp)
- 06. "Clubber Lang" (feat. Wais P, Kxng Crooked)
- 08. "No Tolerance" (feat. Fly Anakin, Nems)
- 10. "Step Outside" (feat. Millyz, Jared Evan)

=== Method Man ===
- 00. "Come Get Some" (feat. PXWER, inTeLL)

=== OT The Real - Maxed out ===
- 01. "Loyalty" (feat. Gillie Da Kid, Shaquille O'Neal, Wallo267)
- 02. "Make It Count"
- 03. "Revelations"
- 04. "Hardcore" (feat. Freeway)
- 05. "Turned On Me"
- 06. "The Bottom" (feat. Merkules)
- 07. "Treachery" (feat. G-Weeder)
- 08. "Windows"
- 09. "Came Up Fast"
- 10. "History"

=== Joey Bada$$ - 2000 ===
- 02. "Make Me Feel"
- 03. "Where I Belong"
- 06. "Eulogy"
- 08. "One Of Us" (feat. Larry June)
- 10. "Show Me"
- 12. "Head High"

=== Termanology - Determination ===
- 01. "Determination" (feat. DJ Kay Slay)
- 09. "Take Me To The Plug" (feat. UFO Fev)
- 10. "Just Another Day" (feat. Fashawn)
- 13. "Cartier Aroma" (feat. Tragedy Khadafi)

=== IDK - W13 ===
- 01. "Drive"

=== Divine - Gunehgar ===
- 9. "Hitman"

=== Termanology - Rapping With My Friends ===
- 04. "Put You On (Interlude)"
- 08. "Congratulations" (feat. Xp The Marxman, Solene)

=== Bun B & Statik Selektah - TrillStatik 2 ===
- 01. "Right Back At It"
- 02. "Building Bridges" (feat. Termanology, Paul Wall)
- 03. "In My Hand" (feat. Big K.R.I.T., Cal Wayne)
- 04. "We Live" (feat. Dave East, Jinell)
- 05. "Devastating" (feat. Styles P, Propain)
- 06. "Every Hour" (feat. Nems, Papoose)
- 07. "Only Life I Know" (feat. Smoke DZA, Flee Lord, Haile Supreme)
- 08. "Acetone" (feat. Boldy James)
- 09. "Ain´t No Tellin" (feat. 38 Spesh, Grafh, Haile Supreme)
- 10. "There Comes A Time" (feat. Armand Assante)

=== JFK & Wade Barber - #AGE ===
- 01. "Makaveli"
- 03. "Ghost Guns"
- 04. "Fadeaway"
- 05. "Lost"
- 06. "Somebody" (feat. Destruct)
- 07. "Not Afraid" (feat. Problemattik)
- 08. "Nostalgia"
- 09. "Stank (2012)" (feat. Statik Selektah)
- 10. "Contrarians"
- 12. "For The Moment (Outro)"

== 2023 ==
=== Otis Oak ===
- 00. "Class In Session"

=== Kota the Friend - Lyrics To Go, Vol. 4 ===
- 02. "Pennywise"
- 03. "Life Lessons"
- 04. "Vultures"

=== Casket D. - Calculated ===
- 01. "Nasal Drip"
- 02. "Careless Whisper" (feat. COLTx)
- 03. "Pit Boss"
- 04. "The Math"

=== Dirty Sanchez 47 ===
- 00. "Last Strike"

=== SH4MEL ===
- 00. "Bad News"

=== Kota the Friend - To See A Sunset (Deluxe Version) ===
- 01. "Brick By Brick" (feat. Blu)
- 02. "Grace" (feat. Hannah Got Raps)
- 03. "High Noon"
- 04. "Go Brooklyn"
- 05. "New Money" (feat. Cozz)
- 06. "Real Ones"
- 07. "Elevator"
- 08. "Maybe So"
- 09. "One Life"
- 10. "High Alert" (feat. Termanology)
- 11. "Valleys"
- 12. "Church Shoes" (feat. Conchez)
- 13. "Eye See U"
- 14. "Hold Me Down" (feat. Shane Eagle)
- 15. "Free Not Woke"
- 16. "Real Ones Remix" (feat. Louie Tha Profit, Nachaash G, Michael Minelli)
- 17. "Rocky 6” (feat. CJ Fly)
- 18. "Thank You" (Bonus Track included)

=== Nym Lo - From The Horse´s Mouth ===
- 01. "Shark Fin"
- 02. "A Million At The Villa"
- 03. "A Kid From The Town" (feat. Curren$y)
- 04. "I Love The Game" (feat. Dave East)
- 05. "Money Machine"
- 06. "Crystal Controls" (feat. Rome Streetz)
- 07. "Palawan Don"
- 08. "Ice Jackets" (feat. Termanology, Bun B, Planet Asia)
- 09. "Exuma Island"

=== Ransom ===
- 00. "Love Lost" (feat. J. Arrr)

=== Ill Bill - Billy ===
- 16. "Sunday At The Tunnel"

=== Haile Supreme ===
- 00. "TNT"

=== Russ - Chomp 2.5 ===
- 02. "Blow The Whistle"

=== Statik Selektah - Mahalo 2 ===
- 01. "My Harl (Live From The Laylow)"
- 02. "Wind Down Love"
- 03. "Between Goodbyes"
- 04. "Out Of Time"
- 05. "Sing A Song"
- 06. "No Solution"
- 07. "Nope"
- 08. "Mackin"
- 09. "Sweet!"
- 10. "Revelations"
- 11. "Dream Upon"
- 12. "Nightmare in Paradise"

=== Statik Selektah - Round Trip ===
- 01. "Round Trip (For Dave)" (feat. Posdnuos)
- 02. "Historic" (feat. Ransom, AZ)
- 03. "Different League" (feat. Benny the Butcher, Termanology)
- 04. "Can‘t Stop" (feat. Stove God Cooks, Symba, Nina Sky)
- 05. "Unpredictable" (feat. Inspectah Deck, Method Man, Raekwon, Ghostface Killah)
- 06. "Ain‘t Too Much To It" (feat. Conway the Machine, Ab-Soul, Bun B)
- 07. "Life & Times" (feat. Joey Bada$$)
- 08. "Droppin Bodies" (feat. Millyz)
- 09. "It’s Different" (feat. M.O.P., Cormega)
- 10. "Lion Hearted" (feat. Elzhi, Boldy James)
- 11. "The New Joe" (feat. Nems)
- 12. "One 4 Ages" (feat. Tha God Fahim)
- 13. "Right Here" (feat. Marco Plus, Kota the Friend)
- 14. "Limbo" (feat. Russ)
- 15. "The Code" (feat. Reuben Vincent, Rome Streetz, Lukah)
- 16. "Got 2 Give" (feat. Redveil)
- 17. "Vanilla Sky" (feat. G-Eazy)
- 18. "Factory" (feat. IDK)
- 19. "In The Pocket" (feat. Logic)
- 20. "Full Circle (Showoff Crew)" (feat. Termanology, Reks, JFK, Ea$y Money, Harley Harl)

=== Paul Wall & Termanology - Start Finish Repeat ===
- 01. "Wall Paper (No Chit Chat)"
- 02. "Palm Trees" (feat. AZ, Solene)
- 03. "It´s Magic" (feat. CL Smooth)
- 06. "Positive Vibes" (feat. Tony Sunshine)
- 11. "Leather Recliner" (feat. Mia Jae)
- 12. "Real Life"
- 13. "No Apologies" (feat. Bun B, De'Andre Nico)

=== Bun B & Statik Selektah - TrillStatik 3 ===
- 01. "Welcome Back"
- 02. "Trillselda" (feat. Benny the Butcher, Rome Streetz)
- 03. "Set In Stone" (feat. Method Man, JFK)
- 04. "We Got A Problem, Houston" (feat. Boldy James, Paul Wall)
- 05. "Super Legend" (feat. Nems, Smif-N-Wessun)
- 06. "Outside" (feat. Millyz, Propain, Mia Jae)
- 07. "Day In The Life" (feat. Kota the Friend, Talib Kweli)
- 08. "Focused On The M´s" (feat. Termanology, Flee Lord)
- 09. "Big Shit" (feat. Lukah, UFO Fev)
- 10. "Generational Wealth" (feat. Lord Sko, CJ Fly)
- 11. "In Memory Of" (feat. TF, Cal Wayne)
- 12. "Speak Easy" (feat. Grafh, Neek da Skittz)
- 13. "Vegas Nights" (feat. Smoke DZA, Wais P)
- 14. "Down For You" (feat. Haile Supreme)
- 15. "All Night Thing" (feat. Jinell, Sam Jay)

== 2024 ==
=== Kota the Friend – Lyrics To Go Vol. 5 ===
- 09. "Vienna"

=== Sonnyjim ===
- 00. "Chun King"

=== Rook Director ===
- 00. "Credentials" (feat. Stalley)

=== Statik Selektah ===
- 00. "Bleed Green (Showoff Celtics Anthem)" (feat. Termanology, JFK, Ea$y Money, Reks)

=== Termanology - The Summer Pack 2 ===
- 03. "Smooth Criminal" (feat. Lord Sko)

=== Lord Sko ===
- 00. "Lesson Learned"

=== Jae Skeese - Ground Level ===
- 02. "Peter Parker"

=== Ankhlejohn - Pride Of A Man ===
- 13. "Knowledge Born"

=== Termanology - Professional Smoke ===
- 02. "Professional Smoke" (feat. Planet Asia)
- 06. "I Know" (feat. Nym K., Skyzoo)
- 07. "Get With It" (feat. Grafh)

=== Che Noir - The Lotus Child ===
- 06. "Angels" (feat. Souly Ghost)

=== Termanology & Tek - Teknology ===
- 02. "Teknology"
- 07. "She´s Got A Thing For Me" (feat. 5ive Mics)
- 12. "Toe To Toe"

=== Reuben Vincent ===
- 00. "Bishop Dance" (feat. Marco Plus)

=== Bun B & Statik Selektah - TrillStatik 4 ===
- 01. "Live From Houston" (feat. DJ Premier, Harley Harl)
- 02. "Trillselda 2" (feat. Westside Gunn, Conway The Machine, Boldy James)
- 03. "Out The Mud" (feat. Paul Wall, Maxo Kream, T.F.)
- 04. "Rollin" (feat. Le$, K-Len, Lil Keke)
- 05. "Timbs In H-Town" (feat. Neek Da Skittz, Termanology, Grafh)
- 06. "The Procedure" (feat. GP of 4/5, Propain)
- 07. "Double Cup" (feat. Lord Sko, Buddy Roe)
- 08. "Reputation" (feat. Flash Is Hip Hop, Tek)
- 09. "Forever" (feat. Killa Kyleon)
- 10. "Cooley High" (feat. Big Tony, Cal Wayne, Hot Boy Skeeta)
- 11. "God´s Favorites" (feat. JFK)
- 12. "Sons Of A Pimp" (feat. SK, Worldwide, Yung Pimp)

=== Kota the Friend - Once In A Blue Moon ===
- 01. "Bacon, Egg And Cheese"
- 02. "BLAH" (feat. Logic)
- 03. "How It Is"
- 04. "Let It Go"
- 05. "Free My Dogs"
- 06. "Northside"
- 07. "What You Need" (feat. Phearnone)
- 08. "Mr. Mellow"
- 09. "Get It Done"
- 10. "Count Your Days"

== 2025 ==
=== Jim Jones – At The Church Steps ===
- 01. "JOMO (Jump Off My AYOO)"

=== Nems – America´s Sweetheart ===
- 05. "2 Live & Die In NY"

=== JFK ===
- 00. "Out For The Win" (feat. Lunden Benard, Dillon)

=== Def Soulja – RAS ===
- 02. "Methodology"

=== Recoechi ===
- 00. "Walking Temple"

=== Ea$y Money & Phinelia – Drug Money ===
- 09. "Unforgiven"

=== Statik Selektah ===
- 00. "The Louvre" (feat. Westside Gunn, Joey Bada$$, Rome Streetz, Stove God Cooks)

=== Lord Sko – Piff ===
- 02. "Second Thought"

=== Rosco P. Coldchain ===
- 00. "U.A.P."

=== Lukah & Statik Selektah - A Lost Language Found ===
- 01. "Words Drenched in Acid"
- 02. "South Still Speaking" (feat. Killer Mike)
- 03. "Broadcasting"
- 04. "Mirror Discussions"
- 05. "Native Tongues"
- 06. "Shredded Speech" (feat. Bun B)
- 07. "Talk Of…"
- 08. "Strange Slanguistics" (feat. Termanology)
- 09. "Concrete Idioms" (feat. Passport Rav & Propain)
- 10. "Wine Glass Remarks" (feat. Jay Worthy)
- 11. "A Love Language" (feat. Evryday Saints)
- 12. "Monologue 4 My Doggs" (feat. Stooky Bros & Evryday Saints)
- 13. "My Sermon" (feat. 8Ball)
- 14. "Power Dialogue" (feat. Adajyo)

=== Thirstin Howl III - The Last Shall Be The Thirst ===
- 07. "Our Mama MGV" (feat. Rebecca Billips)

=== Nim K. - Queen Of The Misfits ===
- 03. "Silky Smooth"

=== Statik Selektah - Mahalo 3 ===
- 01. "Aloha Morn"
- 02. "Exotic Mart"
- 03. "Tricky Mick"
- 04. "Dirty Souls"
- 05. "Nobody Zzz"
- 06. "Everything Changes"
- 07. "Sometimes Forever"
- 08. "Bright Blue"
- 09. "Hideout Dreamin"
- 10. "You´re Good"
- 11. "Baby Won´t"
- 12. "Aloha Got Soul!"

=== Joey Bada$$ - Lonely at the Top ===
- 06. "BK‘s Finest" (feat. Rome Streetz, Kai Ca$h, CJ Fly)
- 10. "Still" (feat. Ab-Soul, Rapsody)

=== The Musalini & Wais P - Choose Or Lose ===
- 01. "Can A Player Live" (feat. Izzy Hot)
- 02. "Return Of The Mack"
- 03. "How To Knocka"
- 04. "Live In The Flesh"
- 05. "4 Real" (feat. Planet Asia)
- 06. "Cashmere Coast" (feat. Planet Asia)
- 07. "Sake Bombs"
- 08. "Pimpin Saved" (feat. Pimpin Ken)

=== Shaykh Hanif - The Hand That Feeds ===
- 07. "Older Than My Heroes"

=== Slaine - A New State Of Grace ===
- 01. "A New State Of Grace"
- 02. "Cancel Culture" (feat. Ill Bill)
- 03. "Listen Up"
- 04. "Ambition Of The Crown" (feat. Millyz)
- 05. "It‘s All Good"
- 06. "Ain’t Been The Same" (feat. Haile Supreme)
- 07. "Coka Grillz" (feat. Ill Bill, Paul Wall)
- 08. "Crumbled God" (feat. Rasheed Chappell, Termanology)
- 09. "The Real Sh!t" (feat. O.C., Masta Ace)
- 10. "Gusto" (feat. OT The Real, Kxng Crooked)
- 11. "World Don’t Stop"

=== Bun B & Statik Selektah - TrillStatik 5 ===
- 01. "You´re Mine" (feat. Busta Rhymes)
- 02. "Crooklyn 25" (feat. Talib Kweli, Nems)
- 03. "Junk Yard Dogs" (feat. Bone Crusher)
- 04. "Trill Man Dem" (feat. Yaadcore, Friyie)
- 05. "Before The Storm" (feat. Neek Da Skittz)
- 06. "Still At It" (feat. Talib Kweli)
- 07. "Let Me Know" (feat. Termanology, Tony Sunshine)
- 08. "To The Ceiling" (feat. Premo Rice, Robb Banks, Billie Essco)
- 09. "Evening Prayer" (feat. Recoechi, Billie Essco)
- 10. "Bringing Polo Back" (feat. Propain, GP 4/5, Oti$)
- 11. "1 Time 4 Da 5th Outro" (feat. JFK)

== 2026 ==
=== Errol Eats Everything ===
- 00. "Round N Round (Statik Selektah Remix)" (feat. Rome Streetz)

=== Coyote – Machetes And Micheladas ===
- 01. "APEXzibit Intro" (feat. Xzibit)
- 02. "Give Me A Hell Yeah" (feat. Conway the Machine)
- 03. "No Rest For The Whicked"
- 04. "Whippin' Cream" (feat. Psycho Realm)
- 05. "Blasphemy"
- 06. "Love Me Love Me Not" (feat. Alicia Marie)
- 07. "Shoebox Interlude"
- 08. "Shoebox Money" (feat. Sirrealist)
- 09. "Nothing Changes If Nothing Changes" (feat. Curren$y)
- 10. "Letter To My Son" (feat. Berner)
- 11. "Cali Dreaming" (feat. John Solo)
- 12. "Welcome To America Interlude"
- 13. "What‘s Peace?" (feat. Locksmith, R.A. the Rugged Man)
- 14. "Kid Name Johnny"
- 15. "I.D.K."
- 16. "Cortez On My Feet" (feat. Lil Mr. E)
- 17. "Fuck Everybody" (feat. Daylit)
- 18. "Church"
- 19. "Huff & Puff"

=== Dax Mpire ===
- 00. "Like The Love"

=== Raekwon ===
- 00. "Glenfiddich Freestyle"

=== Termanology & Royal Flush - Royal Terms ===
- 01. "Terms Of Royalty"

=== AZ - Doe or Die III ===
- 07. "Still Jackie"
- 11. "I Was Once There Too"

=== Lord Sko - Elevator Music ===
- 01. "Elevator Music"
- 02. "How It Is"
- 03. "Better Days" (feat. Dave East)
- 04. "Northern Lights" (feat. B-Real, Smoke DZA)
- 05. "Drunk Dial" (feat. Ab-Soul)
- 06. "Hangman"
- 07. "Donnie Brasko"
- 08. "Wonder"
- 09. "N.W.O." (feat. Andre Lawrence, Rhakim Ali, Lifeofthom, Kai Ca$h, Marco Plus)
- 10. "Wish Upon A Star"

=== Nina Sky ===
- 00. "I‘m Hot"

=== Paul Wall & Termanology - Repeat Repeat Repeat ===
- 02. "Feeling" (feat. Bun B)
- 03. "Blessings" (feat. Masspike Miles)
- 07. "Repeat Repeat Repeat"
- 08. "Pray For The Weak" (feat. Nems, Haile Supreme)

=== The Game - The Documentary III ===
- 21. "The Pen"

=== JFK ===
- 00. "Same Kids" (feat. Termanology, Paul Wall, Wade Barber)

=== Flash Garments ===
- 00. "House Hold Names"

=== Statik Selektah - Expensive Taste ===
- 01. "Rose Tinted" (feat. AZ, Boldy James, Ab-Soul, Bruiser Wolf)
- 02. "Generational" (feat. Styles P, Killer Mike, Termanology)
- 03. "Eye Shine" (feat. Busta Rhymes, Smif-N-Wessun, Nina Sky)
- 04. "Champagne Wishes" (feat. Ab-Soul, Raekwon, Freddie Gibbs)
- 05. "No Time Soon" (feat. 2 Chainz)
- 06. "Growing Pains" (feat. Joey Bada$$)
- 07. "Kings County" (feat. Nems, M.O.P.)
- 08. "365" (feat. Paul Wall, Kai Ca$h, Smoke DZA)
- 09. "Real Player Baby" (feat. The Cool Kids, Rome Streetz, Jay Worthy)
- 10. "Globetrotters" (feat. Lord Sko, Logic)
- 11. "Good Vino" (feat. Crimeapple, Monday Night)
- 12. "Choose Life" (feat. G-Eazy)
- 13. "Is That You" (feat. Bruiser Wolf, Wiki, Chris Crack)
- 14. "Crown Of Thorns" (feat. Coyote, Dirty Sanchez 47)
- 15. "Northside" (feat. Northside Lord)
- 16. "Tooth 4 Tooth" (feat. Termanology, UFO Fev, Reks, Lord Sko, JFK, Coyote, Ea$y Money)
- 17. "I Tried" (feat. Brother Tom Sos, Kota the Friend)
- 18. "Ain´t So Far" (feat. Cordae, Harley Harl)
- 19. "The Louvre" (feat. Westside Gunn, Rome Streetz, Joey Bada$$, Stove God Cooks)
- 20. "The Red Carpet" (feat. Pharoahe Monch)
- 21. "Where Did The Shroom Guy Go" (feat. Hannibal Buress)

=== OT The Real – There Will Be Blood ===
- 06. "SSR" (feat. Reason, Grafh)

=== Termanology & Jon Connor – Break Bread ===
- 03. "All We Know" (feat. Reks)

=== 2 Chainz - P.O.L.O. ===
- 01. "Bigga Rankin (P.O.L.O. Radio)"
- 02. "Special" (feat. Mary J Blige)
- 03. "Walk" (feat. T.I.)
- 04. "Reign" (feat. Cash Cobain, Young Nudy)
- 05. "Tell Me You Sorry" (feat. Vory)
- 06. "Mirror" (feat. Leon Thomas)
- 07. "A Week In Paris"
- 08. "Situation" (feat. Big Sean, Erykah Badu, Aasher Saintt)
- 09. "21 Bridges" (feat. The-Dream, Ronald Isley)
- 10. "Strong" (feat. Macy Gray, Westside Gunn)
- 11. "Just Say That"
- 12. "Anything You Want" (feat. Muni Long, 6lack)
- 13. "Kenmore"
- 14. "Controlled Substance"
- 15. "Versace Robe" (feat. Dolla Boy)
- 16. "Highlight Real"
- 17. "Monsta" (feat. CeeLo Green)
- 18. "Pops"

=== 2Dead Boyz (Meechy Darko & Zombie Juice) - NO1LIVES4EVER ===
- 01. "Tortured Soul"

=== Kurupt & Hus Kingpin - Kingpin's Theory ===
- 05. "Statik Kings"
