= Still Blue =

Studio album by Jared Evan & Statik Selektah
- Released: October 28, 2014
- Recorded: 2014
- Genre: R&B; Hip hop
- Length: 31:19
- Label: Showoff; Jared Evan
- Producer: Statik Selektah

Jared Evan chronology
Pieces (2013)	Still Blue (2014)	The Art Form of Whatever (2015)

Statik Selektah chronology
What Goes Around (2014)	Still Blue (2014)	Lucky 7 (2015)

Singles from Still Blue
- 1. "Outside" Released: September 16, 2014; 2. "Moneyball" Released: October 28, 2014

Still Blue is the second collaborative studio album by American singer-songwriter Jared Evan and producer Statik Selektah. The project was released on October 28, 2014. The album features guest appearances by Michael Christmas, Nyck Caution, Dessy Hinds and Ransom.

External videos
- Jared Evan & Statik Selektah – Still Blue (October 1, 2014)
- Jared Evan & Statik Selektah – Scene (October 22, 2014)
- Jared Evan & Statik Selektah – The Background (November 18, 2014)
- Jared Evan & Statik Selektah – Bass Is Low (Starring Taryn Manning) (February 25, 2015)

== Track listing ==
All songs produced by Statik Selektah.

No.	Title	Length
1.	"Still Blue"	2:07
2.	"Scene"	3:32
3.	"Baggage Claim" (featuring Michael Christmas)	3:24
4.	"Moneyball" (featuring Nyck Caution and Dessy Hinds)	2:42
5.	"When in Rome"	3:39
6.	"The Background"	2:59
7.	"Bass Is Low"	3:51
8.	"Outside" (featuring Ransom)	3:06
9.	"Layover"	3:46
10.	"No One Else"	2:13
