= The Blanket Truth =

Studio album by Jared Evan
- Released: November 4, 2016
- Recorded: 2014–16
- Genre: Alternative pop; soul; hip hop; R&B
- Length: 38:56
- Label: Jared Evan Inc.; The Orchard; Sony
- Producer: Jared Evan; The Arcitype; !llmind; Ill Factor; Mike Derenzo

Jared Evan chronology
The Art Form of Whatever (2015)	The Blanket Truth (2016)

Singles from The Blanket Truth
- 1. "Kids Forever" Released: October 13, 2015; 2. "Role Model" Released: October 6, 2016; 3. "Big Brother" Released: October 14, 2016; 4. "The End Game" Released: October 28, 2016

The Blanket Truth is the debut studio album by American singer-songwriter and producer Jared Evan. The album was released on November 4, 2016 by Sony Music Entertainment.

External videos
- Jared Evan – Kids Forever (August 4, 2016)
- Jared Evan – Role Model (October 6, 2016)

== Background ==
The album concept was based on a scene from the film I Heart Huckabees. It touches upon the idea that everything in the world is somehow connected, with time and space being a main theme throughout the album. It includes guest appearances from Allan Kingdom and Lloyd, and features production from Jared Evan, The Arcitype, !llmind, Ill Factor and Mike Derenzo.

== Singles ==
On October 12, 2015 the first single from the album, "Kids Forever" was released. The song met great success, garnering millions of streams via YouTube and Spotify combined. Because of this, Jared later released the official music video for the single on August 4, 2016. On October 6, 2016, he released the second single "Role Model". The official music video for the single was released on the same day. On October 14, 2016, he released the third single "Big Brother" and on October 28, 2016, he released the fourth and final single "The End Game" featuring Allan Kingdom.

== Track listing ==
No.	Title	Producer	Length
1.	"Role Model"	Jared Evan	4:49
2.	"Kids Forever"	Jared Evan	3:53
3.	"The End Game" (featuring Allan Kingdom)	The Arcitype	3:06
4.	"Revive Me"	The Arcitype	4:04
5.	"Hourglass" (featuring Lloyd)	Jared Evan	4:06
6.	"Cry"	!llmind	3:43
7.	"Big Brother"	!llmind; Jared Evan	3:43
8.	"Slow Rain"	Ill Factor	3:23
9.	"The Blanket Truth"	Jared Evan; Mike Derenzo	4:39
10.	"Temporary"	Mike Derenzo	3:30
Total length:			38:56
