= Kota the Friend =

American rapper from New York

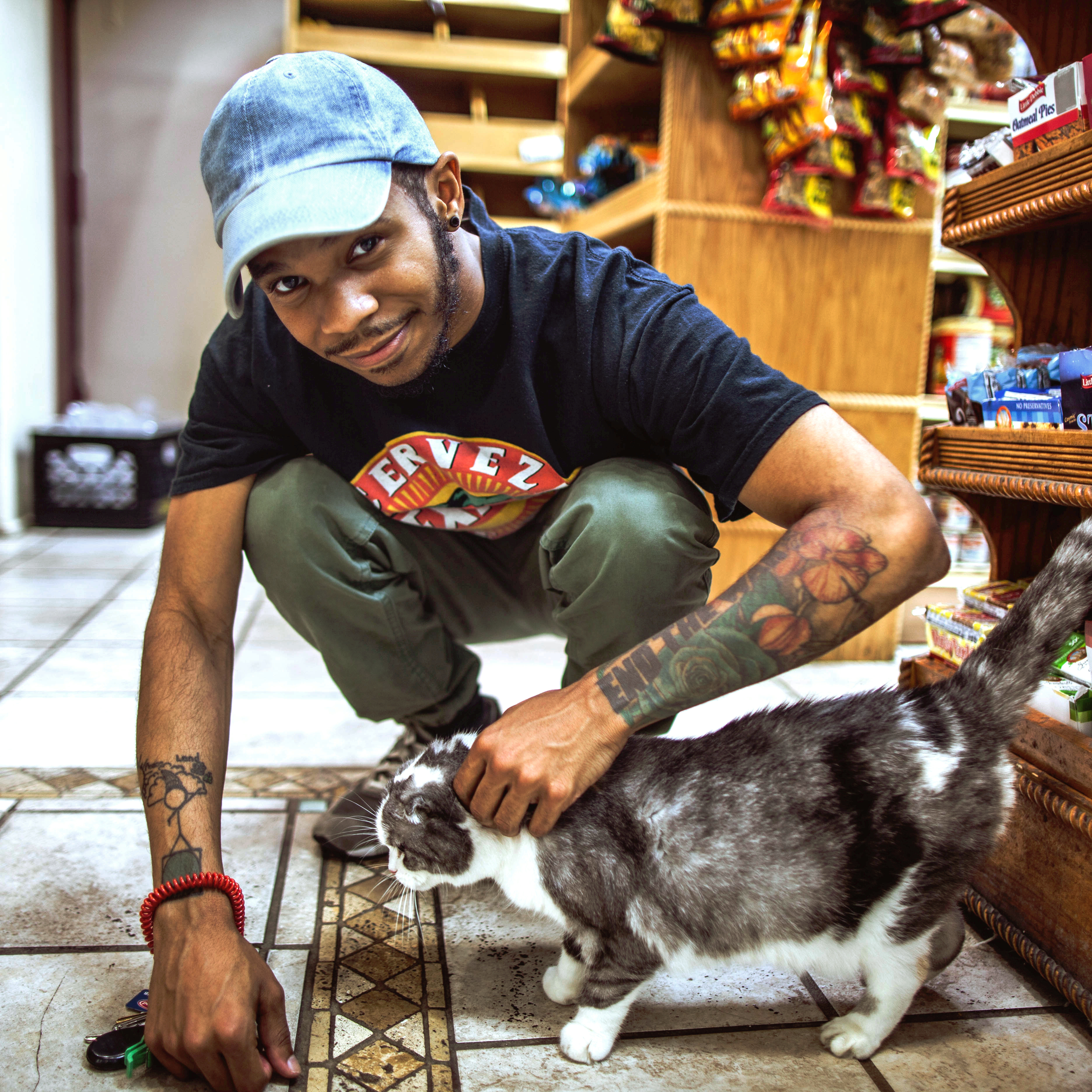
- Kota the Friend in 2017

Background information
- Born: Avery Marcel Joshua Jones; October 16, 1992 (age 33); New York City, U.S.
- Genres: Hip hop; East Coast hip hop
- Occupations: Rapper; singer; songwriter; record producer; videographer
- Years active: 2015–present
- Label: FLTBYS
- Website: kotathefriend.com

Avery Marcel Joshua Jones (born October 16, 1992), known by his stage name Kota the Friend (stylized as KOTA The Friend), is an American rapper, singer, songwriter, and record producer, born and raised in Brooklyn, New York. He took his stage name from the Disney movie Brother Bear and has claimed it is a Native American word meaning friend.

== Early life ==
Avery Jones was born on October 16, 1992, in Brooklyn, New York City. Growing up as a Jehovah's Witness in Clinton Hill, Brooklyn, he developed an affinity for music. Jones at 8 years of age learned how to play the trumpet although he originally wanted to play the saxophone but there were not enough available at his school, later picking up the keyboard, guitar, and bass. He attended the Brooklyn High School of the Arts and Five Towns College for trumpet. During college, he created the rap trio Nappy Hair, releasing two mixtapes, "Autumn", and "Nappy Hair." Kota spent much of his time working weekend jobs to make enough money to build an at-home music studio. Jones in his early teen years recalls rapping into his laptop in the bathroom. This encouraged him to continue to pursue creating music as a career.

== Career ==
Kota the Friend has remained an independent act throughout his career—turning down 3 major record labels; instead, creating his own label and apparel store FLTBYS. He frequently cites a do-it-yourself mentality, such as filming his own music videos, recording within a home setup, and producing most of his discography. His mentality was fueled by a desire for freedom and to avoid the sense of musical confinement.

In his debut studio album FOTO, Kota featured appearances from artists Saba and Hello O'shay. Focusing on mellow and jazzy beats, it was praised by many for its quality and attention to detail. FOTO was ranked the 17th best hip-hop album of 2019 by Rolling Stone. He subsequently embarked on his first headlining tour, called the FOTO Tour.

His second studio album, EVERYTHING, featured appearances from notable artists such as Joey Badass, Bas, and KYLE, among others. In addition, he featured actress Lupita Nyong'o and actor Lakeith Stanfield in interludes. The album went on to peak at number 162 on the Billboard 200, becoming his first album to chart. The album received positive reception from fans, but was not picked up by any major review outlets at the time.

Kota's third studio album, MEMO, was released in July 2022 with only two features, the returning Hello O'shay and singer Brianna Castro.

Kota was featured in the Prof song Lionhearted, which was released on September 26, 2025.

== Business ventures ==
Kota the Friend owns FLTBYS (pronounced Flight Boys), a skate, music and travel culture brand, which he started when he was a student in the 11th grade in Brooklyn, New York. Kota has been making clothes since a young age.

He purchased a building in Midtown Harrisburg, Pennsylvania, in 2020, which houses his FLTBYS retail store on the ground floor.

== Critique ==
Nick Sligh gives a detailed critique of Kota the Friend's album "To Kill a Sunrise." This album is a collaboration with producer Statik Selektah, who Sligh claims "challenge Kota to push new boundaries in his artistry." He gives the album as a whole a score of 75/100. Sligh's favorite songs include, "Sunrise," "Hate," "Go Now," and "The Cold." Matt Jost also critiques Kota the Friend's "To Kill a Sunrise" album. He highlights on the fact that Kota began the album with the song "Wolves" to stray away from the repetition expressed in previous album to signify how he has grown as an artist and the lessons he has learned during his career. Jost touches on how Kota wrote the song "Go Now" to represent how he allows those around him to mistreat him. Jost also mentions Kota can improve on the songs themselves, but excels in setting the mood for the song. Overall, there was a good perception of the album, "To Kill a Sunrise" based on these critiques.

== Personal life ==
In a Genius interview, Kota the Friend cited Jay-Z, Nasty C, Kid Cudi, Bob Dylan, The Beatles and others as musical influences.

Kota the Friend has one son.

Kota practices veganism periodically to cleanse himself and put himself in a better mindset.

== Discography ==
=== Studio albums ===
Title	Details	Peak chart positions	
Title	Details	US	
Title	Details	Billboard 200	Album Sales
Anything.	Released: February 15, 2018; Label: FLTBYS; Formats: Digital download, streaming	—	—
FOTO	Released: May 15, 2019; Label: FLTBYS; Formats: Digital download, streaming	—	—
Lyrics to Go Vol.1	Released: January 20, 2020; Label: FLTBYS; Formats: Digital download, streaming	—	—
EVERYTHING	Released: May 22, 2020; Label: FLTBYS; Formats: Digital download, streaming	162	31
Lyrics to Go Vol.2	Released: January 18, 2021; Label: FLTBYS; Formats: Digital download, streaming	—	—
To Kill a Sunrise (with Statik Selektah)	Released: March 19, 2021; Label: FLTBYS; Formats: Digital download, streaming	—	—
Lyrics to Go Vol.3	Released: January 14, 2022; Label: FLTBYS; Formats: Digital download, streaming	—	—
MEMO	Released: July 8, 2022; Label: FLTBYS; Formats: Digital download, streaming	—	—
Lyrics to Go Vol.4	Released: January 18, 2023; Label: FLTBYS; Formats: Digital download, streaming	—	—
To See a Sunset (with Statik Selektah)	Released: March 24, 2023; Label: FLTBYS; Formats: Digital download, streaming	—	—
Protea	Released: June 30, 2023; Label: FLTBYS; Formats: Digital download, streaming, CD, Vinyl	—	—
Lyrics to Go Vol.5	Released: January 25, 2024; Label: FLTBYS; Formats: Digital download, streaming	—	—
Once In A Blue Moon	Released: December 13, 2024; Label: FLTBYS; Formats: Digital download, streaming	—	—
NO RAP ON SUNDAY	Released: June 27, 2025; Label: FLTBYS; Formats: Digital download, streaming, CD, Vinyl	—	—
LOCAL ART DEALER, Vol.1	Released: June 27, 2025; Label: FLTBYS; Formats: Digital download, streaming	—	—

== Music in film ==
Kota's song titled "Scapegoat" was used for the entire end credit in the Amazon Prime movie Emergency (2022). His song "Pomegranate" was used in the Netflix movie You People (2023), which starred Eddie Murphy, Jonah Hill, Nia Long, Julia Louis-Dreyfus. His song titled Volvo was featured in Netflix original, Survival of the Thickest.
