= Gorilla Nems =

American rapper

Nems
- Born: Travis Doyle; December 21, 1982 (age 43); Coney Island, Brooklyn, New York
- Genres: Hip hop
- Occupations: Rapper, content creator, entrepreneur

Travis Doyle, commonly known as Gorilla Nems or simply Nems, is an American rapper, content creator, entrepreneur and web series host, from Coney Island, Brooklyn, New York City. Known for his appearance on MTV2's Fight Klub, catchphrase "Bing Bong", and Don't Ever Disrespect Me series, he is also founder and owner of the Brooklyn-based brand, Fuck Your Lyfe (FYL).

After winning MC battle competitions in New York City, he appeared in MTV2's Fight Klub league in 2006, where he recorded the most wins (25 wins) by any MC in the league's history.

Nems again rose to fame in 2021, when his catchphrases "Bing Bong" and clips of him interviewing people in Coney Island, went viral on TikTok. Over half a million videos used original sounds from different clips of his interviews, and clips with the #bingbong hashtag have over a billion views on social media.

== Personal life ==
Travis Doyle was born on December 21, 1982, in Coney Island, Brooklyn, where he grew up with his mom in O’Dwyer Gardens housing projects. On March 15, 2024, he converted to Islam.

== Career ==
Nems started his career in early 2000s with battle raps. At the time, he won numerous MC battle competitions in New York City, like EOW and Braggin’ Rites. In 2006, he appeared on MTV2's Fight Klub league, where he recorded the most wins by any MC in league history. He won a total of 25 battles in Fight Klub league.

After his appearance on MTV2, he released numerous mixtapes– FYL Valium Won, Free Nems, and FYL Valium Too– signed to an indie label Psycho+Logical-Records, and toured the United States. In 2008, he released another mixtape, Super Marvelous, after which he joined Creative Juices Music to record his debut album, Prezident's Day (released in 2010). Since then he has released many albums and EPs, including Filthy Fly Shit, Coney Soprano, Broke Safety, Fuck Your Love, Gorilla, The Planet Of The Apes series, and Skinny Nems. In 2019, he released his second album "Gorilla Monsoon", with 14 tracks. He then released "Bamboo" in 2020, and "Congo" in 2021.

Nems has collaborated with many notable artists such as Fat Joe, Styles P, Ghostface Killah, Kool G Rap, Ill Bill, Sean Price, Jedi Mind Tricks, Termanology, Statik Selektah, Torae and D12. Nems has also been featured on various notable works, including two tracks of Ghostface's 2014 album 36 Seasons and La Coka Nostra’s 2016 album To Thine Own Self Be True. Furthermore in a special episode, Rap City '21, popular rapper Fat Joe called Nems to be "the next Fat Joe".

=== Bing Bong ===
Nems created the catchphrase "Bing Bong" in early 2021, while showing off his new merchandise on the social media. The term became viral when he used it while hosting an episode of Sidetalk. It was further popularized by the viral "Bing Bong" trend on TikTok where users would recreate various different quotes from Sidetalk. Celebrities including President Joe Biden, The Jonas Brothers, John Legend, Lil Nas X, Olivia Rodrigo, Jack Harlow, and Avril Lavigne joined in on the trend. Over half a million videos used original sounds from different clips of his interviews, and clips with the #bingbong hashtag have over 1 billion views on TikTok.
