= Marlon Craft =

American rapper, singer, and songwriter (born 1993)

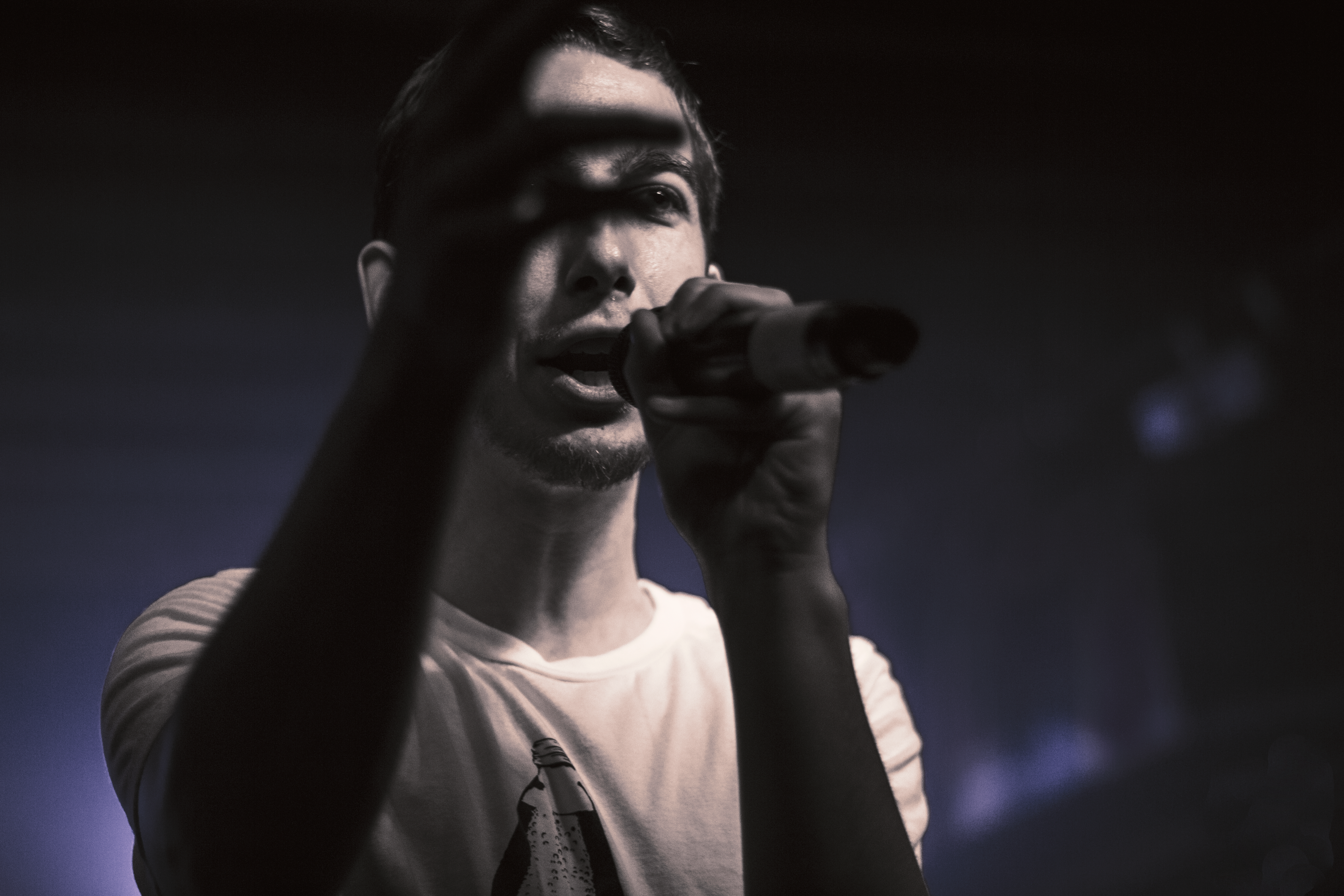
- Craft performing in Toronto, Ontario (2018)

Background information
- Born: February 27, 1993 (age 33); Manhattan, New York, U.S.
- Origin: Hell's Kitchen
- Genre: Hip-hop
- Occupations: Rapper; songwriter
- Instrument: Vocals
- Years active: 2015–present
- Label: Independent
- Website: marloncraft.com

Marlon Craft is an American rapper and songwriter from Manhattan, New York. He released his debut studio album, Funhouse Mirror, in June 2019. He had also previously released numerous EPs and mixtapes.

== Early life and education ==
Marlon Craft was born in Hell's Kitchen in Manhattan. His father is a jazz drummer and his mother is a producer for an Off-Broadway theater company. He grew up in Manhattan Plaza, a Mitchell-Lama residential complex in Hell's Kitchen. He attended The Beacon School, a selective college-preparatory high school also in Hell's Kitchen. He also played AAU basketball in the South Bronx. After high school, Craft attended American University in Washington, D.C. where he designed his own major, Urban Education and Social Justice.

== Career ==
After college, Craft moved back to Manhattan Plaza and began making freestyle videos and posting them to YouTube. His first collection of songs came in the form of the March 2015 mixtape, Pieces. That project featured a freestyle in which Craft rapped over the beat from "Shook Ones" by Mobb Deep. He followed that with two EPs in 2016: So, What Are You Doing? and he looked like nothing. The latter project featured the single, "Workin'". In March 2017, Craft released a short film that was also called he looked like nothing. The month prior, he was featured in a cypher at Audiomack Studios with Radamiz and Angelo Mota.

In August 2017, Craft released his second mixtape, The Tunnel's End, which featured the singles "The Feels" and "New York Shit" (featuring Radamiz). The album was briefly number 2 on the iTunes Hip-Hop chart behind Jay-Z's 4:44. He also continued releasing freestyles including one that mentioned every NBA team, another on Statik Selektah's Shade 45 radio show, and one that mentioned every member of the 2016 and 2017 XXL Freshman classes. In 2018, Craft opened for Dizzy Wright on his "Golden State of Mind Tour". He also released a series of EPs entitled A Dollar in Quarters. 25c came out in February, 50c in March, and 75c in May.

Later in 2018, Craft partnered with Same Plate Entertainment (a joint venture with Sony Music). One of the first singles he released after signing to Same Plate was "NY Baby" featuring Bodega Bamz. In November 2018, he was featured on the Masta Ace and Marco Polo album, A Breukelen Story, on the track "Wanna Be". In 2019, Craft and his team formed an art collective, movement, and lifestyle brand called "OUR.S". The organization helped coordinate "WORKWEEK", a series of public events in March and April 2019 that highlighted various non-profit organizations. Craft released the single "Do The Work" in support of the WORKWEEK events.

In May 2019, Craft released another single, "Shallow", featuring Dizzy Wright. As part of OUR.S, fans could access the song two days before its wide release. In June 2019, Craft released the single "Gang Shit". The song and its accompanying music video depicted Craft taking on three roles: a racist white police officer, a member of the Ku Klux Klan, and a black man serving prison time for an armed robbery.

The song served as the lead single to his debut studio album, Funhouse Mirror, which was released later that month by Same Plate and Sony. The album featured guest appearances from Dizzy Wright, Nyck Caution, Ricky Motion, and Evan Crommett. It reached number one on iTunes' Top Hip-Hop Albums chart the week it was released. It also received praise from artists and activists like Killer Mike, T.I., Shaun King, and La La Anthony. Shortly after the album's release, Craft sold out his first show headlining at SOB's in New York. The following month, he held a listening party at The Halal Guys food carts on 53rd Street in Manhattan. In July 2019, he appeared on Sway in the Morning and performed a "5 Fingers of Death" freestyle.

In 2020 Craft left his record deal with Same Plate Entertainment/Sony Music and went back fully independent, launching The Center - an exclusive online subscription community of supporters. For $7 a month, fans can directly fund the creation of Craft's content, and in return receive exclusive access in the forms of hidden songs, weekly Zoom sessions, and more.

In early 2021, Craft announced that his second album, How We Intended would release in February. On January 19, a day before Joe Biden's inauguration as president, Craft released "State of the Union", a scathing rebuke of the state of affairs in America and in culture. On January 22, he appeared on The Beat with Ari Melber on MSNBC to break down the video and song with Ari Melber and Michael Steele.

== Discography ==
=== Studio albums ===
List of studio albums with selected details
Title	Details
Funhouse Mirror	Released: June 17, 2019 (US); Label: Same Plate/Sony; Formats: Digital download
How We Intended	Released: February 10, 2021 (US); Label: Self-released; Formats: Digital download
While We're Here	Released: May 22, 2022; Label: Self-released
The Internet Killed the Neighborhood	Release Date: April 2, 2026; Label: Soulspazm; Formats: Digital download

=== Mixtapes ===
List of mixtapes with selected details
Title	Details
Pieces	Released: March 29, 2015 (US); Label: Self-released; Formats: Digital download
The Tunnel's End	Released: August 1, 2017 (US); Label: Self-released; Formats: Digital download, CD
Homecourt Advantage, Vol. 1	Released: September 21, 2021 (US); Label: Self-released
Homecourt Advantage, Vol. 2	Released: August 2, 2023 (US); Label: Self-released

=== EPs ===
List of EPs with selected details
Title	Details
so, what are you doing?	Released: March 24, 2016 (US); Label: Self-released; Formats: Digital download
he looked like nothing	Released: December 14, 2016 (US); Label: Self-released; Formats: Digital download
A Dollar in Quarters: 25c	Released: February 8, 2018 (US); Label: Self-released; Formats: Digital download
A Dollar in Quarters: 50c	Released: March 15, 2018 (US); Label: Self-released; Formats: Digital download
A Dollar in Quarters: 75c	Released: May 3, 2018 (US); Label: Self-released; Formats: Digital download
Space	Released: May 12, 2021 (US); Label: Self-released; Formats: Digital download
Space 2	Released: January 31, 2023 (US)

=== Singles ===
List of singles with selected details
Title	Year	Album
"Alive'"	2016	
"Workin'"	2016	he looked like nothing
"The Feels"	2017	The Tunnel's End
"New York Shit" (featuring Radamiz)	2017	The Tunnel's End
"Friends"	2018	A Dollar in Quarters: 50c
"Ain't With Today"	2018	A Dollar in Quarters: 75c
"Gang Shit"	2019	Funhouse Mirror
"Shallow" (featuring Dizzy Wright)	2019	Funhouse Mirror
"State of the Union"	2021	Homecourt Advantage, Vol. 1
"Bluffin"	2021	Homecourt Advantage, Vol. 1
"Julius Randle"	2021	Homecourt Advantage, Vol. 1
