= What Goes Around (Statik Selektah album) =

Studio album by Statik Selektah
- Released: August 19, 2014
- Recorded: 2013–2014
- Genre: Hip-hop, jazz rap
- Length: 67:56
- Label: Showoff; Duck Down
- Producer: Statik Selektah

Statik Selektah chronology
Extended Play (2013)	What Goes Around (2014)	Lucky 7 (2015)

What Goes Around is the sixth studio album by East Coast hip-hop producer Statik Selektah. The album was released on August 19, 2014, by Duck Down Music Inc. and Showoff Records. The album features guest appearances from Lil' Fame, Joey Badass, Freddie Gibbs, Styles P, Talib Kweli, Action Bronson, Royce da 5'9", Black Thought, Snoop Dogg, Dilated Peoples, Ab-Soul, Jon Connor, Logic, Ransom, N.O.R.E., Termanology, Reks, Sheek Louch, Pharoahe Monch, Crooked I, Heltah Skeltah, B-Real, Boldy James, Astro, and Posdnuos among others.

== Background ==
In an August 2014 interview with MTV News, Statik Selektah said the album was inspired by a March 2010 visit to one of Kanye West's My Beautiful Dark Twisted Fantasy recording sessions in Hawaii, saying: "The first beat I played him was the Nas one; Kanye sat there and listened for like 10 seconds and he pressed stop and he was like: ‘It’s cool, but jazz is dead′. I was just happy to be there, but the way he said that to me always stuck in mind. This album was definitely inspired by that."

== Critical response ==
Professional ratings
Aggregate scores
Source	Rating
Metacritic	84/100
Review scores
Source	Rating
AllMusic	4/5 stars
The Boston Globe	(positive)
Exclaim!	7/10
HipHopDX	4/5 stars
XXL	4/5 (XL)

What Goes Around received universal acclaim from music critics. At Metacritic, which assigns a weighted mean rating out of 100 to reviews from mainstream critics, the album received an average score of 84, based on 4 reviews, which indicates "universal acclaim". David Jeffries of AllMusic said, "With two production showcase albums in just one year, Statik Selektah runs the risk of spreading himself thin, but there's no evidence on that on the prime What Goes Around. From the title track/hypeman opener to the brilliant, Beach Boys-borrowing closer "God Knows" with MCs Bun B, Jared Evan, and Pos from De La Soul, this scattered, roulette wheel-spin of an album offers club cuts, throwbacks, and sullen street numbers all of top quality. The flow of it all isn't perfect, but the short runtime for the tracks and the mixtape style of butting one cut right to the next make this feel like a purposeful whirlwind." Andrew Gretchko of HipHopDX stated, "If Extended Play was Statik Selektah’s way of stating that he could compete with Hip Hop’s best, What Goes Around… is his way of letting the world know that Hip Hop’s Golden Age is alive and well. And while the compilation deejay/producer album tends to have it’s [sic] share of woes as too many cooks spoil the broth, Statik Selektah balances out this tendency with solid production that invokes images of the days of Hip Hop yore." Mark Bozzer of Exclaim! stated, "If a negative can be found in the album, it's that due to the sheer amount of different emcees all clamouring for the mic, the album lacks a cohesiveness; however, who cares about that when you can easily bounce from banger to banger on this dope record? Statik continues to bring it and this album reaffirms that."

Henry Mansell of XXL said, "Although the stellar moments heavily outweigh the flaws, criticisms surrounding Statik’s latest effort ultimately lies in the project’s length. Like so many of its predecessors, What Goes Around is a generous offering weighing in at just shy of 70 minutes delegated over 20 tracks. Yet with over 30 guest appearances, it leaves listeners somewhat fatigued and slightly agitated, hopping from artist to artist."

== Commercial performance ==
The album debuted at number 77 on the Billboard 200 chart, with first-week sales of 3,818 copies in the United States.

== Track listing ==
- All tracks produced by Statik Selektah.

No.	Title	Length
1.	"What Goes Around" (featuring Lil' Fame & Ea$y Money)	2:19
2.	"Carry On" (featuring Joey Badass & Freddie Gibbs)	3:27
3.	"The Thrill Is Back" (featuring Styles P & Talib Kweli)	2:45
4.	"The Imperial" (featuring Action Bronson, Royce Da 5'9" & Black Thought)	4:14
5.	"All the Way (Pimp Hop)" (featuring Snoop Dogg, Wais P, Ransom & CharlieRED)	3:50
6.	"Back for You" (featuring Dilated Peoples)	3:02
7.	"Alarm Clock" (featuring Ab-Soul, Jon Connor & Logic)	3:25
8.	"My Time" (featuring Black Dave, CJ Fly, Nyck Caution & Josh Xantus)	3:15
9.	"Fugazi" (featuring Sincere)	2:27
10.	"Long Time" (featuring Action Bronson)	3:32
11.	"Drunk & High" (featuring N.O.R.E., Termanology & Reks)	3:41
12.	"The Chopper" (featuring Jon Connor & Ransom)	3:08
13.	"Down Like This" (featuring Sheek Louch, Pharoahe Monch & Crooked I)	4:29
14.	"Slum Villain" (featuring Joey Badass)	2:43
15.	"Heltah Selektah" (featuring Heltah Skeltah)	2:06
16.	"Overdose" (featuring B-Real & JFK)	2:53
17.	"Something to Cry For" (featuring Boldy James)	4:01
18.	"Rise Above" (featuring Astro & Dessy Hinds)	3:26
19.	"Get Away" (featuring Joe Scudda & Colin Munroe)	3:33
20.	"God Knows" (featuring Bun B, Jared Evan & Posdnuos)	5:40
Total length:		67:56

== Charts ==
Chart (2014)	Peak position
US Billboard 200	77
US Top R&B/Hip-Hop Albums (Billboard)	14
