= Lucky 7 (Statik Selektah album) =

Studio album by Statik Selektah
- Released: July 7, 2015
- Recorded: 2015
- Genre: Hip-hop
- Length: 69:04
- Label: Showoff; Duck Down
- Producer: Statik Selektah

Statik Selektah chronology
What Goes Around (2014)	Lucky 7 (2015)	Statik KXNG (2016)

Lucky 7 is the seventh studio album by hip-hop record producer Statik Selektah. The album was released on July 7, 2015, by Duck Down Music Inc. and Showoff Records. The album features guest appearances from Rapsody, Action Bronson, Joey Badass, Your Old Droog, Chauncy Sherod, Dave East, Big K.R.I.T., Royce Da 5'9", Mick Jenkins, Smif-n-Wessun, Young M.A, Buckshot, Illa Ghee, Sean Price, Lil' Fame, Bodega Bamz, Skyzoo, Ea$y Money, Domo Genesis, Masspike Miles, Termanology, Bun B, Styles P, A$AP Twelvyy, Kirk Knight, Wais P, Jared Evan, Ab-Soul, Elle Varner, CJ Fly, Talib Kweli and Cane.

== Critical reception ==
Professional ratings
Aggregate scores
Source	Rating
Metacritic	69/100
Review scores
Source	Rating
Exclaim!	7/10
HipHopDX	4/5 stars
Pitchfork	5.0/10
XXL	(XL)

Lucky 7 received generally positive reviews from music critics. At Metacritic, which assigns a normalized rating out of 100 to reviews from mainstream critics, the album received an average score of 69 based on 6 reviews, which indicates "generally favorable reviews". Del F. Cowie of Exclaim! said, "Lucky 7 is at its best when Statik Selektah delves deep into his jazzier side as a producer, as tracks like "Beautiful Life" and "All I Need" affirm." Homer Johnsen of HipHopDX said, "If Lucky 7 truly is the end of a particular era and sound, Statik Selektah undoubtedly goes out in spectacular fashion. The beats are on point and each guest is on top of their game; no one disappoints. Lucky 7 doesn’t deviate from the framework of Statik’s previous compilations, but it does highlight his masterful command of each individual track, without ever simplifying the approach or integrity of the album." Jay Balfour of Pitchfork stated, "As a whole Lucky 7 sounds a lot like everything else Statik Selektah has done up to this point; the album is neither offputting nor particularly exciting, and it's hard to feel strongly about at all. A couple of the songs sound good enough to have just gotten cut from better solo albums, but that's not a strong selling point."

== Track listing ==
All tracks produced by Statik Selektah.

No.	Title	Length
1.	"Intro" (featuring Hannibal Buress)	1:21
2.	"Another Level" (featuring Rapsody)	3:14
3.	"Beautiful Life" (featuring Action Bronson & Joey Badass)	3:21
4.	"Hood Boogers" (featuring Your Old Droog & Chauncy Sherod)	3:22
5.	"The Locker Room" (featuring Dave East)	2:58
6.	"In the Wind" (featuring Joey Badass, Big K.R.I.T. & Chauncy Sherod)	4:01
7.	"Crystal Clear" (featuring Royce Da 5'9")	3:39
8.	"How You Feel" (featuring Mick Jenkins)	2:32
9.	"Murder Game" (featuring Smif-n-Wessun, Young M.A & Buckshot)	3:20
10.	"Gentlemen" (featuring Illa Ghee, Sean Price & Lil' Fame)	2:54
11.	"Bodega!" (featuring Bodega Bamz)	3:07
12.	"The Trophy Room" (featuring Skyzoo, Ea$y Money, Domo Genesis & Masspike Miles)	3:59
13.	"Sucker Free" (featuring JFK)	4:36
14.	"Wall Flowers" (featuring Your Old Droog, Termanology & Lord Sear)	3:20
15.	"Top Tier" (featuring Sean Price, Bun B & Styles P)	3:19
16.	"Silver Lining" (featuring A$AP Twelvyy, Kirk Knight & Chauncy Sherod)	3:20
17.	"Cold" (featuring Wais P & Jared Evan)	3:24
18.	"All You Need" (featuring Action Bronson, Ab-Soul & Elle Varner)	3:39
19.	"Scratch Off" (featuring CJ Fly, Talib Kweli & Cane)	4:43
20.	"Alone" (featuring Joey Badass)	3:31
21.	"Harley's Blues"	1:24
Total length:		69:04

== Charts ==
Chart (2015)	Peak position
US Top R&B/Hip-Hop Albums (Billboard)	47
