= Jared Evan =

American singer-songwriter (born 1989)

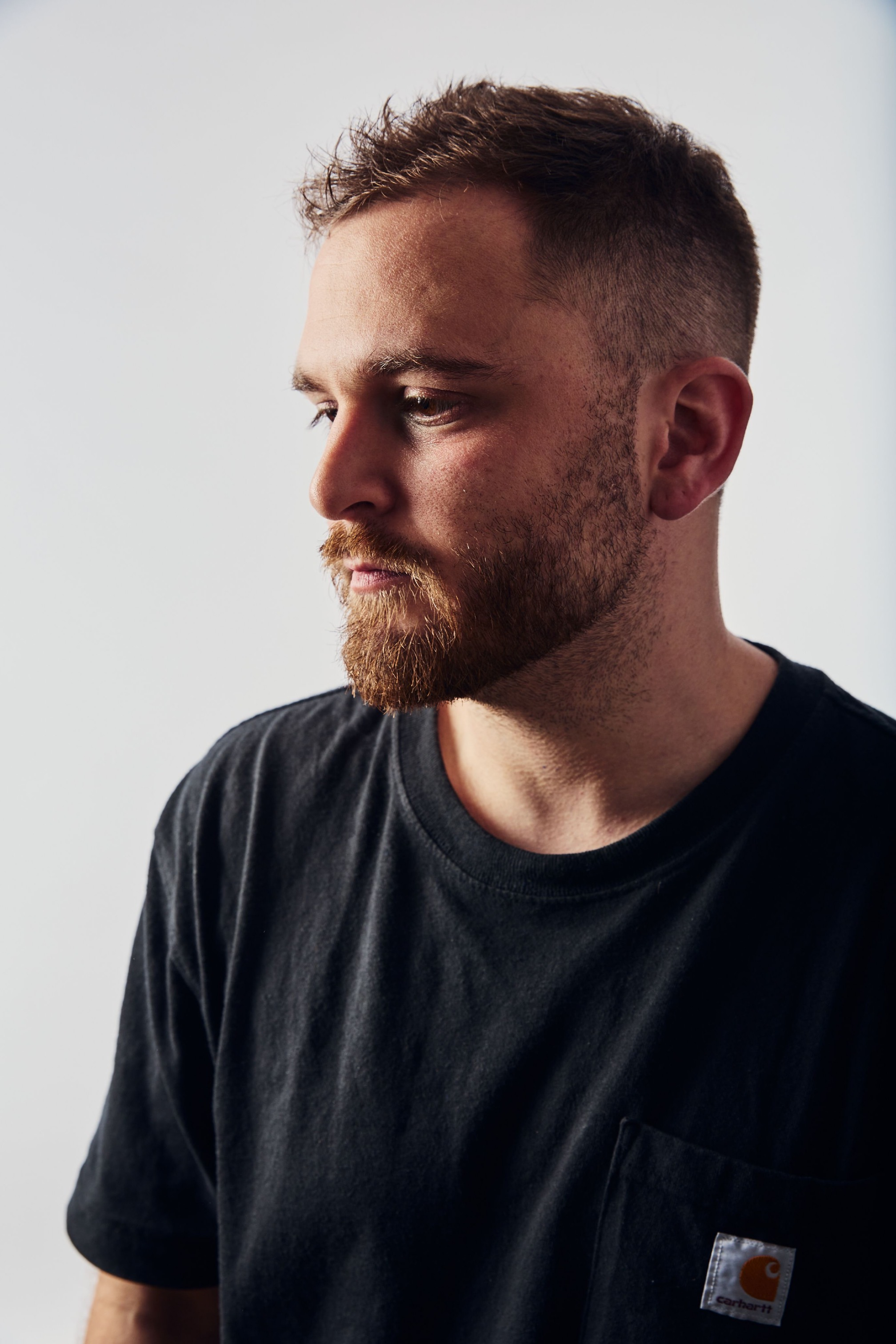
- Evan in 2022

Background information
- Born: Jared Evan Siegel; September 21, 1989 (age 36); Great Neck, New York, U.S.
- Genres: Soul; hip-hop; pop
- Occupations: Singer; songwriter; rapper; record producer
- Years active: 2010–present
- Labels: Zone 4; Interscope; EP
- Website: jaredevan.com

Jared Evan Siegel (born September 21, 1989) is an American singer-songwriter, rapper and record producer. He signed with Polow da Don's record label Zone 4, an imprint of Interscope Records, in 2009. He wrote and produced the song "Frozen" for the accompanying soundtrack to the 2009 documentary film More Than a Game. The label released his 2010 single "In Love With You".

He subsequently released two albums independently with producer Statik Selektah—Boom Bap & Blues (2013) and Still Blue (2014)—before releasing his debut studio album, The Blanket Truth (2016).

== Early life ==
Siegel grew up in Great Neck, New York. He started out by playing the drums, later becoming heavily influenced by hip-hop, alternative and R&B/soul music. Later, he focused more on producing and songwriting, and started to incorporate rap. In 2008, aged 18, he won the Brooklyn Hip Hop Festival's Spit 16 competition curated by The Source.

While working as an intern at The Fader in New York City, Siegel gave his mixtape Radio in My Head to Hip Hop director Rik Cordero. They began producing videos to Siegel's tracks, which were then circulated to music executives, leading to offers from major labels.

== Career ==
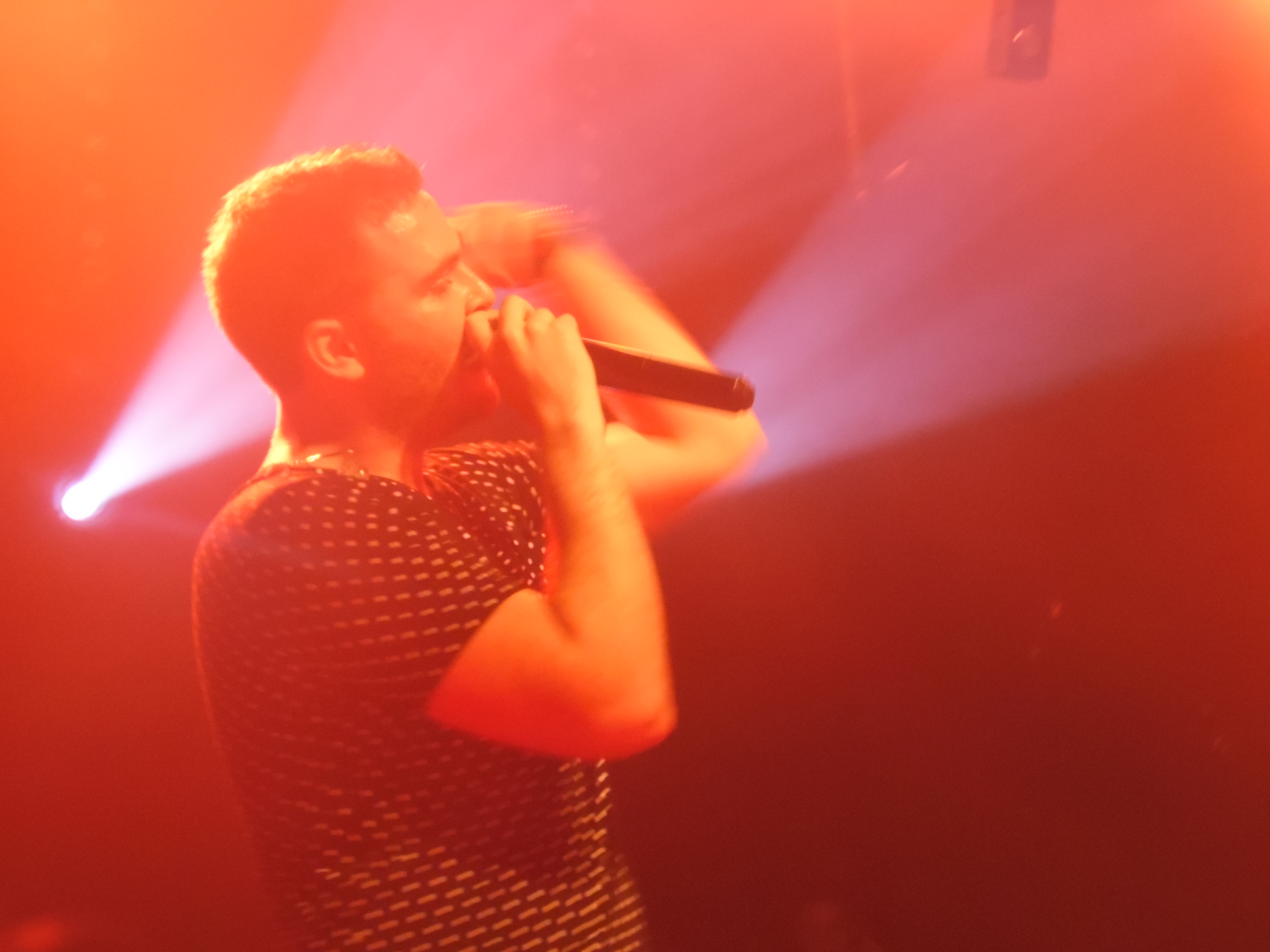
Evan performing in 2015

In June 2009, Siegel signed with Polow da Don's Zone 4/Interscope, with the support of Jimmy Iovine. In October 2009, he was featured in Billboard as an "Under the radar artist with the potential to break into the big time." Zone 4 produced the soundtrack for the documentary More than a Game, which included Siegel's track "Frozen."

In August 2010, Interscope released the single, "In Love with You". In March 2011, the song was aired on the Greek television show Radio Arvyla, and subsequently reached No. 1 on the Greek iTunes charts. During this time, Siegel worked with some of his musical influences such as The Neptunes, Dr. Dre and Mike Elizondo.

In the spring of 2011, Siegel joined OneRepublic on a nationwide tour. At the end of 2011, he opted out of his contract with Interscope, saying that they were not supporting his true vision thoroughly.

In 2012, Siegel released his debut project, The 4th Chapter, free on his website. He then co-wrote and co-produced parts of Hoodie Allen's mixtape Crew Cuts, before releasing a collaboration album with Statik Selektah, Boom Bap & Blues, on February 26, 2013, which features Joey Badass and Action Bronson. The album debuted at No. 29 on the iTunes R&B/Soul charts, and peaked at No. 8.

In 2014, Siegel produced much of Hoodie Allen's debut album People Keep Talking. One of the songs, "Numbers", which Siegel produced and co-wrote, reached No. 5 on the iTunes charts.

On November 19, 2016, Siegel released his first solo full-length album, The Blanket Truth. It peaked at No. 30 on the iTunes pop charts.

In the spring of 2019, Siegel started releasing a series of new singles, including "Permanent Damage" in March 2019, "Dark Days" in July 2019, "Perfect Strangers" in September 2019, and "Sabotage" in December 2019. In the summer of 2020, he released The Art Form of Whatever II, a sequel to his 2015 mixtape The Art Form of Whatever.

In February 2021, Siegel announced the project COLLAB, an album composed entirely of fan collaborations, which was released on March 19, 2021. In September 2021, he announced his album Dark Days, named for the title track released in 2019. The album was released on October 22, 2021.

On September 6, 2022, Siegel announced BB3 - the third sequel to his Boom Bap & Blues album with Statik Selektah. The album was released on October 14, 2022 via Siegel's label 4th Chapter Music. Most of the album was produced by Siegel himself, in collaboration with other producers.

== Musical style ==
Siegel's musical style combines soul, hip-hop, and pop with alternative rock and alternative R&B influences. He cites Bradley Nowell, The Beatles, Radiohead, Method Man, Mos Def, Al Green, RZA, DJ Premier, Stevie Wonder and Cream as his main songwriting influences.

== Discography ==
EPs

- Pieces (2013)
- Collab (2021)

Collaborative albums

- Boom Bap & Blues (with Statik Selektah) (2013)
- Still Blue (with Statik Selektah) (2014)
- BB3 (2022)

Mixtapes

- The Art Form of Whatever (2015)
- The Art Form of Whatever II (2020)
- The Art Form of Whatever III (2025)

Albums

- The 4th Chapter (2012)
- The Blanket Truth (2016)
- Dark Days (2021)
- Indigo (2024)
