= J57 production discography =

The following list is a discography of production by J57, an American hip hop record producer from New York City, New York. It includes a list of songs produced, co-produced and remixed by year, artist, album and title.

== Singles produced ==
List of singles as producer or co-producer, with performing artists and other credited producers, showing year released and album name
Title	Year	Performing artist(s)	Other producer(s)	Album
"4 Tha Streetz"	2012	Nutso (featuring AG da Coroner, Camiliano & Shaze)	—	Non-album singles
"Problems"	2012	El Gant (featuring J57 & Tek)	—	Non-album singles
"61 Grace"	2012	Booda French	—	Ventolin
"Understand Me"	2013	E Holla (featuring J57, Tenacity & Hi-Q)	—	Non-album single
"They Follow"	2013	Jefferson Price	—	Just Assume, I'm Everywhere
"Big Poppa $wank"	2014	Joey Bada$$	—	Non-album singles
"The Main Event (J57 Remix)"	2014	J57 (featuring Action Bronson, Meyhem Lauren, Maffew Ragazino & Rasheed Chappell)	—	Non-album singles
"What's Love (J57 Remix)"	2014	Torae (featuring Pharoahe Monch & Akie Bermiss)	—	Non-album singles
"The Void (J57 Remix)"	2014	Cage	—	Non-album singles
"Look At Me Now"	2015	Critical (featuring Evidence, J57 & Andrew Thomas Reid)	—	Non-album singles
"Matters (J57 Remix)"	2015	Choosey (featuring Fashawn)	—	Non-album singles
"Show Stoppa (J57 Remix)"	2015	El Da Sensei	—	Non-album singles
"Lost in the Game (J57 Remix)"	2015	G Koop & O-Man (featuring Tajai)	—	Non-album singles
"The Purple Tape"	2015	Method Man	—	The Meth Lab
"GMR"	2015	Shabaam Sahdeeq (featuring DJ Eclipse)	—	Non album singles
"Whatever It Takes (J57 Remix)"	2015	DJ JS-1 (featuring Murs, Fashawn & Akie Bermiss)	—	Non album singles
"Fortune"	2015	Jabee	—	Non album singles
"The Real"	2015	Rick Gonzalez	—	Non album singles
"Set Ablaze"	2015	Brown Bag AllStars (featuring Akie Bermiss)	—	Non album singles
"Let's Get It"	2015	Hus Kingpin (featuring SmooVth)	—	Splash Bros
"Lights Out (J57 & G Koop Remix)"	2016	DV Alias Khryst (featuring Redman)	—	Non-album single
"Tri-State Mindstate"	2016	Kirswords (featuring Soul Khan & Joe Swisher)	—	ABM Records Presents The Vault
"The Life"	2016	Joe Swisher (featuring Reese & Eno Noziroh)	—	ABM Records Presents The Vault
"The Closure"	2016	Sparx (featuring CAMDOE)	—	ABM Records Presents The Vault
"The Crifftro..."	2016	Katiah (featuring J57 & Jesse Mechanic of Antcs)	—	MixKatape... the Hype
"FOH Pt. 2 (J57 Remix)"	2016	Da Villins (featuring Prodigy)	—	Non-album singles
"Can't Understand (J57 Remix)"	2016	Cas Metah (featuring Blueprint)	—	Non-album singles
"Easy, No Hands"	2016	Booda French	—	Awesome is Everyday
"Inner Thoughts"	2016	LEX (featuring Spit Gemz)	—	Necessary
"Optical Illusion (J57 Remix)"	2016	Theory Hazit	—	Non-album singles
"Smoke Bomb"	2016	J57 & Sür Niles (of Pro Era)	Sür Niles	Non-album singles
"Parkside Ave"	Aaron Rose	—	Elixir	
"Art of Sole"	Aaron Rose	—	Elixir	
"Speak Clear"	LEX	—	Non-album singles	
"New Problems"	2017	Token	Non-album singles	Jon Glass
"This is Jamo Gang"	2017	Jamo Gang	—	Jamo Gang EP
"Here We Go Again"	2018	Jamo Gang	—	Jamo Gang EP
"All Eyes on Us"	2018	Jamo Gang	—	Jamo Gang EP
"The Altar"	2018	Jamo Gang (featuring Snak the Ripper)	—	Jamo Gang EP
"Amethyst"	2018	Dirty Sanchez	—	Non-album single

== 2005 ==
=== Sabac Red — The Collabo Collection Volume One ===
- 07. "Controversy Rap" (featuring Sabac Red)

== 2008 ==
=== Chaz Kangas — Knee Jerk Reaction ===
- 02. "Hero Of Underground Rap"

=== Sev Statik — Shotgun ===
- 11. "Never Fall Off"
- 12. "Shotgun"

=== Brown Bag AllStars — Brown Bag All Stars ===
- 02. "Get Up"
- 03. "Dinner's Ready"
- 05. "The Boss is Back"
- 06. "Raw Daddy"
- 09. "The City Never Sleeps"
- 10. "Poison Apple"
- 11. "Lou Reed"
- 14. "Robo Trippin"

== 2009 ==
=== Critical — En Varning ===
- B4. "Takin' Over (J57 Remix)" (featuring Craig G and Saul Abraham)

=== Homeboy Sandman — The Good Sun ===
- D3. "Angels With Dirty Faces"

== 2010 ==
=== LST Da Phunky Child — Super Chrom Hifi:The Sessions ===
- 12. ""S" Auf Der Brust"

=== Soul Khan — Soul Like Khan ===
- 01. "6:30 A.M."
- 02. "Fe La Soul"
- 03. "Knuckle Puck" (featuring 8thW1, Homeboy Sandman and Koncept)
- 04. "The Place That Birthed Me"
- 07. "Shitted On"
- 08. "Suck My Dick"
- 12. "Minyan"
- 13. "Soul Like Khan"

=== Brown Bag AllStars — The Traveller EP ===
- A2. "Modesty" (featuring Daniel Joseph)
- B1. "Knuckle Puck" (featuring 8thW1, Homeboy Sandman and Koncept)
- B2. "Lights Out" (featuring Skyzoo)

=== Various Artistes — Free Shabazz ===
- 01. "Antiquarian"

=== Koncept — Playing Life ===
- 07. "First Time"
- 08. "Old Man Winters"

== 2011 ==
=== Nitty Scott — The Cassette Chronicles ===
- 10. "No Standing Here (Snippet)"

=== Various Artistes — Basementality Battles Mixtape Vol. 1 ===
- 12. "61 Grace"

=== Brown Bag AllStars — Brown Bag Season Vol. 1 ===
- 1-1. "PayDro Brown Bag Season Intro" (co-produced with DeeJay Element)
- 1-2. "The Agenda"

== 2012 ==
=== Koncept — Awaken ===
- 02. "Too Late"
- 03. "Aspirations" (featuring Soul Khan)
- 04. "Getting Home" (featuring Sene)
- 06. "Understanding"
- 07. "The Crash" (co-produced with The Audible Doctor)
- 11. "Awaken"

=== Homeboy Sandman — Chimera ===
- B1. "Illuminati"

=== Koncept — Watch the Sky Fall EP ===
- B1. "Aspirations"

=== Sene — Brooklyknight ===
- 07. "Holyday"

=== Denitia & Sene — Blah Blah Blah ===
- 02. "How to Satisfy" (co-produced with Nohli)
- 03. "She's Not the Only One" (co-produced with Nohli & DeeJay Element)

=== DJ Modesty — Kings From Queens 2 & 2.1 ===
- 1-16. "Murder In The 16 Degree (16 Bars Freestyle)"

=== Homeboy Sandman — First Of A Living Breed ===
- 03. "Couple Bars (Honey, Sugar, Darling, Sweetie, Baby, Boo)"
- 05. "Illuminati"

=== Gameboi — Young & Restless ===
- 07. "Emergency"
- "09. Gimme Shelter"

=== Brown Bag AllStars — Brown Bag Season Vol. 2 ===
- 04. "Say it Now" (featuring Akie Bermiss)

06. "BRWN (J57 Remix) (remixer)

=== Nitty Scott — The Boombox Diaries Vol. 1 ===
- 06. "No Standing Here (Everybody Go)"

=== DJ Mickey Knox — All For The Love Deluxe Edition ===
- 19. "Story To Tell Remix" (featuring Chaundon and Little Vic)

== 2013 ==
=== G. Huff — Vacant Thoughts ===
- 01. "I Ain't Done Yet (Intro)"

=== Silent Knight — Busy Is My Best Friend II ===
- 10. "Craft Brewed II"

=== Jefferson Price — Just Assume, I'm Everywhere ===
- 01. "What You Saying Though"
- 02. "They Follow"
- 04. "Good Old Days"
- 05. "Persistence" (featuring J57, Koncept & The Audible Doctor)

=== Joell Ortiz — Feel So Good ===
- 01. "Feel So Good (J57 Remix)"
- 02. "Feel So Good (J57 Remix Instrumental)"
- 05. "Feel So Good (J57 Remix 2)" (featuring Koncept)

=== Denitia & Sene — His and Hers ===
- 08. "She's Not the Only One" (co-produced with DeeJay Element)
- 09. How to Satisfy" (as co-producer)

=== Blame One & J57 — Walk in the Sun ===
- A1. "B.L.A.M.E.57" (featuring DJ Rhettmatic)
- A2. "They Don't Know" (featuring Akie Bermiss)
- A3. "The Movement" (featuring Brown Bag AllStars)
- B1. "Zonin'" (featuring Jared Tankel Of The Budos Band)
- B2. "Circuit Overload"
- B3. "Knowledge Wisdom Overstanding"
- C1. "Just a Memory (Interlude)"
- C2. "Before the Sunset" (featuring Exile)
- C3. "How Much Time's Left" (featuring Akie Bermiss)
- D1. "Mad Money"
- D2. "SD to BK" (featuring Jared Tankel Of The Budos Band & Yesh)
- D3. "Lucid Dream"
- D4. "Walk in the Sun" (featuring Soul Khan)

=== Koncept — Malt Disney J57 Remix EP ===
- 01. "Oh Baby (J57 Remix)" (remixer)
- 02. "40 oz Spliffs (J57 Remix)" (remixer)
- 03. "Open Tab (J57 Remix)" (remixer)
- 04. "Malt Disney (J57 Remix)" (remixer)

=== DJ Brace — The Electric Nosehair Orchestra Remixed ===
- 03. "NH9 (J57 Remix)" (remixer)

== 2014 ==
=== J57 — Wax Aesthetic ===
- 05. "Everybody's Gotta Live"

=== Booda French — Dreams Of Brooklyn ===
- 01. "Dreams of Brooklyn" (featuring Carnell James Cook)

=== Homeboy Sandman — Hallways ===
- 05. "Activity"

=== LST Da Phunky Child — Zielkonflikt ===
- B7. "Zielkonflikt"

== 2015 ==
=== Brown Bag AllStars — 2014: A Year in Review ===
- 01. "What's Love (J57 Sample-Free Remix)" (featuring Torae, Pharoahe Monch & Akie Bermiss)
- 09. "The Void (J57 Sample-Free Remix)" (featuring Cage)

=== Westside Gunn — Hitler Wears Hermes II ===
- A1. "Big L & Half a Mil"

=== Hus Kingpin & SmooVth — Splash Brothers EP ===
- 08. "Let's Get It"

=== Tuka — Life Death Time Eternal ===
- A1. "L.D.T.E"

=== Method Man — The Meth Lab ===
- 14. "The Purple Tape" (featuring Raekwon & Inspectah Deck)

== 2016 ==
=== Homeboy Sandman — Kindness for Weakness ===
- 14. "Speak Truth" (featuring Kurious, Breeze Brewin & Aesop Rock)

=== Koncept & J57 — The Fuel ===
- 01. "Porcelain" (featuring Hollis)
- 02. The Fuel" (featuring Akie Bermiss)
- 03. "Excitement" (featuring Andrew Thomas Reid)
- 04. "Crazy Is Beautiful" (featuring Nevaeh)
- 05. "Live Forever" (featuring Dice Raw)
- 06. "Jump" (featuring Akie Bermiss)
- 07. "Patience" (featuring Denitia)
- 08. "Plane Ticket" (featuring The Grand Concourse)

=== Blu & Nottz — Titans in the Flesh ===
- B2. "Atlantis (J57 Remix)" (remixer)

=== Reks — The Greatest X ===
- D4. "Intuition"

=== DJ Madnice — The Madnice Mixtape ===
- 04. "61 Grace"

=== La Coka Nostra — To Thine Own Self Be True ===
- 01. "Dark Day Road"

=== Q-Unique & The Brown Bag AllStars — BlaQ Coffee ===
- 02. "Let's Go"
- 03. "No #Tbt"
- 10. "If I Don't Do It"

== 2017 ==
=== Ras Kass — Soul On Ice: Revisited ===
- A2. "On Earth...Revisited (J57 Remix)" (remixer)

== 2018 ==
=== Jamo Gang — Jamo Gang EP ===
- 01. "This Is Jamo Gang"
- 02. "Go Away"
- 03. "Straight, No Chase"
- 04. "Here We Go Again" (featuring Big Twins)
- 05. "All Eyes on Us"
- 06. "Welcome to the Golden Era"
- 07. "Jamo Gang" (featuring Shabaam Sahdeeq)
- 08. "The Altar" (featuring Snak the Ripper)
