= Fuel (disambiguation) =

Fuel is any material that can release energy, especially by burning.

Fuel may also refer to:

== Music ==
- Fuel (band), an American post-grunge band from Pennsylvania
- Fuel (hardcore band), an American post-hardcore trio from California
- Fuel (Larry Young album), 1975
- Fuel, an album by Raised Fist, 1998
- Fuel (EP), by Fuel, 1994
- The Fuel, an EP by Koncept and J57, 2015
- "Fuel" (Metallica song), 1998
- "Fuel" (Eminem song), 2024
- "Fuel", a song by Ani DiFranco from Little Plastic Castle, 1998
- "Fuel", a song by Black Thought from Streams of Thought, Vol. 3: Cane & Able, 2020
- "Fuel", a song by Lit from Tripping the Light Fantastic, 1997
- "Fueled", a song by Anthrax from Stomp 442, 1995

== Science and technology ==
- Fuel (journal), a scientific journal covering fuel research
- SGI Fuel, a workstation

== Other uses ==
- Fuel (film), a 2008 documentary film
- Fuel (video game), a 2009 racing game
- Fuel Industries, a defunct Canadian online interactive and marketing agency
- Fuel TV (disambiguation), several television sports channels
- Dallas Fuel, an American esports team in the Overwatch League
