= I'm the J57 =

I'm The J57

Studio album by J57
- Released: January 19, 2016
- Recorded: 2014–2015
- Genre: Rap; West Coast hip hop; indie rock
- Length: 43:03
- Label: FiveSeven
- Producer: J57; Sene; LuvJonez; Sean Bamberger

J57 chronology
Walk In The Sun (with Blame One) (2013)	I'm The J57 (2016)

Singles from I'm The J57
- 1. "Soarin' Like Jordan" Released: March 25, 2015; 2. "Impatient" Released: January 8, 2016; 3. "Burn The Empires" Released: January 11, 2016; 4. "Jon Bellion 4 Prez" Released: January 12, 2016

I'm The J57 is the first full-length solo studio album of American rapper and music producer J57. With major music production credits from J57, the album was released on January 19, 2016, through FiveSeven Music. Preceding the album's release were singles "Soarin' Like Jordan" which featured vocal appearances from Archie Bang and The Audible Doctor, "Impatient" featuring Tiffany Topol, "Burn The Empires" featuring DeeJay Element, Tenacity, Sean Boog and Mean Joe Scheme and "Jon Bellion 4 Prez", a song he released as a tribute to Jon Bellion.

== Critical reception ==
Professional ratings
Review scores
Source	Rating
The Over Grown	B
HYPEFRESH Magazine	8/10 stars

I'm The J57 was generally received to positive reviews from music critics and enthusiasts alike. Michael Cook of HYPEFRESH Magazine gave the album 8 stars out of 10 stating that: “The message behind the music is what makes this album an exclusive. Absent of sweet nothings and mind numbing lyrics, J57 proves that music can empower and uplift. His lyrical content and production is superb”. In the same vein The Over Grown's KC Orcutt, a music critic and columnist gave the album a positive review while describing the album and its lyrical content as an album "for dreamers, for fighters and for artists".

== Track listing ==
No.	Title	Writer(s)	Producer(s)	Length
1.	"Plan A / Grammy Speeches"	James Heinz	J57	3:30
2.	"Jon Bellion 4 Prez"	James Heinz	J57	2:44
3.	"Night Falls / Idiosyncratic^{a}"	James Heinz	J57	4:29
4.	"Impatient^{b}" (featuring Tiffany Topol)	James Heinz; Tiffany Topol	J57	3:02
5.	"Dreamers^{c}" (featuring Akie Bermiss, Mike Two and Koncept)	James Heinz; Akie Bermiss; Mike Two; Keith Whitehead	LuvJonez	3:47
6.	"Kid Icaru$" (featuring Jesse Mechanic and Nichelle of Bulla Fey)	James Heinz; Jesse Mechanic; Nichelle	J57	4:15
7.	"VMPRWKND^{d}" (featuring Thom Seveer)	James Heinz; Thom Seveer	J57	4:39
8.	"Starscream"	James Heinz	J57	2:25
9.	"No Future^{e}" (featuring F. Virtue)	James Heinz; F. Virtue	J57	2:13
10.	"Numb / Gaslighting^{f}"	James Heinz	Sean Bamberger; Sene	5:25
11.	"Soarin' Like Jordan^{g}" (featuring Archie Bang and The Audible Doctor)	James Heinz; Archie Bang; Mark Woodford	J57	4:35
12.	"Burn The Empires^{h}" (featuring DeeJay Element, Tenacity, Sean Boog and Mean Joe Scheme)	James Heinz; Joseph Montana; Tenacity; Sean Boog; Charles Chaio	J57	3:21
13.	"Legacy^{i}" (featuring Katiah and Matt Stamm)	J57; Katiah; Matt Stamm	J57	4:31
Total length:				49:03

=== Notes ===
- ^a Outro by Nana Rose and Momma57
- ^b Outro reading and words by Khaleesi
- ^c Chorus written by Mike Two with extra vocals by Nichelle
- ^d Intro reading and words by Joe "The Grand Concourse" Rogers
- ^e Extra vocals by Akie Bermiss
- ^f "Numb" was produced by Sean Bamberger while "Gaslighting" was produced by Sene
- ^g Outro by Post Office Mike
- ^h Cuts by DeeJay Element
- ^i Extra vocals by Akie Bermiss

== Credits and personnel ==
- James "J57" Heinz - Main artist, producer, writer
- Sene - Producer
- LuvJonez - Producer
- Sean Bamberger - Producer
- Tiffany Topol - Featured artist
- Keith "Koncept" Whitehead - Featured artist
- Akie Bermiss - Featured artist, additional vocals
- Mike Two - Featured artist, writer
- Mark "The Audible Doctor" Woodford - Featured artist
- Archie Bang - Featured artist
- Joseph "DeeJay Element" Montana - Featured artist, cuts
- Katiah - Featured artist
- Matt Stamm - Featured artist
- Charles Chaio - Featured artist
- F. Virtue - Featured artist
- Thom Seveer - Featured artist
- Jesse Mechanic - Featured artist
- Nichelle - Featured artist, additional vocals

== Release history ==
Country/Digital platform	Date	Version	Format	Label
United States; SoundCloud	January 19, 2016	Standard	CD; digital download	Brown Bag AllStars; FiveSeven Music
