= 2057 (EP) =

EP by J57
- Released: May 22, 2012
- Recorded: 2010–2012
- Genres: Hip hop, rap, East Coast hip hop
- Label: Soulspazm
- Producers: Executive producer: James Heinz; Additional producers: Tenacity; Audible Doctor; DJ Goo; Sene; Dylan Margerum; Randy Todaro; Mike Maven

J57 chronology
2057 (2012)	The Ports (2012)

2057 is the first of the two debut solo EPs by American rapper and record producer J57. Released simultaneously along with The Ports, 2057 features vocal appearances from notable artistes including DJ Brace, Sene, Homeboy Sandman, Rob Kelly, Soul Khan, Koncept, Silent Knight and Theory Hazit.

== Track listing ==
No.	Title	Length
1.	"Sam Kinison's Revenge" (featuring Soul Khan, Rob Kelly, Juan Deuce & DJ Brace)	4:05
2.	"Half Zombie" (featuring Silent Knight, Emilio Lopez, Koncept & DJ Emoh Betta)	3:38
3.	"The Main Event" (featuring Meyhem Lauren, Action Bronson, Maffew Ragazino, Rasheed Chappell & DJ Brace)	4:51
4.	"Dream Walking" (featuring Jon Hope)	3:23
5.	"Holy Mackrel!" (featuring Sene & Homeboy Sandman)	2:51
6.	"Elite Status" (featuring Rasheed Chappell & DJ Brace)	2:35
7.	"They Never Come Close To" (featuring Theory Hazit)	3:04
8.	"Pulp Fiction" (featuring Koncept)	2:20

Bonus tracks
No.	Title	Length
9.	"#amalgambvck"	3:36
10.	"As The World Turns" (featuring Julius Myth & Soul Khan)	4:26

== Release history ==
Country	Date	Format	Label
United States	May 22, 2012	Digital download	Soulspazm Records
