= Kevin Van Geem =

Belgian chemical engineer and former footballer

Kevin M. Van Geem
- Van Geem at a pilot plant of the Laboratory for Chemical Technology, Ghent University
- Born: 9 July 1977 (age 49)
- Alma mater: Ghent University
- Awards: Fulbright fellowship (2009); Fellow of The Combustion Institute (2026)
- Scientific career
- Fields: Chemical reaction engineering, chemical kinetics, chemical recycling
- Workplaces: Ghent University; Shanghai Jiao Tong University
- Doctoral advisor: Guy B. Marin
- Website: www.lct.ugent.be/people/kevin-m-van-geem

Kevin M. Van Geem (born 9 July 1977) is a Belgian chemical engineer and senior full professor of thermochemical reaction engineering at Ghent University, where he chairs the board of the Laboratory for Chemical Technology (LCT), directs the Centre for Sustainable Chemistry and leads the university's pilot plants for steam cracking and chemical recycling. His research covers the kinetic modelling of steam cracking, the chemical recycling of plastic waste, the electrification of chemical production and the application of machine learning in chemical engineering. Before and during his academic career he played football at second-division level in Belgium.

== Education and career ==
Van Geem studied chemical engineering (burgerlijk ingenieur scheikunde) at Ghent University. After a brief period at the ExxonMobil refinery in Antwerp in 2001, he returned to the university's Laboratory for Chemical Technology as a doctoral researcher funded by the Flemish agency IWT. He obtained his PhD in 2006 under the supervision of Guy B. Marin.

From 2006 to 2010 he was a postdoctoral researcher of the Research Foundation – Flanders (FWO), and from 2008 to 2010 he also worked at the Massachusetts Institute of Technology (MIT) in the group of William H. Green, holding a Fulbright fellowship in 2009. He joined the Ghent University faculty in 2010 as assistant professor, became associate professor in 2015 and full professor in 2017, and is now senior full professor. He was a visiting professor at Stanford University in 2018 and held scholarships at Stanford's Center for Turbulence Research in 2018 and 2020. He is also affiliated with Shanghai Jiao Tong University.

Since 2022 he has been chief technology officer of CAPTURE, a research platform on CO_{2} capture and utilisation. He directs the university's pilot plants for steam cracking and chemical recycling. In 2015 his research group founded the spin-off company AVGI, which commercialises steam cracking simulation software; he sits on its board of directors.

== Research ==
Van Geem's early research concerned detailed kinetic models for steam cracking, the main industrial route to ethylene and propylene, and coke formation in cracking furnaces. With Green's group at MIT he showed in 2006 that a kinetic model for the steam cracking of n-hexane could be generated automatically with the Reaction Mechanism Generator (RMG). His group also works on the analytical characterisation of petrochemical and biochemical mixtures, including by comprehensive two-dimensional gas chromatography.

A 2017 review in Waste Management by Kim Ragaert, Laurens Delva and Van Geem, comparing mechanical and chemical recycling routes for solid plastic waste, is his most cited paper. A 2021 review in Progress in Energy and Combustion Science, written with co-authors from Ghent University and the Polytechnic University of Milan, discussed the reaction chemistry of plastic pyrolysis and gasification.

In 2019 Van Geem, Vladimir Galvita and Guy Marin discussed how electricity could replace fossil fuels as the energy source for chemical production.

His group also applies machine learning in chemical engineering; a 2021 paper in Engineering assessed the strengths, weaknesses, opportunities and threats of machine learning in the field.

== Editorial and professional activities ==
Van Geem is co-editor-in-chief of Current Opinion in Chemical Engineering, editor-in-chief of Fuel Communications and an editor of Fuel.

== Awards and honours ==
- Fulbright postdoctoral fellowship, Massachusetts Institute of Technology (2009)
- Fellow of The Combustion Institute (2026), "for transformative advances in kinetic modeling, experimental methods, and sustainable combustion science"

== Football career ==
Van Geem played as a midfielder. In 2007, while he was playing for FCV Dender as the club won promotion to the Belgian First Division, the Dutch press agency ANP reported that he was also a lecturer at Ghent University and had earlier turned down offers from top Belgian clubs, including AA Gent, to concentrate on his studies. From 2007 to 2010 he played for Red Star Waasland in the Second Division. In 2010 he joined KSK De Jeugd Lovendegem.

== Selected publications ==
- Van Geem, K. M.; et al. (2006). "Automatic reaction network generation using RMG for steam cracking of n-hexane". AIChE Journal. 52 (2): 718–730. doi:10.1002/aic.10655.
- Ragaert, K.; Delva, L.; Van Geem, K. (2017). "Mechanical and chemical recycling of solid plastic waste". Waste Management. 69: 24–58. doi:10.1016/j.wasman.2017.07.044.
- Van Geem, K. M.; Galvita, V. V.; Marin, G. B. (2019). "Making chemicals with electricity". Science. 364 (6442): 734–735. doi:10.1126/science.aax5179.
- Dogu, O.; et al. (2021). "The chemistry of chemical recycling of solid plastic waste via pyrolysis and gasification: State-of-the-art, challenges, and future directions". Progress in Energy and Combustion Science. 84 100901. doi:10.1016/j.pecs.2020.100901.
- Dobbelaere, M. R.; et al. (2021). "Machine learning in chemical engineering: strengths, weaknesses, opportunities, and threats". Engineering. 7 (9): 1201–1211. doi:10.1016/j.eng.2021.03.019.
