= The Audible Doctor =

American record producer and rapper

- Born: Mark Vincent Woodford; May 24, 1984 (age 42); Madison, Wisconsin, U.S.
- Origin: Brooklyn, New York City
- Genres: Hip hop; R&B; Instrumental; East Coast hip hop
- Occupations: Record producer; rapper; audio engineer
- Instruments: Vocals; turntables
- Years active: 2003–present
- Labels: Coalmine Records; Mello Music Group; Brown Bag AllStars; AMD Music; Ten12 Records; Fat Beats
- Website: audibledoctor.com

Mark Vincent Woodford (born May 24, 1984), better known by his stage name The Audible Doctor, is a Brooklyn-based American record producer and underground rapper. The Audible Doctor has been credited as producer in critically acclaimed studio albums and EPs including Made In The Streets, 2057, The Ports, Reporting Live, Computer Era, Free Agent and Thug Matrix 3. On January 3, 2014, he was listed in AllHipHop 's "Top 50 Underground/Indie/Emerging Artists Of 2013" before he went on to make a guest appearance at the 2014 edition of the annual Brooklyn Hip-Hop Festival. He is a member of the Brown Bag AllStars, a group of emcees he joined while interning at Fat Beats in 2007.

== Biography ==
Born and raised in Madison, Wisconsin, The Audible Doctor started music having piano and guitar lessons while growing up until his days in high school when he started collecting records and DJing at friends' parties.

In 2002, The Audible Doctor moved to New York to attend an audio engineering and recording school before he started working at Fat Beats store after graduating from college. While interning at Fat Beats, he collaborated with funk group Skull Snaps to release his first production project titled Skull Snaps Meet The Audible Doctor in 2005 and It's A New Day Redux in 2006.

In 2010, The Audible Doctor left Fat Beats and released his first solo EP titled The Crackers then Brownies Deluxe in 2011. He had his first major break as a producer after he was credited in Joell Ortiz's second studio album entitled Free Agent, an album that debuted at #173 on the Billboard 200 with 4,000 copies sold in its first week released.

On 25 September 2012, The Audible Doctor released his critically acclaimed EP titled I Think That... which further earned him more attention from music critics before he went on to release an album titled Doctorin on 30 October 2012. On 24 November 2014, he released an EP titled Can't Keep The People Waiting, the EP featured vocal appearances from acts like Astro, Hassan Mackey of Mello Music Group, Consequence, Bumpy Knuckles, Guilty Simpson and John Robinson.

On 20 June 2015, The Audible Doctor released an EP entitled The Spring Tape off his Seasons EP set which include The Winter Tape and The Summer Tape. His style of production has seen him work with notable acts like 50 Cent for the freestyle titled "This Is Murder Not Music," Astro, Koncept, Fredro Starr, Joell Ortiz, and many more.

== Discography ==
Albums by The Audible Doctor
Year	Album title	Release details
2007	Brownies	Released: 14 February 2007; Label: AMD Music; Format: CD/Vinyl
2012	Doctorin	Released: 30 October 2012; Label: Money Maker Entertainment; Format: Digital download
2013	Made In The Streets (with Fredro Starr)	Released: 25 December 2013; Label: Mad Money Entertainment; Format: CD/Digital download

=== Singles ===
Year	Title	Notes
	Walking	featuring Silent Knight
	This Is Murder Not Music	featuring 50 Cent
	The Burial Plot	
	Leave Me Alone	featuring Guilty Simpson
	Chocolate Covered Liar	featuring Astro & Hassan Mackay
	Multiply	featuring John Robinson
	Fall In Love	featuring John Simpson
	The Beast	featuring Bumpy Knuckles
	No Future	featuring Consequence
	Dirty Nigga	featuring Chaundon
	The Vibe	featuring Oddisee & Hassaan Mackey
	Space Age Love	
	Thought of You	featuring Kurious
	Bars of Death	featuring J NICS
	Wings	
	Pep Rally	Instrumental
	Feel What I Feel	Instrumental
	Not Pop	Instrumental
	Shot Glass Magnified	Instrumental
	Crumbling Down	Instrumental
	Where I'm At	featuring Davenport Grimes
	The Roster	featuring Edo G
	Shiny Things	featuring Davenport Grimes
	The Winter	featuring Davenport Grimes
	Incarcerated Stargazers	featuring Davenport Grimes
	Success	featuring Chaundon

=== Credits ===
Selected production credits
Year	Album	Primary artist(s)	Credit
2011	Wouldn't Change Nothing	Trek Life	Remixer
2011	Thug Matrix 3	Tragedy Khadafi	Producer
2011	Free Agent	Joell Ortiz	Producer
2011	Conversation B	Has Lo	Producer
2011	The Brown Study Remixes	Boog Brown	Remixer
2012	Subject: Matter	Homeboy Sandman	Producer
2012	Reporting Live	Journalist 103	Producer
2012	The Brown Label	Brown Bag AllStars	Producer, remixer
2012	The Ports	J57	Mixing
2012	2057	J57	Mixing
2012	The Brown Label Part 2	Brown Bag AllStars	Producer, remixer
2013	The Manual	Audimatic	Producer
2013	The Electric Nosehair Orchestra Remixed	DJ Brace	Remixer
2013	Dear Kanye	Genesis Elijah	Producer
2013	Made In The Streets	Fredro Starr	Producer
2014	Mandala Vol. 2, Today's Mathematics	Various artists	Producer
2014	All Eyes on Reks	Rexs	Producer
2014	Around The Sun	J-Live	Producer
2014	Sunrise BLVD	Tommie	Producer
2015	2014: A Year in Review	Brown Bag AllStars	Featured, producer, remixer
2015	Legend Has It	Magestik Legend	Producer
2015	Splash Brothers	Hus Kingpin & Smoovth	Producer
2015	Premiumgrade	Neek the Exotic	Producer
2015	Protect The Code	The Black Opera	Producer
2016	The Greatest X	Reks	Producer
2017	Veins	Homeboy Sandman	Producer

EPs by The Audible Doctor
Year	Title	Release details
2010	The Crackers Vol. 1	Released: 23 February 2010; Label: AMD Music; Format: CD/Vinyl
2011	Brownies Delux	Released: 2011; Label: Self-released; Format: Digital download
2011	The Spread	Released: 8 February 2011; Label: AMD Music, Brown Bag AllStars; Format: Digital download
2011	Pursuance(with Soul Khan)	Released: 6 December 2011; Label: Jargon Media Entertainment; Format: CD/Digital download
2012	I Think That...	Released: 25 September 2012; Label: AMD Music; Format: Digital download
2012	And I Lover Her	Released: 13 November 2012; Label: AMD Music; Format: Digital download
2013	The Winter Tape	Released: 12 January 2013; Label: AMD Music; Format: Digital download
2013	The Manual(with Audimatic)	Released: 6 June 2013; Label: –; Format: Cassette/Digital download
2013	The Summer Tape	Released: 30 July 2013; Label: AMD Music; Format: Cassette/Digital download
2014	Can't Keep The People Waiting	Released: 24 November 2014; Label: AMD Music; Format: CD/Vinyl/Digital download
2015	The Spring Tape	Released: 18 June 2015; Label: AMD Music; Format: Digital download
