= The Ports =

EP by J57
- Released: May 22, 2012
- Recorded: 2010–2012
- Genres: Hip hop, East Coast hip hop, gangsta rap
- Label: Soulspazm
- Producers: Executive producer: James Heinz; Additional producers: Tenacity; Audible Doctor; DJ Goo; Sene; Dylan Margerum; Randy Todaro; Mike Maven

J57 chronology
2057 (2012)	The Ports (2012)	Malt Disney (J57 Remix)(with Koncept) (2013)

The Ports is the second of the two debut solo EPs by American rapper and record producer J57. Preceded by 2057, The Ports was released in memory of Bryan "Ports" Coyle, a friend who J57 said was instrumental in his journey into music.

== Track listing ==
No.	Title	Length
1.	"Broken Moments" (featuring The Nezitiq Mute)	4:24
2.	"Fly Away" (featuring ScienZe, Chris Faust & Dom O Briggs)	2:45
3.	"Like A Prayer" (featuring Nitty Scotte, MC & DeeJay Element)	2:28
4.	"Requiem For Ports"	1:30
5.	"Do Earth" (featuring Von Pea, Charlie Smarts, ATR & Jefferson Price)	3:39
6.	"Days Still Turn To Night" (featuring Brown Bag AllStars & ATR)	2:43
7.	"Craft Brewed" (featuring Silent Knight)	3:12
8.	"Four Finger Ringers" (featuring Sene)	1:21
9.	"What Happened To That B-Boy?" (featuring F. Virtue & DJ Emoh Betta)	4:00
10.	"Candle In The Sky" (featuring Mike Maven)	2:58

== Release history ==
Country	Date	Format	Label
United States	May 22, 2012	Digital download	Soulspazm Records
