= Heavy Smoke =

Studio album by DJ Concept
- Released: May 18, 2011
- Recorded: 2011
- Genre: Rap
- Label: Deep Concepts Media
- Producer: DJ Concept

Heavy Smoke is the first fully produced album by DJ Concept. The album features Famoso, Koncept, Rap P, The Day Laborers, Chaundon, Joe Scudda, AC, Nutso, L.I.F.E. Long, Gab Gotcha, The Kid Daytona, Nature, T.Shirt & JR Mint. The project officially launched in Amsterdam. Limited edition CDs were available only in Amsterdam at the time of release. DJ Concept will re-release the album with additional bonus songs.

== Track listing ==
#	Title	Producer(s)	Guest Performer(s)	Length
1	"Almost Forgot Intro"	DJ Concept	Mr. Doobie	:36
2	"Puff Puff Pass That"	DJ Concept	Famoso, Koncept & Rap P	2:39
3	"Half Baked"	DJ Concept	The Day Laborers	3:12
4	"Remain Seated"	DJ Concept	Chaundon & Joe Scudda	4:05
5	"Herbal Cypher Circles"	DJ Concept	AC	3:15
6	"Hold Up (RIP Nate Dogg)"	DJ Concept		3:20
7	"High"	DJ Concept	Nutso, L.I.F.E. Long & Gab Gotcha	3:53
8	"Get Off My Cloud"	DJ Concept	The Kid Daytona & Nature	3:44
9	"Ain't Got Time"	DJ Concept	T.Shirt & JR Mint	2:45
