= Thug Matrix 3 =

Studio album by Tragedy Khadafi
- Released: September 20, 2011
- Genre: East Coast hip hop
- Label: 25 To Life Aura/Money Maker Entertainment
- Producer: Audible Doctor; Shroom; Now & Laterz; AraabMuzik; Ayatollah; Booth; Asmatik

Tragedy Khadafi chronology
Lethal Weapon (2009)	Thug Matrix 3 (2011)	Militant Minds EP (2012)

Professional ratings
Review scores
Source	Rating
RapReviews	link
The Rap Up	link
Hip Hop DX	link

Thug Matrix 3 is the seventh studio album by the hip hop artist Tragedy Khadafi. It was released on September 20, 2011.

== Track listing ==
#	Title	Performer(s)	Producer(s)	Time
1	"Narcotic Lines"	Tragedy Khadafi	AraabMuzik	3:54
2	"Ill-Luminous Flow"	Tragedy Khadafi	Now & Laterz	3:29
3	"Black Prince"	Tragedy Khadafi	Ayatollah	2:48
4	"Free Thinkers"	Tragedy Khadafi	Shroom	3:50
5	"Each One, Teach One"	Tragedy Khadafi	Audible Doctor	1:43
6	"Gorilla Warefare Status"	Tragedy Khadafi, Killah Sha	Asmatik	3:10
7	"The Wake Up"	Tragedy Khadafi	Booth	2:59
8	"Still Breathin'"	Tragedy Khadafi	Now & Laterz	3:50
9	"Outstanding"	Tragedy Khadafi	Audible Doctor	1:57
10	"Best Of Both Coast"	Tragedy Khadafi, Killah Sha, King David & Planet Asia	-	4:16
