= Custom Made (hip-hop group) =

American hip-hop group

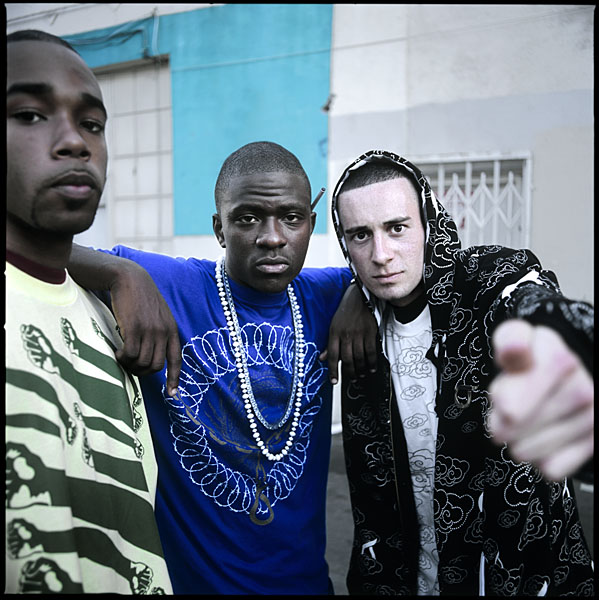
- Element, Bluff and Scoobs of Custom Made

Background information
- Also known as: C-Made
- Origin: Los Angeles, California
- Genres: West Coast hip-hop, hip-hop, Gangsta Rap
- Years active: 2002-present
- Labels: Custom Made Recordings (2004-present); Coalmine (2010); Babygrande (2006-2008); Rawkus (2007)
- Members: Bluff; Element; Scoobs
- Website: custommadehiphop.com

Custom Made (also known as C-Made) is an American hip-hop trio from Los Angeles, California known for their hardcore reality based mixtape series, Street Cinema. They were key players in helping to establish a mixtape scene in Los Angeles during the early 2000s (decade). The group is made up of emcees Bluff, Element and Scavie Scoobs.

== Career ==
In 2002, Bluff, Element, Scoobs and Six formed the group at their high school in LA. Aneek was introduced to the group through mutual friends and joined the crew later that year. In 2004, they released their first straight-to-street album, LA State of Mind, to critical acclaim. This led to the beginning of their Street Cinema mixtape series which would help catapult the group's underground notoriety. Within a few years of their formation Custom Made had already sold over 100,000 units worldwide. After a string of mixtape releases Custom Made saw their popularity grow, but with the release of The Blackboard Jungle (2006) they enjoyed their most success and began receiving offers from numerous labels. They ultimately made the decision to turn down the majors and go the independent route by signing with Babygrande in 2006. That same year, Babygrande released Sidewalk Mindtalk, a compilation highlighting their standout mixtape records. Their proper debut album, Fresh Out, was intended to be released after their signing, but was put on hold after Six was sentenced to four years in prison for counterfeiting and drug sales. 2006 also marked the year Aneek relocated to the East Coast. The material originally intended for Fresh Out was eventually converted into Truth Be Told and released by Rawkus in 2007. With Six in prison and Aneek on the East Coast, the crew returned as a trio to release their proper Babygrande debut, Original Dynasty, in 2008. In 2009, the group left Babygrande due to financial disagreements and released The Lost Weekend independently. In 2010 the group signed a one-album deal with NY label Coalmine Records to release their fourth studio album, Hi-Def.

Along with fellow LA acts such as Strong Arm Steady and DJ Warrior, Custom Made helped pioneer a mixtape scene that was previously non-existent in Los Angeles. Custom Made became one of the first LA artists to consistently use mixtapes and DVDs for promotional and marketing purposes.

On March 7, 2011, Bluff appeared in a Los Angeles federal court and was charged with fifteen counts of wire fraud and conspiracy to commit wire fraud. Federal prosecutors accused Bluff and ten co-defendants of scamming $1.5 million out of victims throughout the US with an advanced fee scam. He was facing up to twenty years in prison on those charges. On January 30, 2012, Bluff was sentenced to 12 months in prison for his role in the wire fraud scheme.

== Custom Made Recordings ==
In 2004, Scoobs founded Custom Made Recordings as an outlet for the group to release their independent albums and mixtapes. The label is currently distributed by IODA.

== Custom Made Crew ==
The Custom Made Crew is a collective of Los Angeles based hip-hop musicians made up of Aneek, Bluff, Element, Paradox, Skitzo, Scoobs, Six and S-Mak and producers Abstrakt Soundz, THX, Finesse, and Jayem. Members from the crew have appeared on every Custom Made release since LA State of Mind.

== Discography ==
=== Albums ===
Album information
LA State of Mind
- Released: March 2, 2004
- Label: Custom Made Recordings
- Singles: "What Is It?"/"Escape Your Mind"
Truth Be Told
- Released: November 27, 2007
- Label: Rawkus Records
- Singles: "07 I See"/"I'm Home"
Original Dynasty
- Released: May 27, 2008
- Label: Babygrande Records
- Singles: "Original Dynasty"
Hi-Def
- Released: November 9, 2010
- Label: Coalmine Records
- Singles: "LA Steeze"/"Watch That"

=== Mixtapes ===
Album information
Live From Los Angeles
- Released: 2005
- Label: Custom Made Recordings
Pillow Talk
- Released: June 8, 2005
- Label: Custom Made Recordings
Sin City
- Released: 2005
- Label: Custom Made Recordings
The Blackboard Jungle
- Released: April 24, 2006
- Label: Custom Made Recordings
- Singles: "M.I.Aneek"
Sidewalk Mindtalk
- Released: September 19, 2006
- Label: Babygrande Records
- Singles: "M.I.Aneek/Go Away"
Heavy Traffic
- Released: May 27, 2008
- Label: Custom Made Recordings
- Singles: "LAX", "Trouble"/"West Route"
The Lost Weekend
- Released: June 2, 2009
- Label: Custom Made Recordings
- Singles: "Sunday Money"
