= Coalmine Records =

Independent hip-hop record label

- Founded: 2005
- Founder: Matt Diamond
- Distributor(s): Nail Distribution/Allegro Media Group (for both physical & digital releases); The Orchard (for digital only releases)
- Genre: Hip hop
- Country of origin: United States
- Location: New York City, U.S.
- Official website: coalminerecords.com

Coalmine Records is a Brooklyn, New York-based independent hip-hop record label. Coalmine's catalog includes Pharoahe Monch, El Da Sensei, Kool G. Rap, Talib Kweli, Large Professor, Heltah Skeltah, Dilated Peoples, Bekay, Big K.R.I.T, Custom Made, Emilio Rojas, Torae, Skyzoo, Termanology, Alchemist, J.R.Rotem, M-Phazes, Illmind, Khrysis, Shuko, Domingo, DJ Kayslay, DJ Revolution, and DJ Babu.

== History ==
In 2005, Coalmine Records was founded. Matt Diamond is the company's founder and CEO. The label's inaugural release was a 12-inch single that was distributed in April 2005 under Diamond's DJ moniker, titled DJ Dutchmaster Presents: "The Raw" featuring Saigon, Inspectah Deck & Bekay, the latter of which became Coalmine's first signed artist. "The Raw" highlights the classic east coast hip hop style that Diamond would model his label on. After receiving tremendous positive feedback and gracing countless mixshows and mixtapes worldwide, "The Raw" charted as college radio's number one hip hop song in the nation.

In August 2005, Coalmine released its second 12-inch single, this time featuring Supernatural, winner of the 1993 New Music Seminar MC battle and Guinness World Records holder for a nine-hour-long freestyle session. The single, "Altitude", produced by Marco Polo B/W "1-2 Punch", received acclaim from DJs nationwide and helped further brand Coalmine Records into the indie radio community.

For the first two years of the label's history, Coalmine's releases were exclusive to 12-inch singles. In 2007, Rawkus Record's, Rawkus 50 campaign was launched and included Coalmine's flagship artist Bekay as part of their artist roster. Bekay's album The Horror Flick LP was released on November 27, 2007, along with the other members of the Rawkus 50. The LP was released with much praise from the hip hop community and strengthened Bekay's online presence and overall visibility to help set the stage for his Coalmine debut with his full-length LP, Hunger Pains.

Due to the significant decline in vinyl sales, Coalmine Records adapted to a digital platform and signed a label deal with The Orchard in January 2008. Towards the end of 2008, Coalmine Records began to digitally distribute several hip hop titles, which include but are not limited to El Da Sensei & The Returners Global Takeover: New Beginning, CL Smooth "Perfect Timing" featuring Skyzoo (Digi-12"), Bekay's Horror Flick Remix EP and more. In April 2009, Coalmine released The Foundation: A Compilation Produced Entirely by Shuko. The project is hosted by Heltah Skeltah and mixed by DJ Dutchmaster. This release is considered to be Coalmine's first full-length physical & digital release and was received with much acclaim. The Foundation includes several features and guest appearances including Skyzoo, Dre Robinson, Jae Millz, Papoose, Rakim, Talib Kweli, Bad Seed, Bekay, Canibus, Chino XL, Big Noyd, Krondon, Phil the Agony, Craig G., Mr. Met (of Brooklyn Academy), Torae, Shabaam Sahdeeq, DJ Revolution, Heltah Skeltah, HellRazah, Cuban Link, SoulStice, R.A. the Rugged Man, & more.

By the third quarter of 2009, Coalmine Records began the promotional campaign for Bekay's Hunger Pains, which was released on November 10, 2009. The album's maxi-single was released on August 25 with The Alchemist produced "I Am" feat. DJ Revolution B/W "Brooklyn Bridge" featuring the legendary Masta Ace & production by DJ Babu (of Dilated Peoples). The album includes guest appearances from Masta Ace, Dilated Peoples, Saigon, Inspectah Deck, R.A. the Rugged Man, Heltah Skeltah, Wordsworth and DJ Revolution. Producers featured include The Alchemist, Illmind, DJ Babu, Shuko, BeanOne and more. Hunger Pains, ranked among several lifestyle and blogs sites as one of the best hip-hop albums for 2009 and even qualified as an honorable mention among the year's top albums by the legendary DJ Premier.

Coalmine Records continues to expand their growing artist roster with the digital distribution of releases from the Brown Bag AllStars, Cimer Amor & Custom Made. In July 2010, Coalmine Records signed a physical distribution deal with Nail Distribution/Allegro Media Group. The first release under their new deal was Global Takeover 2: Nu World (GT2), the sequel to El Da Sensei & The Returners Global Takeover LP. The album has since been revered as El's best solo effort since the 2002 release of Relax, Relate, Release (Seven Heads Entertainment Ltd.). GT2 features production from the Polish production duo p/k/a The Returners and boasts features from Treach (of Naughty by Nature), Sean Price, Bekay, Rakaa Iriscience, John Robinson, Reks, Akrobatik, Tiye Phoenix, MeLa Machinko & M-Phazes.

April 19, 2011, marked the release of Can You Dig It?, a digital-only compilation containing 15 tracks from the label's singles catalog, released in celebration of the label's five-year anniversary.

== Diamond Media 360 ==
In the second quarter of 2011, Diamond incorporates Diamond Media 360 (DM360), a label, marketing & lifestyle brand that will become the parent company of Coalmine Records. Diamond Media 360 will launch in three tiers, starting with an overhaul of CoalmineRecords.com, followed by the launch of DiamondMedia360 and lastly, TakinMines.com, a hip-hop lifestyle webzine. DM360 functions as a multi-dimensional marketing one-stop, designed to provide independent artists with label services that includes project consulting, online marketing, digital distribution and radio promotions.

== Artists ==
Bekay
Brown Bag AllStars
Cimer Amor
Custom Made
El Da Sensei
M-Phazes
One Dae

== Discography ==
=== 12-Inch Vinyl/Digi-Singles ===
Year	Information
2005	DJ Dutchmaster Presents: "The Raw" feat. Saigon, Inspectah Deck, Bekay B/W "The Raw" (Illmind Remix): 12" Vinyl/Digital
2005	Supernatural: – "Altitude" B/W "1-2 Punch": 12" Vinyl/Digital
2006	Bekay: – "Where Brooklyn At?" feat. Ol' Dirty Bastard B/W "Young": 12" Vinyl/Digital
2006	Big Noyd: – "All Out" feat. Phil The Agony, Krondon, & Mista Sinista B/W "How We Do" feat. Trez: 12" Vinyl/Digital
2008	CL Smooth feat. Skyzoo: – "Perfect Timing": Digi-12"
2008	XL: "Credibility" feat. Sean Price (prod. by Shuko) B/W "The Butcher"; Digi-12"
2008	The Problemaddicts: "Genesis" B/W "What you Need" feat. El Da Sensei & Blacastan; Digi-12"
2009	A.Pinks: – "Held Me Down": Digi-12"
2009	Famoso: – "Underground Railroad" (M-Phazes Remix): Digi-12"
2009	The Foundation Maxi Single: Heltah Skeltah feat. DJ Revolution "Midnight Madness" B/W "Do This" feat. Canibus, Bekay & Chino XL: Digi-12"
2009	BURNTmd: "Microphone Doctor" B/W "Stand The Rain" feat. Akrobatik; Digi-12"
2009	J-Live: – "Super Good": Digi-12"
2009	XL: "Codes" B/W "Violate" feat. Juganot; Digi-12"
2009	One Dae: – "BK All Dae": Digi-12"
2009	Bekay: – "I Am" B/W "Brooklyn Bridge" feat. Masta Ace: Digi-12"
2010	Skyzoo: – The Strung Out Remixes: Digi-12"
2010	BBAS: – The Down Under Remixes: "What It's All About" B/W "League of Intoxicated Gentlemen": Digi-12"
2010	BURNTmd: – Let's Get Ill: Digi-12"
2010	Cimer Amor: – "Another Classic" feat. Burke, Torae & Side Effect: Digi-12"
2010	Chaundon: "Yall Don't Want It"; Digi-12"
2010	Jozeemo: – "Adrenaline": Digi-12"
2010	El Da Sensei & The Returners: "Knowledge Be The Key" feat. Rakaa Iriscience B/W "2 The Death"; Digi-12"
2010	Access Immortal – "The Legacy": Digi-12"
2011	One Dae: – "Play By Play" feat. Evidence: Digi-12"

=== EPs ===
Year	Information
2008	A-Sides From The Archives: Digital
2008	Bekay: -The Horror Flick Remix EP: Digital
2009	El Da Sensei & The Returners : The Money EP; Digital
2009	Heltah Skeltah: – The Midnight Madness Remix EP: Digital
2010	Bekay: – The Hunger Pains Remix EP: Digital
2010	BURNTmd: – Let's Get Ill EP: Digital

=== Full Length/Compilations ===
Year	Information
2008	El Da Sensei & The Returners: – Global Takeover: The Beginning: Digital
2009	Armyfatique: – The Initiation: CD & Digital
2009	Bekay: – The Horror Flick LP: Digital
2009	Coalmine Records Presents: – The Foundation: CD & Digital
2009	Brown Bag AllStars: – The Brown Tape: Digital
2009	Bekay – Hunger Pains LP: CD & Digital
2010	The Foundation Reloaded: Digital-Non iTunes
2010	Cimer Amor: – Taking Nowhere, Somewhere: CD & Digital
2010	El Da Sensei & The Returners: – Global Takeover II: Nu World: CD & Digital
2010	Custom Made: -Hi-Def: Digital
2011	Coalmine Records Presents: -Can You Dig It?: Digital
