= Awaken (Koncept album) =

Studio album by Koncept
- Released: January 17, 2012
- Recorded: 2011–2012
- Genre: Rap, Hip hop
- Label: Soulspazm
- Producer: J57; Marco Polo

Awaken is the debut solo studio album of American rapper Koncept released on 12 January 2012 through Soulspazm Records. With music production from J57 and Marco Polo, the album is an 11-track project with guest vocal appearances from Soul Khan, Sene and Royce da 5'9".

== Track listing ==
No.	Title	Length
1.	"October 10"	1:28
2.	"Too Late"	3:04
3.	"Aspirations" (featuring Soul Khan)	3:44
4.	"Getting Home" (featuring Sene)	3:18
5.	"Watch The Sky Fall" (featuring Royce da 5'9")	2:49
6.	"Understanding"	1:32
7.	"The Crash"	3:40
8.	"Save Me"	3:38
9.	"Long Term"	2:52
10.	"The Only Thing" (featuring Soul Khan)	3:38
11.	"Awaken"	3:13

== Personnel ==
- Keith Whitehead – rapping
- James Heinz – producer
- Marco Bruno – producer
- Noah Weston – featured artist
- Sene – featured artist
- Ryan Montgomey – featured artist

== Release history ==
Country	Date	Format	Label
United States	January 17, 2012	Digital download, CD	Soulspazm Records
