= Militant Minds =

Militant Minds EP

EP by Tragedy Khadafi & Blak Madeen
- Released: September 20, 2012
- Recorded: 2012
- Genre: East coast hip hop
- Length: 31:17
- Label: Leedz Edutainment
- Producer: Skin Ced; Teddy Roxpin; Miestro da Semi-Conductor; Rob Whitaker

Tragedy Khadafi chronology
Thug Matrix 3 (2011)	Militant Minds EP (2012)	Thug Matrix 4.0 (TBA)

Professional ratings
Review scores
Source	Rating
2013mixtapes.com	link

Militant Minds EP is a collaboration between Queensbridge rapper Tragedy Khadafi and Boston duo Blak Madeen (AI-J and Yusuf Abdul-Mateen), released in September 2012 as a free download in Bandcamp.

== Track listing ==
#	Title	Producer(s)	Featured Performer (s)	Length
1	"Intro"	Skin Ced		1:23
2	"Militant Minds"	Teddy Roxpin		3:37
3	"Remain Calm"	Teddy Roxpin		3:56
4	"Ready For War"	Miestro da Semi-Conductor	Blacastan, Reef the Lost Cause	4:12
5	"Trials & Tribulations"	Skin Ced		4:10
6	"Millenium Movement"	Skin Ced		3:31
7	"Step Into My Zone"	Skin Ced		3:32
8	"Nothing I Can Do"	Teddy Roxpin		3:27
9	"Militant Minds (Remix)"	Rob Whitaker		3:39
