= Guy B. Marin =

Professor emeritus of chemical engineering

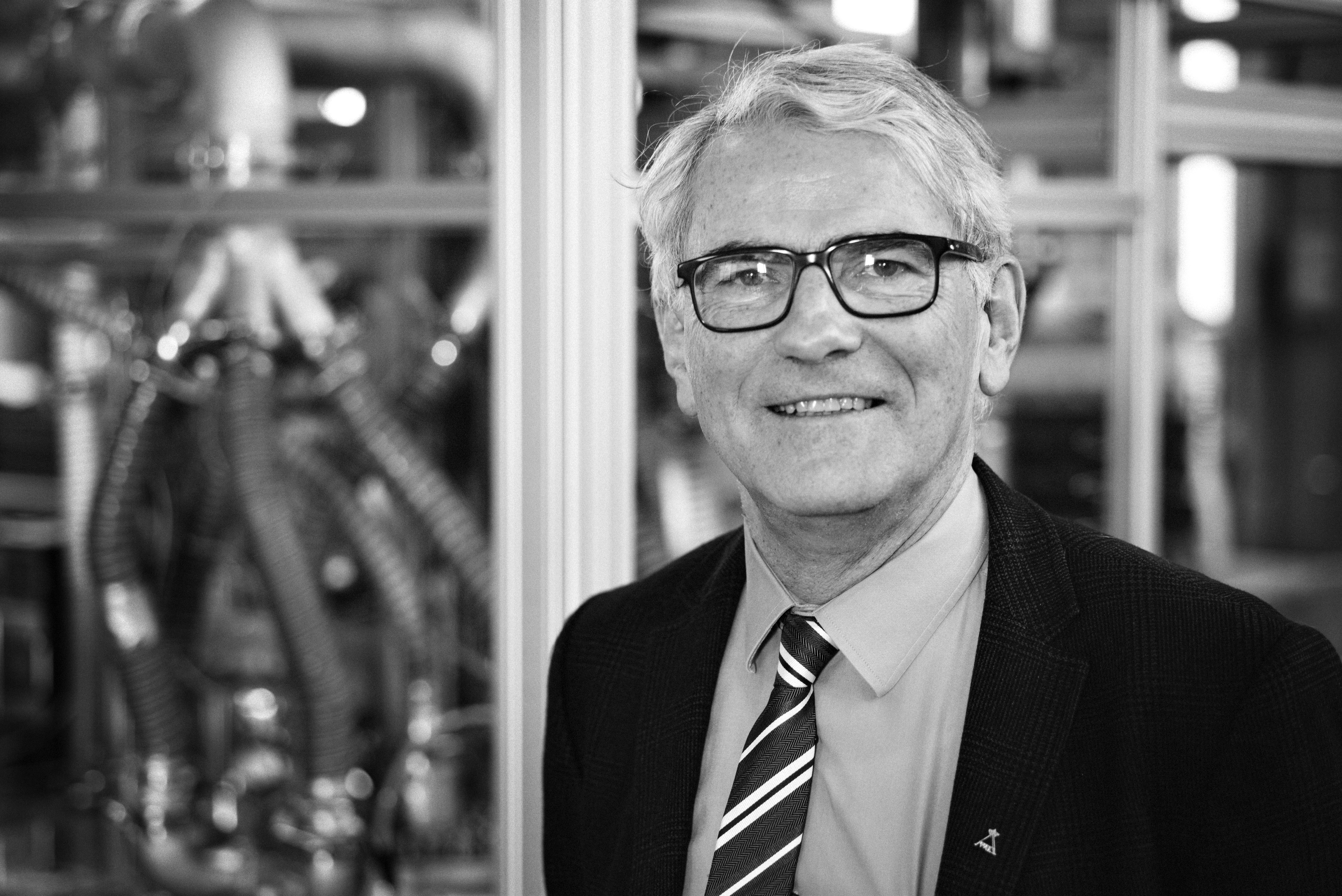
- Born: 1954 (age 71–72)
- Education: Ghent University
- Known for: Chemical kinetics; Chemical engineering
- Awards: Dieter Behrens Medal 2021; Professor Mikhail Slin’ko Honorary Lecture(ChemReactor-24, 2021); Honorary Professor of Tianjin University (2017-); P.V. Danckwerts Memorial Lecture Chemical Engineering and Kinetics (AIChE, 2012)
- Scientific career
- Fields: Chemical reaction engineering; Chemical kinetics; Chemical engineering
- Workplaces: Ghent University; Eindhoven University of Technology

Guy B. Marin is professor emeritus of chemical engineering at the Ghent University, Belgium. He is founding member of the Laboratory for Chemical Technology (LCT) and the Center of Sustainable Chemistry (CSC) at Ghent University. Prior to that, he has been teaching at the Department of Chemical Engineering and Chemistry of Eindhoven University of Technology. His research on chemical kinetics and chemical reaction engineering led in 2015 to a spinoff company. He co-authored two books, Kinetics of Chemical Reactions: Decoding Complexity and Advanced Data Analysis and Modelling in Chemical Engineering.

He is co-editor of the Chemical Engineering Journal and co-editor-in-chief of “Current Opinion in Chemical Engineering”.

== Research ==
The development of multi-scale models of the relevant reactions and reactors with emphasis on the interaction between complex chemical kinetics and complex transport phenomena have been a common theme of his research as well as combining a first principles approach with experimental validation whenever possible.

His kinetic studies have been based on the involved elementary steps with, as much as possible, an ab initio calculation of the rate coefficients. When combined with Computational Fluid Dynamics (CFD) to account for transport of mass, energy and momentum they aim at the development of novel reactor technologies and at the scale up and optimization of established ones.

== Awards and honors ==
- Dieter Behrens Medal (2021)
- Professor Mikhail Slin’ko Honorary Lecture (ChemReactor-24, 2021)
- Honorary Professor of Tianjin University (2017-)
- Member of the Royal Flemish Academy of Belgium for Science and the Arts (2015)
- P.V. Danckwerts Memorial Lecture Chemical Engineering and Kinetics (AIChE, 2012)

== Selected publications ==
- The reaction mechanism of the partial oxidation of methane to synthesis gas: a transient kinetic study over rhodium and a comparison with platinum. E.P.J. Mallens, J.H.B.J. Hoebink, G.B. Marin (Journal of Catalysis, 167, 43–56, 1997)
- Design of adiabatic fixed-bed reactors for the partial oxidation of methane to synthesis gas. Application to production of methanol and hydrogen-for-fuel-cells. C.R.H. de Smet, M.H.J.M. de Croon, R.J..Berger, G.B. Marin, J.C. Schouten (Chemical Engineering Science, 56, 4849–4861, 2001)
- Understanding the failure of direct C-C coupling in the zeolite-catalyzed Methanol-to-Olefin Process. D. Lesthaeghe, V.V. Speybroeck, G.B. Marin, M. Waroquier (Angewandte Chemie International Edition, Very Important Paper (VIP), 45, 1714–1719, 2006)
- Simulation of Heterogeneously MgO-Catalyzed Transesterification for Fine-Chemical and Biodiesel Industrial Production. T.F. Dossin, M.-F. Reyniers, R.J. Berger, G.B. Marin (Appl. Cat. B Environmental, 67, 136–148, 2006)
- Comprehensive Reaction Mechanism for n-Butanol Pyrolysis and Combustion. Harper, M.R.; Van Geem, K.M.; Pyl, S.P.; Marin, G.B.; Green, W.H. (Combustion and Flame, 158, 1, 16–41, 2011)
- Linear Gradient Quality of ATRP Copolymers. Van Steenberge, P.; D’hooge, D.R.; Wang, Y.; Zhong, M.; Reyniers, M.-F.; Konkolewicz, D.; Matyjaszewski, K.; Marin, G.B. (Macromolecules, 45 (21), 8519–8531, 2012)
- Super-dry reforming of methane intensifies CO2 utilization via Le Chatelier's Principle. Buelens, L.C.; Galvita, V.V.; Poelman, H.; Detavernier, C.; Marin, G.B. (Science, 354 (6311), 449–452, 2016)
- The Chemical Route to a Carbon Dioxide Neutral World. Martens, J.; Bogaerts, A.; De Kimpe, N.; Jacobs, P.; Marin, G.B.; Rabaey, K.; Saeys, M.; Verhelst, S. (ChemSusChem, 10, 1–18, 2017)
- New Trends in Olefin Production. Amghizar, I.; Vandewalle, L.A.; Van Geem, K.M.; Marin, G.B. (Engineering, 3 (2), 171–178, 2017)
- Upgrading the value of anaerobic digestion via chemical production from grid injected biomethane. Verbeeck, K.; Buelens, L.C.; Galvita, V.V.; Marin, G.B.; Van Geem, K.M.; Rabaey, K. (Energy & Environmental Science, 11 (7), 1788–1802, 2018)
- Making chemicals with electricity. Van Geem, K.M.; Galvita, V.V.; Marin, G.B. (Science, 364 (6442), 734–735, 2019 Perspective paper)
- Electrified temperature-modulated synthesis. Marin, G.B.; Van Geem, K.M. (Nature Synthesis, 1, 512–513, 2022 News & Views article)
