= The Greatest X =

Studio album by Reks
- Released: September 9, 2016
- Genre: Hip hop
- Length: 121:13
- Label: Brick Records
- Producer: Various: Reks (exec.); EzDread (exec.); The Arcitype (also exec.); Papa D (exec.); 75 Crates; The Alchemist; Apollo Brown; The Audible Doctor; B.C. Einstein; Billy Loman; Black Milk; Buckwild; Evidence; Hazardis Soundz; J57; Jon Glass; Large Professor; MoSS; Nottz; Numonics; Pro Logic; Rain; Relentless; Shortfyuz; Statik Selektah; StreetRunner; The S.U.I.C.I.D.E. S.Q.U.A.D.; Vinyl Villain

Reks chronology
Eyes Watching God (2014)	The Greatest X (2016)

The Greatest X (pronounced as "The Greatest Unknown") is the tenth studio album by American hip hop recording artist Reks. It was released on September 9, 2016, by Brick Records. The album features guest appearances from artists such as Termanology, Jared Evan, Edo G, R.A. the Rugged Man, Planet Asia and Guilty Simpson, among others. The album's production was handled by several producers, including Large Professor, The Alchemist, Nottz, Buckwild, Black Milk, Apollo Brown, Statik Selektah and The Audible Doctor.

== Track listing ==
Disc one
No.	Title	Producer(s)	Length
1.	"The Greatest Intro"	The S.U.I.C.I.D.E. S.Q.U.A.D.	1:28
2.	"A.N.O.N.Y.M.O.U.S."	Statik Selektah	2:30
3.	"Hands Up (Wink Wink)"	StreetRunner	2:33
4.	"Jump Shots" (featuring Statik Selektah)	Buckwild	4:14
5.	"Plane Gang" (featuring Akrobatik, Edo G, Termanology and DJ Deadeye)	The Audible Doctor	3:46
6.	"The Greatest" (featuring Jared Evan)	The Arcitype	4:04
7.	"Surrounded" (featuring Dutch ReBelle, Alias and EzDread)	The Arcitype	3:52
8.	"Liberation"	Black Milk	3:24
9.	"Gone Baby Gone"	Large Professor	2:52
10.	"The Recipe" (featuring DJ Kerosene)	Nottz	2:34
11.	"Unknown"	Nottz	3:08
12.	"B.E.E.F." (featuring N.B.S.)	75 Crates	3:18
13.	"LL Cool J"	The Audible Doctor	2:28
14.	"Good Women, Thot Bitches" (featuring Termanology)	Billy Loman	3:39
15.	"The Promise"	Jon Glass; Vinyl Villain	3:17
16.	"Pray for Me: The Genocide Note"	Statik Selektah	3:04
17.	"My Dark Skin (Revisited)"	The Audible Doctor	2:29
18.	"Benjamin Button"	Rain	3:15

Disc two
No.	Title	Producer(s)	Length
1.	"Impression, Sunrise"	MoSS; Pro Logic	3:15
2.	"EgoTrippen" (featuring DJ Heron)	Evidence	3:58
3.	"Bitch Slap" (featuring R.A. the Rugged Man)	The Arcitype	4:08
4.	"Kites"	The Alchemist	3:37
5.	"Future Kings" (featuring Cassius the 5th)	Apollo Brown	3:39
6.	"H.I.P.H.O.P."	Apollo Brown	2:50
7.	"Final Four 2" (featuring Ea$y Money, Planet Asia, Rasco, Reef the Lost Cauze, King Magnetic, Phat Kat, Guilty Simpson and DJ 7L)	The Audible Doctor	5:38
8.	"Eye in the Sky" (featuring No Doz and Ripshop)	The Audible Doctor	3:45
9.	"Loud" (featuring Lucky Dice)	Numonics	4:14
10.	"Massachusetts" (featuring Mr. Fritz and Lucky Dice)	Numonics	4:03
11.	"Twenty4Seven3SixFive"	B.C. Einstein	3:22
12.	"1980" (featuring Jaysaun and TriState)	The Audible Doctor	3:34
13.	"Cigarettes 2" (featuring ColdShold)	Relentless	3:53
14.	"Intuition"	J57	2:48
15.	"Worldview" (featuring Supnate and Moe Pope)	Shortfyuz	4:07
16.	"Back Home" (featuring Spnda, Bakari J.B. and Kay-R)	Shortfyuz	3:48
17.	"Yesterday/Today/Tomorrow"	Hazardis Soundz	4:49
