= DJ Brace =

Canadian DJ (born 1980)

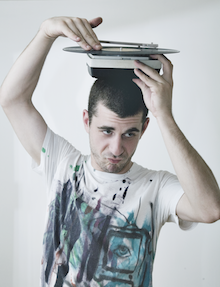

Background information
- Born: Michael Topf; 1980 (age 45–46); Winnipeg, Manitoba, Canada
- Genres: Instrumental hip-hop, turntablism
- Occupation: Musician
- Instrument: Turntable
- Years active: 1998–present

Michael Topf (born 1980), records under the name DJ Brace, is a Canadian DJ and producer. He is the winner of multiple awards, including the 2016 DMC Online DJ Championship. He has released music through Balanced Records, ESL Music, Nostomania Records, Switchstance Recordings and Costume Records. DJ Brace collaborates with Soul Khan, Ancient Astronauts, Kabanjak, Dubmatix, Vekked and various other artists. His music can also be heard on the Fox TV series Prison Break and on the Canadian TV channel CBC.

== Awards ==
- 2017 DMC World Online Team DJ Champion [The Fresherthans]
- 2016 DMC World Online Champion
- 2016 WMC DJ Spin-Off Champion [Scratch Category]
- 2015 DMC World Online Team DJ Champion [The Fresherthans]
- 2015 B4B Online Scratch Battle Canadian Champion
- 2013 Kid Koala 8-Bit Blues battle Champion
- 2011 Felix award nomination for "DJ Brace presents The Electric Nosehair Orchestra in Synesthasia" in the category of Electronic album of the year.
- 2009 Juno Award for DJ Brace presents The Electric Nosehair Orchestra in Nostomania
- 2004 DMC Canada Champion

== Discography ==
=== Solo projects ===
- 2008: Nostomania
- 2010: Synesthasia (NR02-∞)
- 2017: Apatheia (NR26-∞)

=== EPs and singles ===
- 2009: DJ Brace featuring Brown Bag AllStars - Everyday (NR01-∞)
- 2012: Koncept - Watch The Skyfall EP (NR06-∞)
- 2012: Kabanjak & DJ Brace - Abra Kabra (SRDR 019)
- 2016: DJ Brace - Close Cuts (Fresherthan Records)
- 2016: Hard Luck Banjoes (Soul Khan & DJ Brace) - "Once Again" (Independent)
- 2016: DJ Brace - SMH (Costume Records)
- 2017: DJ Brace - Beyond EP (Costume Records)

=== Collaborations ===
- 2005: Gruf & DJ Brace - Soundbarriers (Independent)
- 2009: Cain.1 & DJ Brace - "Slammed" - Northern Faction 4 (Balanced Records) - BCD2008-13
- 2009: Birdapres & DJ Brace - Raw (NR00-∞)
- 2011: Brown Bag AllStars – Brown Bag Season Vol. 1 (NR04-∞)
- 2013: Various - DJ Brace presents The Electric Nosehair Orchestra Remixed (NR12-∞)

=== Remixes ===
- 2009: Ancient Astronauts featuring the Pharcyde - "Classic DJ Brace Remix" (ESL 155)
- 2011: Dubmatix - "Deep Dark Dub" (DJ Brace Remix) (CCT3025-2)
- 2012: Ancient Astronauts – "Still A Soldier DJ Brace Remix" (ESL 197)

=== Appearances ===
- 2010: J57 - Digital Society (BEP2010-15)
- 2010: Kabanjak - Tree Of Mystery (ESL 166)
- 2011: Cella Chest - Cella Chest (NR05-∞)
- 2011: maticulous - The maticulous EP (MSM001)
- 2012: J57 - 2057 EP
- 2012: The Audible Doctor - I Think That
- 2019 Abraham Inc - Together We Stand
