= SoulStice =

American rapper

Ashley J. Llorens (born in 1979 in Chicago, Illinois), known professionally as SoulStice, is an American rapper. He started seriously pursuing music while earning his B.S. and M.S. at the University of Illinois Urbana-Champaign. In 2003, SoulStice founded the independent label, Wandering Soul Records, concurrently with the release of his first album, North by Northwest.

Since the release of his 2003 debut album. SoulStice has become a prominent figure on the alternative hip hop scene. In early 2006, SoulStice and Wandering Soul Records signed a national distribution deal through EMI/Caroline to release the album "Dark Water" by his group Wade Waters. In 2007, SoulStice released his second solo album, "Dead Letter Perfect" which was distributed through Universal Music. Garnering significant radio support, "Dead Letter Perfect" led to tours in Europe and Japan as well as coverage in XXL Magazine, The Source, URB, Scratch and most other tastemaker hip hop publications. In 2009, SoulStice released "Beyond Borders," a collaboration project with Belgian beatmaker SBe, that featured artists from around the globe. His song, "That Thang" was featured in the Oscar-Nominated film, "The Blind Side" starring Sandra Bullock, and his song "Always" was featured on the CBS hit show NCIS Los Angeles.

== Discography ==
Albums/mixtapes

- North by Northwest, (2003, Wandering Soul)
- North by Northwest: Solid Ground, (2005, Wandering Soul)
- Return of the Kings, (2006, Wandering Soul)
- Dark Water, (2006, Wandering Soul)
- Dead Letter Perfect, (2007, Wandering Soul)
- Beyond Borders, (2009, Wandering Soul)

12" singles

- The Melody, (2003, Wandering Soul)
- Always / The Quickening, (2005, Wandering Soul)
- Rock Solid feat. Cuban Link, (2005, Wandering Soul)
- Speak On It feat. AZ, (2006, Wandering Soul)
- Be Perfect, (2007, Wandering Soul)
- Bird's Eye View feat. Kev Brown, (2008, Wandering Soul)
- World Star feat. Zap Mama, (2009, Wandering Soul)
- Strange Kinda Love feat. Monique Harcum, (2009, Wandering Soul)
