= Fuel TV =

Fuel TV may refer to:

- Fuel TV (international), a sports channel offered in Australia, EMEA and other countries.
- Fox Sports 2, an American sports channel known as Fuel TV from 2003 to 2013.
