= DJ Concept =

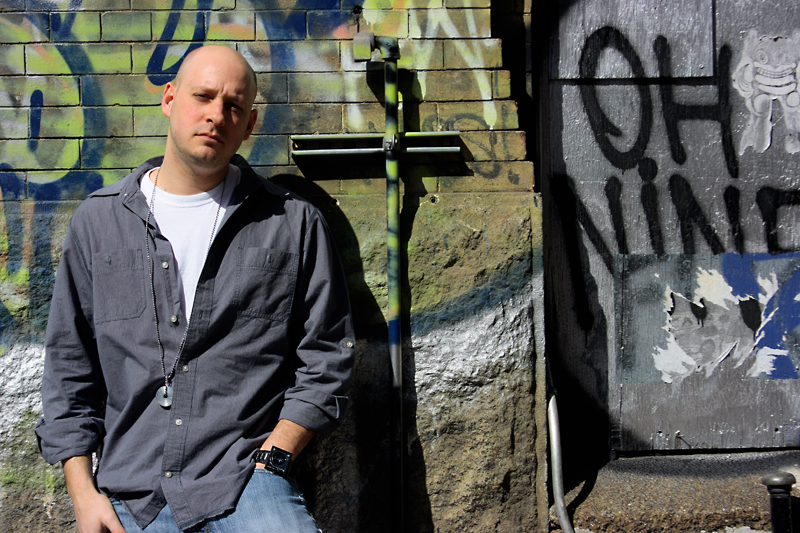

Background information
- Origin: Long Island, New York, United States
- Genre: Hip Hop
- Occupations: DJ, producer
- Years active: 1995-present
- Label: Independent
- Website: crisiscentercollective.com

DJ Concept is DJ and music producer from Long Island, New York. He is the co-founder of The Bash Brothers DJ Crew along with DJ Mickey Knox.

== Biography ==
Between 2001 & 2007, Concept linked up with producer/mc Undefined to form the group Crisis Center. They put out 2 records: Volume 1 & Version 2.0 & won a best rap duo award at The Underground Music Awards in NYC. Concept was also the host of the Nationwide hip hop mixshow, The Mix Chronicles, on Sirius Satellite Radio. His debut album, Heavy Smoke, was released in May 2010. The entire album is produced by Concept. After Heavy Smoke, he released a few EPs with different MCs as well as a number of conceptual beat tapes, including one made completely on one flight from JFK to LAX. Concept is also one half of the NY rap duo Dirt Disciples with Rome Clientel

== Discography ==
ALBUMS/RELEASES:

- 2021 - Audio Cinematography (Various Artists)
- 2020 - Twas The Night (Deluxe Version)
- 2020 - This Glorious Nightmare (Instrumentals)
- 2020 - 24 FPS 003: Beautiful (Instrumentals)
- 2020 - Stash (Tape 1) (Instrumentals)
- 2020 - Crime Laboratory 1 (2/ J. Depina)
- 2019 - 24 FPS 002: On My Mind (Instrumentals)
- 2019 - Prolific (Instrumentals)
- 2019 - Prolific
- 2019 - 24 FPS 001: Love Your Life (Instrumentals)
- 2018 - Meditations 3 (Instrumentals)
- 2018 - Songs From The Catalog, Vol. 2
- 2018 - Good Friday (w/ John Jigg$)
- 2018 - Meditations 2 (Instrumentals)
- 2018 - Songs From The Catalog, Vol. 1
- 2018 - Stand For Something (Dirt Disciples Album)
- 2018 - Seventy Nine (Instrumentals) (w/ Planet Asia)
- 2018 - Meditations (Instrumentals)
- 2018 - Young Baby Father (Instrumentals)
- 2016 - Flight Patterns 2 (Beat Tape)
- 2016 - Seventy Nine (w/ Planet Asia)
- 2015 - Twas The Night (Beat Tape)
- 2015 - The Ambition EP (Dirt Disciples)
- 2014 - Rome Clientel X DJ Concept Are Dirt Disciples (Bonus Edition)
- 2014 - Rome Clientel X DJ Concept Are Dirt Disciples (Hand Stamped - Limited Edition CD)
- 2013 - Young Baby father EP w/ Peter Leo
- 2012 - Sonidos Para Tu Alma (Beat Tape)
- 2012 - This Glorious Nightmare w/ The Nezitiq Mute
- 2012 - Heavy Smoke (Deluxe Version)
- 2012 - Flight Patterns (Beat Tape)
- 2011 - M99: Dexter Beat Tape
- 2011 - Heavy Smoke
- 2010 - The BYOB LP (With DJ Mickey Knox)
- 2010 - The BYOB EP (With DJ Mickey Knox)
- Crisis Center - Version 2.0 (12")
- Crisis Center - Volume 1 (12")

== Production credits ==
- 2018 - Keith Murray & Canibus - "No Brainer (DJ Concept Remix)"
- 2018 - DJ Mickey Knox f. Tha God Fahim - "Up In Space"
- 2018 - PR Dean f. 38 Spesh, Profit & Rome Streets - "Blacktop Spitters"
- 2018 - Blu / Med / Oh No - "The Turn Up Remix"
- 2017 - Nature - "Throw It Up Remix"
- 2017 - Dirt Disciples f. Dominique Larue & Ice Grill - "Know What It Seems Like"
- 2017 - Mike Delorean f. Ali Vegas - "Mac In The Engine"
- 2017 - Typ iLL - "Another Day Another Dollar" (Off 30 Days)
- 2017 - GH - "Eyes So Low Remix f. Easy Money" (Off Don't Come Down That One Way)
- 2017 - GH - "Dirty Pianos" (Off Don't Come Down That One Way)
- 2017 - GH - "City Of Champions" (Off Don't Come Down That One Way)
- 2016 - Dirt Disciples - "Hologram" (Off Opportunity Knox Vol. 3)
- 2016 - DJ Concept - "Flight Patterns 2 Beat Tape" [Entirely Produced By DJ Concept]
- 2016 - Planet Asia & DJ Concept - "Seventy Nine" [Entirely Produced By DJ Concept]
- 2015 - DJ Concept - "Twas The Night Beat Tape" [Entirely Produced By DJ Concept]
- 2015 - Ghetto f. Smoke DZA & REKS - "Ain't Even Illegal (DJ Concept Remix)"
- 2015 - Dirt Disciples - The Ambition EP
- 2015 - Ruc Da Jackel - "World Of Lies" (Off Henny & Coke EP)
- 2015 - John Jigg$ - "Blown Away" (Off 51631 EP)
- 2015 - Bridgette Angelique - "Come On Home" (Off Heart Of A Champion EP)
- 2014 - Dirt Disciples - "Heartless"
- 2014 - Rome Clientel X DJ Concept Are Dirt Disciples
- 2014 - Nutso & Blaq Poet - "Let The Guns Blow Remix" (Off Opportunity Knox Vol. 2)
- 2014 - The Day Laborers & Eternia - "Long Day's Night" (Off Opportunity Knox Vol. 2)
- 2014 - Kaleber, Stat Quo & Jon Connor - "Hip Hop Remix" (Off Opportunity Knox Vol. 2)
- 2014 - Nature - "Timberland Season Outro" (Off Seasons Changed: Winter EP)
- 2014 - Nature - "Cold America Intro" (Off Seasons Changed: Winter EP)
- 2014 - Rome Clientel f. Chaundon - "Love Is Love" (Off Stars Earn Stripes)
- 2013 - Nature f. Fred the Godson - "Big Blunts" (Off Seasons Changed: Fall EP)
- 2013 - Typ iLL - "Godly Bounce" (Off Basic Training EP)
- 2013 - Rome Clientel f. Realm Reality & Skyzoo - "Champions" (Off The Empire 3: The Coronation)
- 2013 - Peter Leo X DJ Concept - "Young Baby Father" [Entirely Produced By DJ Concept]
- 2013 - Nature f. Cormega & Tommy 2 Face - "Summer Breeze" (Off Seasons Changed: Summer EP)
- 2013 - Nature f. DOE - "Never Falling Off" (Off Seasons Changed: Spring EP)
- 2013 - Ghetto - "F*ck Wit U" (Off Chain Smoking)
- 2013 - The Day Laborers f. Homeboy Sandman & P.So - "Pretzel Chips [DJ Concept Remix]" (Off The Album The Pretzel Chips EP)
- 2012 - DJ Concept f. Tools & Famoso - "Industry Morgues"
- 2012 - DJ Mickey Knox f. Thad Reid, Jon Hope, 6th Sense - "Fatal Attraction Remix" (Off The Album All For The Love)
- 2012 - Nutso f. Starvin, AG Da Coroner, Shaz IllYork, Blacastan, Spit Gemz - "Verbal Flood" (Off The Album Behind These Bars)
- 2012 - Peter Leo, The Kid Daytona, Little Vic, AC - "Next Thrill" (Off The Album Opportunity Knox Vol. 1)
- 2012 - DJ Concept - "Sonidos Para Tu Alma" [Entirely Produced By DJ Concept]
- 2012 - DJ Concept - "Heavy Smoke [Deluxe Version]" [Entirely Produced By DJ Concept]
- 2012 - DJ Concept - "Flight Patterns Beat Tape" [Entirely Produced By DJ Concept]
- 2012 - Typ iLL - "Intro To Concept" & "Reincarnated" (Off The Album Now Or Never)
- 2011 - Wais P - "So Bad"
- 2011 - DJ Concept - "M99: Dexter Beat Tape [Entirely Produced By DJ Concept]"
- 2011 - DJ Concept f. Shabaam Sahdeeq, El Gant, FaMo$o, Nutso, FT, Bekay, Dov, Flo, 151 Proof & Climax - "Southpaw Cypher"
- 2011 - The Day Laborers f. Bridgette Angelique - "Journey To The Sky (Off The Blast Off EP)"
- 2011 - Various Artists - "Heavy Smoke [Entirely Produced By DJ Concept]"
- 2011 - AC - "Charlie Sheen [The Tiger Blood Remix]"
- 2010 - Kaleber - "Sundown [DJ Concept Remix]" (Off The BYOB LP)
- 2009 - Famoso - "At Odds"
- 2007 - Kaleber - "Hood Stripes Pt. 2" (Off the album The Anomaly)

== Mixtapes ==
All of his promo mixtapes are available free to download

- 2017 - DJ Concept - RIP Prodigy (A Live Mix Of Dusty Infamous Originals)
- 2012 - DJ Concept / Famoso - Before The Dope Comes
- 2012 - DJ Concept - The J57 Collection
- 2011 - DJ Concept - Back2Kris
- 2010 - DJ Concept & DJ Mickey Knox - Kaleber Origins: A History Of Rhymin' Pt. 2
- 2010 - DJ Concept & DJ Dutchmaster - BallerStatus Presents: Kevin Nottingham's A3C Showcase Mixtape
- 2010 - DJ Concept - Lefty & Tab One: Monsters Ink
- 2010 - DJ Concept - Mic Fiends Tour Mixtape (For The Reef The Lost Cauze & Lefty West Coast Tour)
- 2010 - DJ Concept & DJ Dutchmaster - North By Northeast: NXNE (The Southwest Invasion)
- 2010 - DJ Concept - Theodore - A Live Tribute Set
- 2009 - Lefty & DJ Concept: Gangland Vol. 4 (American Nightmare)
- 2009 - DJ Concept - The Chemical Formula (Hosted By: The Alchemist)
- 2009 - DJ Concept - [PRIMO] On Fire
- 2009 - Chaundon & DJ Concept - Black Dynamite
- 2009 - Last Emperor - Science Team…Go! Mixtape / Mixed By: DJ Mickey Knox & DJ Concept
- 2009 - DJ Concept & Shuko - Ecko Unlimited Edition - Vol. 3 - Hosted By: Buckshot
- 2009 - DJ Concept - Tore Down: A Tribute To St. Ides & Many Other Fine Beverages
- 2009 - DJ Concept - Armed & Dangerous: Selected Cuts From Torae & Marco Polo
- 2009 - DJ Concept - Soundset 09′: The Mixtape
- 2009 - DJ Concept & Shuko: Ecko Unlimited Edition - Vol. 2 - Hosted By: Rapper Big Pooh
- 2009 - illroots + the bash brothers present: DJ CONCEPT - ILLUMINATI
- 2009 - DJ Concept & Lefty present: Gangland 3 (The Young Misguided)
- 2009 - DJ Concept - In Your System (R.I.P. Dilla)
- 2009 - Pennant Race Presents: DJ Concept - The Courtside Coast To Coast Mixtape
- 2009 - DJ.Concept & Shuko - Ecko Unlimited Edition - Volume 1 - Hosted By: Stat Quo (Germany Edition)
- 2009 - DJ Concept & Shuko - Ecko Unlimited Edition - Vol. 1 (Denmark Edition) - Hosted By: Stat Quo
- 2009 - DJ Concept & Shuko - Ecko Unlimited Edition - Vol. 1 (Holland Edition) - Hosted By: Stat Quo
- 2009 - DJ Concept - Three Kings - Hosted By: Skyzoo, Chaundon & Torae
- 2009 - DJ Concept - ONE [Good Thing About Music] : A Bob Marley Celebration
- 2009 - DJ Mickey Knox & DJ Concept Present: Undefined: The Manual Labor Sessions
- 2009 - DJ Concept - The Beautiful Fascination With 45's - Stack Number 1
- 2008 - DJ Concept - 2120 S. Michigan Avenue: Legendary Blues Music
- 2008 - DJ.Concept - Jimi Hendrix: A Tribute To Experience
- 2008 - DJ.Concept - Change Is Now Mixtape
- 2008 - Underground Instrumentals Vol. 2 - DJ Concept & DJ Mickey Knox
- 2008 - Tools - Precious Metals - Mixed By DJ Concept
- 2008 - DJ Concept - Music Is Life, Pt. 1
- 2008 - DJ Concept - Music Is Life, Pt. 2
- 2008 - DJ Concept & DJ Mickey Knox - The Mix Chronicles Freestyle Sessions, Vol. 1
- 2008 - DJ Concept - It's Grover - Live On W.E.X.E
- 2008 - DJ Concept - Live & Direct, Episode 4 on W.E.X.E.
- 2008 - DJ Concept - Live & Direct, Episode 3 on W.E.X.E.
- 2008 - DJ Concept - Live & Direct, Episode 2 on W.E.X.E.
- 2008 - DJ Concept - Live & Direct, Episode 1 on W.E.X.E.
- 2007 - DJ Concept - The Immortal J-Dilla (Live Set)
- 2006 - DJ Concept - The Wax 42 Mixtape - R.I.P.
- 2006 - DJ Concept - Smoke Out Session
- 2004 - Crisis Center Presents: HARVARD BLUE - Fuck Your Favorite Rapper
- 2004 - DJ Concept & Shuko - Street Hustle Volume 1 ( Hosted By: A-Mafia of Dispet)
- 2003 - DJ Concept - Queensbridge General - The Best Of Nas
- 2003 - DJ Concept - Hot Winter Hosted By Capone
- 2003 - DJ Concept - The Connex List Mixtape
- 2002 - DJ Concept - Rawkus Treats
- 2002 - DJ Concept - The Takeover Mixtape
- 2001 - DJ Concept - The Focus Mixtape
- 2001 - DJ Concept - Heavy Rotation 1
- 2001 - DJ Concept - The Best Of Cage & Necro
- 2001 - DJ Concept - More Than A Woman: The Best Of Aaliyah
- 2001 - DJ Concept - Up In Smoke
- 1999 - DJ Concept - Vintage Special Sauce
- 1999 - DJ Concept - Special Sauce Radio - Volume 1
- 1999 - DJ Concept - Special Sauce Radio - Volume 2
- 1999 - DJ Concept - Special Sauce Radio - Volume 3

THE EXECUTE PODCAST - 2008–Present

- The Lost Chronicles - Show 9
- The Lost Chronicles - Show 8
- The Lost Chronicles - Show 7
- The Lost Chronicles - Show 6
- The Lost Chronicles - Show 5
- The Lost Chronicles - Show 4
- The Lost Chronicles - Show 3
- The Lost Chronicles - Show 2
- The Lost Chronicles - Show 1
- The Bash Brothers Unite - New York To The Bay
- Spit.Fire, Part 1
- Spit.Fire, Part 2
- Spit.Fire, Part 3
- DJ Concept & DJ Mickey Knox - A History Of Rhymin' (The Best Of Kaleber)
- Fat Beats Jump Off, Mix 001
- From The Collection, Episode 3
- Best Of: Hi-Tek Edition (Hosted By Hi-Tek)
- New Wax, Episode 3
- From The Collection, Episode 2

== Affiliations and groups ==
- The Bash Brothers (DJ Crew)
- Crisis Center (with Undefined)
- Dirt Disciples (with Rome Clientel)
