= Fuel (journal) =

Scientific journal

- Discipline: Fuel
- Language: English
- Edited by: Bill Nimmo

Publication details
- Former name(s): Fuel in Science and Practice
- History: 1922–present
- Publisher: Elsevier
- Frequency: Biweekly
- Impact factor: 7.4 (2022)

Standard abbreviations
- ISO 4: Fuel

Indexing
- CODEN: FUELAC
- ISSN: 0016-2361 (print); 1873-7153 (web)
- LCCN: 29006976
- OCLC no.: 829719572

Links
- Journal homepage; Online archive

Fuel is a biweekly peer-reviewed scientific journal covering research on fuel. It was established in 1922 and published by Butterworths Scientific Publications as Fuel in Science and Practice, obtaining its current name in 1948. It is published by Elsevier and the editor-in-chief is Bill Nimmo (University of Sheffield).

== Abstracting and indexing ==
The journal is abstracted and indexed in:

- Chemical Abstracts Service
- Current Contents/Engineering, Computing & Technology
- Current Contents/Physical, Chemical & Earth Sciences
- EBSCO databases
- Ei Compendex
- Inspec
- Science Citation Index Expanded
- Scopus

According to the Journal Citation Reports, the journal has a 2022 impact factor of 7.4.
