= The Fuel =

EP by Koncept and J57
- Released: November 20, 2015
- Recorded: 2014–15
- Genre: Hip hop, pop, rap
- Length: 30:29
- Label: KON57
- Producer: J57

Koncept chronology
Malt Disney (J57 Remix) (2013)	The Fuel (2015)

J57 chronology
The Sample-Free Remix (2015)	The Fuel (2015)	There’s No I in Antcs (2016)

Singles from The Fuel
- 1. "Porcelain" Released: October 17, 2015; 2. "The Fuel" Released: October 29, 2015; 3. "Excitement" Released: October 18, 2015; 4. "Crazy is Beautiful" Released: October 16, 2015

The Fuel is a collaborative EP by Brooklyn-based rappers Koncept and J57. Released through KON57 Records, the EP features vocal appearances from Hollis, Akie Bermiss, The Grand Concourse, Dice Raw, Denitia, Andrew Thomas Reid and Nevaeh.

== Background ==
The Fuel was started as a project in 2014. The release date of the EP was announced via online media followed by its cover art and track list. It was released on 20 November 2015 through Koncept and J57's imprint called Kon57 Records via Soulspazm Distribution on iTunes.

== Critical reception ==
The Fuel was received to critical and positive review among music critics. KC Orcutt of The Source gave it a favorable review stating that, “The Fuel EP is an underground soundtrack for warriors...J57's top notch big stadium production and Koncept's deeply personal lyrics makes The Fuel feel-good music for the people who always root for the underdogs”.

== Singles ==
On 25 September 2015, "Porcelain" was released as the first official single off the EP featuring vocals from Hollis. The video for "Porcelain" was shot on the Oregon Coast by Jesse Vinton. "The Fuel" was released as the second single off the EP followed by "Crazy is Beautiful" and "Excitement" which featured vocals from Nevaeh and Andrew Thomas Reid respectively.

== Track listing ==
No.	Title	Length
1.	"Porcelain" (featuring Hollis)	3:52
2.	"The Fuel" (featuring Akie Bermiss)	3:13
3.	"Excitement" (featuring Andrew Thomas Reid)	3:57
4.	"Crazy Is Beautiful" (featuring Nevaeh)	4:07
5.	"Live Forever" (featuring Dice Raw)	3:38
6.	"Jump" (featuring Akie Bermiss)	4:14
7.	"Patience" (featuring Denitia)	3:32
8.	"Plane Ticket" (featuring The Grand Concourse)	3:52

== Release history ==
Country	Date	Format	Label
United States	November 20, 2015	Digital download	KON57 Records

== Personnel ==
- Keith Whitehead – primary artiste
- James Heinz – producer
- Hollis Wear-Wong – featured artiste
- Akie Bermiss – featured artiste
- Nevaeh – featured artiste
- Denitia Odigie – featured artiste
- The Grand Concourse – featured artiste
- Karl Jerkins – featured artiste
- Andrew Thomas Reid – featured artiste
