= Brown Bag AllStars =

American hip hop group

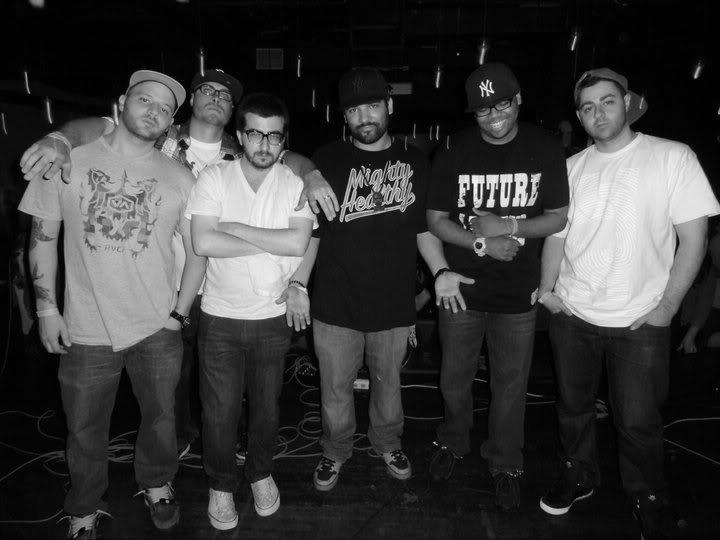
- Brown Bag AllStars at the "Brown Bag Season" CD release show in New York City in 2012

Background information
- Also known as: BBAS
- Origin: Brooklyn, New York City, U.S.
- Genres: Hip hop; East Coast hip hop; electronic; R&B
- Instrument(s): Vocals, turntables
- Years active: 2007–present
- Labels: Coalmine Records; Brown Bag Records; Soulspazm Records
- Members: J57; The Audible Doctor; Soul Khan; DeeJay Element; DJ E Holla
- Past members: DJ Goo; Cold Codeine; Koncept
- Website: brownbagallstars.com

The Brown Bag AllStars is an American rap group made up of J57, The Audible Doctor, Soul Khan, DeeJay Element and DJ E Holla. The group's repertoire of East Coast hip hop and underground hip hop blended with hard-core rap lyrics won them a spot in AllHipHop 's 2013 list of "Top 50 In Underground Hip-Hop".

== Career ==
=== Early beginnings ===
The Brown Bag AllStars was formed in 2007 while its members were working and interning at Fat Beats. Koncept, Soul Khan and Cold Codeine were writing verses and freestyling on beats made by J57 and The Audible Doctor at Jesse Shatkin's studio until they went on to release their debut project titled The Brown Tape.

=== Later life ===
On 4 August 2009 while at Fat Beats, the Brown Bag AllStars released their debut mixtape titled The Brown Tape, released through Coalmine Records. The Brown Bag AllStars made an applaudable guest performance at the 2009 Brooklyn Hip-Hop Festival. In 2010, The Traveller and The Down Under Remixes EPs were released.

In 2011, the first of their annual end-of-the-year A Year In Review compilation serial was released before they went on to release Brown Bag Season Vol. 1 which featured guest and vocal appearances from DJ Brace, Marco Polo. On 5 January 2015, they released the fourth A Year In Review compilation which featured notable acts like 50 Cent, Young Buck, Smoke DZA, Cage, DJ Rhettmatic, Phantogram and Pharoahe Monch.

== Discography ==
=== Mixtapes ===
Mixtapes by Brown Bag AllStars
| Year | Title | Release details |
|---|---|---|
| 2008 | The Brown Bag Tape | Released: 2008; Label: Brown Bag Records; Format: Digital download |
| 2009 | The Brown Bag Tape (Deluxe Edition) | Released: 2009; Label: Coalmine Records; Format: Digital download |
| 2012 | 2011: A Year In Review | Released: 1 January 2012; Label: Brown Bag Records; Format: Digital download |
| 2013 | 2012: A Year In Review | Released: 1 January 2013; Label: Brown Bag Records; Format: Digital download |
| 2014 | 2013: A Year In Review | Released: 1 January 2014; Label: Brown Bag Records; Format: Digital download |
| 2015 | 2014: A Year In Review | Released: 1 January 2015; Label: Brown Bag Records; Format: Digital download |

=== Singles & EP's ===
Singles & EP's by Brown Bag AllStars
| Year | Title | Release details |
|---|---|---|
| 2011 | Traveler EP | Released: 20 January 2010; Label: Fat Beats; Format: 12" Vinyl |
| 2017 | 11 Steps | Released: 31 May 2017; Label: Brown Bag Records; Format: Digital download |
| 2017 | Beerz | Released: 12 July 2017; Label: Brown Bag Records; Format: Digital download |

=== Albums ===
Albums by Brown Bag AllStars
| Year | Title | Release details |
|---|---|---|
| 2014 | Brown Label Part 1& 2 | Released: 4 March 2014; Label: Brown Bag Records/Soulspazm; Format: CD & Digital download |
| 2016 | BlaQ Coffee (with Q-Unique) | Released: 29 November 2016; Label: Capital Q Records; Format: CDR & Digital download |

=== Compilations ===
Compilations by Brown Bag AllStars
| Year | Title | Release details |
|---|---|---|
| 2011 | Brown Bag Season Vol. 1 | Released: 17 May 2011; Label: Nostomania Records; Format: CD |
| 2011 | Brown Bag Season Vol 1 (DJ Brace Remixes) | Released: 17 May 2011; Label: Nostomania Records; Format: CD |
| 2013 | 10x | Released: 18 February 2013; Label: Brown Bag Records; Format: Digital download |

=== Guest appearances ===
| Year | Title | Chart positions | | Album |
| Year | Title | US | US Hip-Hop | Album |
|---|---|---|---|---|
| 2009 | " NY to JPN" (Prisma featuring Brown Bag AllStars) | — | — | Prisma |
| 2009 | "Men of Respect" (Hannibal King featuring Brown Bag AllStars) | — | — | Eating Cornbread on the Millenium Falcon |
| 2010 | "Everyday" (DJ Brace featuring Brown Bag AllStars) | — | — | Non-album single |
| 2011 | "Hung Over" (DJ JS-1 featuring Brown Bag AllStars) | — | — | Ground Original 3: No One Cares |
| 2012 | "What It's All About" (M-Phazes featuring Brown Bag AllStars & DJ Brace) | — | — | Phazed Out |
| 2012 | "Days Still Turn to Night" (J57 featuring ATR & Brown Bag AllStars) | — | — | The Ports EP |
| 2013 | "Broken 40 Bottles" (Undefined featuring Brown Bag AllStars) | — | — | Certified A-Side |
