= Soul Khan =

American songwriter, rapper and retired battle rapper

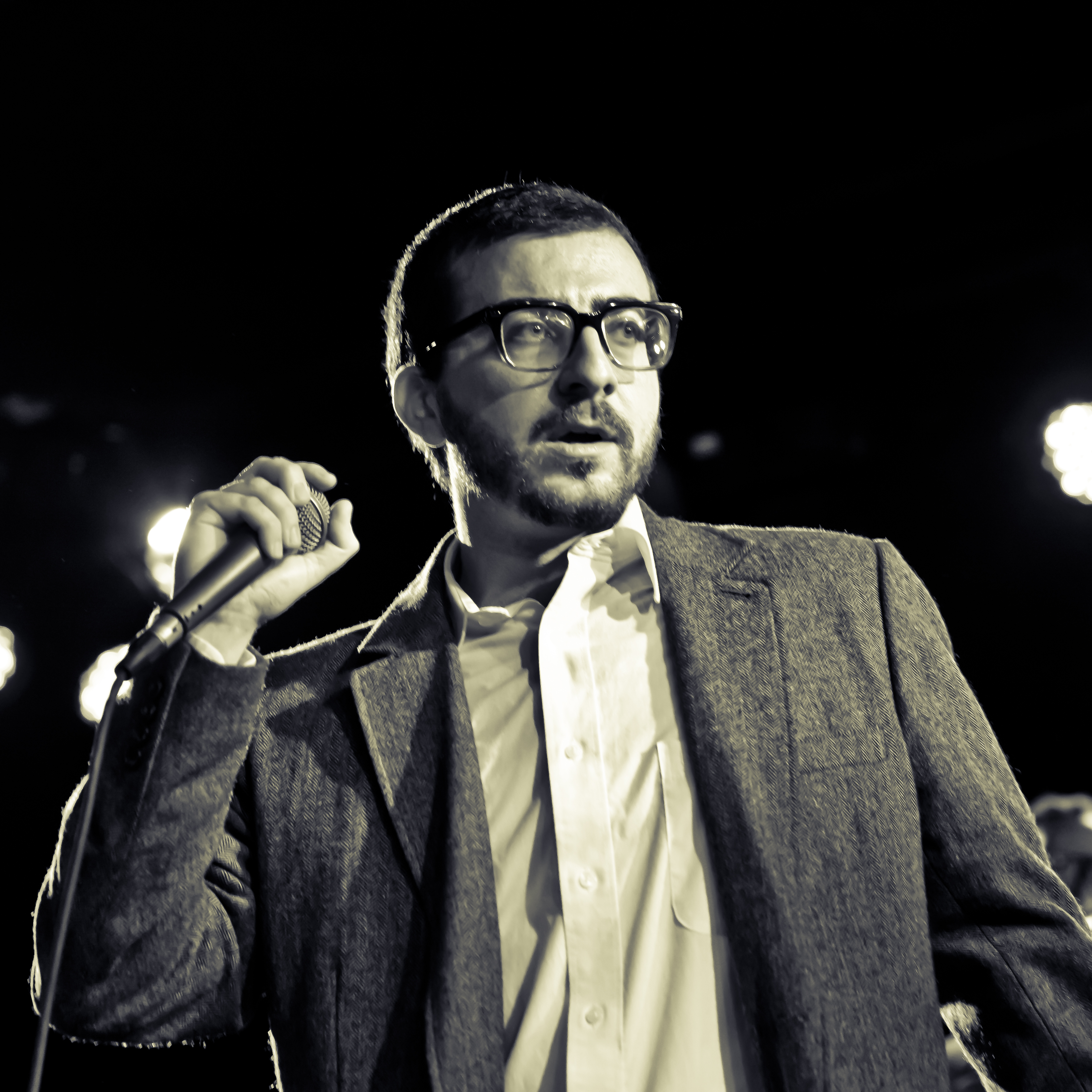
- Soul Khan performing live

Background information
- Born: Noah Weston; April 18, 1985 (age 41); West Hollywood, California, U.S.
- Origin: Woodland Hills, Los Angeles, U.S.
- Genre: Hip hop
- Occupations: Rapper; songwriter
- Years active: 2010–present
- Label: Independent
- Website: http://soulkhan.com

Noah Weston, better known as Soul Khan (born April 18, 1985) is an American rapper and songwriter. Born in West Hollywood and raised in Woodland Hills, California. He currently resides in Brooklyn, New York City. After a short career in battle rap that started in late 2008, in which he appeared in American circuits such as Grindtime and Smack/URL, as well as outside the United States, notably in Canada (KOTD) and United Kingdom (Don't Flop), he retired from the scene to focus his attention on his musical career in early 2010. He is a member of the Brown Bag AllStars, a collective of emcees and producers from the Brooklyn area.

== Music career ==
Soul Khan began battle rapping in 2008 and retired in 2010. After retiring from battle rap, Soul Khan became outspoken about his regret over using language that many consider offensive to marginalized groups like the LGBT community and women. Since as early as 2012, he has expressed his remorse on social media. In January 2020, Soul Khan returned to battle rap for a one-time performance against Dizaster in the King of the Dot league. At the end of 2022, Soul Khan returned for another battle rap performance against A Ward on iBattleTV. Since then he has announced he will be participating in more battle rap events.

Soul Khan met his current group, The Brown Bag Allstars, while working at Fat Beats in New York City. In late 2010, Soul Khan released his free album Soul Like Khan. The following year, he started releasing his Love Supreme series, four EPs in dedication to John Coltrane's legendary album by the same name, A Love Supreme. The first EP, Acknowledgement was produced by DeeJay Element with an upbeat approach to help listeners feel "renewed." The second EP, Resolution, was produced by Marink. Pursuance EP, produced by Audible Doctor is the third and Psalm, produced by Abnormal completed the series. Soul Khan's song "Speeding Bullets" was also on the 2012 compilation album College Radio Day.

Soul Khan performed at 2013 Bonnaroo with Black Violin, Jeni Suk, & Knower as the collective "Sooper Groop.". Soul Khan lists Pharoahe Monch, Posdnuos, Paul Robeson, & David Ruffin as musical influences.

Soul Khan was listed in Allhiphop's Top 50 Underground Hip Hop Artists of 2012.

== Politics ==
In February 2022, Soul Khan announced his candidacy for the New York State Democratic Committee.

He is a member of the Democratic Socialists of America.

== Discography ==
=== Studio albums ===
- Soul Like Khan (2010)

=== EPs ===
- Acknowledgement (2011)
- Resolution (2011)
- Pursuance (2011)
- Wellstone (2012)
- Psalm (2012)
- Hugo and Rufus (2016)

=== Collaboration albums ===
- Brown Bag Season Volume 1 (2011)
- Once Again - Hard Luck Banjoes (Soul Khan & DJ Brace) (2016)
- Grow up - DJ Brace & Soul Khan (2020)

=== Selected guest appearances ===
- Aabaraki - "Karate f/ Soul Khan" "Aabaraki" (2011)
- PremRock & Willie Green - "Had To Be Me (f/ C-Rayz Walz, Soul Khan & DJ Addict) PremRock & Willie Green (2011)
- El Da Sensei... - "Nu World (Part II) (f/ Nutso and Soul Khan)" The Nu World Remix EP (2011)
- Koncept - "Aspirations (f/ Soul Khan)" Awaken (2012)
- Koncept - "The Only Thing (f/ Soul Khan)" Awaken (2012)
- The Audible Doctor - "Stayin Busy Remix (f/ Silent Knight, Kon, Rasheed Chappell, YC the Cynic and Soul Khan) I Think That... (2012)
- YC The Cynic - "More and More (f/ Soul Khan, Van Pea and Sene)" Fall FWD (2012)
- Sene - "We Are Couleurs" (f/ Soul Khan)" Brooklyknight (2012)
- Nitty Scott MC - "Beautiful Struggle" (f/ Soul Khan & Akie Bermiss) "The Boombox Diaries, Vol.1" (2012)
- Danimal Lector - "Look Out Now" (f/ Soul Khan) "Bars Attack" (2013)
- Esoligh - "Being" (f/Koncept, Soul Khan and Cee belle) The Way I See The World (2014)
- Kirswords - "Tri-State Mindstate" (f/ Soul Khan and Joe Swisher) "ABM Records Presents The Vault" (2015)
- Sparx - "Just Begun" (f/ Kirswords, Koncept, Aayu, Soul Khan, Joe Swisher, and Enrichment) "ABM Records Presents The Vault" (2016)
