= Koncept =

American rapper (born 1985)

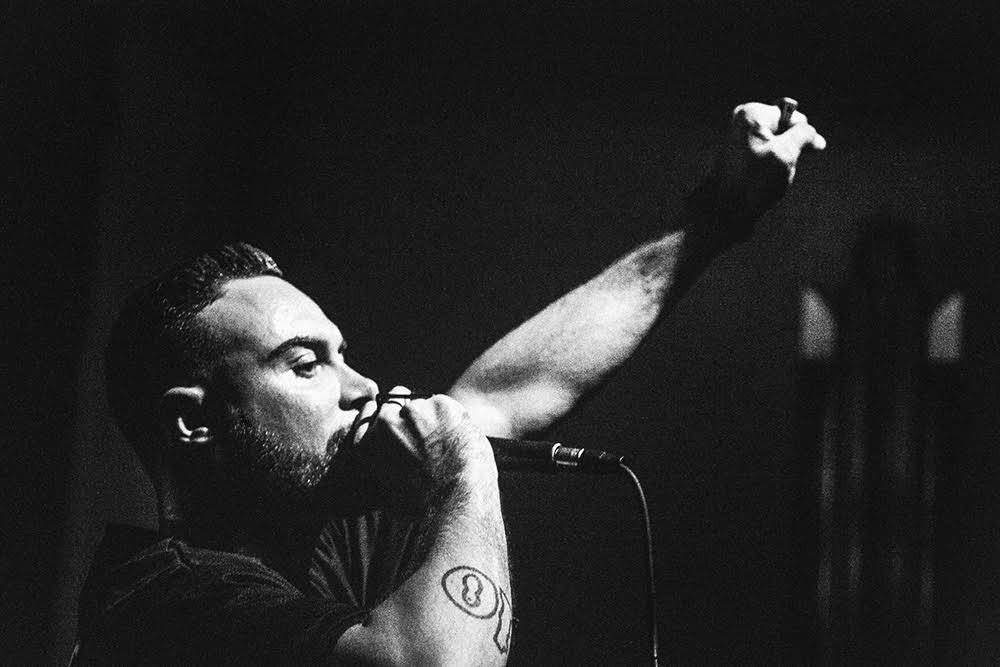
- Koncept in 2016

Background information
- Born: Keith Michael Whitehead; October 10, 1985 (age 41); Queens, New York City, United States
- Origin: Brooklyn, New York City, United States
- Genres: Hip hop; pop
- Occupations: Rapper; singer; songwriter
- Instrument: Vocals
- Years active: 2010–present
- Labels: Sony; Champagne Konny; Vismajor
- Website: iamkoncept.com

Keith Michael Whitehead (born October 10, 1985, in Queens, New York City, United States), popularly known by his stage name Koncept, is an American rapper, singer and songwriter. A former employee at Fat Beats, Koncept started out drawing graffiti and also had a short stint as a DJ before he went on to start writing songs and doing freestyles until he released his first EP in 2010 titled Playing Life. In 2012, he had his first break with his debut solo album titled Awaken which featured guest appearances from Soul Khan, Homeboy Sandman, Royce da 5'9" and Sene with production credits from J57 and Marco Polo. In 2015, he collaborated with J57 to release an EP titled The Fuel which had its fair share of positive review from notable magazines including Respect Magazine, DJ Booth, HipHopDX and The Source.

== Early life ==
Koncept was born and raised in Queens, New York City. He went to high school in Warwick, New York, and attended Community College in Burlington, Vermont, where he used to DJ at nights. Koncept majored in Graphic Design. In 2007, he started working at Fat Beats, a New York City-based hip hop records store where he met producer and music partner J57 as well as the group called Brown Bag AllStars.

== Career ==
Koncept's professional music career started in 2007 while working at Fat Beats. In 2009, he released a 13-track EP titled Resilience and went on to release Playing Life and More Than Meets The Eye EPs in 2010 and 2011 respectively. He made a guest appearance on DJ Concept's Heavy Smoke album released in 2011. On 24 October 2012, Koncept released a single off his 2012 debut album Awaken titled "Watch The Sky Fall" with vocal appearance from Royce da 5'9".

In 2014, he was part of the 2014 annual Brown Bag AllStars A Year in Review mixtape which featured guest appearances from 50 Cent and Phantogram. On 20 November 2015, Koncept released a joint EP with J57 entitled The Fuel with preceding singles like "The Fuel", "Porcelain", "Excitement" and "Crazy is Beautiful" which were received to critical acclaim. The Fuel featured guest appearances from notable artistes including Hollis, Akie Bermiss and Dice Raw. In 2017, he moved to South Korea where he performed at several shows, featured vocals on Part Time Cooks "Calling Me" and then signed a record deal with Sony Music Asia and Vismajor Company, a Korean record label. On 9 June 2017, he released 14 Hours Ahead through his record label Champagne Konny Inc. with support from Sony Music Asia.

== Discography ==
=== Studio albums ===
- Awaken (2012)
- 14 Hours Ahead (2017)
- Champagne Konny (2019)

=== EPs ===
- Resilience (2009)
- Playing Life (2011)
- More Than Meets The Eye (2011)
- Malt Disney (2013)
- Live On (2013)
- Malt Disney (J57 Remix) (2013)
- The Fuel(with J57) (2015)

=== Selected guest appearances ===
Title	Year	Album
"Knuckle Puck"(Soul Khan featuring Koncept, 8thW1 & Homeboy Sandman	2010	Soul Like Khan
"Lost"(Tranzformer featuring Koncept, Blame One, Tenacity & Jefferson Price)	2011	Tranzformer
"Half Zombie"(J57 featuring Silent Knight, Emilio Lopez, Koncept & DJ Emoh Betta)	2012	2057 EP
"Pulp Fiction"(J57 featuring Koncept)	2012	2057 EP
"Puff Puff Pass That"(DJ Concept featuring Koncept, Famoso & Rap P)	2012	Heavy Smoke
"La Luna"(Reks featuring Koncept, Sene, Vanessa Renee)	2012	REBELutionary
"Sound Familiar"(DeeJay Element featuring Koncept & J57)	2013	Reality Kings and Reason
"You Ain't Fresh (Ziplock Mix)"(Playdough featuring Koncept)	2013	Turn It Out
"Losing"(Charmingly Ghetto featuring Chandon & Koncept)	2013	Of The Meaning of Progress
"Louis Vuitton Wallets"(DJ Rhettmatic featuring Koncept)	2014	Non-album single
"Being"(Esoligh featuring Koncept, Soul Khan and Cee belle)	2014	The Way I See The World
"Just Begun"(Sparx f/ Kirswords, Koncept, Aayu, Soul Khan, Joe Swisher & Enrichment)	2016	ABM Records Presents The Vault
