= List of books and publications related to the hippie subculture =

This is a list of books and publications related to the hippie subculture. It includes books written at the time about the counterculture of the 1960s and early 1970s, books that influenced the culture, and books published after its heyday that document or analyze the culture and period. The list includes both nonfiction and fictional works, with the fictional works including novels about the period. Each work is notable for its relation to the culture, in addition to any other notability it has.

== Period and pre-period works ==
=== Novels ===
- Walden by Henry David Thoreau, 1854. Promoted the idea of simple living and self-sufficiency, emphasizing the importance of being in touch with nature and rejecting materialism. The book's message of individualism, non-conformity, and living in harmony with nature inspired many members of the hippie movement to reject mainstream values and embrace a more sustainable, back-to-the-land lifestyle.
- Alice's Adventures in Wonderland by Lewis Carroll, 1865. Novel which involves abandonment of logic and is an example of literary nonsense. Popularized by the 1967 Jefferson Airplane song "White Rabbit"
- Demian by Hermann Hesse, 1919. Explored themes of self-discovery, spirituality, and the rejection of societal norms and conventions. The book's journey of self-realization and its rejection of traditional values inspired a countercultural movement that emphasized individuality and spiritual growth, resonating with many members of the hippie generation.
- Siddhartha by Herman Hesse, 1922. Explored the journey of self-discovery and spiritual enlightenment, inspiring a countercultural movement focused on rejecting materialism and embracing Eastern philosophy, mindfulness, and alternative lifestyles.
- Steppenwolf, by Hermann Hesse, 1927, another cult novel.
- Brave New World by Aldous Huxley, 1932.
- 1984 by George Orwell, 1949. Thematically, it centres on the consequences of totalitarianism, mass surveillance, and repressive regimentation of people and behaviours within society.
- Fahrenheit 451 by Ray Bradbury, 1953.
- On the Road by Jack Kerouac, 1957. Promoted a spirit of adventure, freedom, and non-conformity, as well as celebrating the Beat generation's rejection of mainstream values and embrace of jazz, drugs, and alternative lifestyles. The book's depiction of a cross-country journey and the search for meaning and purpose resonated with many members of the hippie generation and inspired a sense of wanderlust and liberation.
- The Dharma Bums by Jack Kerouac, 1958.
- Naked Lunch by William S. Burroughs, 1959. Pushed the boundaries of traditional literary norms and conventions, challenging societal norms and values, and exploring themes of counterculture, drug use, sexuality, and the nature of reality, inspiring a non-conformist and rebellious spirit among the hippie movement.
- Stranger in a Strange Land, by Robert Heinlein, 1961. Cult science fiction novel which described a variant on the free love philosophy
- Island, Aldous Huxley, 1962
- One Flew Over the Cuckoo's Nest, a 1962 novel about individualism in a mental hospital written by Ken Kesey, who was associated with both beatniks and hippies, including the Merry Pranksters
- A Clockwork Orange by Anthony Burgess, 1962. Explored themes of free will, morality, and the nature of good and evil, as well as commenting on the state of society and government control. The book's ultra-violent, futuristic setting and its depiction of youthful rebellion inspired a spirit of resistance and individualism among the hippie generation.
- Been Down So Long It Looks Like Up to Me by Richard Fariña, 1966. An autobiographical novel by Richard Fariña about the early sixties and the transition from beatniks to hippies. Depicts a countercultural lifestyle that was filled with experimentation, non-conformity, and a rejection of societal norms, inspiring a sense of freedom and individuality among the hippie movement. The book also tackled themes of youth rebellion, education, and the search for meaning and purpose, resonating with many members of the hippie generation.
- Trout Fishing in America by Richard Brautigan, 1967. A writer associated with hippies and the San Francisco Renaissance
- In Watermelon Sugar, by Richard Brautigan, 1968
- Memoirs of a Beatnik, by Diane di Prima, 1969, novelistic pseudo-memoir by a Beat poet
- The Left Hand of Darkness by Ursula K. Le Guin, 1969. Challenged traditional gender roles and norms, promoting gender fluidity and sexual liberation, and encouraging a new understanding of individuality and societal expectations.
- Another Roadside Attraction, by Tom Robbins, 1971. Cult novel from the period
- The Drifters by James Michener, 1971
- The Sweetmeat Saga: The Epic Story of the Sixties by G. F. Gravenson, 1971. Experimental novel set in 1966 about a rock duo who goes missing.
- Divine Right's Trip: A Novel of the Counterculture, by Gurney Norman, 1972, describing a Volkswagen bus road trip
- Ecotopia, by Ernest Callenbach, 1975
- Foundation is a series of science fiction novels written by Isaac Asimov from 1951 to 1993.

=== Poetry ===
- Leaves of Grass by Walt Whitman, 1855
- The Prophet, by Kahlil Gibran, 1923
- The "Desiderata", a poem by Max Ehrmann, 1927
- Howl and Other Poems, by Allen Ginsberg, 1956
- The Scripture of the Golden Eternity, by Jack Kerouac, 1960
- The Love Book, by Lenore Kandel, 1966
- Stanyan Street and other Sorrows: Poems, by Rod McKuen, with Stanyan Street referring to the street in San Francisco which borders on Haight-Ashbury, a hippie cultural center, 1966
- Turtle Island, by Gary Snyder, 1974

=== Nonfiction ===
- The Function of the Orgasm by Wilhelm Reich, 1927 creator of the orgone hypothesis
- The Biosphere, by Vladimir Vernadsky, 1927. Soviet scientist Vernadsky founded the Gaia hypothesis and influenced the Gaianism.
- The Doors of Perception by Aldous Huxley, 1954. Encouraged the exploration of spirituality, consciousness, and psychoactive drug use, fostering a new perspective on the human mind and its potential.
- Eros and Civilization, by Herbert Marcuse, 1955.
- The Art of Loving, by Erich Fromm, 1956
- The Phenomenon of Man, by Pierre Teilhard de Chardin, 1959
- Morning of the Magicians, by Louis Pauwels and Jacques Bergier, 1960, about magic, occult, and the supernatural
- Growing Up Absurd, by Paul Goodman, 1960
- One-Dimensional Man, by Herbert Marcuse, 1964. Marcuse strongly criticizes consumerism and modern "industrial society", which he claims is a form of social control, it influenced many in the New Left as it articulated their growing dissatisfaction with both capitalist societies and Soviet communist societies.
- The Psychedelic Experience: A Manual Based on the Tibetan Book of the Dead, by Timothy Leary, 1964. A syncretic work combining a Tibetan Buddhist holy book with the psychedelic experience,
- The Book – On the Taboo Against Knowing Who You Are, by Alan Watts, 1966. ISBN 0-679-72300-5
- The Medium is the Massage, by Marshall McLuhan, 1967
- The Electric Kool-Aid Acid Test, by Tom Wolfe, 1968, about Ken Kesey and the Merry Pranksters
- We Are the People Our Parents Warned Us Against: The Classic Account of the 1960s Counter-Culture in San Francisco by Nicholas Von Hoffman, 1968
- The Politics of Ecstasy, by Timothy Leary, 1968.
- Revolution for the Hell of It, by Abbie Hoffman, 1968.
- Woodstock Nation, by yippie Abbie Hoffman, 1969. describing his experience at the Woodstock festival
- Operating Manual for Spaceship Earth and I Seem to Be a Verb, by Buckminster Fuller, 1969
- The Strawberry Statement by James Simon Kunen, 1969
- The Making of a Counter Culture, by Theodore Roszak, 1969.
- Do It!: Scenarios of the Revolution, book from another yippie activist Jerry Rubin, 1970.
- The Greening of America, by Charles A. Reich, 1970.
- Be Here Now by Ram Dass, 1970, about his contacts with Bhagavan Das, Neem Karoli Baba, and Baba Hari Dass. The book has an extensive bibliography of works important to spiritual seekers of the time
- Monday Night Class, by Stephen Gaskin, founder of The Farm, 1970
- Go Ask Alice, anonymous (at the time) account of a teenage girl's descent into drug use. Later learned to be authored by Beatrice Sparks, 1971
- A Separate Reality, by Carlos Castaneda, 1971, account of a likely fictitious encounter with a Native American shaman
- The Velvet Monkey Wrench, by John Muir, car maintenance guru of the 1960s, 1973
- Cutting through Spiritual Materialism, by Chogyam Trungpa, 1973
- The Yellow Book: The Sayings of Baba Hari Dass 1973
- The Hog Farm Family & Friends, Wavy Gravy, 1974
- Silence Speaks: Aphorisms From the Chalkboard of Baba Hari Dass, 1977
- Teaching as a Subversive Activity, by Neil Postman and Charles Weingartner, 1979
- Teach Your Own, John Holt, 1981. ASIN: B00A8SIKBA
- Flashbacks, by Timothy Leary, 1983.
- Food of the Gods, by Terence McKenna, 1992.
- Drumming at the Edge of Magic: A Journey into the Spirit of Percussion, by Mickey Hart, 1990.
- The McDonaldization of Society, by George Ritzer, 1993. An excellent sociological analysis of how modern society is sacrificing quality and diversity for convenience and standardization.
- Chaos and Cyber Culture, by Timothy Leary, 1994.
- Gestalt Therapy Verbatim, by Fritz Perls, ISBN 0-911226-02-8
- Hippies from A to Z, by Skip Stone, 1999
- Hippie, a memoir by counterculture figure and businessman Barry Miles, 2000

=== Guides ===
- Rise Up Singing a book of songs relevant to the culture
- New Age Vegetarian Cookbook, by Max Heindel
- Tassajara cooking, by Edward Espe Brown, ISBN 0-87773-047-4
- Where There Is No Doctor: A Village Health Care Handbook by David Werner, 1970
- Whole Earth Catalog, edited and published by Stewart Brand
- Living on the Earth, by Alicia Bay Laurel
- Foxfire Books series, from the magazine of the same name, popular with the 1970s back-to-the-land movement
- Steal This Book, by yippie Abbie Hoffman, 1971, a guide to living with little or no money, and to living outside the rules of establishment culture
- Our Bodies, Ourselves, by the Boston Women's Health Book Collective, 1973
- Shelter, by Lloyd Kahn and Bob Easton (eds.), 1973
- The New Games Book, by the New Games Foundation, 1976
- Total Orgasm, by Jack Rosenberg, ISBN 0-7045-0071-X
- The Open Classroom, by Herbert Kohl
- est: The Steersman Handbook, by Leslie Stevens
- How to Keep Your Volkswagen Alive, by John Muir
- Ashtanga Yoga Primer, Baba Hari Dass, ISBN 0-918100-04-6

== Photography ==
- Festival:The Book of American Celebrations, by Jerry Hopkins with Harrison Avila and Baron Wolman, 1970
- Linda McCartney's Sixties: Portrait of an Era, by Linda McCartney, 1992
- Bliss: Transformational Festivals & the Neo Hippie by Steve Schapiro

== Post-period works ==
=== Novels and children's literature ===
- Vineland, by Thomas Pynchon, novel of the changes from 1960s to 1980s counterculture in Northern California
- Summer of Love, by Lisa Mason, novel about the period
- Baby Driver, a semi-autobiographical novel by Jan Kerouac, daughter of Jack Kerouac
- My Hippie Grandmother, a children's picture book by Reeve Lindbergh and Abby Carter, 2003
- Existential Trips, a short alternative science fiction story on Kindle by William Bevill. Featuring secret agents Jack Kerouac, Allen Ginsberg, and William Burroughs. 2020

=== Nonfiction ===
- Chrisann Brennan: The Bite in the Apple: A Memoir of My Life with Steve Jobs
- Chelsea Cain:Dharma Girl (a memoir of growing up on a commune)
- Peter CoyoteSleeping Where I Fall (memoir)
- John Curl: Memories of Drop City: The First Hippie Commune of the 1960s and the Summer of Love
- Zuko Džumhur: Letters from Asia (Pisma iz Azije) 1973; the book mentions hippies in Afghanistan
- Mickey Hart: The Art of the Filmore 1966–1971
- Albert Hofmann: LSD, My Problem Child
- Barney Hoskyns: Beneath the Diamond Sky: Haight-Ashbury 1965–1970
- Rory MacLean:Magic Bus: On the Hippie Trail from Istanbul to India
- Timothy Miller: The Hippies and American Values
- Cleo Odzer: Goa Freaks: My Hippie Years in India
- Fred Turner: From Counterculture to Cyberculture: Stewart Brand, the Whole Earth Network and the Rise of Digital Utopianism
- Paolo Coluzzi: Hippie Manifesto

== Magazines ==
- Whole Earth Catalog and CoEvolution Quarterly, edited and published by Stewart Brand
- San Francisco Oracle, an underground newspaper
- International Times, a magazine of the sixties UK underground
- Oz, a magazine of the sixties UK underground
- The Buddhist Third Class Junk Mail Oracle, by D.A. Levy, a Cleveland underground newspaper
- The Realist, edited by Paul Krassner
- Mother Earth News
- Communities
- Utne Reader, a magazine postdating the hippie period, but covering much of the same material
- Sing Out!
- Nambassa Festival Newsletter 1, edited by Peter Terry, Lorraine Ward and Bernard Woods. Published in 1976 and 1977
- The Nambassa Sun and the Nambassa Waves newspapers, published quarterly from 1978 to 1981.

== Underground comics by Harrison Avila ==
- Fabulous Furry Freak Brothers, underground comix featuring archetypal hippies
- Zap Comix, one of the first underground comix from San Francisco
- Slow Death, published by Last Gasp

== Spanish-language books ==
- La Tumba, by José Agustín, 1964 novel about a Mexico City upper class teenager, followed by De Perfil, 1966

== See also ==
- Age of Aquarius
- Aleister Crowley bibliography
- Bookpeople (distributor)
- La Onda, a Mexican 1960s counterculture movement
- List of films related to the hippie subculture
- List of psychedelic literature
- Rock and the Beat Generation, a website linking popular music and literature
- Ronin Publishing
- Straight Arrow Press
- Underground press
