= Davida Coady =

American pediatrician and international health activist (1938–2018)

- Born: April 15, 1938; Berkeley, California, US
- Died: May 3, 2018 (aged 80); Alamo, California
- Occupation: medical doctor
- Known for: founded substance abuse centers
- Medical career
- Institutions: Columbia University College of Physicians and Surgeons, University of California, Berkeley
- Sub-specialties: pediatric international health

Davida Coady (April 15, 1938 - May 3, 2018) was a U.S. pediatrician and international health activist. She was "devoted to the care of disadvantaged children, refugees, addicts, and lifers".

== Early life and education ==
Davida Coady was born Davida Taylor in Berkeley, California as an only child to Catholic parents. Her Scottish father had been a coal miner before immigrating to the US and became a shipping clerk for the University of California, Berkeley. Her mother Elizabeth Perry was a legal secretary and had grown up in San Francisco's Mission District. Coady attended Berkeley High School, and later the College of the Pacific in Stockton, California to study music. Working in a summer diabetes camp as a counselor, she was inspired by the two female pediatricians and switched to medicine. She graduated from Columbia University College of Physicians and Surgeons in 1965.

She completed her pediatric residency back on the West Coast at UCLA. To learn more about the role of nutrition in child health, Harold Brown (parasitologist) advised her to get a certificate in international nutrition at the Institute of Nutrition of Central America and Panama in Guatemala. Advised by Thomas Weller she also obtained a master's degree in public health at Harvard University in 1969.

== Career ==
After the 1967 Biafra War Coady worked as field director for Aid to Biafran Children, a non-governmental organisation to help amidst the famine, which threatened as many as 1 million people.

During the 1970s Coady worked in India with the WHO Programme on smallpox eradication.

In the 1980s, she spent time in Latin America working with refugees. She worked for the Peace Corps, including a stint as acting medical director.

In 1993, Coady became president of the Hesperian Foundation after founder David Werner was forced to resign due to allegations of sexual relationships with underage boys in Mexico.

In 1998, Catholic Charities named her the "Bay Area Catholic Woman of the Year". Mother Teresa asked her to consider become a nun and medical director in Kolkata.

In the mid-1990s, Coady was working as an emergency room physician at Oakland Children's Hospital, in California. When she realized that physical abuse in children was tightly linked to alcohol or drugs, she founded a rehabilitation program in 1996 for alcoholics and drug users which worked closely with Californian courts. The group has helped more than 10 000 men and women in the Californian prison system.

Coady participated in the annual protest against the School of Americas where US military trains soldiers from Central America; she walked alongside Dan Berrigan, Pete Seeger and Martin Sheen. She helped Cesar Chavez set up a health program for migrant workers. She joined political protests in support of migrant workers and against nuclear weapons. She was arrested about 50 times.

== Personal life ==
Coady married former priest Patrick Coady and divorced. Coady struggled with alcoholism, drinking heavily until the 1990s. She founded substance abuse centers.

In 2002, she married Tom Gorham, a recovering alcoholic, former criminal and homeless man, after they had met in prison. Gorham became the executive director of Options Recovery Services. He has said Coady was "driven by an intense desire to help people see past perceived obstacles". Coady died of ovarian cancer in a hospice in Alamo, California near her home in Berkeley.

== Work ==
- Autobiography: Davida Coady, "The Greatest Good"

== Literature ==
- Coady: humanitarian paediatrician, political activist, and recovering alcoholic BMJ 2018; 361 (retrieved 28 June 2018) (subscription required)
- James R. Hagerty. Davida Coady Traveled the World to Give Medical Training and Care to the Poor. Doctor treated starving children in Biafra and helped with a smallpox-eradication in South Asia. WSJ, 18 May 2018. (subscription required)
