= Indigo Blue =

2005 novel by Cathy Cassidy

- Author: Cathy Cassidy
- Language: English
- Genre: Children's novel
- Publisher: Puffin Books
- Publication date: 2005
- Publication place: United Kingdom
- Media type: Print
- Pages: 242
- ISBN: 9780141317847
- OCLC: 757737845

Indigo Blue is a 2005 children's novel written by British author Cathy Cassidy. The book is about a girl named Indigo and how her life changes as she, her mother and her baby sister Misti move to a new flat because of domestic violence.

== Plot summary ==
Indigo "Indie" Collins is an 11-year-old girl in Year Six who enjoys daydreaming. The story implies she is living in England. She lives with her mother, her mother's boyfriend Max and her baby sister Misti. Max and Indigo's mother keep arguing and Indigo's Mum becomes a victim of domestic abuse. One morning they move to a new flat in hopes to get away from Max. Indie is also really worried that her best friend Jo does not like her very much anymore, because Indie is not telling her about Max.

When they move to the flat, they don't like it at first. They share the house with Ian, a man above them, and Mrs Green, the owner of the house, a grumpy old lady on the bottom floor. Without much money, Indie's family have to fix up the flat and learn to survive. After a while Indigo's mom agrees to go on a date with Max and he physically injures Indie's mother and is put on trial. Meanwhile, Indigo is looked after by her foster mother followed by her gran who comes from Wales. This story was written by Cathy Cassidy.
