= Dizzy (novel) =

2004 children's novel by Cathy Cassidy

- The original cover
- Author: Cathy Cassidy
- Language: English
- Genre: Children's novel
- Publisher: Puffin
- Publication date: 2004
- Publication place: United Kingdom
- Media type: Print (hardback, e-book and paperback)
- Pages: 272
- ISBN: 978-0-14-193883-7

Dizzy is a 2004 children's novel written by British novelist Cathy Cassidy. It is Cassidy's first published novel. She wrote the book in three months and sent it to three agents. The novel was not based on a true story and Cassidy based the name "Dizzy" on a girl she had met at a wedding. The plot revolves around 12-year-old Dizzy, who goes to live with her estranged mother in a van. Dizzy was published as Dizzy: a novel by Puffin Books and was well-received by critics, who praised Cassidy's writing.

== Premise ==
Dizzy's mother, Storm, left when Dizzy was eight years old, and has been absent from Dizzy's life since, although she has been sending her daughter cards and gifts. Dizzy dreams that her mother will come home to live with her and her father one day. Storm ends up coming home on Dizzy's 12th birthday, and Dizzy goes to live with her in a van during the summer despite her father not being okay with this. Storm brings Dizzy to the Solstice festival in Scotland. Dizzy begins to realise that her mother is not the dream figure she had pictured, and is surprised that she has a boyfriend, Zak who himself has a child, seven-year-old Mouse.

Dizzy gets close to Mouse. She also becomes friends with a 14-year-old boy, Finn, with whom she used to play when they were small children. Dizzy develops an attraction to Finn and kisses him on his birthday at the beach. Whilst trying to do a stunt on Finn's BMX bike, Mouse falls into a bonfire is injured; he is saved by Finn. Mouse is taken into care and Dizzy's father comes to take her back home after Finn's mother, Tess, gets in touch with him.

== Publication ==
Dizzy was originally released in 2004 as Dizzy: a novel. It is Cathy Cassidy's first published novel. She had initially begun a historical novel, but never finished it. She wrote Dizzy in three months, and then put it in a drawer upon completion; she later said that she was too nervous to send it to anyone, as "My dreams of being published would have been shattered if it was rejected". Cassidy's friend eventually persuaded her to send the manuscript to three different agents, however, and one replied within two days. Dizzy was then published by Puffin Books, which Cassidy called a "dream come true".

The novel was not based on a true story; Cassidy explained in 2007, "I had lots of traveller friends and have always wanted to set a story in that world. The name came from a girl I met at a traveller wedding, Dizzy was a nickname for Denise, but it stuck in my mind and I knew I'd use it in a story one day!" After Dizzy was published, Cassidy became one of the UK's most popular children's book authors. An e-book version of the novel was released in 2008. A new edition of the novel with a new cover was released on 2 June 2011. The book is currently available in paperback.

== Reception ==
Dinah Hall from The Daily Telegraph put Dizzy on her list of the best new children's books and opined that Dizzy's "prodigal mother" tricked her daughter into coming with her for the summer. Hall wrote that it was predictable that Cassidy was compared to established children's author Jacqueline Wilson, adding that both authors have the same "fluid readability" for readers over the age of nine, and that both featured "characters on the fringes of society". However, Hall added, "where Wilson's [characters] have begun to feel stereotypical, Cassidy's have real heart, and subtly encourage the readers to abandon preconceptions". Julia Eccleshare from LoveReading4Kids believed that Dizzy was smart, and that "Dizzy's growing awareness of herself and her surroundings is warmly explored, and Cathy Cassidy gives a balanced picture of a different way of life, while never losing sight of the fact that whoever and wherever children are, they need consistent love and attention." Eccleshare also placed the novel on her list of the best stories for "sunny days".

The Guardian placed Dizzy, along with Cassidy's later novel Sundae Girl, on its list of "Books that could help teachers raise sensitive issues". It opined that the central characters in both novels are "emotionally abused by their inadequate mothers" and noted that Dizzy becomes unhappy due to her mother's unreliability and the "instability" of her life with her. The paper also noted how Cassidy's novels are "light-hearted and hopeful" whilst dealing with issues relating to families, relationships and friendships, as well as conveying a "strong sense" of how children between the ages of 10 and 13 speak and behave. A reviewer from Publishers Weekly wrote, "Overall, readers will appreciate this unique world that Dizzy has discovered, even as they hope she finds her way back". The review opined that it was easy to empathise with Dizzy's "complicated emotions" and that readers were given a "clear picture of Dizzy's life on the road", but the writer also believed that some of the novel's narration seemed too mature for Dizzy's age.
