= Aschwanden =

Aschwanden is a surname. Notable people with the surname include:

- Christie Aschwanden, American journalist and author
- Peter Aschwanden (1942–2005), American artist and illustrator
- Sergei Aschwanden (born 1975), Swiss judoka
- Wilhelm Aschwanden (born 1969), Swiss cross-country skier
