= Looking Glass Girl =

2015 children's novel by Cathy Cassidy

- Author: Cathy Cassidy
- Language: English
- Genre: Children's novel
- Publisher: Puffin
- Publication date: 2 April 2015
- Publication place: United Kingdom
- Media type: Print (hardback, Ebook & paperback) and audiobook
- Pages: 272
- ISBN: 978-0141357836

Looking Glass Girl is a 2015 children's novel written by English novelist Cathy Cassidy. It is inspired by Lewis Carroll's Alice's Adventures in Wonderland and was written for its 150th-year anniversary. Cassidy considered the novel to be one of her darker books and she explained that she had been inspired by Carroll's work and how the character of Alice did not know what was going on, which she compared to her teenage years. The plot of Looking Glass Girl centres around 13-year-old Alice, who is in a coma after she is involved in an accident at a sleepover. Whilst in the coma, she dreams that she is in Wonderland. The plot switches from the events leading up to the accident, Alice's dreams in Wonderland and the reactions of the people around Alice whilst she is in a coma. The novel received generally positive reviews.

== Premise ==
Eleven-year-old Alice is surprised when her popular schoolmate Savvy invites her to her Alice in Wonderland-themed sleepover with other girls and initially contemplates not going. At the sleepover, Alice ends up getting in an accident and hitting her head on a mirror. Alice is rushed to hospital and remains in a coma, with the people around her – including her family, the girls at the sleepover and Luke, Alice's friend who she kissed – dealing with what happened. In the coma, Alice dreams that she is in Wonderland, and the rest of the plot deals with the events leading up to Alice's accident.

== Background and release ==
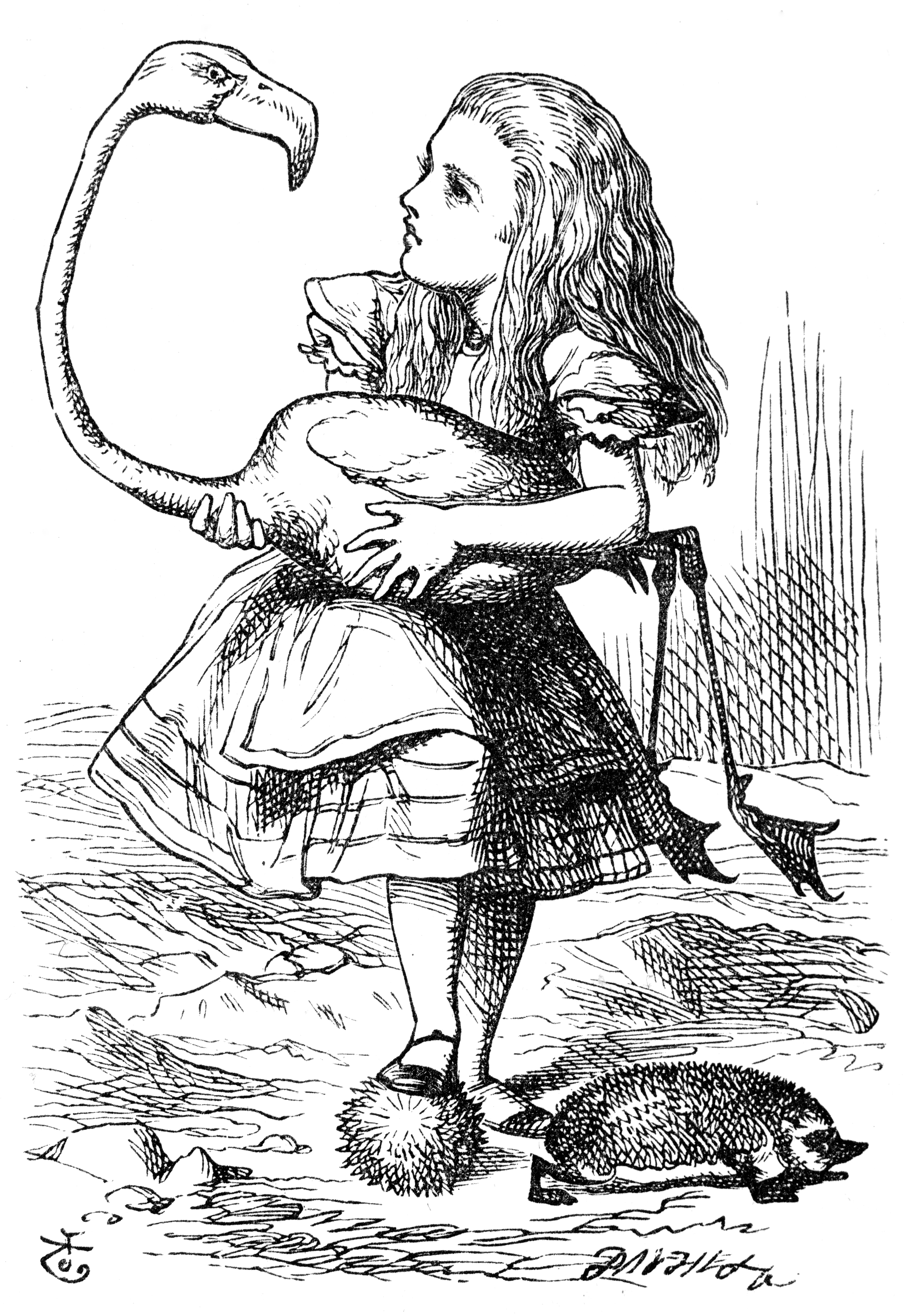
Cassidy loved the character of Alice from the original 1865 novel

Looking Glass Girl is a "celebration" of and inspired by Lewis Carroll's Alice's Adventures in Wonderland. Looking Glass Girl author Cathy Cassidy first read the novel as a library book as an eight or nine-year-old child and she later tried to find the exact edition as an adult, which she was unable to do, though she believed that she had some "beautiful versions" of it. Cassidy said that she was always "loved" the novel and its sequel Through the Looking-Glass. When Cassidy would ask children about their favourite fairy tales, they would always mention Alice, and Cassidy believed that the imagery was very strong in the book. Cassidy loved the main character of Alice and considered her a bit of a "style icon" and believed that it was where a lot of her looks subconsciously came from; Cassidy explained, "I was hooked on Alice's style from the very start...I wanted to be Alice, in that cool sticky-out dress and hooped tights, the little-girl shoes and the wavy hair".

As a child, Cassidy considered Alice to be "curious, brave and a little lost", and she liked that Alice did not have all the answers. When Cassidy re-read the book as an adult, she considered it to be a "darker story, a surreal, nightmarish adventure that disturbed and unsettled", which intrigued her. The author also liked how the tale would change dangerously between being a nightmare and dream. Cassidy compared Alice's struggle of not know what is going on to her teenage years, where she struggled to fit in with her peers, admitting, "Adolescence was not so much a Wonderland as a nightmare for me". Cassidy believed that the tale was also one of the first Victorian stories to be written "with the child's enjoyment in mind, rather than with the idea of preaching morality or manners". Cassidy also thought that Carroll's original story was part of modern culture due to all of the adaptations of the story.

Looking Glass Girl was published to celebrate the 150th anniversary of Alice's Adventures in Wonderland. Cassidy explained that her editor gave her the challenge to write something linked to Alice's Adventures in Wonderland as they knew it was one of her favourite books and so Cassidy decided that the 150th year was a good time to release it. Cassidy considered Looking Glass Girl to be darker than some of the other books that she written, but she enjoyed writing it and linking it back to the character of Alice. She explained that she was looking at how far a bully would go to hurt someone and why. In the plot, 11-year-old Alice finds herself in Carroll's world. The plot switches from Alice being in Wonderland, the events lead up to her accident and the reactions of lives of those around her whilst she is in hospital, and it is also told in flashbacks from different points of views. The book deals with the themes of friendship, love and bullying. Cassidy did not consider Looking Glass Girl to be a re-imagining or adaptation of Carroll's tale, but instead an "original" modern story about girls who go to an Alice-themed sleepover which goes extremely wrong. She also knew immediately that her story would be slightly surreal. Cassidy added, "I still felt very much that I was writing my own story, just referencing the imagery from Alice [...] It's edge-of-your-seat stuff – it was a lot of fun to write!"

The novel was released on 2 April 2015. Cassidy launched the book at Coventry Central Library, which she chose in order to highlight the threat of 17 libraries in Coventry closing due to cuts from Coventry City Council. Cassidy believed in the importance of libraries, calling them "entitlements" rather than "luxuries". Sorrelle Clements, the learning development manager of Coventry Libraries, compared Cassidy's visit to a "premier league footballer" visiting and believed that she was inspirational to show young people what a "Coventry girl" can achieve. Cassidy later read extracts of the book at the "Book Nook", a reading centre that she opened at West Kirby Grammar School. A paperback version of Looking Glass Girl was released on 4 February 2016.

== Reception ==
A reader writing for The Guardian rated the book "four and a half out of five" and said that they would read it again, believing that Cassidy did an "amazing job weaving in literal and metaphorical links" between her story and Carroll's. They added that they were "hooked" from the first page, but would have preferred more detail of what was happening in Wonderland. Another reader from the same website rated the book 5 stars and called it their favourites of Cassidy's works, and believed that the story had "advice woven between the words like thread" and that readers could learn things from it. They added that the book "makes you move to the edge of your seat" and showed the importance of friendship. Julia Eccleshare from The Guardian put the novel on her list of the best retellings and sequels of classic children's books and noted that the story highlighted friendship and the "insidious nature of bullying". She also opined that the "realistic" story had "drawn on some of the ideas" of Carroll's original book. The book had an average rating of 5 out 5 stars on the Summer Reading Challenge website. Books for Keeps rated the book 3 out of 5 stars, with a writer from the website calling the book a "tale of jealousy, loneliness and spite" and a "soap opera of a read". They called the dialogue "banal and repetitious" and believed that it made the reading tedious, and criticised other elements of the plot. The writer also questioned why Alice would want to be friends with Savvy and opined that Alice was worth more than that and believed that there was a "believable sexual element" between Alice and Luke. Sophie de Rosée from The Daily Telegraph wrote that Cassidy provided a "fresh perspective" of Carroll's original story.
