= Sundae Girl =

2007 children's novel by Cathy Cassidy

- The original cover
- Author: Cathy Cassidy
- Language: English
- Genre: Children's novel
- Publisher: Puffin
- Publication date: 5 April 2007
- Publication place: United Kingdom
- Media type: Print (hardback, Ebook and paperback)
- Pages: 256
- ISBN: 978-0141338934

Sundae Girl is a 2007 children's novel written by English novelist Cathy Cassidy. It was released on 5 April 2007, published by Penguin Books. The plot revolves around Jude's struggle with her family life and how things change when she meets a boy in her school. The novel features the issues of alcoholism and dementia. Sundae Girl was well-received by readers and critics, who praised Cassidy's handling of alcoholism and dementia. The novel was a Sunday Independent bestseller and was also nominated for the 2008 Worcestershire Teen Book Award.

== Premise ==
13-year-old Jude loves her eccentric family but finds them stressful. Her father is an Elvis impersonator whilst her mother causes trouble and is an alcoholic, often breaking promises to Jude. Jude's parents are divorced and her father has a new partner, whilst Jude's mother, Rose, has a boyfriend named Giovanni who works in an ice cream van. Jude's grandmother also has dementia. The situation in Jude's family life become worse, but things change when Jude meets a boy in her school named Kevin Carter. Kevin tries to get close to Jude but she initially is hesitant as she does not feel comfortable revealing her family life. Jude's grandmother dies at the end of the novel and Jude's mother eventually stops drinking.

== Publication ==
Sundae Girl was written by English novelist Cathy Cassidy and originally released on 5 April 2007, published by Penguin Books. The novel features the issues of alcoholism and dementia. The end of the book includes recipes and character quizzes. A new edition of the novel was released on 2 June 2011.

== Reception ==
Sundae Girl was included Richard Madeley and Judy Finnigan's one-off special Richard & Judy's Best Kids Books Ever in the "Confident (9+)" category, which was part of their book club that aimed to get more children reading. It was also one of six novels to be nominated for the 2008 Worcestershire Teen Book Award. Sundae Girl reached third place in the Children's books Bestsellers section compiled by the Sunday Independent in April 2007.

A writer from BookTrust wrote, "Tackling gritty issues such as alcoholism and dementia can be a tricky business but Cathy Cassidy carries it off with confidence retaining humour and sensitivity in a readable and worthwhile story". Sarah Webb from the Irish Independent called Jude's family "rather eccentric" and believed that older fans of Jacqueline Wilson would like Cassidy's novels. Webb also called Sundae Girl a "gritty yet funny tale of friendship and young love". Two child reviewers from The Guardian really enjoyed the novel and gave it good reviews. A writer from the Evening Herald opined that Sundae Girl and Cassidy's previous novels achieved "massive success".

Joel Rickett from The Bookseller called the novel "sparkly". A writer from The Guardian placed Sundae Girl, along with Cassidy's debut novel Dizzy, on their list of "Books that could help teachers raise sensitive issues". They opined that the central characters in both novels are "emotionally abused by their inadequate mothers" and noted that Jude's home life was "dominated" by her grandmother's Alzheimer's disease and her mother's drinking, as well as how Jude was "weighed down" with responsibilities and was romantically pursued by a "charmingly eccentric" classmate. The writer observed how Cassidy's novels are "light-hearted and hopeful" whilst dealing with issues relating to families, relationships and friendships, as well as conveying a "strong sense" of how children between the ages of 10 and 13 speak and behave. They also called the ending's resolution "satisfactory" and called Jude's grandad "devoted".
