= Bookpeople (distributor) =

Defunct American bookseller

- Type: Distributor
- Industry: bookselling
- Founder: Don Gerrard
- Defunct: 2004
- Fate: Bankruptcy
- Headquarters: 7900 Edgewater Drive, Berkeley, Oakland, United States
- Area served: worldwide
- Key people: Gene Taback, President
- Owner: Bookpeople Employees Association

Bookpeople was an employee-owned and operated book wholesaler and distributor based in the San Francisco Bay Area. It operated from 1969-2003. Bookpeople was one of the major forces behind the renaissance of independent publishing that occurred during this period. The business provided a wide range of hard-to-find titles to bookstores throughout the U.S. and the world. It also played a major role in the development of New Age and radical political publishing and bookselling. It was not related to The Book People, a U.K. publishing concern, or BookPeople, an Austin, Texas bookstore.

== History ==
Don Gerrard started the business in 1969, which afterward was purchased by the employees, who re-formed it into a type of cooperative business. They incorporated in 1971 as the Bookpeople Employee's Association. It was one of the earliest cooperatives in the Bay Area. The business started in Berkeley, moving to nearby Oakland in the early 1990s. While being noted for carrying a wide range of controversial books, Bookpeople was also noted for refusing to carry books that were seen by some in the bookselling community as inappropriately sexist or exploitive, such as American Psycho.

== Publishing ==
While often being credited as a publisher, strictly speaking they did not publish under the Bookpeople imprint. They did operate a publishing house, Wingbow Press, which published books of local interest, such as early editions of Bargain Hunting in the Bay Area, by Sally Socolich, and books on women's spirituality, divination and ecology.

== Exclusive distribution ==
Bookpeople was able to offer exclusive distribution to many small publishers that were then able to achieve wider distribution to bookstores. By offering bookstores return privileges, the stores were able to try titles from smaller publishers without having to absorb the full cost for unsold titles. Many of these publishers and books would eventually be sold to or become major imprints of larger publishers, or larger publishers in their own right. Some of these titles included Mutant Message Down Under (a self-published title picked up by HarperCollins after amassing significant sales), The Lazy Man's Guide to Enlightenment (picked up for publication by Bantam Books after 9 years with a small press), and the Whole Earth Catalog; publishers included John Muir Press, and North Atlantic Books.

== Wholesaling ==
The largest section of their business was wholesaling, where they provided nonexclusive sales of books from major trade publishers as well as small presses. Their wholesale catalog was used by booksellers for years as a resource for surveying the state of alternative publishing, as they consistently carried new titles in such burgeoning fields as African American studies, feminism, holistic health, spirituality, gay and lesbian literature (including erotica), in addition to the aforementioned categories.

== Legacy ==
The bookselling world was affected by the loss of Bookpeople, having cultivated relationships with them for over 30 years, and having had staff move into other positions within the bookselling community.

== See also ==
- List of book distributors
