= Cherry Crush (disambiguation) =

Cherry Crush is a 2007 film.

Cherry Crush may also refer to:

- Cherry Crush (novel)
- Cherry Crush, a soft drink flavor
- "Cherry Crush", a song on the eponymous album Nobody's Angel
- "Cherry Crush", a song by Chopper One on Now Playing

== See also ==
- Cherry Rush, an EP by Cherry Bullet
