= Ginger Snap (disambiguation) =

A ginger snap is a hard gingerbread cookie.

Ginger snap or Ginger Snaps may also refer to:

- Zu Zu Ginger Snaps, a discontinued brand of cookies
- Ginger Snap, a character from Strawberry Shortcake
- GingerSnaps (novel), a 2008 novel by Cathy Cassidy
- Ginger Snaps, Canadian horror film series consisting of:
  - Ginger Snaps (film), 2000
  - Ginger Snaps 2: Unleashed, a 2004 sequel
  - Ginger Snaps Back: The Beginning, a 2004 prequel
- Ginger Snaps (TV series), a 2017 American adult animated sitcom web series
- "Ginger Snaps", a 1989 episode of Dynasty
