= Angel Cake (novel) =

2009 children's novel by Cathy Cassidy

- The original cover
- Author: Cathy Cassidy
- Illustrator: Sara Flavell
- Language: English
- Genre: Children's novel
- Publisher: Puffin
- Publication date: 4 July 2009
- Publication place: United Kingdom
- Media type: Print (hardback, E-book and paperback)
- Pages: 224
- ISBN: 978-0141338903

Angel Cake is a 2009 children's novel written by English novelist Cathy Cassidy and illustrated by Sara Flavell. It was released on 4 July 2009, which was also the first National Best Friends Day. The novel revolves around a girl who moves from Poland to the United Kingdom. Cassidy got the inspiration for the novel from the experience of a young girl's first days of living in the United Kingdom. The novel was well-received by readers and critics and was nominated for the 2010 Worcestershire Teen Book Award and the 2011 Grampian Children's Book Awards.

== Plot ==
Anya and her family move from Kraków, Poland, to the United Kingdom to start a new life and join Anya's father, who had lived there before. They move to a flat above a fish-and-chip shop in Liverpool. Anya used to dream of living in the UK, but she is disappointed by what she experiences because of the weather, problems at school, struggling with the language and other problems which lead to Anya becoming homesick. However, things change when she meets bad boy Dan, whom she likes to be around and sees a softer side to. However, just as Anya begins to settle in, money issues arise due to her father's business not doing well and there is a risk that Anya and her family will have to go back to Poland. Anya also becomes friends with Frankie and Kurt, and although she initially does not like them much, she realises that they are actually great friends that support her hardships.

== Publication ==
Angel Cake was written by Cathy Cassidy and illustrated by Sara Flavell. Cassidy was inspired to write Angel Cake a few years prior to its release from a girl she met at Notre Dame Catholic College, Liverpool, a school that Cassidy gave a reading at. The writer explained, "The girl handed me a piece of writing about her first day in the UK and her feelings just sizzled off the page. I didn't intend to do anything about it, but the idea of what it would be like to come to a different country niggled away at me." Cassidy could not get the girl's "incredibly powerful piece" about her first days in Britain out of her head, which led to the story growing. The author knew a bit about Polish culture due to some of her best friends in school being Polish, and she also had a network of four Polish girls on her website that helped her "understand their experiences".

The novel was announced in 2008 and was published on 4 July 2009, which was also reported to be the first annual National Best Friends Day by Janet Tansley from Liverpool Echo; friendship is a common theme across Cassidy's novels and was central to Angel Cake. The launch tied with Cassidy's "Friendship Charter", a project she launched with Childline that asked young people to pledge six steps to make a difference to people's lives. A Waterstones bookshop in Worcester celebrated the novel's release and performed random acts of kindness. Cassidy also signed copies of the novel at the Waterstones shop in Liverpool One shortly after the novel was released. Despite being released in the UK on 4 July, it was available in Australia and New Zealand in June 2009. Angel Cake was published by Penguin Books, and a new edition of the novel was released on 2 June 2011. The end of the book features a recipe to make angel cake.

== Reception ==
Angel Cake was one of six novels to be nominated for the 2010 Worcestershire Teen Book Award. It was also shortlisted for the 2011 Grampian Children's Book Awards.

Ahead of the novel's release, a writer from the Irish Independent believed that the plot sounded "fabulous". A reviewer from The Guardian in 2011 rated the book four and a half out of five stars and recommended it for readers of Cassidy and Jacqueline Wilson. The following year, a reader from the same website wrote that she could not stop reading the book as it was "too good" and opined that the novel "makes you feel like one of the characters" and has a message. Kevin McGuire from the Galway Advertiser called Anya's love interest a "local bad boy". A writer from Worcester News believed that the "message at the heart of" Angel Cake was the "power and importance of friendship". Sarah Webb from the Irish Independent wrote that the novel was written with a "light touch" and was "packed with characters that leap off the page".

Jill Murphy from The Bookbag praised Cassidy's writing, explaining, "Here, she's talking about the social issue of immigration and the teen issue of fitting in. She melds them together perfectly and subtly gives readers pause for thought about a hot topical issue, but it's by osmosis almost, because we're fixed on Anya herself. And we really do want her to have a happy ending." Murphy also called the prose "relaxed and confident", adding, "It's easy to read but not simplistic and the teen thought processes are immediately recognisable to the reader. Cassidy has a real ear for dialogue and it shows." Murphy also praised the addition of the angel cake recipe at the end of the book and rated the novel four out of five stars. She also called the book vivid and believed that it was not surprising that Anya was homesick; she added that the novel has "great energy but also a good deal of clear-eyed kindness and common sense about it", and that the novel showcased why Cassidy is a popular writer.

Naida Mulligan from Stuff wrote that she had difficulty putting the book down and believed that it made readers "both laugh and cry", and she also praised the novel's descriptions of Liverpool, which she called a "great jaunt down memory lane". However, Mulligan also criticised the "boyfriend/girlfriend relationship" between the characters due to their young ages and believed that the "kissing at the very least could have been avoided". She added, "This novel is great reading with ideas that youngsters can learn from but I would not be keen on giving it to Year 7 or 8 children to read owing to some of the more mature content." Mulligan also called the novel "eagerly awaited". Anne Faundez from Books for Keeps praised Cassidy's ability to make the young characters "convincingly alive" by expressing their feelings and concerns, though she believed that a third-person perspective would have helped to portray an immigrant's experience in their first few months. Faundez found the book positive and "breezy", adding that the "colloquial language and intimate first-person narrative will appeal to a wide readership". She also wrote, "Teenage concerns of friendships, first love and belonging are set within larger themes of migration, prejudice and integration. Anya's sense of being different runs parallel with Dan's emotional distancing from school and his dad, and both need to find ways of coming to terms with their life".
