= Foothill College =

Community college in Los Altos Hills, California, US

- Motto: Upgrade. Advance.
- Type: Public community college
- Established: January 15, 1957
- Parent institution: Foothill–De Anza Community College District
- Academic affiliations: De Anza College
- President: Kristina Whalen
- Faculty: 347
- Administrative staff: 547
- Students: 13,630
- Location: Los Altos Hills, California, U.S. 37°21′41″N 122°07′44″W
- Campus: Suburban, 122 acres (49 ha)
- Colors: Scarlet, black & white
- Nickname: Owls
- Mascot: Footsie the Owl
- Website: www.foothill.edu

Foothill College is a public community college in Los Altos Hills, California. It is part of the Foothill–De Anza Community College District. It was founded on January 15, 1957, and offers 84 associate degree programs, two bachelor's degree programs, and 124 certificate programs. The college operates on a quarter system, one of just three on that system among California community colleges.

== History ==
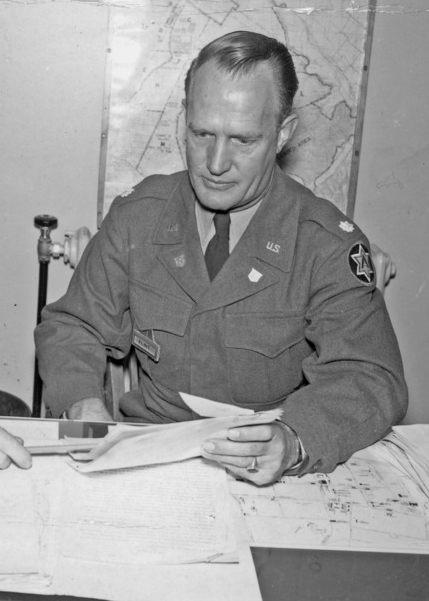
Calvin Flint was the first President/Superintendent of Foothill College.

In July 1956, Palo Alto Unified School District Superintendent Henry M. Gunn called a meeting of local school superintendents that led to the creation of Foothill College. Calvin Flint, then President of Monterey Peninsula College, was hired as the first District Superintendent and President; he started work on March 1, 1958.

Candidates for the new college's name, besides Foothill, were Peninsula, Junipero Serra, Mid-Peninsula, Earl Warren, Herbert Hoover, North Santa Clara, Altos, Valley, Skyline, Highland, and Intercity. At first the name was Foothill Junior College, but because Flint insisted that his new college would be "not junior to anyone", the Board dropped the "Junior" in September 1958.

Foothill held its first classes in the old Highway School campus on El Camino Real in Mountain View on September 15, 1958. It was accredited by March of the next year and was the first school in the state to ever reach full accreditation in less than six months. The owl mascot originated from a concrete owl that was a decoration on the Highway School's bell tower; it was later moved to the new campus.

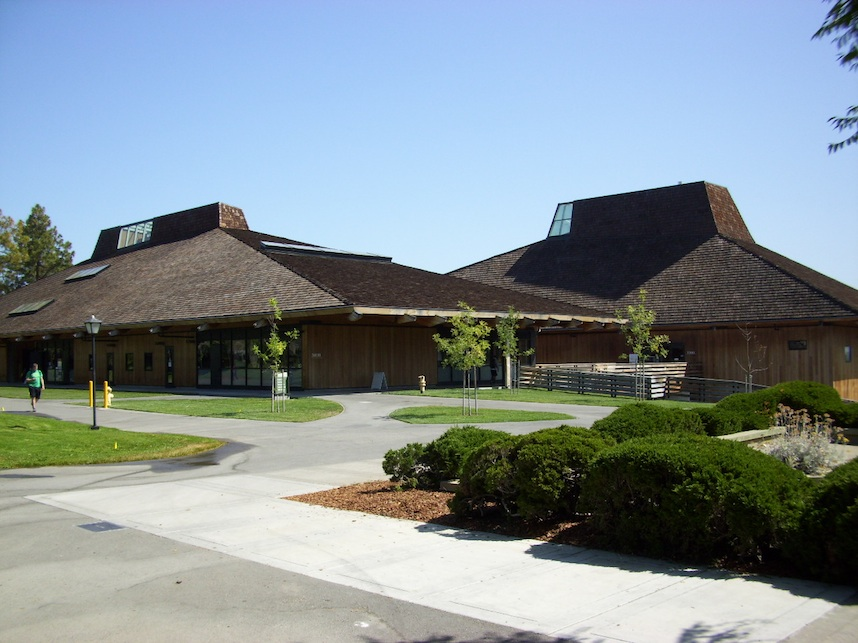
Example of Foothill's campus architecture

The campus was designed by architect Ernest Kump and landscape architects Hideo Sasaki and Peter Walker, to resemble a neo-Japanese garden. The Foothill College was intended as a junior college for 3,500 full-time students, within the 122-acre campus, the first of many junior colleges built after World War II in California. Soon after its completion, Foothill was widely recognized as a pioneer, setting high standards for new campus design.

Traditionally, Foothill serves the communities of Los Altos Hills, Los Altos, Mountain View, and Palo Alto; together these communities form the northwest corner of Silicon Valley. The college sits next to Interstate 280, at the interchange with El Monte Road.

In 1965 the college opened a new lecture hall that had a wired student response system that featured buttons at each seat. The students were given in-lecture multiple-choice questions, and their responses were electronically tabulated for their professors. This pre-dated modern student response systems by decades.

In 1993, Foothill and its sister school De Anza College became the first California Community Colleges to offer Domestic Partner benefits. The colleges were among a very small number of institutions of higher education to do so, with Pitzer College and the University of Iowa in 1991 and Stanford and the University of Chicago in 1992.

On December 10, 2001, Foothill College abruptly canceled its men's basketball season after completing just six games. Questions arose over how housing and tuition for six international players were being paid by Tariq Abdul-Wahad, then with the NBA's Denver Nuggets and alumnus of San Jose State University.

In 2002, a second campus was opened on the site of the former Cubberley High School in Palo Alto, in facilities leased from the Palo Alto School District. In September 2016, this was replaced by the Sunnyvale Center, which the college built on part of the site of the now closed Onizuka Air Force Station, preserving artefacts from the "Blue Cube" and embedding shards of its skin in walkways. The new center can accommodate more than 1,600 students.

The campus serves a very large number of international students who are attempting to acquire associate degrees as the basis for transferring into prestigious American universities; according to a Community College Week survey in 2001, Foothill had the 12th highest population of international students out of all community colleges in the United States. The school was harshly criticized in 2002 by The Wall Street Journal for its aggressive recruitment of such students, since they are a lucrative revenue source who pay a much higher tuition.

In 2003, to accommodate nearly 14,000 students on a campus designed for 3,500, the college began renovating almost the entire campus, including demolition and replacement of unsafe buildings. Two of the new buildings in the lower campus complex have green roofs topped with grass.

=== Foothill Electronics Museum ===
Between 1973 and 1991, an electronics museum stood on the Foothill College campus. The museum was established with the help of the Douglas Perham Electronic Foundation, which wanted a permanent home for its extensive electronics collection, including papers of the inventor of the vacuum tube amplifier, Lee de Forest. The foundation raised money to construct a museum building on the Foothill campus and donated its collection to the college. The museum opened in 1973, and was initially operated by employees of Foothill College for six years until 1979, just after the passage of Proposition 13 rolled back property taxes and reduced funds to run the college. In response to the funding shortage, volunteers began staffing the museum.

However, in 1988, the college board of trustees decided to close the museum, sell or donate the assets, and use the space for classrooms. A newly appointed Perham board member, Bart Lee, took on the case and sued Foothill, claiming the college violated an agreement with the Perham Foundation. The foundation was eventually awarded $775,000, which they used to document, pack up, and place the collection in storage before a 1991 deadline. The collection stayed in storage for twelve years, before being acquired in 2003 by History San José and put on display as The Perham Collection of Early Electronics.

=== Presidents ===
- Calvin C. Flint (1957–1973)
- Hubert H. Semans (1967–1973)
- James S. Fitzgerald (1973–1982)
- Thomas H. Clements (1982–1994)
- Bernadine Chuck Fong (1994–2006)
- Penny Patz (interim) (2006–2007)
- Judy Miner (2007–2015)
- Kimberlee Messina (interim) (2015–2016)
- Thuy Thi Nguyen (2016–2021)
- Bernadine Chuck Fong (interim) (2021–2023)
- Kristina Whalen (2023–present)

== Accreditation ==
Foothill College is accredited by the Accrediting Commission for Community and Junior Colleges. Specific programs at the college are also accredited by the American Veterinary Medical Association, American Dental Association Commission on Dental Accreditation, American Medical Association Council on Medical Education, and Commission on Accreditation of Allied Health Education Programs.

== Organization ==
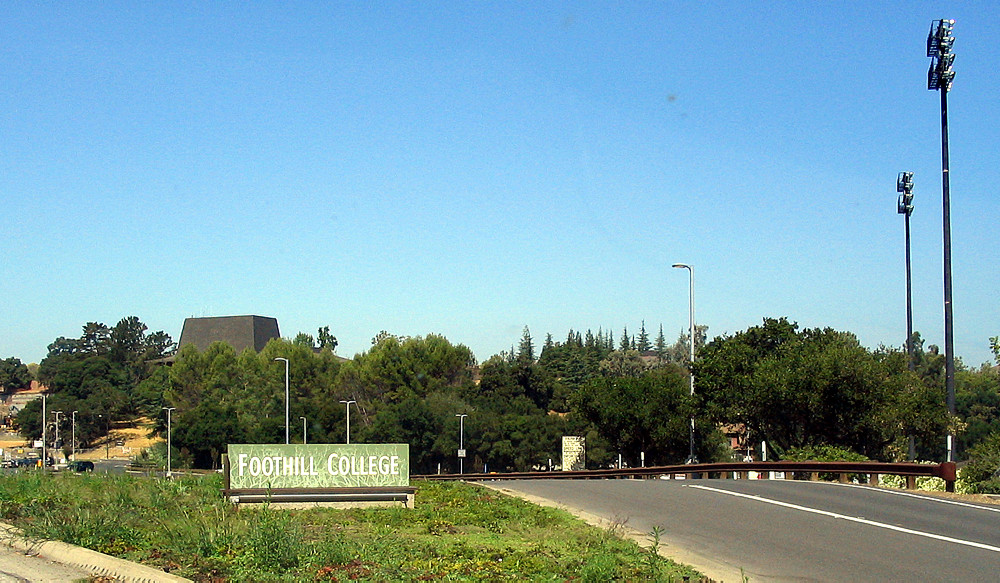
Foothill College entrance

The community college district's headquarters are located in one corner of the Foothill campus. The district also administers De Anza College in nearby Cupertino.

The college has several divisions:

- Business & Social Sciences
- Counseling & Student Services
- Fine Arts & Communication
- Health Sciences & Horticulture
- Instructional Services & Libraries
- Language Arts & Ethnic Studies
- Kinesiology & Athletics
- Science, Technology, Engineering, & Mathematics

== Transfer Pathways ==
Foothill College is among California's leading community colleges for university transfers, sending students to University of California and California State University campuses each year. Academic planning resources support students in navigating the course requirements associated with these transfer pathways. These include Cherrypicker, a sophisticated student-developed transfer planning platform for California community colleges, also currently operating for De Anza College students.

== Athletics ==
Foothill is a member of the Coast Conference of the California Community College Commission on Athletics and NorCal Football Conference. The school mascot is an owl. The Los Altos Hills campus has a track and field that is open to the public.

=== Intercollegiate teams ===
- Football
- Men's and women's basketball
- Men's and women's soccer
- Men's and women's swimming
- Men's and women's tennis

== Student government ==
Foothill's student government is the Associated Students of Foothill College (ASFC). Student government provides its student body the opportunity to self-govern and participate with faculty, staff, and administration.

== Accomplishments ==
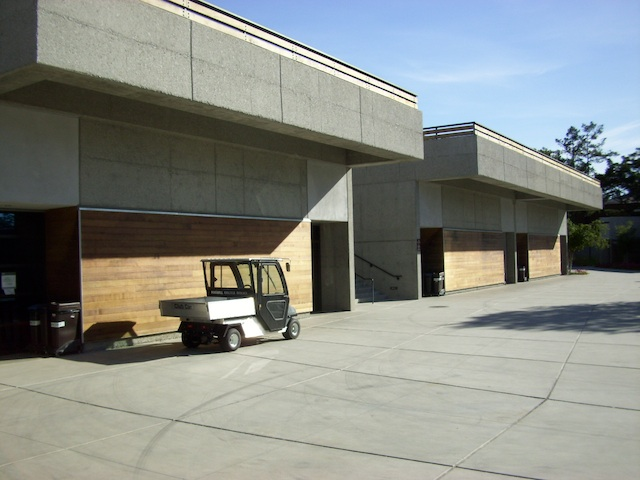
Outside classroom 8401 at Foothill College

Five Foothill professors have won the Hayward Award of the Academic Senate of the California Community Colleges, given each year to a faculty member who has a "track record of excellence in both teaching and professional activities". Foothill's winners include Jay Manley, Mike McHargue, Elizabeth Barkley, Andrew Fraknoi, and Scott Lankford. In addition, Frank Cascarano and David Marasco are Fellows of the American Association of Physics Teachers.

Foothill College's Physics Show, started in 2007 by physics professors Frank Cascarano and David Marasco on the model of The Wonders of Physics at the University of Wisconsin, Madison, is one of the largest popular physics presentations in the US, with an annual audience of more than 25,000, with a total attendance of nearly 250,000. Proceeds from The Physics Show are used to bus students from local Title 1 schools to Foothill for special performances of the show.

== Notable alumni ==
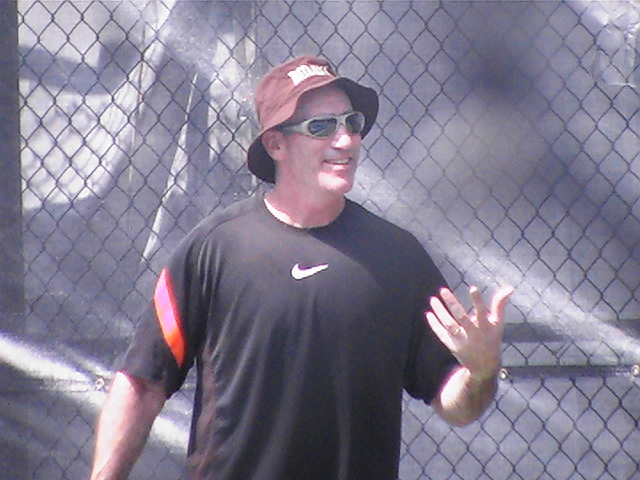
Brad Gilbert

- Rudy Arroyo (born 1950), Major League Baseball player
- Adrienne Barbeau (born 1945), actress in the TV series Maude, and former wife of the film director John Carpenter(dropped out)
- Rick Bladt (born 1946), Major League Baseball player
- Gene Block, chancellor of the University of California, Los Angeles
- Paul Bravo, professional soccer player, coach and executive
- Chrisann Brennan (born 1954), American artist and author of The Bite in the Apple, mother of Steve Jobs first child, Lisa Brennan-Jobs, the author of Small Fry
- Mike Brewer (born 1959), Major League Baseball player
- Tony Brewer (born 1957), Major League Baseball player
- Kirill Dmitriev (born 1975), Russian investment banker
- Dan Duran (born 1954), Major League Baseball player
- Chris Enos (born 1944), photographer
- Debbi Fields, entrepreneur, founder of Mrs. Fields
- Brad Gilbert (born 1961), American tennis player, former pro player, and coach to Andre Agassi
- Kevin Gutiérrez (born 1995), Mexican dual athlete (football and soccer), soccer ambassador
- Tim Hanley (born 1960), professional soccer player, and MLS assistant coach
- Jon Nakamatsu, American pianist
- Juice Newton (born 1952), musician
- Stu Pederson (born 1960), Major League Baseball player
- Fred Ramsdell (born 1960), immunologist, Nobel Prize-winner in Medicine/Physiology, 2025
- Chris Robinson, film director, music video director
- Steve Sampson (born 1957), soccer player, coach of the USMNT at the 1998 FIFA World Cup, and MLS champion coach
- Wayne Wang (born 1949), Hong Kong-born American film director

== See also ==
- California Community Colleges system
- KFJC
