= Scarlett (Cassidy novel) =

2006 novel by Cathy Cassidy

- First edition (publ. Puffin Books)
- Author: Cathy Cassidy
- Publisher: Puffin Books
- Publication date: 31 July 2006
- ISBN: 9780141320229

Scarlett is a 2006 novel by Cathy Cassidy. It won the 2007 Royal Mail Award for Scottish Children's Books in the 12–16 age group. It reached number 8 in the Ottakars sales chart for children's books in June 2006. Cassidy won the 2007 Scottish Children's Book Award (12–16) for this book.

== Summary ==
The plot revolves around the 12-year-old girl of the title, who is badly affected by the break-up of her parents. After leading a food fight at school, she is sent from London to live with her father in Ireland.

== Plot ==
Scarlett is a troubled 12-year-old girl who acts out and has attended five schools in two years. She had a brilliant life up until she was 10 years old when her father left them to go live in Ireland with his new partner Clare and her nine-year-old daughter Holly. This affects Scarlett deeply and, with encouragement from her mother, Scarlett grows very angry at her dad, tearing up birthday cards and various other presents given to her from him.

Scarlett acts out a lot in school and after her third suspension from Greenhall Academy, she is permanently excluded, due to her causing a riot in the school cafeteria, insulting dinner ladies, and throwing food around due to her being a vegetarian. Her mother is extremely disappointed and tells Scarlett she has no other choice but to live with her father. Scarlett protests, throws things, and shouts, but her mother stands her ground and sends her away.

Scarlett is determined to be as bad as possible when she gets there, to scare them and show her dad she has changed big time and how much his leaving has affected her. Her mother asks her not to tell her dad that she got her tongue pierced but Scarlett shows every intention of doing so.

Her father collects her from Ireland West Airport and she is set on not talking to him at all but in the car she breaks this silence accidentally. Her father persists in talking to her, being friendly and apologizing but Scarlett will not accept any of what he is saying.

When they get to the cottage, Scarlett discovers something very unexpected – Clare, her stepmother, is pregnant. Clare's daughter, Holly – Scarlett's stepsister – is a very bubbly and friendly nine-year-old, chatting to Scarlett, although she does not exactly get a very enthusiastic response.

For school the next day, Scarlett avoids it by pretending she forgot her pencil case and purposefully missing the bus she was supposed to take with Holly. Her father catches her in the house, however, and drives her to the school, very disappointed in her. Scarlett gets upset doing an Irish worksheet about "Mo Chlann" (English: My Family). She climbs out of the window and walks for miles. After receiving a phone call from Mum, she throws her mobile in the lough and becomes furious in the forest, eventually being rescued by Kian, a Traveller boy of about 13 or 14, on a black horse named Midnight. Scarlett's father tells her she is going to be home schooled, at least for the time being. She enjoys this as she gets to study at the lough, talking to Kian, drawing the different plants and naming them in different languages. She is progressing well and settling in with her new family.

Kian's father and uncle come looking for him but Scarlett tells them she doesn't know Kian. She apologizes to Kian and he accepts but says he will have to go back – he ran away after his mother died of cancer. They arrange to say goodbye at the lough.

The summer holidays have started and Holly asks Scarlett to pierce her nose. Scarlett refuses but when she gets blackmailed by Holly she agrees. Holly jumps at the last minute and the pin they were using slips, piercing a hole in Holly's lip by mistake.

Holly is taken to hospital and gets stitches, so the adults are very disappointed in Scarlett even though for once, she apologizes for her actions. The next day, Holly and Scarlett's dad head up to Galway for a dentist's appointment and to deliver handmade soap that Clare makes for a living. Scarlett helps Clare with her soap while Holly and her dad are gone and then Scarlett offers to contribute something towards Clare's quilt that she is making for the new baby – all the family put in a piece of their own clothing to stitch in. They go up to the attic and Scarlett discovers her father kept all her old dresses and toys although he was meant to throw them away.

Meanwhile, a lightning storm has started up and thunderous noises make them go back downstairs. On the way down the ladder, there is a blackout and Clare screams and falls down. After waking her up, Scarlett discovers Clare is in labor. She runs to the lough for Kian's help as it is just approaching the time they had set to say goodbye – one o'clock. He is nowhere to be seen but on her way back to the cottage she finds two American tourists who drive them to the hospital and let Scarlett use their mobile phone to call Scarlett's father and inform him of the recent events. Clare has a long labor and the baby girl is premature so is put in an incubator, to be on the safe side.

Scarlett kisses Kian and decides that she should go back home to London and is happy there at last.
