= GingerSnaps (novel) =

Book by Cathy Cassidy

- First edition
- Author: Cathy Cassidy
- Language: English
- Genre: Young adult fiction
- Publisher: Puffin
- Publication date: 2008
- Publication place: United Kingdom
- Media type: Print (Hardback & Paperback)
- Pages: 229pp (first edition, hardback)
- ISBN: 9780141338927
- Preceded by: Lucky Star
- Followed by: Shine On, Daizy Star
- Website: www.cathycassidy.com/books/gingersnaps/

GingerSnaps is a 2008 novel by Cathy Cassidy.

== Plot ==
The story starts with Ginger, an overweight child with no friends and red hair. Then the book forwards to when she's 12, popular and confident, having lost weight, found makeup, and hair-straighteners, and with a best friend, Shannon. Ginger is happy, until she and Shannon befriend a lonely girl from Ginger's old school, Emily Croft. Ginger finds that Shannon likes Emily more than her, making her upset, and breaking their friendship.

Meanwhile, Ginger meets Sam, a boy at her school that doesn't wear uniform and ditches class often. Shannon doesn't like him and thinks he's weird (Ginger later says that Shannon doesn't like him because he's the only boy that doesn't fall to her feet) but Ginger starts to, and they are secretly together. Mr. Hunter, their English teacher (who everyone likes but Sam, and Shannon has a crush on) announces that they will make a school magazine (S'cool). Shannon is the Editor. After the magazine is completed, the students throw a release party which falls on Shannon's 13th birthday. Shannon's parents aren't home at the party, so some of her friends bring in beer, and soon everyone starts to get drunk except Emily and Ginger. Mr. Hunter arrives and tries to calm things down, but it doesn't work. Sam also comes and Shannon tells him to get lost and says that Ginger thinks he's weird and is too nice to tell him. Ginger is shocked and Sam gets hurt and leaves. Ginger ends up crying. Shannon gets rejected by Mr. Hunter and then becomes upset.

Soon a fight starts up when the student photographer, Jas Kapoor, starts taking pictures of the party (part of his idea for the next issue of the magazine, "The truth behind teen parties") and he takes a picture of Andy Collins drinking and smoking with Shannon on his leg and also a picture of Ginger and Sam about to kiss under the staircase. Soon a neighbour calls the police, and Ginger calls Shannon's parents. Back at school, Ginger gets called to the principal's office. Her parents are called in too. She doesn't know what she is in trouble for. The principal brings out a picture from the party with Mr. Hunter and his arm over her shoulder (which was just Mr. Hunter trying to comfort her after everything started to go wrong) and they ask her many questions but when Jas Kapoor was called in, he said that the picture was edited and this never happened. Soon Shannon starts telling everyone lies about Mr. Hunter that he was after herself and Ginger, and parents get worried about having Mr. Hunter teaching their children. Soon Mr. Hunter leaves, even though he didn't do anything. Six weeks after the party, Shannon talks to Ginger saying that she should come hang out with her again (Ginger has become friends with people Shannon call 'freaks', Sam and Ginger and has now started dating openly) but Ginger refuses, and later thinks that Shannon is the one at loss.

Afterwards, Shannon gets a new 'friend' Nisha Choudhury, which in Ginger's words, is 'an experiment, like Emily, and me.' But Ginger is happy with her new boyfriend Sam and the band all of them started.
