= Cherry Crush (novel) =

Book by Cathy Cassidy

- Author: Cathy Cassidy
- Language: English
- Genre: Young adult fiction
- Publisher: Puffin Books
- Publication date: 2 September 2010
- Publication place: England, United Kingdom
- Followed by: Marshmallow Skye

Cherry Crush is a British novel written by the English author Cathy Cassidy. It is the first book in the Chocolate Box Girls series. The book revolves around the suddenly upturned life of Cherry Costello who just moved to Somerset with her father to live with her father's girlfriend Charlotte Tanberry. When she arrives there, she realizes she has four new sisters. The plot deals with her attraction to her new stepsister's boyfriend Shay, while maintaining her desire to fit in.

== Conception ==
Cassidy wanted to write a book about chocolate, choosing to write about five different individuals and their love of chocolate. The Chocolate Box Girls are her first series of books, excluding Cassidy's series, Daizy Starr, and two loosely linked books, Dizzy and Lucky Star.

== Synopsis ==
The book starts when Cherry and her father Paddy are about to move to Somerset. They move in with Paddy's girlfriend Charlotte and her four daughters; Skye, Summer, Coco, and Honey. Charlotte and Paddy also want to start their dream business: making chocolate. In Tanglewood, Charlotte's home, Cherry meets Shay Fletcher and begins to develop a crush on him. However, Shay already has a girlfriend: Charlotte's spiteful eldest daughter, Honey. Cherry knows her friendship with Shay is dangerous. She tries to impress and make her stepsisters like her by telling lies about the luxurious life she used to lead back in Glasgow. Soon Cherry learns that the girls have already sensed she is lying and that they liked her better when she was the real Cherry instead of Cherry the liar. Honey and Cherry have many fights, mainly because she suspects that Cherry and Shay are becoming too close to each other. The girls and Charlotte also assist Paddy in starting a chocolate business by organizing a successful chocolate festival, and Paddy's chocolates are in high demand. The story concludes with Shay and Cherry traveling by canoe after Cherry is slapped by Honey and her lies as the canoe breaks down. They end up spending the night together in a cave and are found in the morning. Shay's dad finally realizes his son's value and decides not to be hard on him. After that, Shay and Cherry end up becoming a couple.

== Sequels ==
Five books have been published for The Chocolate Box Girls game.

Cherry Crush's immediate sequel, Marshmallow Skye, has already been published, and the third book in the series, Summer's Dream was released on 7 June 2012.

The last three books are Coco Caramel, Sweet Honey and Fortune Cookie. Coco Caramel was released in June 2013, Sweet Honey was released in 2014 and Fortune Cookie was released in June 2015.
