= Summer's Dream =

Book by Cathy Cassidy

DIN Inc.
- Author: Cathy Cassidy
- Language: English
- Genre: Young adult fiction
- Publisher: Penguin Books
- Publication date: 2012
- Publication place: England, United Kingdom
- Preceded by: Marshmallow Skye
- Followed by: Bittersweet

Summer's Dream is a preteen/teen novel published in 2012 by Cathy Cassidy.

The first-person narrative follows a girl named Summer Tanberry, who dreams of going to ballet school and is willing to sacrifice everything to make that dream come true. She soon becomes anorexic.

== Plot Synopsis ==
Summer wants to be a ballet dancer. This had been her wish for the time being. Like other young women, Summer feels pressure to meet certain social beauty standards. She believes that people are only seen as beautiful if they wear small clothing size, such as a size one or two. This leads her to struggle with her self-image as she tries to match these specific expectations. She believed that to achieve her goal as a professional dancer, she must have a body sitting according to the standards of the society, otherwise her dreams of becoming a famous dancer would never happen. While trying to achieve this goal she finds the rest of her life simply falling apart.

== Plot summary ==
The book begins with Paddy and Charlotte getting married, after which Charlotte's mother Grandma Kate surprises them with tickets for a honeymoon to Peru for three weeks. A few days later Summer's dance teacher, Miss Elise, surprises her and two other students, including Summer's friend Jodie, with a visit from ex-ballerina Sylvie Rochelle, who offers them a chance to audition for a place at her prestigious dance school, Rochelle Academy. Remembering a previously failed audition to get into the Royal Ballet School, during which Jodie was also rejected for not being 'the right shape,' Summer makes the decision to eat more healthily.

What starts out as cutting junk food from her diet soon progresses to skipping meals, and Summer starts experiencing dizzy spells and a drop in her dancing performance. Meanwhile Skye has grown close to Jamie Finch, son of a film producer who is working locally during the holidays. Summer's boyfriend Aaron is unsupportive of Summer's aspirations to become a dancer. After learning he made a bet with classmate Alfie Anderson that she would fail her audition, Summer breaks up with him.

Jodie finds out about Summer's extreme dieting; Summer believes her reaction to be fuelled by jealousy and stops talking to her. However she grows closer to Alfie, who has also become aware of her not eating properly. Summer's weight loss is noticed by Skye and Miss Elise, who tells her she is pushing herself too hard. Despite this, Summer performs well at her audition and is told by Sylvie Rochelle to expect good news when getting a reply.

During a party thrown in her honour, Summer surprises Honey, who is smoking in the barn with a member of the film crew. Honey confronts Summer about her dieting and tells her she has anorexia. During the argument, a dropped cigarette causes a fire which nearly burns down the chocolate workshop. Summer suffers a fainting spell while trying to put it out, after which Honey tries to buy a plane ticket to run away to Australia, where her father is. Doctors notice that Summer is underweight and she is referred to a specialist. Unable to attend Rochelle Academy as she begins treatment, the book ends with Summer managing to eat at a picnic with Alfie, grieving for her lost dream yet hopeful for her future.

== Main characters ==
- Summer Tanberry - Summer is a dedicated dancer and practices ballet regularly. After her friend Jodie auditions for the Royal Ballet School and gets rejected due to her weight, Summer decides that ballet dancers must remain slim and becomes anorexic.
- Alfie Anderson - Summer's secret admirer and her enemy since a long time. Alfie has a crush on Summer, but she doesn't notice him. Later to become Summer's boyfriend
- Honey Tanberry - Summer's older sister. Honey and Summer have a difficult relationship, but Honey is concerned about Summer's health.
- Skye Tanberry - Summer's twin sister. Their once strong relationship is falling to pieces. Skye is the first to notice Summer's disorder.
- Miss Elise - Summer's dance teacher. Had a good relationship until Summer decided she was making her fail.
- Jodie Waters - Summer's best friend who tries to help her get past her disorder.
