= For All the People =

2009 book by John Curl

For All the People: Uncovering the Hidden History of Cooperation, Cooperative Movements, and Communalism in America
- First edition
- Author: John Curl
- Language: English
- Subject: Economics, History, Politics
- Publisher: PM Press
- Publication date: 2009, 2012
- Publication place: United States
- Media type: Print
- Pages: 608 (second edition)
- ISBN: 978-1-60486-582-0 (paperback)

For All the People: Uncovering the Hidden History of Cooperation, Cooperative Movements, and Communalism in America is a non-fiction book by John Curl which "methodically and authoritatively traces the hidden history of cooperatives, cooperation and communalism in US history." "Cooperation, not competition, resounded as the dominant chord across the continent," Curl writes. Cooperatives were widespread throughout American history, with workers uniting cooperatively in a wide range of industries.

== Reviews ==
"New generations of readers will find this a fascinating account, and aging co-opers like myself will understand better what we did, what we tried to do, where we succeeded and where we failed. Get this book and read it, Curl will do you good.” —Paul Buhle, coeditor of the Encyclopedia of the American Left.

"It is indeed inspiring, in the face of all the misguided praise of 'the market', to be reminded by John Curl's new book of the noble history of cooperative work in the United States." —Howard Zinn, author of A People's History of the United States

"John Curl’s book is to be welcomed for its efforts to catalogue the various forms of co-operatives and communalism in the USA over its entire recorded history." -Prof. Greg Patmore, Professor of Business and Labour History, University of Sydney
