= Marlo Morgan =

American author (born 1937)

Marlo Morgan (born September 29, 1937) is an American author, best known for the bestselling book Mutant Message Down Under. She has also written Message from Forever (1998), another novel based on Australian Aboriginal themes. In 1996, she was confronted about the veracity of her book by Aboriginal protesters and stated that she never meant to hurt any of the people described in her book, whom she also stated that she loved.

== Mutant Message Down Under ==
Morgan self-published a book in 1990 titled Mutant Message Down Under, which purported to chronicle the journey of a middle-aged, white, American woman with a group of 62 desert Aborigines, the "Real People", across the continent of Australia. The author states the book was written after the fact inspired by actual experience.

Mutant Message Down Under quickly attained word of mouth popularity with the New Age movement in the United States, was picked up for bookstore distribution by Bookpeople, then consequently picked up by giant publishing firm HarperCollins, and marketed as fiction by them. Nearly a million copies of the HarperCollins publication have been sold around the world. Morgan completed many lecture tours promoting the book in the United States and Europe. In her lectures Morgan speaks of her actual experience with the "Real People" and states she is an Aborigine.

According to the 90-page report published by the Perth-based Dumbartung Aboriginal Corporation, a survey of Aboriginal groups in Central and Western Australia failed to uncover any indication whatsoever of Morgan's presence in the area or of the existence of the "Real People" tribe. They claim that Aboriginal groups believe Morgan's desert journey to be fabricated and that her book and teaching lack credibility. The Dumbartung Aboriginal Corporation stated that it was deeply offensive to Aboriginal people for a white person to be misrepresenting Aboriginal culture for self-promotion and profit. Aboriginal people expressed anger that Morgan's false message is being accepted as fact by a naïve North American and European market and were extremely concerned about the resulting long-term implications for their culture.

In 1996 a group of Aboriginal elders, seriously disturbed by the book's implications, received a grant to travel to the States and confront Morgan about her book and to try to prevent a Hollywood-isation of it. She admitted publicly that she had faked it but this received little publicity in the USA. The Aboriginal people engaging in this discourse are angry that Morgan's book continues to be promoted and sold widely, because they state it gives a false picture of their traditional cultures and of their current political and social status. They regard this as damaging to their struggle for survival.
