= Where There Is No Doctor =

1970 healthcare manual

Where There Is No Doctor: A Village Health Care Handbook
- Author: David Werner; Carol Thuman; Jane Maxwell
- Language: English
- Subject: Health care
- Publisher: Hesperian Health Guides
- Publication date: Second revised edition: 1992. Fifteenth revised printing: November 2017
- Publication place: United States
- Pages: 512
- ISBN: 978-0-942364-15-6
- OCLC: 25592300
- Dewey Decimal: 610 20
- LC Class: RC81 .W4813 1992

Where There Is No Doctor: A Village Health Care Handbook is a healthcare manual published by Hesperian Health Guides. Based on David Werner's experiences at his Project Piaxtla in western Mexico, it was originally written in 1970 in Spanish as Donde No Hay Doctor. It has since been revised multiple times, sold over one million copies, and been translated into over 100 languages. The book is available for purchase as a book or CD, and can be downloaded as a PDF for free.

Its distribution is worldwide. In Uzbekistan, a United States Agency for International Development grant enabled a team under Dr. Donald Elsworth and Robert Graves of Central Asian Free Exchange to translate the book into Uzbek. The U.S. Peace Corps has also distributed it in The Gambia.

In 2012, Hesperian Health Guides launched their Digital Commons, and health manuals, including Where There Is No Doctor, which could at one time be downloaded in 26 different languages, including Arabic, Filipino, Khmer, Lao, Portuguese, Spanish, and Urdu.

== Content ==
The book covers diarrhoea, malaria, bone fractures, ringworm, and others. Special emphasis is placed on hygiene, a healthy diet and vaccinations. The new edition includes information about some additional health problems, such as AIDS, dengue fever, complications from abortion, and drug addiction, and covers both childbirth and family planning.

== Reception ==
In the British Medical Journal, a 1998 review said:

Chances are that if you visited a remote district hospital in a developing country you would find a well thumbed copy of Where There is No Doctor in its library. The book is intended primarily for village health workers, but generations of doctors and medical missionaries who have worked in under-resourced communities globally will vouch for its value in providing concise reliable information.

The book was referenced in a 2004 article in The Lancet, entitled "Can we achieve health information for all by 2015?" The authors wrote that:

A community health worker may find a single copy of Where There is No Doctor, adapted and written in the local language, more useful than access to thousands of international journals.

In the Journal of the American Medical Association, a 2010 review said,

it is still not known if the book effectively improves health. [However,] In most of the world, where physicians are not available and diseases are rampant, the status quo is unacceptable. Until better solutions are created, Where There is No Doctor is probably a useful stop-gap measure.
