= Hesperian Health Guides =

US-based non-profit organization

- Founded: 1973
- Founder: David Werner
- Country of origin: United States
- Headquarters location: Berkeley, California
- Publication types: Books
- Nonfiction topics: Health
- Official website: hesperian.org

Hesperian Health Guides, formerly known as Hesperian Foundation, is a nongovernmental non-profit organization publishing health guides for trained and untrained people to care for themselves and others. The foundation is based in Berkeley, California. Among their best-selling publications is Where There is No Doctor, first published in 1973 and updated every few years. The book has been translated to more than 80 languages and the World Health Organization estimates that it may be the most widely used public health manual in the world.

Hesperian's publications are known for their simplicity of expression and illustrations, both intended to make them suitable for use by ordinary people in home and community contexts. Where There is No Doctor was praised by those who felt it "demystified and politicized health care," communicating that "although some health problems require expert medical attention, there is much that we can do on our own to positively affect our health," a message also communicated in subsequent works. As of 2011, the organization had a rating of four out of four stars from Charity Navigator for the efficient use of donated funds.

== Collaborations ==
Hesperian often works with other organizations to create new publications and revise older ones. The short work Water for Life: Community Water Security was published in conjunction with the United Nations Development Program. In 2006, Hesperian received a US$40,000 grant from the Rockefeller Brothers Fund to develop a book on environmental health, and in 2004 the Firelight Foundation provided a small grant to fund the revision of the 1999 book HIV, Health, and Your Community.

Complementing its other activities, the organization includes a gratis fund that sends free copies of its publications to those who cannot afford them, a translation fund providing seed grants to cover the costs of local translation and adaptation in international communities, and a grant fund to assist health education programs in developing creative ways to use Hesperian publications by such means as street theater and radio broadcasts. Access to the publications also is fostered through the organization's policy of permitting copying, reproduction or adaptation of any part of a publication to meet local needs "provided the parts reproduced are distributed free or at cost—not for profit," resulting in the availability of online copies of various publications.

Hesperian Health Guides is an official supporting organization of Healthcare Information For All by 2015.

== Reviews ==
Hesperian Health Guides "is responsible for countless miracles in various parts of the world by providing basic health care books to those who either cannot afford medical treatment or cannot survive the long, arduous journey to the nearest doctor," says the San Francisco Chronicle.

Hesperian's publications are widely praised by a variety of sources, and Hesperian involves organizations from all over the world in the development of its books. "Where There Is No Doctor is an indispensable resource... This book has been, quite literally, a lifesaver for the poor—even where there is a doctor." says Paul Farmer, Professor of Social Medicine, Harvard Medical School. "Helping Children Who are Deaf" was praised in The Journal of Deaf Studies and Deaf Education for its "broad perspective. Parents, teachers, deaf adults, and health care workers from around the world—over 17 countries—advised and reviewed draft materials of the book. A very long and impressive list of individuals and organizations from Bangladesh to Zimbabwe are given credit and thanks for sharing their experiences, stories, and knowledge." Another review criticized the book as not sufficiently overcoming Western cultural assumptions about areas such as privacy.

== Selected publications ==
Hesperian released Health Actions for Women in February 2015; a 352-page print book and online resource that shares proven strategies and activities to help women and men facilitate community discussions and action around such topics as family planning, sexuality, HIV, and gender-based violence—even in challenging settings where education and organizing for women's and girls' health may be difficult or dangerous.

In May 2015 Hesperian also released "Workers' Guide to Health and Safety" to put occupational safety and health information into a form that can be used by those most affected by workplace hazards—the workers themselves. From low wages to sexual harassment, from ergonomics to fire safety, from chemical exposure at work to pollution outside the plant, this book draws on the experiences of factory workers and their communities around the world to provide actionable tools to help organize for short- and long-term improvements. Developed in collaboration with factory workers and their advocates, workers, educators, and organizers will find a wealth of practical and sustainable information in this one-of-a-kind resource.

=== English ===
- Where there is no doctor
- Where women have no doctor
- Where there is no dentist
- A book for midwives
- HIV, health and your community
- Disabled village children: A guide for community health workers, rehabilitation workers, and families
- Helping children who are blind: Family and community support for children with vision problems
- Helping children who are deaf: Family and community support for children who do not hear well
- A health handbook for women with disabilities
- Water for life: Community water security
- Helping health workers learn
- Sanitation and cleanliness for a healthy environment
- Pesticides are poison

=== Other languages ===
Most of the titles produced by Hesperian are available in Spanish. Publications are also available in over 80 other languages:

- Albanian
- Amharic
- Arabic
- Armenian
- Aymara
- Azeri
- Bambara
- Bangla
- Bicol
- Burmese
- Cebuano
- Chichewa
- Chinese
- Haitian Creole
- Croatian
- Dari
- Esperanto
- Farsi
- Filipino
- Fon
- French
- Fulfulde
- Georgian
- German
- Gujarati
- Hausa
- Hiligaynon
- Hindi
- Iban
- Igbo
- Ilongo
- Indonesian
- Italian
- Japanese
- Jinghpaw
- Kannada
- Karakalpak
- Khmer
- Kinyarwanda
- Kirundi
- Korean
- Kurdish
- Kwangali
- Kyrgyz
- Lao
- Luganda
- Luhya
- Macedonian
- Malagasy
- Malayalam
- Malaysian
- Malinke
- Marathi
- Mayangna
- Miskito
- Mon
- Mongolian
- Naga
- Nande
- Ndebele
- Nepali
- Oriya
- Oromo
- Oshivambo
- Pashto
- Portuguese
- Quechua
- Romanian
- Rukiga
- Russian
- Samoan
- Serbian
- Shan
- Shona
- Shuar
- Sindhi
- Sinhala
- Somali
- Swahili
- Tamil
- Telugu
- Tetum
- Thai
- Tibetan
- Tigrinya
- Tok Pisin
- Turkish
- Turkmen
- Tzotzil
- Urdu
- Uzbek
- Vietnamese
- Wolof
- Yoruba
- Zulu
