= Est: The Steersman Handbook =

Book by Leslie Stevens

est: The Steersman Handbook
- Book cover
- Author: L. Clark Stevens
- Language: English
- Subject: Utopia
- Genre: Science fiction
- Publisher: Bantam Books, Capricorn Press
- Publication date: 1970, 1971
- Publication place: United States
- Media type: Paperback
- Pages: 154

est: The Steersman Handbook, Charts of the Coming Decade of Conflict is a work of science fiction cast as a nonfictional study. Its author, credited as L. Clark Stevens, usually went by the name Leslie Stevens. Stevens has a long list of credits in the entertainment industry, having worked on, among other productions, The Outer Limits. The book was published in paperback in 1970, and reprinted in 1971.

== Synopsis ==
The "est" in the book's title refers to what Stevens described as "Electronic Social Transformation". The book described a future society and the rise of what Stevens described as the "est people". The "est people" were a new generation of postliterate humans who were to bring about a "transformation" of society. The "est people" were to be technically minded, eclectic, and computer literate. They would possess qualities necessary for social transformation, integral to Earth's survival. Individuals named as examples of "est people" in the book included R. Buckminster Fuller, Jiddu Krishnamurti, Ralph Nader, Marshall McLuhan, Malcolm X, Albert Einstein, Lewis Mumford, and Eric Hoffer.

== Reception ==
Dean Gengle wrote in his book, The Netweaver's Sourcebook, that the book: "..did more to liberate media-created hippies than just about any other work of its time." The book has also been referenced in later sociological evaluations of potential paths for society, including Michael Marien's Societal Directions and Alternatives, and Gurth Higgin's Symptoms of Tomorrow. The book's publisher, Capricorn Press or "Capra Press", would come to be better known, having published the work.

Though the book was speculative in nature, its author, Stevens was subsequently consulted on issues relating to the future of the planet's economic, ecological and energy systems. The book was later referenced by Mark Hinshaw in a piece describing two potential futures, who cited Steven's term "Electronic Social Transformation".

== Erhard Seminars Training ==
Secondary sources have stated that the title of this work inspired Werner Erhard to name his company Erhard Seminars Training, or est for short, and to refer to it as such in lower-case. Peter Occhiogrosso writes in The Joy of Sects that Erhard borrowed the initials, "lowercase and all", from the book. In his book Larson's Book of World Religions and Alternative Spirituality, Bob Larson refers to Erhard's friend Bill Thaw in citing the same information. According to Steven Pressman's book, Outrageous Betrayal, Werner Erhard made other staff members on his Mind Dynamics sales team read the book.

== See also ==
- est and The Forum in popular culture
