= Chrisann Brennan =

American memoirist and painter (born 1954)

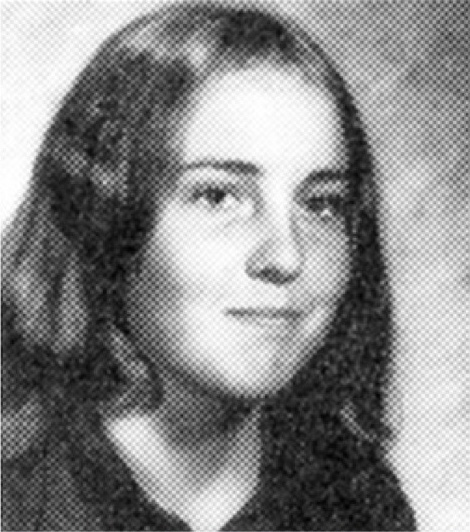
- Chrisann Brennan in the 1972 edition of the Pegasus yearbook produced by Homestead High School
- Born: September 29, 1954 (age 72); Dayton, Ohio, U.S.
- Occupation: Painter
- Partner: Steve Jobs (1972–1977)
- Children: Lisa Brennan-Jobs
- Writing career
- Notable work: The Bite in the Apple (memoir)

Chrisann Brennan (born September 29, 1954) is an American painter. She is also the author of The Bite in the Apple (2013) an autobiography about her relationship with Steve Jobs, Apple co-founder.

== Family ==
Brennan was born in Dayton, Ohio, in 1954, one of four daughters of James Richard Brennan and Virginia Lavern Rickey. Chrisann was named after the flower chrysanthemum.

Her father worked for Sylvania and the family lived in a number of places, including Colorado Springs and Nebraska. They eventually settled in Sunnyvale, California. Her parents divorced after their later move to Buffalo, New York. Brennan attended Homestead High School in Cupertino, California.

== Education and early life ==
Brennan and Jobs began a relationship in 1972 when they were in high school. Brennan remained involved with Jobs through his short time at Reed College. In mid-1973, Jobs moved back to the San Francisco Bay Area. The couple were involved but also continued to see other people.

After Brennan graduated from high school, she visited Jobs at the All One Farm, a commune in Oregon. She was deeply influenced by the experience of meeting and working with the people there.

In early 1975, Brennan became involved with a Zen Buddhist community in Los Altos, California. Through it, she would meet and work with Zen master Kobun. Brennan was also studying art at Foothill College, where she worked with Gordon Holler.

At this time, she fell in love with Greg Calhoun (a former Reed classmate of Jobs), who had come to visit from the All One Farm. Brennan moved to the Oregon commune where she lived with Calhoun. They eventually moved back to the Bay Area, then traveled for a year through India. Their relationship had ended by the time she returned to the United States.

== Apple (1977) ==
After her return from India, Brennan visited Jobs, whom she considered a friend, where he was still living with his parents. During this period the pair revived their affair. Brennan noted changes in him that she attributes to his study with Kōbun Chino Otogawa, whom she was also still following. Jobs was developing a computer and displayed a prototype Apple for Brennan and his parents in their living room.

Brennan saw that Jobs was deeply involved in Apple and Kōbun. By early 1977, she and Jobs spent time together at her home at Duveneck Ranch in Los Altos. The ranch served as a hostel and environmental education center. Brennan worked there as a teacher for inner-city children who came to learn about the farm.

As Jobs and Apple became more successful, his relationship with Brennan grew more complex. In 1977 Brennan, Jobs and Daniel Kottke moved into a house near the Apple office in Cupertino.

Jobs wanted the three to live together. Brennan said, "Steve told me that he didn't want to get a house with just the two of us because it felt insufficient to him. Steve wanted his buddy Daniel to live with him because he believed it would break up the intensity of what wasn't working between us. Our relationship was running hot and cold. We were completely crazy about each other and utterly bored in turns. I had suggested to Steve that we separate, but he told me that he just couldn't bring himself to say good-bye." Jobs initially suggested that each person have a separate room. Brennan has said that, "I recalled how awful he was becoming and how I was starting to flounder".

Even then, she had planned to commit to becoming an artist. But, she needed work and took a position at Apple in the Shipping Department. She was part of a team that tested, assembled, and shipped Apple IIs, with Mark Johnson and Bob Martinengo. She also took art classes at nearby De Anza College.

Jobs became increasingly consumed by his position with Apple, and Brennan considered ending their relationship. In October 1977, Brennan was recruited by Rod Holt to take "a paid apprenticeship designing blueprints for the Apples". Both Holt and Jobs believed that the position would make use of her artistic abilities.

Brennan had just learned that she was pregnant and knew Jobs was the father. It took her a few days to tell him. She said that his face "turned ugly" at the news. According to Brennan, later, at the beginning of her third trimester, Jobs said: "I never wanted to ask that you get an abortion. I just didn't want to do that." He refused to discuss the pregnancy with her.

Brennan felt confused about what to do. She was estranged from her mother and afraid to discuss the pregnancy with her father. She was not comfortable about the idea of abortion. She chose to talk with Kōbun, who encouraged her to have and keep the baby, saying he would lend support.

Meanwhile, Holt waited for her decision. Brennan said Jobs continued to encourage her to take the internship, but she felt conflicted about being pregnant at Apple with his baby, and turned it down. She decided to leave Apple, as Jobs said he would not help with the child.

== Work ==
Brennan went on welfare and cleaned houses to earn money. She sometimes asked Jobs for money, but he always refused. Brennan hid her pregnancy for as long as she could, lived in a variety of homes, and continued her work with Zen meditation.

At the same time, she said that Jobs was suggesting that she "slept around and he was infertile, which meant that this could not be his child". A few weeks before she was due, Brennan was invited to have her baby at All One Farm in Oregon and she accepted the offer.

At the age of 23, Brennan gave birth to her daughter, Lisa Brennan, on May 17, 1978. Jobs did not attend the birth. He eventually visited after he was contacted by Robert Friedland, their mutual friend and owner of All One Farm.

While distant, Jobs talked with Brennan on a name for the baby. She suggested "Lisa" and says that Jobs was very attached to this name, while he "was also publicly denying paternity". She discovered later that Jobs was preparing to unveil a new kind of computer that he wanted to give a female name. She said that she never gave him permission to use the baby's name for a computer and he hid the plans from her. Jobs worked with his team to come up with the phrase, "Local Integrated System Architecture" as an alternative explanation for the Apple Lisa. (Decades later, however, Jobs told his biographer Walter Isaacson that "obviously, it was named for my daughter").

Brennan explored adoption both before and after Lisa's birth but ultimately decided to keep the baby. Once, while she was staying with friends in the Bay Area, Jobs stopped by to see her. Brennan said that during a walk Jobs said to her, "I am really sorry. I'll be back, this thing with Apple will be over when I'm about thirty. I am really, really sorry." Around the same time, she met with Kōbun, who distanced himself. He did not fulfill his promise to help her once the baby was born.

Brennan was intensely criticized by Jobs, who claimed that "she doesn't want money, she just wants me". According to Brennan, Apple's Mike Scott wanted Jobs to give her money, while other Apple executives "advised him to ignore me or fight if I tried to go after a paternity settlement". Brennan said that later, after Jobs was forced out of Apple, "he apologized many times over for this behavior. He said that he never took responsibility when he should have and that he was sorry."

By that time, Jobs had developed a strong relationship with Lisa. She wanted her name changed to reflect his paternity and he agreed. He had her name on her birth certificate changed from Lisa Brennan to Lisa Brennan-Jobs.

When Lisa was a baby, Jobs continued to deny paternity. He was required to take a DNA paternity test, which confirmed that he was her father. The court required him to give Brennan $385 a month child support and return the money she had received from welfare. Jobs gave her $500 a month when Apple went public, and he became a millionaire.

Brennan was then working as a waitress in Palo Alto. In 1982 she agreed to an interview with Michael Moritz for Time magazine, which was to feature Jobs as its 1982 Person of the Year special (to be published on January 3, 1983)

She believes that her honesty about Jobs led to Time passing him over for "Person of the Year". Instead Time featured the "Machine of the Year: The Computer Moves In". In the issue, Jobs questioned the reliability of the paternity test. (The "probability of paternity for Jobs, Steven ... is 94.1%"). Jobs said that "28% of the male population of the United States could be the father". Time also noted that "the baby girl and the machine on which Apple has placed so much hope for the future share the same name: Lisa". After this issue, Brennan "didn't pay much attention to Steve's career again".

Over the years, Brennan and Jobs developed a working relationship to co-parent Lisa, particularly after he was forced out of Apple. Brennan credits the change in him to the influence of his newly found biological sister, Mona Simpson. She worked to develop the relationship between Lisa and Jobs.

According to a 2015 Fortune article, Brennan wrote a letter to Jobs in 2005, and another in 2009, in which she said she would abandon writing her memoirs if Jobs would supply her with financial compensation of US$28 million for the suffering she went through as a single mother.

== Painter ==
During the late 1980s, Brennan decided to finish her formal education and began to study at the California College of Arts and Crafts (where she was able to transfer her units from Foothill College). She asked Jobs to pay her tuition. He agreed to this request and according to Brennan was quite happy to do so, as part of his developing relationship with Lisa. In 1989, she transferred to the San Francisco Art Institute.

Brennan has lived in Monterey, California, while working as a professional painter. She describes her art as "light encoded paintings" and works mostly on commission for either private or corporate parties. She has also created murals for the Ronald McDonald House, Los Angeles County Hospital, Massachusetts General Hospital in Boston, and Packard Children's Hospital. Brennan stated that painting is "a language for me. Letters are form, and paintings are documents for information. When I mix those two, I'm happy. It gets me out of the normal way, which is what I want to do."

== Works ==
- Brennan, Chrisann. The Bite in the Apple. New York: St. Martin's Press, 2013.
- Brennan, Chrisann (October 27, 2011). "Jobs at 17: Nerd, Poet, Romantic". NYDailyNews India edition. first published in Rolling Stone. p. 42. Archived from the original on April 25, 2012. The Brennan piece is a sidebar (scroll down the page) of the main article: "The Steve Jobs Nobody Knew".

== Representation in other media ==
Brennan was portrayed as a character in films about Jobs. She was played by Gema Zamprogna in Pirates of Silicon Valley, by Ahna O'Reilly in Jobs, and by Katherine Waterston in Steve Jobs.

She is a main character in the opera The (R)evolution of Steve Jobs.
