= John Curl =

American writer and historian

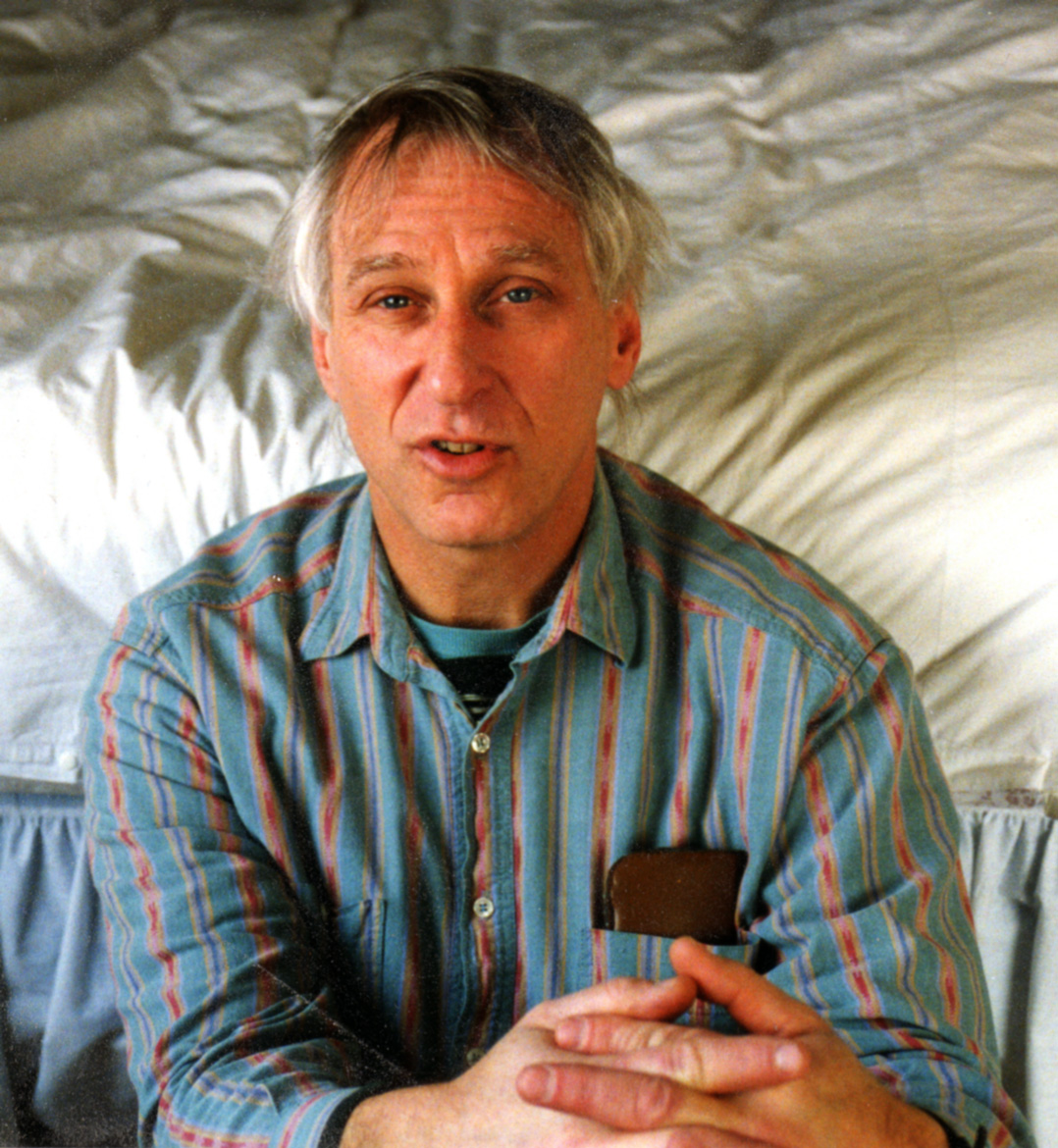
- Born: September 10, 1940 (age 86); New York City
- Education: City College of New York

John Curl is an American poet, historian, memoirist, translator and political activist. His writing focuses on cooperative movements, communal living, social history and Indigenous American cultures. His books include For All the People: Uncovering the Hidden History of Cooperation, Cooperative Movements, and Communalism in America (2009) and Memories of Drop City: The First Hippie Commune of the 1960s and the Summer of Love (2007). He has also translated poetry associated with ancient Aztec, Maya and Inca cultures.

== Early life and education ==
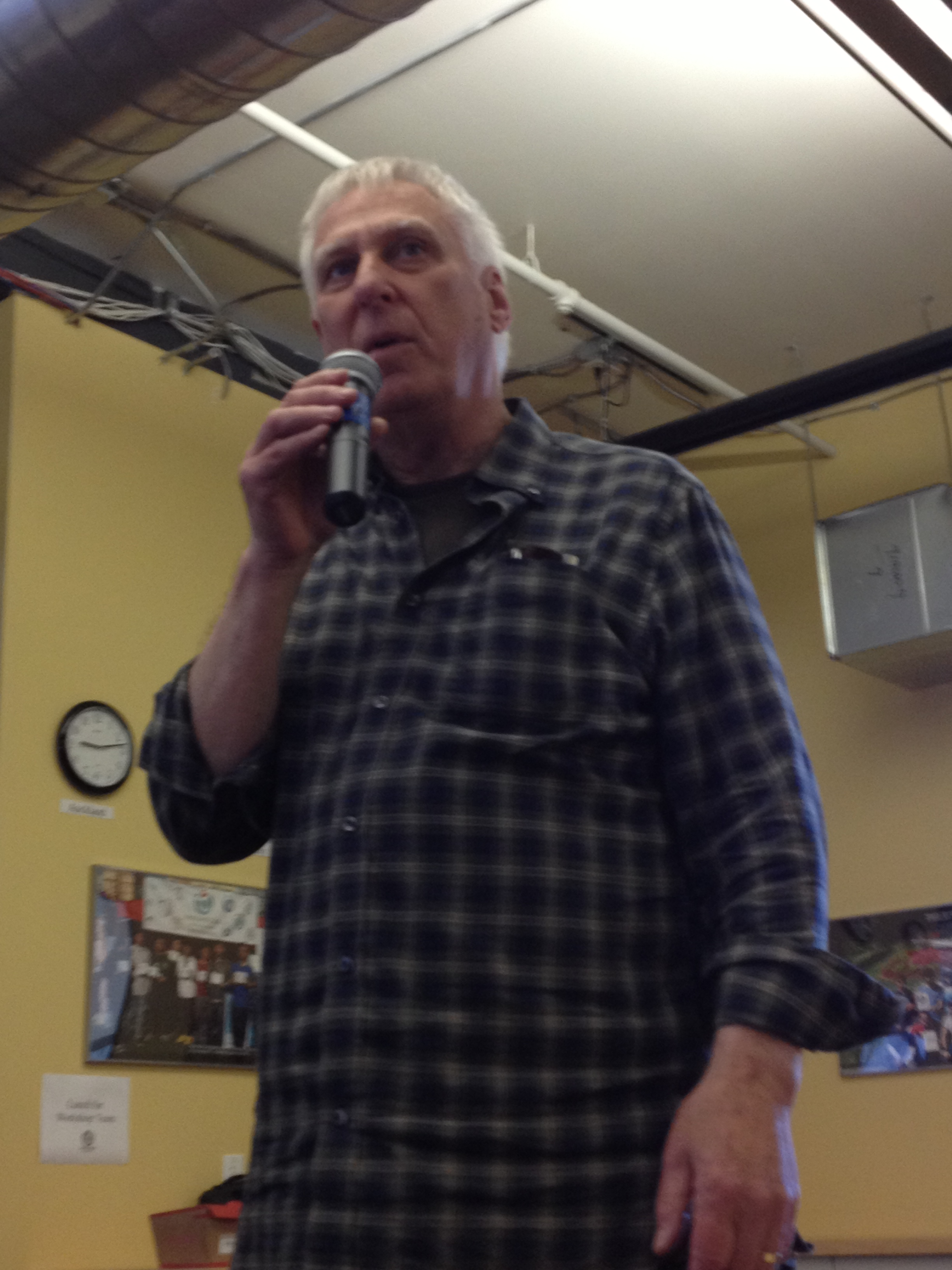
John Curl speaking at the Wikimedia Foundation in 2013

Curl was born in New York City on September 10, 1940, and grew up in Manhattan and rural New Jersey. He received his Bachelor's degree in comparative literature from City College of New York in 1965. He also spent a semester at the Sorbonne in Paris.

In the 1960s, Curl became involved in the countercultural movement and lived at Drop City, an experimental commune in Colorado, from 1966 to 1969.

== Career and activism ==
Curl moved to the San Francisco Bay Area in 1971. He worked as a professional woodworker and became involved in cooperative enterprises and collective organizations. From 1974, he worked at Heartwood Cooperative Woodshop in Berkeley, California, while continuing to write poetry, history and political commentary.

He published History of Work Cooperation in America in 1980 and History of Collectivity in the San Francisco Bay Area in 1982. During the 1980s, he was associated with the InterCollective and edited the Collective Directory, which documented cooperative and collective organizations.

He served as a city planning commissioner and chaired West Berkeley Artisans and Industrial Companies. He was a founding member of Berkeley's Indigenous Peoples' Day Committee, which organizes events associated with the annual observance. He has also served on the boards of PEN Oakland and PEN Center USA.

He co-hosted the radio programme Poetry for the People on KPOO in San Francisco in 1979–1980 and edited the online literary publication Red Coral from 1999 to 2003. His play The Trial of Christopher Columbus was produced by the PEN Oakland Writers Theater in 2009.

== Works ==
=== Historical writing ===
Curl’s historical writing focuses on cooperation, collective ownership and communal organization in American history. His books History of Work Cooperation in America (1980) examines cooperative work arrangements, while History of Collectivity in the San Francisco Bay Area (1982) documents collective organizations in the region.

His book For All the People: Uncovering the Hidden History of Cooperation, Cooperative Movements, and Communalism in America was published by PM Press in 2009, with a second edition released in 2012. It examines the history of worker cooperatives, mutual aid and communal movements in the United States. The second edition includes a foreword by writer Ishmael Reed.

Curl also wrote Indigenous Peoples Day: Handbook for Activists & Documentary History (2017), which focuses on campaigns to establish Indigenous Peoples’ Day and debates surrounding the commemoration of Christopher Columbus.

=== Poetry and literature ===
Curl has published poetry since the 1960s. His early collections include Change/Tears (1967), Commu 1 (1971) and Insurrection/Resurrection (1975). Later collections include The San Francisco General Strike (1978), Ride the Wind (1979), Cosmic Athletics (1980), Tidal News (1982), Decade: The 1990s (1987), Columbus in the Bay of Pigs (1991) and Scorched Birth (2004).

His poetry focuses on political conflict, social change, environmental concerns and historical memory. Columbus in the Bay of Pigs centered on the history and politics of the Americas, while Revolutionary Alchemy (2012) depict poetry reflecting his political and social concerns. His later work includes Yoga Sutras of Fidel Castro (2013) and Rainbow Weather: Poems for Environmental Healing (2022).

Curl's poetry has been published in Poetry USA, Left Curve, Poetry Flash and Oakland Out Loud. In the 1980s, he was associated with the San Francisco Cloud House circle of poets. He also represented the United States at the World Poetry Festival in Caracas, Venezuela, in 2010.

Curl been an editor of the annual international poetry anthologies of the Revolutionary Poets Brigade (Kallatumba Press) since 2014.

=== Translation and Indigenous American literature ===
Curl’s work on Indigenous American literature includes translations of poetry from pre-Columbian cultures. His study of Indigenous languages included Navajo. In Ancient American Poets (2005), he translated poetry associated with three traditions: Nahuatl poems attributed to the Aztec ruler Nezahualcoyotl, the Maya Songs of Dzitbalché, attributed to Ah Bam, and Quechua poetry associated with Pachacuti of the Inca world. The book includes historical and biographical material on the poets and their cultural contexts.

A revised edition, titled Ancient American Poets: Maya, Inca and Aztec Poets, was published by Homeward Press in 2021. Curl’s translations of poems attributed to Pachacuti were also used in the libretto for Ancient, a 2009 composition by Cuban-American composer Tania León, written for two sopranos and chamber ensemble.

=== Memoir and fiction ===
Curl's memoir Memories of Drop City: The First Hippie Commune of the 1960s and the Summer of Love narrates his experiences at Drop City and examines the communal movement of the 1960s.

Curl has also written fiction. His novels include The Co-op Conspiracy (2014), which focuses on cooperative and political themes, and The Outlaws of Maroon (2019).

== Bibliography ==
=== History ===
- History of Work Cooperation in America (1980)
- History of Collectivity in the San Francisco Bay Area (1982)
- For All the People: Uncovering the Hidden History of Cooperation, Cooperative Movements, and Communalism in America (2009, 2012)

=== Memoir ===
- Memories of Drop City: The First Hippie Commune and the Summer of Love (2007)

=== Novels ===
- The Co-Op Conspiracy (2014)
- The Outlaws of Maroon (2019)

=== Translation ===
- Ancient American Poets (2005)

=== Poetry ===
- Change/Tears (1967)
- Commu 1 (1971)
- Insurrection/Resurrection (1975)
- Spring Ritual (1978)
- Ride the Wind (1979)
- Cosmic Athletics (1980)
- Tidal News (1982)
- Decade: the 1990s (1987)
- Columbus in the Bay of Pigs (1991)
- Scorched Birth (2004),
- Revolutionary Alchemy (2012)
- Yoga Sutras of Fidel Castro (2014)
- Rainbow Weather (2022)
- Memory of a Kiss (2025)
- America Beyond the Well (2025)
- Early Warnings (2026)

=== Plays ===
- The Trial of Christopher Columbus (2026)

=== Videos ===
- The Columbus Invasion (1991)
- The Heights of Hungry Coyote (1990)
- Wall Poems (YouTube 2012)
- Nezahualcoyotl, Poet of Ancient Mexico (YouTube 2012)
- Songs of Dzitbalché by Ah Bam (YouTube 2012)
