= The Bite in the Apple =

2013 book by Chrisann Brennan

The Bite in the Apple: A Memoir of My Life with Steve Jobs
- Author: Chrisann Brennan
- Language: English
- Subject: Steve Jobs
- Genre: Memoir
- Publisher: St. Martin's Press
- Publication date: October 29, 2013
- Publication place: United States
- Media type: Print (Hardcover)
- Pages: 320
- ISBN: 9781250038760

The Bite in the Apple: A Memoir of My Life with Steve Jobs is a 2013 book by Chrisann Brennan. She is an American painter. She recounts her volatile relationship with Steve Jobs, beginning when they were in high school and continuing in part while she was an early employee of Apple Inc., before it went public.

She is the mother of Jobs's first child, Lisa Brennan-Jobs, born in 1978. He denied paternity but later developed a relationship with Lisa and acknowledged her as his daughter by giving her his name. The book was released on October 29, 2013.

== See also ==
- List of books and publications related to the hippie subculture
