= Peter Aschwanden =

New Mexican artist

Peter Aschwanden (October 4, 1942 – December 3, 2005) was a New Mexican artist and illustrator whose work was emblematic of the 1960s generation's freewheeling spirit.

== How to Keep Your Volkswagen Alive ==
Aschwanden gained national prominence when under the name Junipero Scopulorum he illustrated a series of auto-repair manuals beginning with the 1969 manual How to Keep Your Volkswagen Alive: A Manual of Step-by-Step Procedures for the Compleat Idiot, written by John Muir. Following Muir's death, additional new material and revisions for subsequent editions have been provided by Tosh Gregg. The independently published book sold about 2 million copies and is now in its 19th edition. A photo of Aschwanden appeared in the book, with the caption reading his pseudonym, "Amanda B. Reckondwith". Aschwanden would also contribute illustrations to Muir's publication, The Velvet Monkeywrench.

== Other works ==
Aschwanden illustrated the sequel to the original How to Keep Your Volkswagen Alive book entitled How to Keep Your Volkswagen Rabbit Alive: A Manual of Step-by-Step Procedures for the Compleat Idiot. This publication was written by Richard Sealey (Muir had died in 1977) and published in May 1980 by John Muir Publications of Santa Fe, New Mexico. He illustrated another automotive manual through John Muir Press, How To Keep Your Honda Alive: A Manual of Step by Step Procedures for the Compleat Idiot, published in 1983. He illustrated The Septic System Owner's Manual: Subterranean Mysteries Revealed in the same trademark style he used in the Volkswagen repair books.

== Death ==
Aschwanden died of cancer on December 3, 2005. He was 63.
