= Leslie Stevens =

American screenwriter (1924–1998)

- Born: Leslie Clark Stevens IV; February 3, 1924; Washington, D.C., U.S.
- Died: April 24, 1998 (aged 74); Los Angeles, California, U.S.
- Occupations: Film, and television director, screenwriter
- Spouses: Ruth Mostoller (m. 1950; div. 1953); Kate Manx (m. 1958; div. 1964); Allyson Ames (m. 1965; div. 1966); Yolanda Kocourek (m. 1968; div. 1984); Shakti Chen (m. 1985)

Leslie Clark Stevens IV (February 3, 1924 – April 24, 1998) was an American producer, writer, and director. He created two United Artists Television series for the ABC network, Stoney Burke (1962–63) and The Outer Limits (1963–1965), as well as Search (1972–73) for NBC. Stevens was the director of the horror film Incubus (1966), which stars William Shatner, and was the second film to use the Esperanto language. He wrote an early work of New Age philosophy, est: The Steersman Handbook (1970).

== Biography ==
Stevens was born in Washington, D.C. His interest in science was sparked when he studied for the United States Naval Academy at the behest of his father, Leslie Clark Stevens III, an admiral in the United States Navy. But the Broadway theater intrigued him more than a military career, and he headed for New York as a fledgling writer. He sold his play The Mechanical Rat, to Orson Welles's Mercury Theatre and ran away from home to join the troupe before being returned home by truant officers.

During World War II, he repudiated family tradition by serving in the United States Army Air Forces, becoming a captain at the age of 20. He attended Yale's Drama Department following the war.

His first play Bullfight starring Hurd Hatfield opened off Broadway in 1954. It was followed by The Champagne Complex the following year. His play The Lovers (1956), starring Joanne Woodward, was later filmed as The War Lord (1965). He wrote the Broadway comedy The Marriage-Go-Round (1956), which he adapted to the screen, and produced, as a starring vehicle for Susan Hayward, which was released in 1961. He wrote the screenplay for the film The Left Handed Gun (1958) directed by Arthur Penn and starring Paul Newman. Other films which Stevens produced, and directed and wrote included Hero's Island (1962) starring James Mason, and Private Property (1960) starring Corey Allen, Warren Oates and his then-wife Kate Manx. He also directed the feature film Incubus (1966), which was filmed entirely in the constructed language Esperanto.

Through Daystar Productions, Stevens created the television series Stoney Burke, followed by The Outer Limits which he supervised as executive producer and wrote or directed a handful of episodes, including the pilot The Galaxy Being in which Stevens supplied the voice of the extraterrestrial. His longest-lasting relationship was film composer Dominic Frontiere, who served many years working with Daystar Productions as production executive.

Stevens was writer, director and executive producer of the pilot film and major episodes of It Takes a Thief and McCloud and wrote and produced installments for the series The Invisible Man and Buck Rogers in the 25th Century (which he co-developed with Glen A. Larson). He also produced the first-season Tony Franciosa episodes of The Name of the Game and the short-lived 1972–73 NBC science fiction series Search. Although only credited as supervising producer of "Saga of a Star-World" (the 1978 pilot episode of the Larson-produced Battlestar Galactica), director Alan J. Levi has alleged that "Stevens wrote the original script. Leslie was one of my best friends. I do know that Leslie had told me at one time way before he ever got into the script that he had this great idea for a script that he was going to take to Glen Larson and talk about."

Stevens coined the term "bottle show" for an episode made in very little time at very little cost, "as in pulling an episode right out of a bottle like a genie".

Stevens also wrote for the revival show of The Outer Limits between 1996 and 1997.

Stevens's contributions to the New Age Movement, and its relationships to The Outer Limits are discussed in the book Taoism for Dummies (John Wiley and Sons Canada, 2013).

== Personal life ==
Stevens married Ruth Mostoller, Kate Manx, Allyson Ames (who also married Ralph Levitz, Harry Samuel Rothschild, and John Morris Green), Yolanda Kocourek, and Shakti Chen. Stevens died from complications of an emergency angioplasty in 1998 in Los Angeles, California at the age of 74.

== Quotes ==
There is nothing wrong with being a hack writer. I would point with pride to the inspired hacking of Shakespeare, Michelangelo—you can go through a big list.
As a playwright, I achieved the rank of night clerk in a hotel at 22, night-ward attendant in a New York psychiatric hospital at 25 and the exalted status of copy boy for Time magazine at 28. These jobs paid my room rent while I was writing plays.

== See also ==
- Nightmare (1998 The Outer Limits)

== Works ==
- Stevens, Leslie Clark (1971). est: The Steersman Handbook. Bantam Books.
