= Cathy Cassidy =

English author (born 1962)

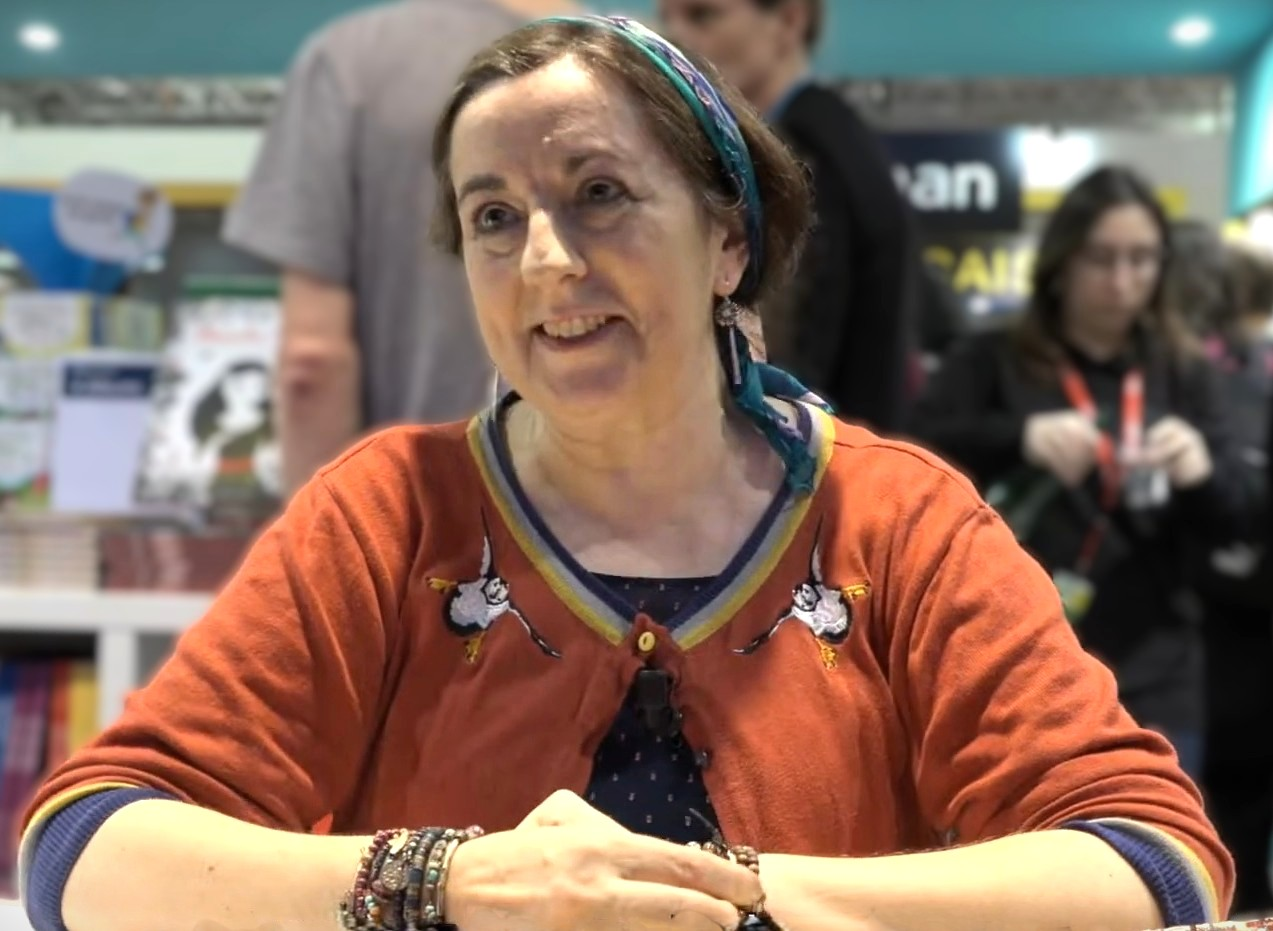
- Cassidy in 2019
- Born: 13 June 1962 (age 63) Coventry, Warwickshire, England
- Occupation: Author
- Language: English
- Genre: Young adult fiction

Cathy Cassidy (born 13 June 1962) is an English author of young adult fiction.

== Early life and career ==
Cassidy was born in Coventry, Warwickshire. She was a student at Liverpool Polytechnic (now Liverpool John Moores University), where she studied illustration. She has written over 30 novels as well as novellas, e-books and non-fiction. As is common in young people's literature, many of her novels are written as series, such as the Daizy Star books for younger readers, and the Chocolate Box Girls for a relatively older audience. Cassidy made all the illustrations for the Daizy Star series herself, including the front covers. She also spent 12 years as the agony aunt for Shout, a magazine for teenage girls, and has taught art at local primary schools.

== Personal life ==
For a number of years Cassidy lived near New Galloway in Scotland where she started writing her novels, but later returned to England. She currently lives on The Wirral, Merseyside, with her husband Liam. The couple have two children, Calum and Caitlin. Cassidy has been a vegetarian for over 35 years and was a vegan for eight. Her lurcher, Kelpie, inspired the dog Legg-It in her first book, Dizzy.

== Awards and honors ==
Cassidy won the 2007 Scottish Children's Book Award (12-16) for her book Scarlett. She was nominated three times for The Book People's Queen of Teen award, winning in 2010, as voted for by fans. Her other nominations were in its inaugural year in 2008 (when Cassidy lost to Louise Rennison), and in 2012 (when Cassidy was runner-up to Maureen Johnson). Other Queen of Teen award recipients include Sarah Webb and Sarra Manning.

== Bibliography ==
- Daizy Star series:
1. Shine on, Daizy Star (2009)
2. Daizy Star and the Pink Guitar (2010)
3. Strike a Pose, Daizy Star (2011)
4. Oh La La! Daizy Star (2012)

- Chocolate Box Girls series:
1. Cherry Crush (2010)
2. Marshmallow Skye (2011)
3. Summer's Dream (2012)
4. Coco Caramel (2013)
5. Sweet Honey (2014)
6. Fortune Cookie (2015)
7. The Chocolate Box Secrets (2015)
8. Bittersweet (2013)
9. Chocolates and Flowers (2014)
10. Hopes and Dreams (2014)
11. Moon and Stars (2014)
12. Life is Sweet (2015)

- Lost and Found series:
1. Love from Lexie (2017)
2. Sami's Silver Lining (2018)
3. Sasha's Secret (2019)
4. Forever Phoenix (2020)

- Stand-alone novels:
1. Dizzy (2004)
2. Indigo Blue (2005)
3. Driftwood (2005)
4. Scarlett (2006)
5. Sundae Girl (2007)
6. Lucky Star (2007)
7. GingerSnaps (2008)
8. Angel Cake (2009)
9. Looking-Glass Girl (2015)
10. The Broken Heart Club (2016)

- Omnibus:
1. Daizy Star and the Pink Guitar / Strike a Pose Daizy Star / Shine on Daizy Star / Her Evil Twin / This Totally Bites (2011) (with Mimi McCoy)
2. Chocolate Box Girls Collection (2015)

- Collections:
1. Our City (2008) (with John Fardell and Vivian French)

- Novellas:
1. Ice Cream and Dreams (2008)
2. Snowflakes and Wishes (2014)

- Non fiction:
1. The Cathy Cassidy Dreams and Doodles Daybook (2008)
2. Letters to Cathy (2009)
