= David Werner =

Health writer and Associate Professor (born 1934)

David B. Werner (born 26 August, 1934) is author of the book Donde No Hay Doctor (Where There is No Doctor), co-founder and co-director of HealthWrights (based in Palo Alto, California) and Adjunct Associate Professor at Boston University School of Public Health, Department of International Health.

== Career ==
A biologist and educator by training, Werner has worked for many years in rural health, community health, village health care, community-based rehabilitation, and child-to-child health initiatives in the Third World, especially Mexico.

For several decades Werner served as facilitator and adviser to Project Piaxtla, a villager-run program which contributed to the early conceptualization and evolution of primary health care. It was located in Ajoya, San Ignacio, Sinaloa but moved to nearby Coyotitan in 2000. Out of Piaxtla grew PROJIMO, a community based rehabilitation program Organized and run by Disabled Youth of Western Mexico, still located in Coyotitan.

Werner has worked in more than 50 countries, mostly developing countries, facilitating workshops, training programs, and approaches to "health education for change." He has been a consultant for UNICEF, WHO, the Peace Corps, UNDP, and UN-ESCAP and various state and federal governments ranging from Mexico to India and Iran. He has received awards and/or fellowships from the World Health Organization, the American Pediatric Association, the American Medical Writers Association, Guggenheim, and the MacArthur Foundation, among others. Werner is a founding member of the International People's Health Council. Werner has also been active in the Planning and Analytic Group for the People's Health Movement, which was launched at the People's Health Assembly, Bangladesh, 2000.

In the last several years he has facilitated community based rehabilitation workshops that focus on assistive equipment made by participants, family members and disabled children.

Werner has illustrated and authored or co-authored several handbooks on topics including basic healthcare, innovative solutions with limited resources, and assistive technology including Where There is No Doctor, Helping Health Workers Learn, Disabled Village Children, Nothing About Us Without Us, Developing Innovative Technologies For, By and With Disabled Persons and Questioning the Solution: The Politics of Primary Health Care and Child Survival.

In 1975 Werner co-founded the Hesperian Foundation, which publishes Where There Is No Doctor and other books on community-based healthcare.

Werner resigned from the organization in 1993 after board members voted for his dismissal following allegations that he had sexually abused teenaged Mexican boys in his care. Werner denied the allegations of abuse, and stated that "extensive investigations by the Hesperian Foundation and by the Palo Alto Police Department ...... [had] turned up nothing." No legal charges were laid against him; the police investigation was affected by the fact that the alleged victims did not live in the US.

Werner subsequently founded another health organization, Healthwrights.
