= John Muir (engineer) =

American aerospace engineer (1918–1977)

John Muir (1918–1977) was a structural engineer who worked for National Advisory Committee for Aeronautics (NACA), who "dropped out," 1960s-style, to become a writer and long-haired car mechanic with a garage in Taos, New Mexico, specializing in maintenance and repair of Volkswagens. He was a distant relative of the naturalist John Muir.

== How to Keep Your Volkswagen Alive ==
In 1969, Muir collaborated with the artist Peter Aschwanden to create the definitive manual for Volkswagen owners, titled How to Keep Your Volkswagen Alive; A Manual of Step-By-Step Procedures for the Compleat Idiot. Entirely hand-lettered with intricate hand-drawn illustrations, Muir's self-published edition sold more than two million copies to become one of the most successful self-published books in history. Its wry subtitle was possibly inspired by the Compleat Angler (1653) by Izaak Walton, and certainly preceded (and perhaps inspired) the "for Dummies" books from IDG Publishing and the Complete Idiot's Guides from Dorling Kindersley. The most recent edition, the 19th (2001), with updated material by Tosh Gregg and Aschwanden remains widely available.

First published at the end of the 1960s, this book is an example of the hippies' do-it-yourself culture.

Muir's second book, published in 1973, The Velvet Monkeywrench, was an ambitious attempt to, as Muir put it, "lay out this structure, the bones of a completely new establishment," a proposal that included detailed plans for the replacement of the United States of America with the Republic of North America. The book remains available from Ocean Tree Books.

== Death ==
Muir died in November 1977 of a brain tumor, just short of his 59th birthday. In 1999, John Muir Publications was sold to Avalon Travel Publishing, with publishing rights to How to Keep ... going to Avalon.
