= The Book People =

British bookseller 1988–2022

- Industry: Retail; Book sales
- Founded: 26 August 1988; 38 years ago
- Founders: Ted and Nicola Smart
- Defunct: 2 March 2022
- Products: Books

The Book People Ltd was a UK online bookseller founded in 1988. The company went into administration in 2019 and was formally dissolved in 2022.

== History ==
The Book People started business in 1988, initially in the Guildford, Surrey area. It expanded rapidly, and by 1990 the company had 140 distributors around the country. A mail-order catalogue was followed by an online store in 1998. In 2002 the company opened offices in Haydock, Merseyside and, with part funding by the Welsh Government, a customer service centre and warehouse in Bangor.

In 2007, The Book People won the Direct to Consumer Bookselling Company of the Year Award at the Bookseller Retail Awards. The company's founder Ted Smart received the Random House Group Award for Outstanding Contribution to Bookselling.

A management buy-out of the company took place in 2014, with support from Endless LLP, a UK-based equity investor. By February 2016 the company was employing over 600 staff.

On 17 December 2019, the BBC reported that The Book People had gone into administration. PricewaterhouseCoopers (PwC) were appointed administrators, with the company continuing to trade while Endless LLP looked for a buyer. In August 2020 the company name was changed to TBP Realisations Limited. No buyer was ultimately found, and the company was formally dissolved in March 2022.

== Business activities ==
The Book People ordered titles in bulk directly from publishers and suppliers, forgoing the right of return.

In conjunction with Scholastic the company hosted online bookshops for Channel 4's TV Book Club, CITV's Bookaboo, and the Big Book Babble programme. Between 2008 and 2014 it hosted a biennial Queen of Teen award for authors of teen fiction. Winners were Louise Rennison (2008), Cathy Cassidy (2010), Maureen Johnson (2012) and Juno Dawson (2014).
