= Puffin Books =

Children's book publisher, an imprint of Penguin Books

- Parent company: Penguin Young Readers Group (Penguin Random House)
- Founded: 2 April 1940; 86 years ago
- Country of origin: United Kingdom
- Headquarters location: One Embassy Gardens, 8 Viaduct Gardens, London SW11 7BW, United Kingdom.
- Key people: Francesca Dow (managing director)
- Publication types: Books
- No. of employees: 50
- Official website: www.puffin.co.uk

Puffin Books is a longstanding children's imprint of the British publishers Penguin Books. Since the 1960s, it has been among the largest publishers of children's books in the UK and much of the English-speaking world. The imprint now belongs to Penguin Random House, a subsidiary of the German media conglomerate Bertelsmann.

== History ==
Four years after Penguin Books had been founded by Allen Lane, the idea for Puffin Books was hatched in 1939, when Noel Carrington, at the time an editor for Country Life books, met him and proposed a series of children's non-fiction picture books, inspired by the brightly coloured lithographed books mass-produced at the time for Soviet children. Lane saw the potential, and the first of the picture book series were published the following year. The name "Puffin" was a natural companion to the existing "Penguin" and "Pelican" books. Many continued to be reprinted right into the 1970s. A fiction list soon followed, when Puffin secured the paperback rights to Barbara Euphan Todd's 1936 story Worzel Gummidge and brought it out as the first Puffin story book in 1941.

The first Puffin editor, Eleanor Graham, saw the imprint through the 1940s and the struggles with paper rationing, and in the 1950s Puffin made its mark in fantasy with tales such as The Lion, the Witch and the Wardrobe by C. S. Lewis and Charlotte's Web by E. B. White. Some other notable titles whose paperback rights were acquired by Puffin included The Family from One End Street by Eve Garnett, which Puffin published in 1942, the Professor Branestawm books by Norman Hunter (1946), Ballet Shoes by Noel Streatfeild (1949), Carbonel: The King of the Cats by Barbara Sleigh (1955), and The Silver Sword by Ian Serraillier (1960). Many different genres featured in the list, e.g. The Puffin Song Book (PS 100), 1956.

=== 1960s to 1970s ===
In 1961, Kaye Webb became Puffin's second editor, as a boom began in children's publishing, and in a decade the Puffin list grew from 51 titles when she took over to 1,213 in print by 1969. Puffin obtained the paperback rights to many of the best writers of the time, including Philippa Pearce, Rosemary Sutcliff, William Mayne, Alan Garner and Antonia Forest, all-time classics including Mary Poppins, Dr Dolittle and The Hobbit, and originals such as Stig of the Dump by Clive King. The books were promoted with flair through the Puffin Club, started by Kaye Webb in 1967 with the promise to Allen Lane that "It will make children into book readers". Though by 1987, it had become uneconomical and evolved into the schools-only Puffin Book Club, at its height the club had 200,000 subscribers and held regular Puffin Exhibitions, and its magazine Puffin Post appeared quarterly for many years, resuming publication in January 2009.

Webb set up the Puffin Club partly to address class inequality in children's literacy. It was important to her that membership was affordable, and Puffin subsidised costs for that reason. She and her team replied to every letter that children sent in, in order to create a sense of community.

Colony Holidays (predecessor to ATE Superweeks) ran Children's Literature Summer Camps for members of the Puffin Book Club. Fifty or so children from all over Britain who loved reading would spend a ten-day holiday together, and popular children's authors such as Joan Aiken, Ian Serraillier and Clive King would spend a few days with them. Webb continued as editor until 1979, and the 1970s saw Puffin further advance its position with successes such as Charlie and the Chocolate Factory by Roald Dahl and Watership Down by Richard Adams.

=== Picture Puffins ===
The range of Picture Puffins, introduced in the late 1960s for younger children, also developed rapidly. Eric Carle's The Very Hungry Caterpillar and Janet and Allan Ahlberg's Each Peach Pear Plum became and have remained firm children's favourites, as have Eric Hill's Spot the Dog and Jan Pienkowski's Meg and Mog books from the 1980s.

=== 1980s to 1990s ===
The 1980s saw Puffin taking full advantage of popular culture with film tie-in publishing, forming close links with Disney and other production companies. It was at this time that Steve Jackson and Ian Livingstone introduced the concept of adventure gamebooks to Puffin which grew into the Fighting Fantasy phenomenon. Philippa Dickinson, who had worked for Webb on the Puffin Club, was the editor for the first book, The Warlock of Firetop Mountain.

The 1980s also saw the launch of the Puffin Plus line of young adult fiction, a market earlier catered for by the imprint Peacock Books. In 2010, the young adult line was relaunched as Razorbill.

The 1990s continued to see new writers join Puffin and in the 21st century the brand still shows heroes and heroines familiar to children such as Artemis Fowl, Percy Jackson, Max Gordon, Mildred Hubble and Scarlett, while celebrities such as Kylie Minogue and Madonna have written for Puffin.

=== 2020s ===
In 2023, it was revealed that Puffin had employed sensitivity readers to edit content regarded as objectionable from at least 10 of the classic works of Roald Dahl, making hundreds of changes to Dahl's works to remove words like "fat", "ugly", and "crazy", and references to gender. Phrases such as "boys and girls" became "people" or "children". Puffin explained that these changes were part of the usual editing processes "to ensure that it can continue to be enjoyed by all today." After the revelation of these changes, Puffin was criticised by numerous literary and political figures, including by author Salman Rushdie and Queen Camilla.

Following backlash Puffin announced that they would continue to release the Classic version of Dahl's original works alongside the edited versions, while other publishers of Dahl's works refused to consider the changes at all.

In 2025, to celebrate their 85th anniversary, Puffin released a collection of special editions of various popular books of theirs. Physically, the books are all clothbound, in mostly yellow, with some form of repeating pattern that differs in style and colour from book to book, accompanied by an illustration, often from the original book cover, placed in the centre in black. The book title, author, illustrator, and other text are also written out in black. Each book features a foreword from a contemporary Puffin author or illustrator.

The book in the collections are as follows; The Story of Tracy Beaker by Jacqueline Wilson, with a foreword by Beth Lincoln, Percy Jackson & the Olympians: The Lightning Thief by Rick Riordan, with a foreword by Nazneen Ahmed Pathak, Diary of a Wimpy Kid by Jeff Kinney, with a foreword by Dapo Adeola, Pig-Heart Boy by Malorie Blackman, with a foreword by Adam Kay, The Extremely Embarrassing Life of Lottie Brooks by Katie Kirby, with a foreword by Nadia Shireen, Wonder by R. J. Palacio, with a foreword by Tom Fletcher, Charlotte's Web by E. B. White, with a foreword by Jordan Lees, and Matilda by Roald Dahl, with a foreword by Robin Stevens.

== Puffin Post ==
Puffin Post was a children's books magazine published by Puffin Books, and the magazine of the Puffin Club. It was launched in 1967 by Kaye Webb, editor of Puffin Books. It declined after Webb retired in 1982, but was relaunched in 2009 through the bookseller The Book People as a bi-monthly magazine. The magazine was discontinued again with the November 2012 issue.

The magazine contained a mix of stories, jokes, interviews, competitions and quizzes, and reader contributions. At its height, it had more than 200,000 readers. Prior to 1982, contributors to the magazine included well-known authors such as Alan Garner, Roald Dahl, Joan Aiken, Leon Garfield and Spike Milligan. After the 2009 re-launch, contributors included Charlie Higson, Cathy Cassidy and Michael Morpurgo.

== See also ==
- UK children's book publishers
- List of largest UK book publishers
