= Graduate Together: America Honors the High School Class of 2020 =

2020 benefit television and livestream event

- Genre: Benefit performance
- Created by: XQ Institute; LeBron James Family Foundation; Entertainment Industry Foundation
- Written by: Jon Macks; Amberia Allen; Marissa Lee; Agathe Panaretos; Sara Schaefer
- Directed by: Hamish Hamilton
- Presented by: LeBron James
- Country of origin: United States
- Original languages: English; Spanish

Production
- Executive producers: Russlynn Ali; Mark Ecko; Brian Gott; LeBron James; Laurene Powell Jobs; Nicole Sexton
- Production location: Virtual
- Running time: 57 minutes
- Production companies: SpringHill Entertainment; Done and Dusted

Original release
- Network: ABC; CBS; Fox; NBC
- Release: May 16, 2020

Graduate Together: America Honors the High School Class of 2020 is an American television special that was simulcasted on the major television networks and online on May 16, 2020. Created by the XQ Institute, the LeBron James Family Foundation, and the Entertainment Industry Foundation, the special was curated by basketball player LeBron James in collaboration with high school students and educators across the United States, including the American Federation of Teachers. The broadcast included a variety of commencement addresses, celebrity performances and inspirational vignettes aimed at high school students, whose graduation ceremonies and proms were cancelled due to the COVID-19 pandemic, due to it causing the closure of most schools worldwide.

== Appearances ==
- LeBron James, host
- Zendaya, actress
- Kevin Hart, actor
- Yara Shahidi, actress
- Kane Brown & Maren Morris, singer
- Timothée Chalamet, actor
- Rodney Robinson, educator
- Megan Rapinoe, athlete
- Bad Bunny, singer
- Jwalt, rapper
- Kumail Nanjiani, actor (via Animal Crossing)
- Olivia Wilde, actor
- Malala Yousafzai, activist
- Lena Waithe, screenwriter
- Julianne Moore, actress
- Shaquille O'Neal, athlete
- Chris Harrison, television personality
- Dave Matthews, musician
- Loren Gray, singer
- The Dolan Twins, internet personalities
- Lana Condor, actress
- Liza Koshy, actress
- Pharrell Williams, singer
- Barack Obama, 44th President of the United States

=== Students ===
Name	School	Location	Role
Priscilla Arceo	Santa Ana High School	Orange County, California	
Justin "Jwalt" Walton	Oakland School for the Arts	Oakland, California	
Ervin Odom	Akron Early College High School	Akron, Ohio	
Shelbie Rash	Skyline High School	Mesa, Arizona	
Jordan Lewis	Washington High School	Phoenix, Arizona	
Halah Berglin	Williams Field High School	Gilbert, Arizona	
Kayla Diaz	Franklin High School		
Johnny Corte	Saguaro High School	Scottsdale, Arizona	
Mason Whitaker	Ironwood Ridge High School	Oro Valley, Arizona	
Parker Fowler	Greenway High School	Phoenix, Arizona	
Morgann Kelly	Desert Vista High School	Phoenix, Arizona	
Lauren Grimm	Thunderbird High School	Phoenix, Arizona	
Caleb Fearing	Mojave High School	North Las Vegas, Nevada	
Christian Johnson	Ron Brown College Preparatory High School	Washington, D.C.	
Morgan Schragger	Hopewell Valley Central High School	Pennington, New Jersey	Introducing H.E.R.
Sydney Guine	Los Angeles County High School for the Arts	Los Angeles, California	Introducing H.E.R.
Eliza Andrus	Ocean Township High School	Oakhurst, New Jersey	Introducing the Graduation Medley by Henry, Jonah, and Ben Platt
Ian Coursey	Our Lady of Good Counsel High School	Olney, Maryland	Introducing the Graduation Medley by Henry, Jonah, and Ben Platt
Emily Liang	Oakland High School	Oakland, California	Introducing YBN Cordae
Jordan Orion	Early College High School	Killeen, Texas	Introducing YBN Cordae
Aniyah Fisher	Kenwood Academy High School	Chicago, Illinois	Introducing the commencement by Barack Obama

== Performances ==
Artist(s)	Song(s)
Students of the Class of 2020	"Star-Spangled Banner"
Dua Lipa	"Break My Heart"
Ben Platt; Henry Platt; Jonah Platt	Graduation Medley "Memories" / "Graduation (Friends Forever)" "In My Life" "See You Again" "Good Riddance (Time of Your Life)"
Alicia Keys	"Underdog"
Chika; Brandan "Bmike" Odums	"Crown"
H.E.R.	"Sometimes"
YBN Cordae	"Broke as F**k"
Jonas Brothers; Karol G	"X"

== Broadcast ==
The special was simulcasted on May 16, 2020, at 8pm EST on the major U.S. broadcast television networks ABC, CBS, Fox, and NBC, except PBS due to flex programming on member stations over most of their schedules and broadcast times for network shows may vary. It was also simulcasted on television networks California Music Channel and The CW, on Spanish-language network Univision, and on cable networks CNN, Fox Business, Fox News, Freeform, and MSNBC. It was also available for streaming in platforms such as ABC News Live, Associated Press, Bleacher Report, Complex Networks, Facebook, FoxNow, Hulu, Instagram, NBC News Now, NowThis News, PeopleTV, The Roku Channel, Roland Martin Unfiltered, Reuters, SiriusXM, Snapchat, TikTok, USO, The Washington Post, and YouTube.

=== Viewership ===
==== United States ====
Network	Viewers (million)
ABC	2.233
NBC	2.203
MSNBC	2.003
CNN	1.879
CBS	1.836
FNC	0.977
Fox	0.659
The CW	0.367
Freeform	0.211

Broadcast network

Cable network

Total Viewership = 14.674
