= List of people from Homs =

The following is a list of notable people from Homs and ancient Emesa.

== Ancient ==
see the Royal family of Emesa

- Papinian (142-212), Jurist
- Alexander Severus (c. 208-235), Roman emperor
- Anicetus, Pope, 154-167
- Cassius Longinus (c. 213-273), rhetorician and philosophical critic
- Drusilla, Princess of Mauretania
- Elagabalus (c. 204-222), Emperor of the Roman Empire
- Fronto of Emesa (3rd century), rhetorician
- Gaius Julius Alexio (d. 78), Prince and Roman Client Priest King of Emesa
- Heliodorus of Emesa, Hellenistic author of Aethiopica
- Iamblichus (2nd century), Syrian Greek novelist
- Iamblichus (c. 31 BC), phylarch
- Iotapa (b. c. 20 BC - date of death unknown), Emesani princess
- Iotapa (lived in 1st century), daughter of Iotapa
- Julia Urania (lived in 1st century), queen of Mauretania Province
- Julia Domna (c. 160-217), Roman empress
- Julia Mamaea (1st century), princess
- Julia Maesa (before 160-c. 224), patron god of Emesa
- Julia Avita Mamaea (after 180-235), daughter of Julia Maesa
- Julia Soaemias (180-222), noblewoman
- Julius Agrippa (2nd century), nobleman
- Julius Alexander (d. c. 190), prince
- Julius Bassianus (d. 217), high priest of sun temple
- Publius Septimius Geta (189-211), Roman co-emperor
- Saint Elian, Christian saint
- Severus Alexander (c. 208 - 235), Roman Emperor
- Sohaemus of Armenia (2nd century), Emesene Prince and Aristocrat
- Sohaemus of Emesa (d. 73), Roman client king of Emesa
- Tiberius Julius Balbillus (second half of the 2nd century - first half of the 3rd century), Emesene Arab Aristocrat

== Medieval ==
- Dik al-Jinn (777-849), Arabic poet during the Abbasid Caliphate

== Modern ==
- Fawaz Akhras (b. 1946), cardiologist
- Bassma Al Jandaly (b. 1977), journalist and cousin of Malek Jandali, Mona E. Simpson, and Steve Jobs.
- Nasib Arida (1887-1946), poet
- Asma al-Assad (b. 1975), wife of former Syrian President Bashar al-Assad
- Hashim Atassi (1875-1960), former President of Syria
- Nureddin al-Atassi (1929-1992), former President of Syria
- Khaled al-Atassi (1837-1908), religious scholar and poet
- Lu'ay al-Atassi (1926-2003), former President of Syria
- Rouwaida Attieh (b. 1982), vocalist
- Wiam Simav Bedirxan, documentary filmmaker
- Malek Jandali (b. 1972), composer, pianist and cousin of Bassma Al Jandaly, Mona E. Simpson, and Steve Jobs.
- Mona Jandali, a.k.a. Mona E. Simpson (b. 1957), novelist, English professor, sister of Steve Jobs, and cousin of Bassma Al Jandaly and Malek Jandali.
- Riad Jarjour, former General Secretary of Middle East Council of Churches
- Steve Jobs (1955-2011), former CEO of Apple Inc., brother of Mona E. Simpson, and cousin of Bassma Al Jandaly and Malek Jandali.
- Firas Al Khatib (b. 1983), footballer
- Ibrahim al-Hadid (b. 1956), medical doctor and Ba'ath Party politician
- Jehad Al-Hussain (b. 1984), footballer
- Abdul Baset al-Sarout (1992-2017), footballer turned rebel commander
- Ali Mahmoud Othman (b. 1978), journalist
- Muhammad Tulaimat (b. 1941), painter
- Riyad al-Turk (b. 1930), Communist opposition leader
- George Wassouf (b. 1961), pop singer
- Basel Manadil (b. 1993) (also known as The Hungry Syrian Wanderer), Syrian-Filipino Vlogger.
- Rami Sebei (b. 1984), a Canadian professional wrestler, otherwise known as Sami Zayn whose parents were from Homs

== Families ==
- Atassi (16th century AD-present), once a prominent political and religious Ashraf family in the city
