= Jandali =

Jandali may refer to:

- Jandali language, an Australian language
- Jandali, a Syrian surname; notable people include:
  - Dr. Abdulfattah John Jandali, father of Steve Jobs
  - Abdul Lateef Jandali, reputed birth name of Steve Jobs
  - Bassma Al Jandaly, Emirati journalist
  - Malek Jandali, pianist and composer
  - Mona Simpson Jandali, novelist
  - Lennox Samir Jandali, IT Specialist Systemintegration
