= Reed Jobs =

American venture capitalist

- Born: Reed Paul Jobs; September 22, 1991 (age 35); Palo Alto, California, U.S.
- Education: Stanford University
- Occupation: Venture capitalist
- Years active: 2023–present
- Spouse: Elena Swanson McCallister (m. 2023)
- Children: 1
- Parents: Steve Jobs (father); Laurene Powell Jobs (mother)
- Relatives: Eve Jobs (sister); Lisa Brennan-Jobs (half-sister); Harry Charles (brother-in-law); Mona Simpson (aunt); Malek Jandali (first cousin once removed); Bassma Al Jandaly (first cousin once removed)

Reed Paul Jobs (born September 22, 1991) is an American venture capitalist and founder of the Yosemite Venture Fund. He is the son of Steve Jobs, the co-founder of Apple Inc., and Laurene Powell Jobs.

== Early life ==
Jobs had a summer internship in oncology at Stanford when he was 15. He switched his major to history after his father died from pancreatic cancer in 2011.

== Career ==
Jobs' mother, Laurene Powell Jobs, founded Emerson Collective, a philanthropic venture capital enterprise, in 2011. Jobs served as the managing director for health at Emerson. In 2023, Jobs spun off a new venture capital firm, Yosemite, from Emerson Collective. Yosemite was reported to have over $200 million in assets under management in August 2023. The fund is focused on cancer treatments. Named after the park where Jobs' parents married in 1991, the fund raised money from John Doerr, Memorial Sloan Kettering Cancer Center, The Rockefeller University and M.I.T. Jobs also serves on the President's Advisory Council of Break Through Cancer.
