= Lisa Brennan-Jobs =

American writer (born 1978)

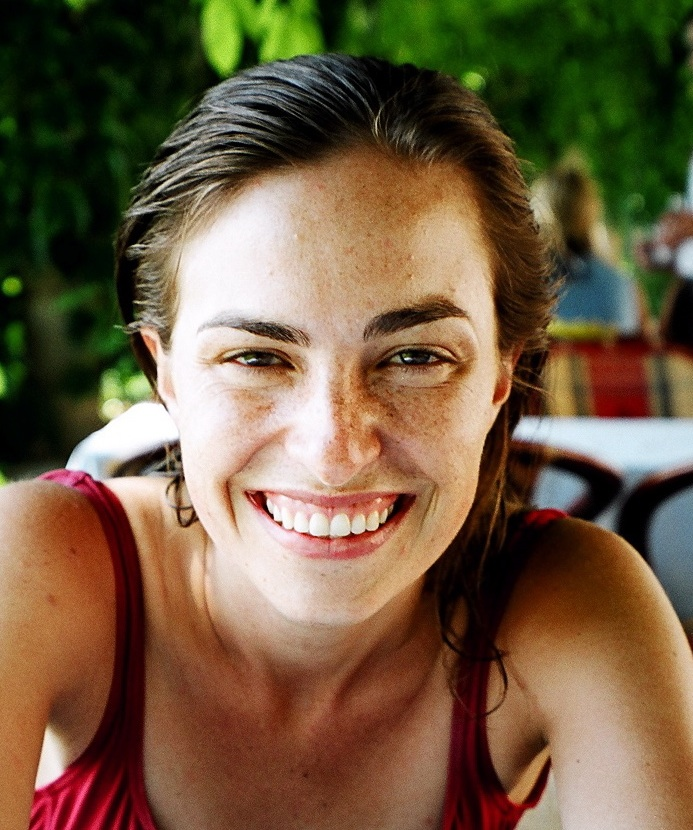
- Brennan-Jobs in 2005
- Born: Lisa Nicole Brennan; May 17, 1978 (age 48); Portland, Oregon, U.S.
- Education: Harvard University (BA)
- Occupation: Writer
- Spouse: Bill
- Children: 1
- Parent(s): Steve Jobs; Chrisann Brennan
- Relatives: Laurene Powell Jobs (stepmother); Reed Jobs (half-brother); Eve Jobs (half-sister); Harry Charles (half-brother-in-law); Mona Simpson (aunt); Malek Jandali (cousin once removed); Bassma Al Jandaly (cousin once removed)

Lisa Nicole Brennan-Jobs (née Brennan; born May 17, 1978) is an American writer. She is the daughter of Apple Inc. co-founder Steve Jobs and Chrisann Brennan.

Jobs initially denied paternity for several years, which led to a legal case and various media reports in the early days of Apple. Lisa and Steve Jobs eventually reconciled, and he accepted his paternity. Brennan-Jobs later worked as a journalist and magazine writer. An early Apple business computer, the Apple Lisa, is named after her, and she has been depicted in a number of biographies and films, including the biopics Pirates of Silicon Valley (1999), Jobs (2013), and Steve Jobs (2015). A fictionalized version of Brennan-Jobs is a major character in her aunt Mona Simpson's novel A Regular Guy.

== Early life ==
Lisa Nicole Brennan was born on May 17, 1978, on Robert Friedland's All One Farm commune outside Portland, Oregon. Her mother, Chrisann Brennan, and her father, Steve Jobs, first met at Homestead High School in Cupertino, California, in 1972 and had an on-and-off relationship for the next five years. In 1977, after Jobs had co-founded Apple Inc., he and Brennan moved into a house with their friend Daniel Kottke near the company's office in Cupertino, where they all worked. It was during this period that Brennan became pregnant with Lisa. Jobs, however, did not assume responsibility for the pregnancy, which led Brennan to end the relationship, leave their shared home, and support herself by cleaning houses.

In 1978, Brennan moved to the All One Farm commune to have the baby. Jobs was not present for the baby's birth and only came up three days later after Robert Friedland, the farm's owner and a friend of Jobs from Reed College, persuaded him to do so. Brennan and Jobs named the baby Lisa. Jobs named the computer project he was working on, the Apple Lisa, after her. Shortly after, Jobs publicly denied that he was the child's father. He claimed that the Apple Lisa was not named for her, and his team had come up with the phrase "Local Integrated System Architecture" as an alternative explanation for the project's name. Decades later, Jobs admitted that "obviously, it was named for my daughter".

== Paternity case and reconciliation ==
After Lisa was born, Jobs publicly denied paternity, which led to a legal case. Even after a DNA paternity test established him as her father, he maintained his position. The resolution of the legal case required him to provide Brennan with $385 per month and to reimburse the state for the money she had received from welfare. After Apple went public and Jobs became a multimillionaire, he increased the payment to $500 a month. Michael Moritz interviewed Jobs, Brennan, and a number of others for the 1982 Time Man of the Year special issue, released on January 3, 1983. In his interview, Jobs questioned the reliability of the paternity test, which had found that the "probability of paternity for Jobs, Steven... is 94.1%". Jobs responded by arguing that "28% of the male population of the United States could be the father". Rather than name him "Man of the Year", as he and many others expected while giving the interviews, the issue was instead titled "Machine of the Year: The Computer Moves In". The thematic change occurred after Moritz heard about Brennan-Jobs as well as Jobs' management style.

Years later, after Jobs left Apple, he acknowledged Lisa and attempted to reconcile with her. Chrisann Brennan wrote that "he apologized many times over for his behavior" to her and Lisa and "said that he never took responsibility when he should have, and that he was sorry". After reconciling, nine-year-old Lisa wanted to change her last name, and Jobs was happy and relieved to agree to it. Jobs legally altered her birth certificate, changing her name from Lisa Brennan to Lisa Brennan-Jobs. Brennan credits the change in Jobs to the influence of Brennan-Jobs' newly found biological aunt, author Mona Simpson, who worked to repair the relationship between Brennan-Jobs and her father.

Despite the reconciliation between Jobs and Lisa their relationship remained difficult. In her autobiography, Lisa recounted many episodes of Jobs failing to be an appropriate parent. He remained mostly distant, cold and made her feel unwanted, and initially refused to pay her college fees. According to Fortune magazine, in his will, Jobs left Lisa a multi-million dollar inheritance.

== Education and career ==
When Brennan-Jobs was living with her mother, she attended The Nueva School and Lick Wilmerding High School. Later, after she had moved in with her father, she attended Palo Alto High School. She enrolled at Harvard University in 1996 and studied overseas for one year at King's College London. While a student at Harvard, she wrote for The Harvard Crimson. She graduated in 2000 and subsequently moved to Manhattan to work as a writer. She has written for The Southwest Review, The Massachusetts Review, The Harvard Advocate, Spiked, Vogue, and O, The Oprah Magazine.

== Publications ==
In 2018, Brennan-Jobs published Small Fry, a memoir detailing her childhood and the complex and sometimes difficult relationship she had with her father.

== In media ==
Brennan-Jobs has been portrayed in several biographies of her father, including Walter Isaacson's 2011 authorized biography Steve Jobs. Mona Simpson's 1996 novel A Regular Guy is a fictionalized account based on the story of Brennan-Jobs and her parents. She has been depicted in three biopic films: Brooke Radding portrayed her in the 1999 TNT TV film Pirates of Silicon Valley, while she is played as a child by Ava Acres, and as an adult by Annika Bertea, in the 2013 film Jobs. In the 2015 film Steve Jobs, directed by Danny Boyle, Brennan-Jobs is portrayed at different ages by Perla Haney-Jardine, Ripley Sobo, and Makenzie Moss. Steve Jobs screenwriter Aaron Sorkin said that he discussed the screenplay with Brennan-Jobs in advance and that she is the "heroine of the film".

== Personal life ==
Brennan-Jobs resides in Brooklyn, New York City, with her husband, Bill, and their son.
