= Arne Duncan =

American politician

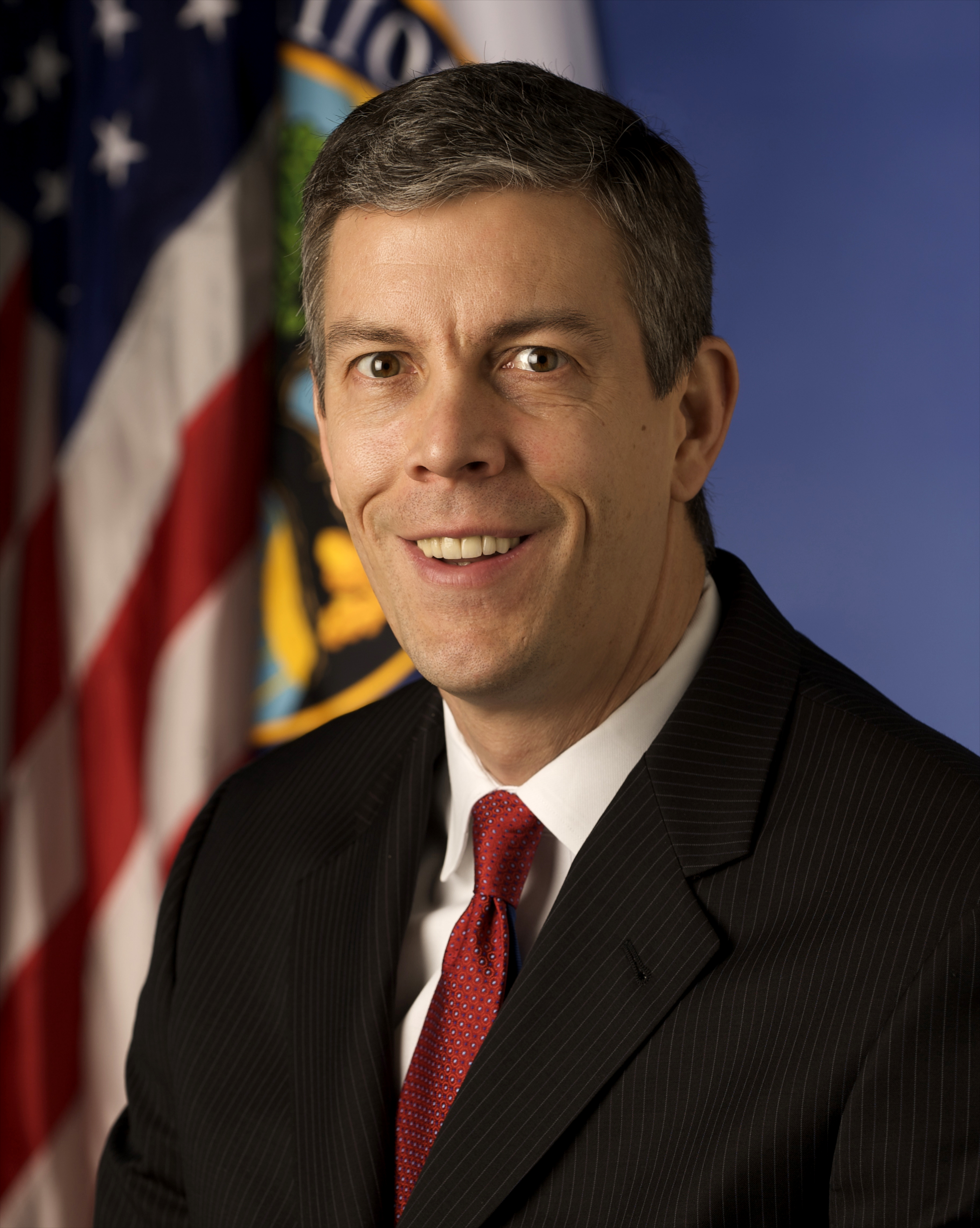
- Official portrait, 2009

9th United States Secretary of Education
- In office January 21, 2009 – January 1, 2016
- President: Barack Obama
- Deputy: Anthony W. Miller; James H. Shelton III; John King Jr. (acting)
- Preceded by: Margaret Spellings
- Succeeded by: John King Jr.

2nd CEO of Chicago Public Schools
- In office June 26, 2001 – January 21, 2009
- Mayor: Richard M. Daley
- Preceded by: Paul Vallas
- Succeeded by: Ron Huberman

Personal details
- Born: Arne Starkey Duncan; November 6, 1964 (age 61) Chicago, Illinois, U.S.
- Party: Democratic
- Spouse: Karen Leanne
- Children: 2
- Education: Harvard University (BA)
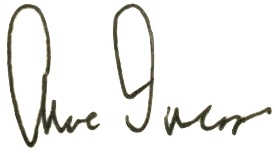
- Signature

Arne Starkey Duncan (born November 6, 1964) is an American educator and former professional basketball player who served as the 9th United States secretary of education from 2009 to 2016 in the cabinet of President Barack Obama. He was Chief Executive Officer of Chicago Public Schools from 2001 to 2009.

Duncan's focus as Secretary of Education was to expand the use of standardized tests, charter schools, and national learning standards like Common Core. He oversaw the Race to the Top program that offered grants and exemptions from the No Child Left Behind Act for states if they implemented these policies. Duncan had bipartisan support when he took office, but his policies became more divisive as teacher's unions objected to the use of testing to evaluate teacher performance and members of the opposing Republican Party accused him of government overreach. He expanded student financial aid and student loan forgiveness, but he was unable to implement his other higher education policies like regulating for-profit colleges or creating a government rating system for the performance of universities. Duncan resigned in 2015 to move back to Chicago with his family. After leaving office, he has worked on anti-violence programs in Chicago.

Before entering politics, Duncan was co-captain of the basketball team at Harvard College, and he then played basketball professionally for the Rhode Island Gulls in the United States and the Eastside Spectres in Australia. He continued playing while in office and used the game to build relationships with Chicago politicians. He won nine out of eleven Hoop It Up three-on-three competitions between 2003 and 2014, participated in the 2012, 2013, 2014, and 2020 NBA All-Star Celebrity Games, and won the USA Basketball three-on-three championship in 2014.

== Early life ==
Arne Starkey Duncan was born in the Chicago neighborhood Hyde Park on November 6, 1964, to Susan and Starkey Duncan. Duncan's father was a professor of psychology at the University of Chicago, and his mother was the founder of a tutoring center that operated out of a church basement in the Kenwood–Oakland neighborhood of South Side, Chicago. As a child, Duncan helped his mother with tutoring and played basketball with the students. The center was threatened by street gangs, and when Duncan was six it was firebombed after the church's pastor refused to let it be used to store weapons. Duncan was an active basketball player as a child.

Duncan attended the University of Chicago Laboratory Schools and later Harvard College, where he studied sociology. When he attended Harvard, he stood at six feet and five inches. He played on Harvard's basketball team beginning in his sophomore year, and he was appointed co-captain in his senior year. He was named a first team Academic All-American. Duncan took a year's leave to prepare for his senior thesis, "The values, aspirations and opportunities of the urban underclass", where he did research by working for his mother's tutoring program.

After leaving Harvard, Duncan played for the Rhode Island Gulls. He also tried out for the Boston Celtics. Duncan then moved to Australia in 1987 to play professional basketball. He played for the Eastside Spectres in the National Basketball League in 1988 and 1989, averaging 24.1 points in 23 games in his first season and 28.6 points in 13 games in his second season. In 1991, he played for Latrobe in the North-West Tasmania League. During his four seasons in Australia, he came to be known by the nickname the Cobra. He also tutored wards of the state while in the country. It was at this time Duncan met his future wife, Karen. They had two children together.

== Chicago Public Schools ==
Duncan moved back to Chicago in 1992. Upon his return, he became director of another South Side tutoring program, the Ariel Education Initiative, where he worked with his sister. The program was funded by financier John Rogers, and together the two eventually founded a charter school out of it. Duncan became Deputy Chief of Staff of the Chicago Public Schools district in 1998, working under Paul Vallas. In this position, he was responsible for managing Chicago's magnet school program.

Basketball was the sport of choice for community figures to play while fraternizing. While working in Chicago, Duncan befriended state senator Barack Obama, who would later become president of the United States, and they got to know each other by playing pick-up games. Their social circle also included John Rogers and Craig Robinson. He played his first Hoop It Up three-on-three competition in 2003, and he won nine of the eleven championships between 2003 and 2014. Three of these were with Rogers and Robinson.

Mayor Richard M. Daley appointed Duncan as the CEO of Chicago Public Schools in 2001. Duncan supported policies with the goals of improving teacher quality and reforming unsuccessful schools. As CEO, Duncan was responsible for selecting which new schools would be opened as part of Daley's Renaissance 2010 initiative. In his early years as CEO of Chicago Public Schools, Duncan responded to failing schools by having them closed. His approach changed in 2006 when he instead ordered that the school's staff must be replaced but the school can stay open.

Duncan's supporters celebrated higher rates of math and reading proficiency in Chicago elementary schools and higher graduation and scholarship rates among high school students. His critics opposed his expansion of charter schools and his attempts to use free market policies to govern school reform. To promote school attendance, Duncan had representatives from Chicago Public Schools make visits to students' homes, and the district offered sports tickets as a reward for attendance. This was followed by a program in September 2008 that paid students up to $4,000 per year for good grades. Duncan supported single-sex education. Duncan threatened to sue the US Department of Education in 2004 after it revoked funding from a Chicago tutoring program, causing it to return the funds. Duncan implemented a policy in 2008 that students with a first language other than English could not be held back a grade for their performance on standardized tests. The same year, he received backlash after he proposed opening a high school that would support gay students called Pride Campus.

== U.S. Secretary of Education ==
=== Nomination ===
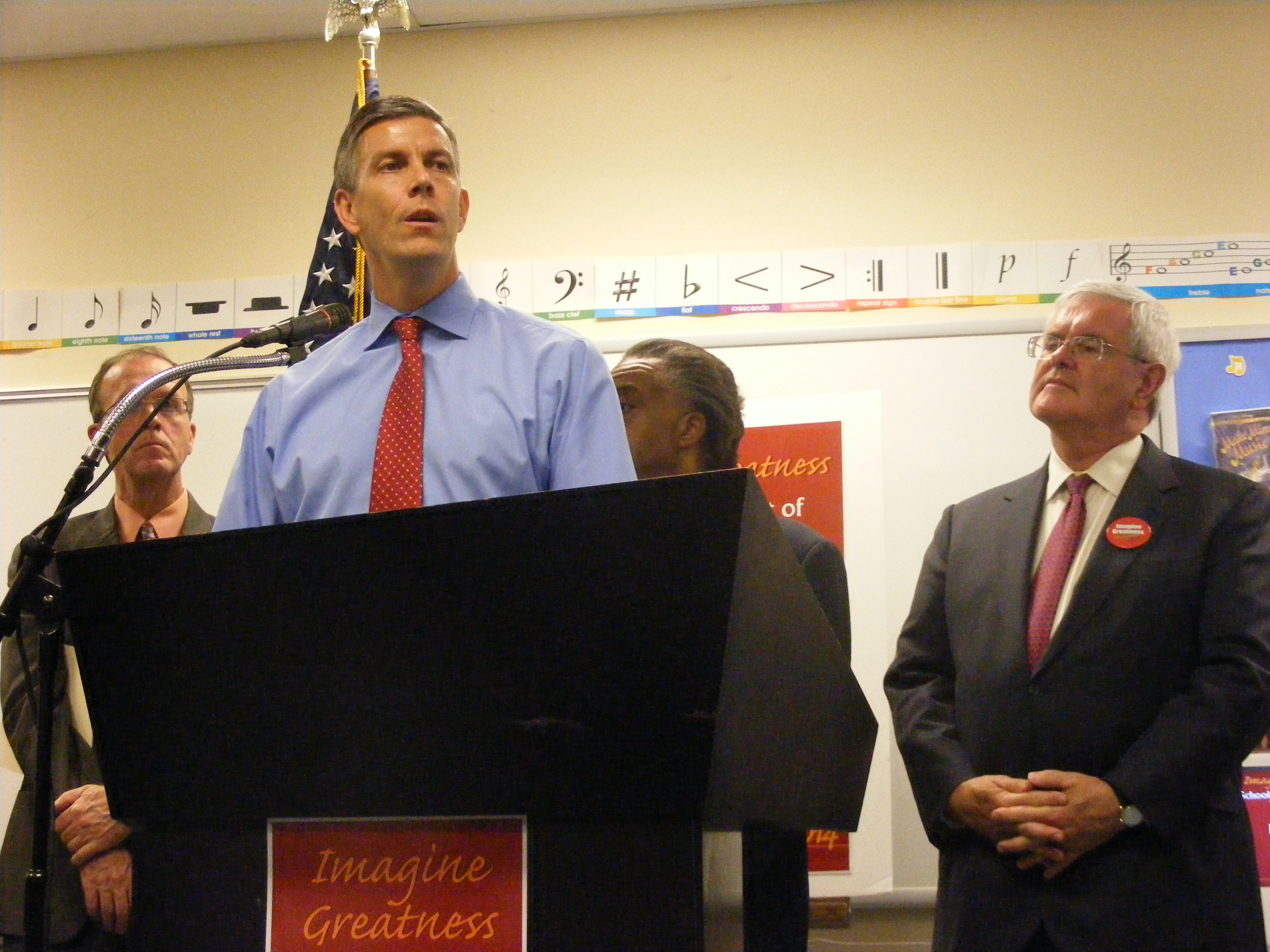
Duncan speaking during an education tour with Newt Gingrich and Al Sharpton in 2009

President-elect Barack Obama announced his nomination of Duncan to be Secretary of Education on December 16, 2008, at a press conference in a school in Chicago. Obama explained that he had chosen Duncan because he wanted someone who was willing to explore alternative theories of education and to make controversial decisions that may upset interest groups.

Those endorsing Duncan's nomination included the Democrats for Education Reform, the National Parent Teacher Association, teachers' union leader Randi Weingarten, and the preceding Secretary of Education from a Republican administration, Margaret Spellings. His supporters touted him as being able to work both with groups that want stricter standards for teachers and with groups that want to increase education spending. The appointment was one of seven that were confirmed unanimously by the Senate on January 20, 2009. He toured the United States in February 2009 to speak with people affected by No Child Left Behind. One of Duncan's earlier critics as Secretary of Education was USA Today writer Greg Toppo, who published a report casting doubt on the idea that Chicago schools had made progress under Duncan.

=== Early tenure ===
Education was not a central political issue in 2009, and the primary concerns in education—reforming the No Child Left Behind program and ensuring schools could remain operational during the Great Recession—had bipartisan support. Because of these factors, Duncan did not have to face significant political attacks early in his tenure and began as a popular member of Obama's cabinet. His appointment was met with wide approval.

Relative to other members of Obama's cabinet, Duncan was highly active in policy during the administration's first year. Once Obama was president, Duncan began participating in Obama's basketball games and morning runs, along with presidential aide Reggie Love. His close working relationship with Obama from their time working together in Chicago allowed him additional influence.

Going into office, Duncan stated that the administration would be implementing its Zero to Five program to fund preschool, programs to improve teacher quality through incentives and performance-based compensation, and to raise academic standards as a means to increase high school graduation rates. He was able to exercise more influence than previous Secretaries of Education. Congress was deadlocked on education policy, allowing Duncan to take more direct control without legislative involvement. This often meant he was working directly with state governments instead of Congress. The enactment of the No Child Left Behind Act years prior gave the position additional power, and the American Recovery and Reinvestment Act of 2009 allocated $100 billion for the Department of Education.

=== Race to the Top and Common Core ===
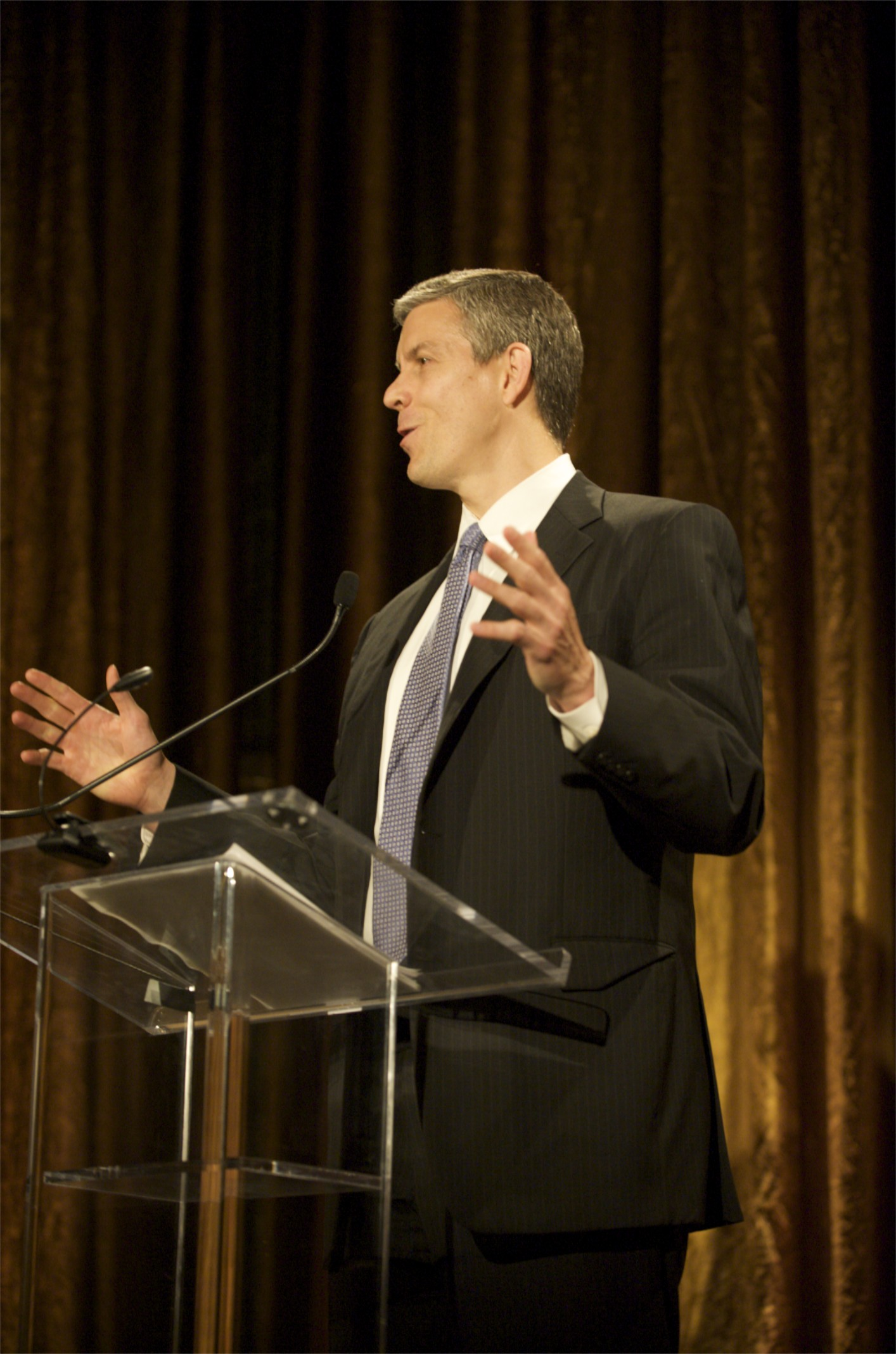
Duncan speaking at the Council of Chief State School Officers Teacher of the Year event in 2010

Duncan's tenure as Secretary of Education was defined by his support for national learning standards and standardized tests. He believed that standardization would allow for objective comparisons and ratings of teachers and schools. He implemented his policies through the Race to the Top program, which provided additional education funding to states on the condition that they implemented certain reforms. It was authorized as part of stimulus spending during the Great Recession, and the program was considered insignificant in its early days as it was given less than one percent of the federal budget's allocations for public schools.

To be eligible for Race to the Top funding, states had to implement national learning standards, eliminate caps on charter schools, and authorize the use student performance as a factor in teacher evaluations. Duncan hoped that testing under national learning standards would allow focus on critical thinking with written responses instead of simple multiple choice questions. The program had other effects on schools, including more focus on test scores, higher academic standards, and more leverage for districts to terminate teachers. In 2011, Race to the Top was amended so it allow states to allowed states to be waived from the requirements of No Child Left Behind. Duncan opposed the No Child Left Behind program, arguing that it caused states to reduce their standards to assure that students would meet them, though he spoke positively of its help in identifying an achievement gap in education and a need for greater accountability. The waiver was accepted by 42 states plus Washington, D.C. and Puerto Rico.

Common Core was the only comprehensive standards system that had been developed when Race to the Top was launched, and it was adopted by 46 states in 2010. Duncan and Obama were two of the most active supporters of Common Core, which politicized its implementation and caused Obama's detractors to oppose it. It became a major point of criticism from the Republican Party, which accused Duncan of governmental overreach. Learning standards had previously been an issue championed by state governments and private groups. Duncan worked with former Florida governor Jeb Bush on education policy and used his name to demonstrate that there were members of the Republican Party who supported Common Core. He went on a campaign for Common Core in 2013 after the Republican National Committee voted to oppose it, including a call on the United States Chamber of Commerce to support Common Core in April. He was criticized and then apologized for a comment in a meeting with state superintendents in November 2013 when he said that Common Core was opposed by "white suburban moms", suggesting that they disliked the tests because it proved their children were not capable of meeting higher standards.

Opposition to standardized tests and Common Core increased as time went on, especially toward the end of Duncan's tenure. His right-wing opponents criticized his policy of heavier federal involvement in education. Opponents of Common Core disliked that it prescribed the teaching of math principles instead of focusing on efficient arithmetic and that its English curriculum increased the priority of non-fiction relative to fiction. Other critics warned that Common Core standards allowed excessive collection of student information, to which Duncan responded that "it doesn't, we're not allowed to, and we won't". He argued that criticism of his policies was not because the ideas were unpopular but because supporters failed to communicate them effectively. He compared the Common Core standards to the Bay of Pigs Invasion by arguing that in both cases the media questioning of the event was unfair, but this was criticized as the invasion is known in public consciousness as lacking transparency.

=== Higher education ===
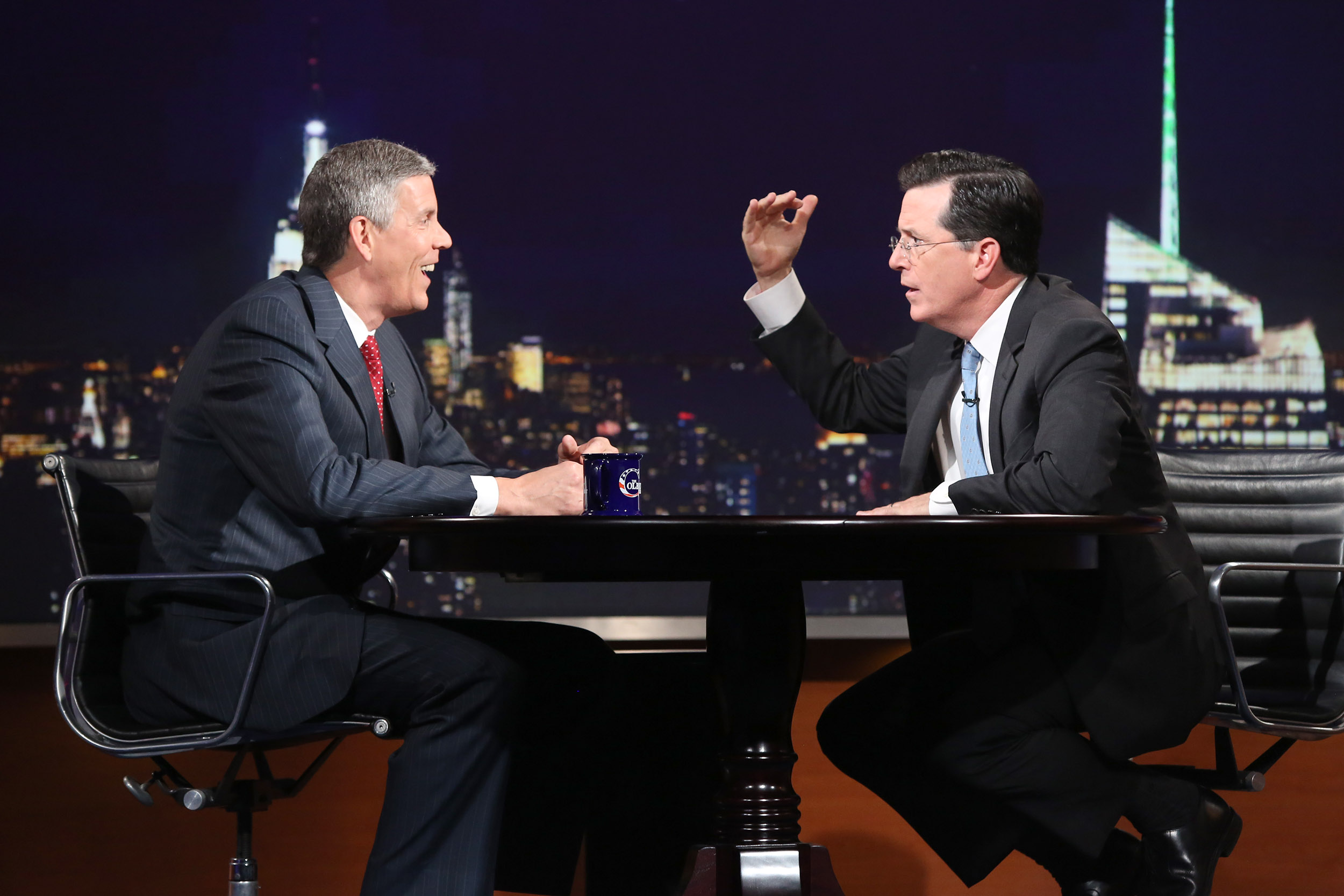
Duncan on The Colbert Report in 2013

Duncan came into conflict with American universities as he pushed for increased regulation. He oversaw the creation of the College Scorecard that compares post-secondary institutions by measuring graduation and then employment rates of their students, but he was unsuccessful in the Obama administration's attempt to create a federal ratings system that would determine federal funding. Duncan also sought to limit federal funding toward for-profit colleges if their graduates could not repay student loans. His 2011 reforms on this issue were struck down in a court ruling, which rejected them for holding for-profit schools to a different standard than other institutions, but a similar regulation was enacted later in Duncan's tenure. He attempted to regulate a high-interest loan program for parents of undergraduate students but stopped when it was opposed by Historically black colleges and universities.

During Duncan's tenure, the Department of Education expanded student financial aid through greater Pell Grants and the American Opportunity Tax Credit. He created a federal program for student loans that capped payments at 10 percent of one's income and allowed forgiveness for most loans after 20 years. Duncan worked with the Obama administration to promote community colleges as an option for post-secondary schooling, and in the following years this led political discourse toward a proposal of making community colleges tuition free.

In college athletics, Duncan believed athletes were taken advantage of and criticized the National Collegiate Athletic Association in 2010 for not doing enough to assure college athletes graduate. Its graduation requirements for schools to remain eligible were raised the following year.

=== Other policies ===
Duncan supported having mayors' offices control school systems, similar to how the schools were run while he was in Chicago, and he supported the expansion of charter schools. He opposed the use of suspension in elementary schools, arguing that suspensions are too harsh and reinforce racial inequality. He expressed concern that schools were not giving enough focus to instruction in foreign language or physical education. Duncan supported increasing the number of days in an academic year. Duncan supported stimulus spending, especially in the context of education spending. He also expanded the School Improvement Grant for low-income schools and backed $1 billion in federal spending for preschools.

On other issues, Duncan spoke in favor of progressive stances on gun control, immigration, and criminal justice, and he expressed support for same-sex marriage before the Obama administration took this stance. He also participated in a Black Lives Matter march while he was Secretary of Education.

=== Basketball ===
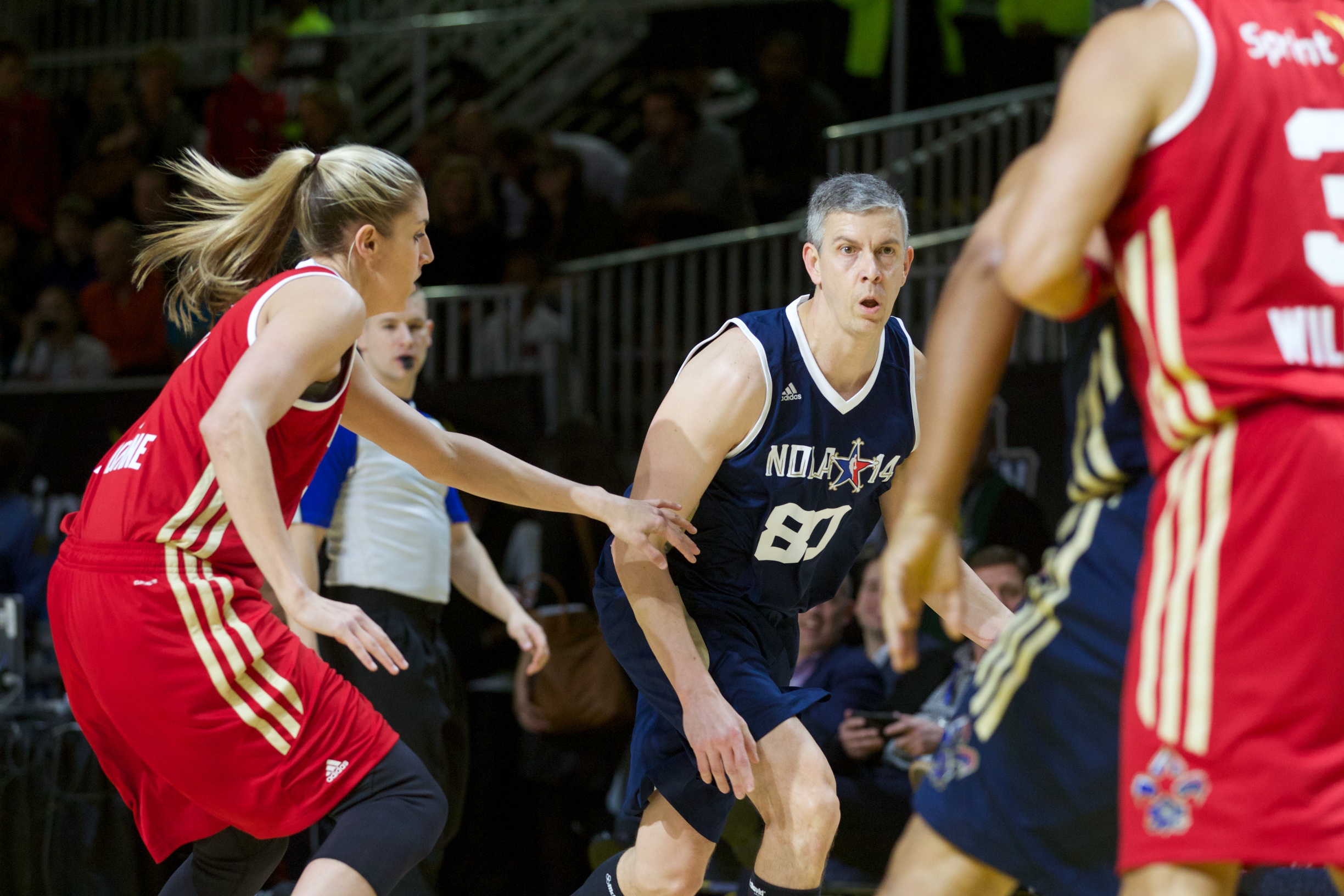
Duncan playing in the 2014 NBA All-Star Celebrity Game

As Secretary of Education, Duncan participated in the 2012, 2013, and 2014 NBA All-Star Celebrity Games. Across the three games, he scored 17, 11, and 20 points, respectively. A viral video of Duncan spread after a pass he made in the 2014 game. Kevin Hart was voted MVP by fans that year, but he declined the award and instead gave it to Duncan. Duncan then won the USA Basketball three-on-three championship in 2014 with a team owned by Rogers, Team Ariel. It consisted of Duncan, Mack Darrow from Princeton University, and Jitim Young and Craig Moore from Northwestern University. The team qualified for the 2014 FIBA 3x3 World Tour in Russia, but Duncan was unable to attend.

=== Departure ===
Duncan was a controversial figure in federal politics by the end of his tenure. His policies saw increasing opposition, especially in his final two years as Secretary of Education. Duncan's focus on testing and the use of student performance to evaluate teachers were strongly opposed by teacher's unions. The National Education Association issued a resolution in 2014 demanding Duncan's resignation, and the American Federation of Teachers demanded Duncan follow an improvement plan of his own similar to the ones that were being prescribed to failing teachers. The left-wing faction of the Democratic Party criticized Duncan as elitist and unqualified to work in education policy. In Duncan's final month as secretary of education, Congress passed the Every Student Succeeds Act, which restricted the Department of Education's ability to set national policies for schools.

Rumors that Duncan would resign began in the summer of 2015 after his family left Washington D.C. and returned to Chicago. His two children began attending the same Chicago private school that he had attended. He announced on October 2, 2015, that he would be stepping down as Secretary of Education in December. John King Jr. was announced as his successor. At the time of his departure, Duncan was one of only two members from Obama's original cabinet to still be serving with him, along with Tom Vilsack, the Secretary of Agriculture.

== Later career ==
Duncan began working with the Emerson Collective in 2016, both with its XQ Institute and with a new office in Chicago. He expressed his belief that helping young adults in the city obtain employment would reduce crime. He also founded gun control initiatives like Chicago CRED and the Scaling Community Violence Intervention for a Safer Chicago program. Following a 2018 school shooting in Texas, Duncan proposed that parents engage in a national boycott of schools until gun control laws were passed.

Duncan opposed the Republican Party's policies in the 2016 presidential election, though he spoke positively of Republican candidates Jeb Bush and John Kasich for their support of Common Core. He opposed the debt-free college policy of Bernie Sanders and Martin O'Malley because he felt it preserved the college system instead of reforming it. He criticized Trump's Secretary of Education, Betsy DeVos, during the first presidency of Donald Trump and said the Trump administration was deliberately restricting education because an educated populace would identify Trump as spreading falsehoods. In 2021, Duncan was one of the few Democrats to endorse Deborah Kerr, his former high school teacher, in the non-partisan race for Superintendent of Public Instruction of Wisconsin.

Duncan released a book in 2018 about his experiences working in education policy titled How Schools Work: An Inside Account of Failure and Success from One of the Nation's Longest-Serving Secretaries of Education. In the book, he criticizes the American education system as one that "runs on lies" and fails to help under-performing students.

Duncan returned to the NBA All-Star Celebrity Game in 2020 as a late entrant.

Duncan was critical of Chicago mayor Lori Lightfoot and expressed interest in running against her in the 2023 Chicago mayoral election. He announced on March 1, 2022, that he would not run for mayor because he wanted to continue working on his youth anti-violence projects. In 2024, Duncan signed an open letter opposing Chicago Mayor Brandon Johnson's ouster of CEO Pedro Martinez.

== Publications ==
- How Schools Work: An Inside Account of Failure and Success From One of the Nation's Longest-Serving Secretaries of Education. Simon & Schuster. 2018. ISBN 978-1-5011-7305-9.

== Works cited ==
- Hayes, William (2010). What's Ahead in Education? An Analysis of the Policies of the Obama Administration. Rowman & Littlefield Education. ISBN 978-1-60709-679-5.
- Hayes, William (2013). Consensus: Education Reform Is Possible. Rowman & Littlefield Education. ISBN 978-1-61048-840-2.
- Shober, Arnold F. (2016). In Common No More: The Politics of the Common Core State Standards. Praeger Publishing. ISBN 978-1-4408-3770-8.
- Wolff, Alexander (2016). The Audacity of Hoop: Basketball and the Age of Obama. Temple University Press. ISBN 978-1-4399-1309-3.

Educational offices
Preceded by Paul Vallas	CEO of Chicago Public Schools; 2001–2009	Succeeded by Ron Huberman
Political offices
Preceded by Margaret Spellings	United States Secretary of Education; 2009–2016	Succeeded by John King Jr.
U.S. order of precedence (ceremonial)
Preceded by Steven Chu as Former U.S. Cabinet Member	Order of precedence of the United States as Former U.S. Cabinet Member	Succeeded by Eric Shinseki as Former U.S. Cabinet Member
