= Laurene Powell Jobs =

American businesswoman (born 1963)

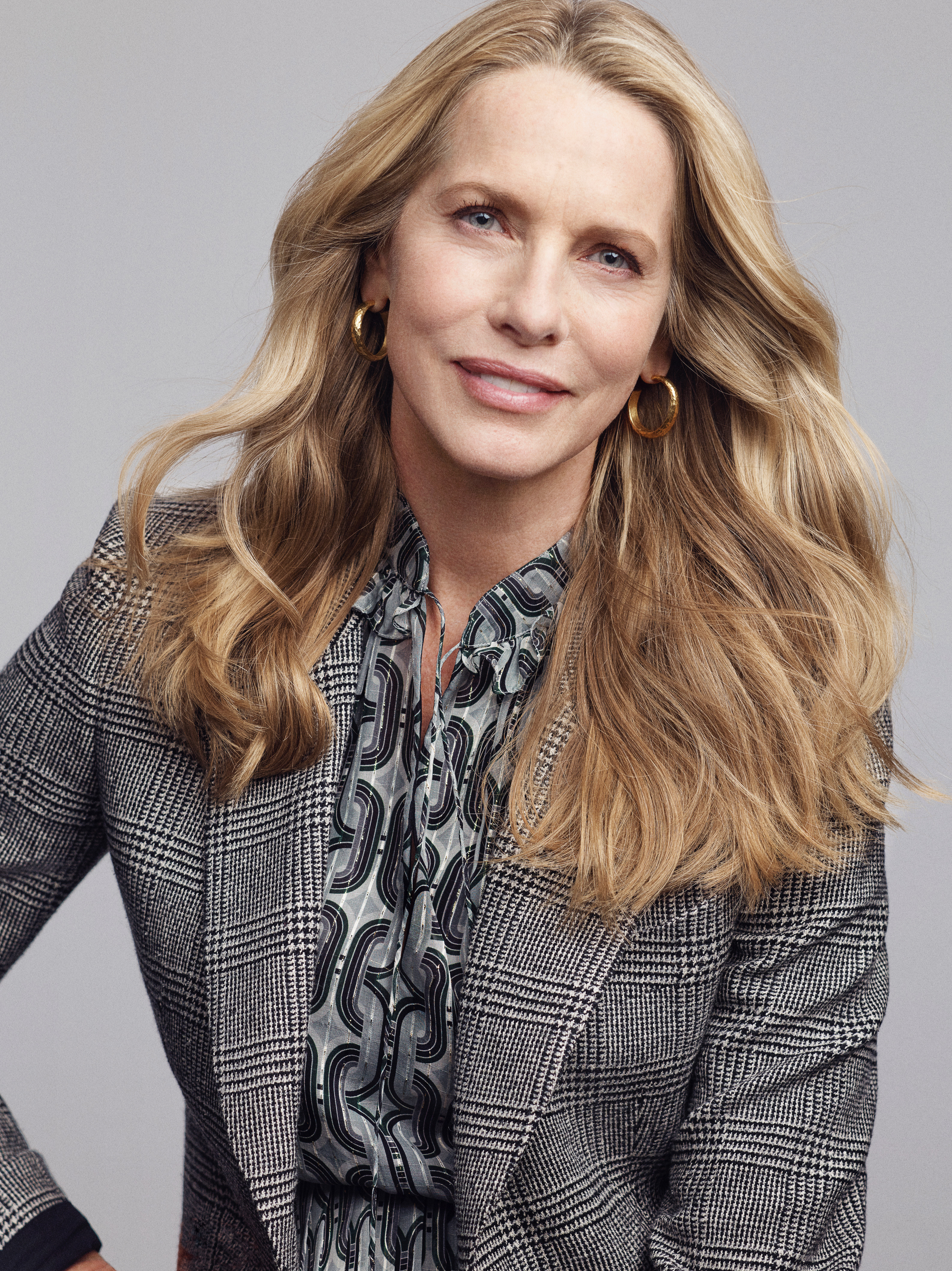
- Jobs in 2025
- Born: Laurene Powell; November 6, 1963 (age 62); West Milford, New Jersey, U.S.
- Education: University of Pennsylvania (BA, BS); Stanford University (MBA)
- Organization: Emerson Collective
- Spouse: Steve Jobs (m. 1991; died 2011)
- Children: 3, including Reed and Eve
- Relatives: Mona Simpson (sister-in-law); Lisa Brennan-Jobs (stepdaughter); Harry Charles (son-in-law)

Laurene Powell Jobs (née Powell; born November 6, 1963) is an American entrepreneur, business executive and philanthropist. She is the founder and president of Emerson Collective, lead investor and chair of The Atlantic and co-founder and chair of XQ Institute. Powell Jobs also sits on the boards of the Ford Foundation, Council on Foreign Relations, Chicago CRED, College Track and Elemental Impact. She was married to Steve Jobs, the co-founder and former chief executive of Apple Inc, for twenty years, before his death in 2011.

== Early life and education ==
Powell Jobs was raised in West Milford, New Jersey. She earned a B.A. in political science from the University of Pennsylvania School of Arts and Sciences and a B.S. degree in economics from the Wharton School of the University of Pennsylvania in 1985. She received her MBA degree from the Stanford Graduate School of Business in 1991.

== Career ==
Before business school, Powell Jobs worked for Merrill Lynch Asset Management and spent three years at Goldman Sachs as a fixed-income trading strategist. In the 1990s, after her MBA, Powell Jobs co-founded Terravera, a natural foods company that sold to retailers throughout Northern California.

In 2011, Powell Jobs founded Emerson Collective, a company that invests in entrepreneurs and innovators working in education and immigration reform, media, journalism and conservation using a combination of venture investing and philanthropy. In an interview with the Financial Times in June 2025, Powell Jobs said the company "invests in entrepreneurs and innovators driven by purpose and a sense of possibility". Through Emerson, Powell Jobs owns The Atlantic.

In 2013, Powell Jobs was an investor in Ozy Media and resigned from the board in 2017.

In 2017, Powell Jobs purchased a 20 percent stake in Monumental Sports & Entertainment (MSE), which owns the NBA's Washington Wizards, NHL's Washington Capitals and Capital One Arena. She was the second-largest shareholder behind chairman Ted Leonsis. In December 2025, MSE announced that Powell Jobs had divested her stake in the company.

As of 2023, she is an investor in California Forever, a company building a planned sustainable city in Solano County, California. The project has purchased over 66,000 acres in Solano County with the goal of bringing good paying jobs, new energy infrastructure, new homes, walkable neighborhoods, parks and cultural venues.

In May 2025, Chiba Institute of Technology conferred an honorary doctorate to Powell Jobs along with Jigme Khesar Namgyel Wangchuck and Reid Hoffman in recognition of their contributions to society.

In March 2025, Daniel Lurie, Mayor of San Francisco, appointed Powell Jobs as co-chair of 'The Partnership for San Francisco' alongside Ruth Porat.

In October 2026, Powell Jobs was appointed to the boards of Skydance and Anonymous Content.

== Philanthropy ==
In 1997, Powell Jobs co-founded College Track, a non-profit organization in East Palo Alto to improve high school graduation, college enrollment, and college graduation rates for students from under-resourced communities.

Of College Track's high school graduates, many of whom are first-generation college students, about 90 percent attend four-year colleges, and 70 percent finish college in six years, whereas the national average for first-generation college students is 24 percent. College Track has facilities in East Palo Alto; Sacramento; San Francisco; Oakland; Watts; Boyle Heights; Crenshaw; New Orleans; Aurora, Colorado; Denver; Prince George's County, Maryland; Washington, D.C., and Baltimore in 2026. "We have a wait list of five cities where we'd like to open up centers," Powell Jobs has said.

In September 2015, Powell Jobs launched a $50 million project to create high schools with new approaches to education. Called XQ: The Super School Project, the initiative aims to inspire teams of educators, students, and community leaders to create and implement new plans for high schools. Efforts include altering school schedules, curriculums and technologies in order to replace the country's century-old high school education model. Funding for XQ comes from Powell Jobs' Emerson Collective. Following an initial $50 million financial contribution, XQ announced an additional contribution, awarding ten schools $10 million each, for a total financial contribution of $100 million. The schools were chosen from approximately 700 submissions nationwide. Powell Jobs' team of advisors is led by Russlynn H. Ali.

Powell Jobs' philanthropy has been described as of limited "transparency and accountability." In 2019, Powell Jobs was designated the "Least Transparent Mega-Giver" by Inside Philanthropy. In an interview with Bloomberg in 2022, Powell Jobs's said her philanthropy operates almost entirely anonymously to give "greater emphasis" to the charities themselves rather than the donors.

In 2021, Powell Jobs announced the creation of a new climate philanthropic organization called the Waverley Street Foundation, with an initial investment of $3.5 billion to be spent over ten years. The foundation focuses on regenerative agriculture, renewable energy and community resiliency.

== Political activity ==
Powell Jobs has made donations to various Democratic politicians over the last twenty years.

In the 2016 U.S. presidential election, Powell Jobs donated $2 million to Hillary Clinton and raised another $4 million for her campaign.

In 2017, it was reported that Powell Jobs provided funding to the political organization ACRONYM.

== Personal life ==
In October 1989, Steve Jobs gave a "View from the Top" lecture at Stanford Business School. Laurene Powell was a new MBA student and started up a conversation with Jobs, who was seated next to her. Laurene joked that she was sitting in the front row because she had won a raffle, and the prize was that he got to take her to dinner. Jobs cancelled his dinner plans and the two had dinner together that night. A year and a half later, on March 18, 1991, they married in a traditional Buddhist wedding ceremony at the Ahwahnee Hotel in Yosemite National Park. Presiding over the wedding was Kōbun Chino Otogawa, a Zen Buddhist monk. She is a devout follower of Zen Buddhism.

Powell Jobs resides in Palo Alto, California. In 2024, it was reported she purchased a residential property in San Francisco worth $70 million. She and Steve Jobs had three children together: son Reed (born September 1991) and daughters Erin (born 1995) and Eve (born 1998). Laurene is also the stepmother of Lisa Brennan-Jobs (born 1978), Steve's daughter from a previous relationship. In 2018, she stated that the book Small Fry by her stepdaughter Lisa Brennan contains false information about Steve Jobs as a father.

In August 2013, The Washington Post reported that Powell Jobs was dating former mayor of the District of Columbia Adrian Fenty. The couple was seen arriving for a state dinner at the White House in August 2016 and was last seen together in July 2025 for the wedding of Powell Jobs's daughter, Eve Jobs. In October 2017, it was reported by The Washington Post that Powell Jobs and Fenty were no longer dating but remained close friends.

In 2023, she was ranked as the 25th-most powerful woman in the world by Forbes.

In 2025, she visited India for Maha Kumbh Mela 2025.

As of July 2025, Powell Jobs was ranked 244th on the Bloomberg Billionaires Index with an estimated net worth of $11.9 billion.

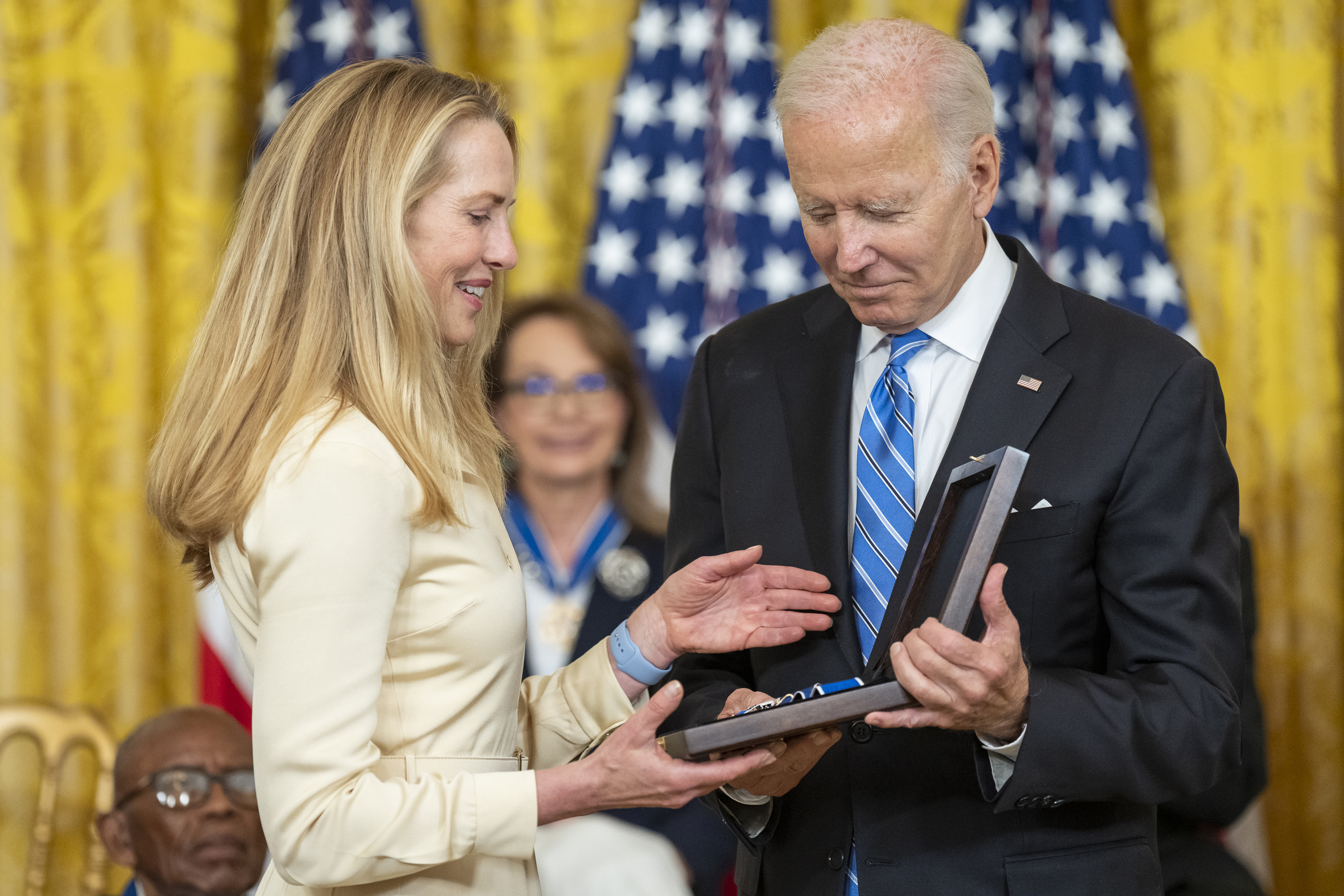
Powell Jobs (left) receiving Medal of Freedom on behalf of Steve Jobs from Joe Biden in July 2022

=== Death of Steve Jobs ===
On October 5, 2011, at the age of 56, Steve Jobs, the chief executive of Apple, died due to complications from a relapse of islet cell neuroendocrine pancreatic cancer. At the time, Powell Jobs inherited the Steven P. Jobs Trust, which as of May 2013 had a 7.3 per cent stake in The Walt Disney Company worth about $12.1 billion, and 38.5 million shares of Apple Inc.

== Honors ==
- Elected to the American Academy of Arts and Sciences for contributions to public affairs and public policy (2018).
- Ernest C. Arbuckle Award from the Stanford Graduate School of Business (2019).
- Gross National Happiness Medal (Kingdom of Bhutan; January 16, 2025).
- Honorary Doctorate, Chiba Institute of Technology, Japan (May 2025).
