= Emerson Collective =

American philanthropic and investment company

Emerson Collective, LLC
- Named after: Ralph Waldo Emerson
- Established: 2011; 15 years ago
- Founder: Laurene Powell Jobs
- Type: Limited Liability Company
- Headquarters: Palo Alto, California, US
- Methods: Advocacy; Venture capital investing; Philanthropy
- President: Laurene Powell Jobs
- Website: emersoncollective.com

Emerson Collective, LLC is an American company founded by Laurene Powell Jobs. The company invests in entrepreneurs and innovators working in education, energy and the environment, immigration, media and journalism. Founded in 2011 in Palo Alto, California, Emerson Collective is considered to be one of the leading groups engaged in both venture capital investing and philanthropy. In 2017, the company acquired a majority interest in The Atlantic magazine.

== History ==
Emerson Collective was founded in 2011 by Laurene Powell Jobs in Palo Alto, California. Named after transcendentalist writer and The Atlantic co-founder, Ralph Waldo Emerson, the company says its mission is "working to create a world that honors talent, expands opportunity and ensures the conditions for human flourishing."

Powell Jobs has said the decision to found the company grew from insights she gained working with students through College Track, a nonprofit organization founded in 1997 to improve high school graduation, college enrollment and college graduation rates for students from under-resourced communities. In a Q&A on the company’s website she wrote: "Working with the students, families and staff of College Track enriched my understanding of our country and the many systems within it. Education is not an isolated or siloed domain. It connects to a broader set of systems that touch people’s lives, including immigration, health, environment and economic opportunities. The understanding of just how interconnected these issues are was fundamental to the creation of Emerson Collective."

== Areas of work ==
=== Education ===
In 2015, Powell Jobs and Emerson Collective's managing director of education, Russlynn Ali, launched the affiliate XQ Institute, a nonprofit dedicated to rethinking American public high school so students are prepared for success in college, career and life.The company provided $100 million to the charity which has been awarded to 10 selected schools across the US.

In 2015, Emerson Collective became the lead investor in education technology company Amplify.

In 2023, a documentary called 'The First Class', chronicled the founding class of Crosstown High, an XQ school in Memphis, Tennessee.

=== Immigration reform ===
When Emerson Collective was established, grants and investments largely focused on the education sector. As Powell Jobs began learning more about the challenges plaguing immigrant students, particularly those whose undocumented status made it difficult to attend college, Emerson Collective broadened its portfolio to include immigration reform and advocacy.

Emerson Collective was a strong advocate of the creation of President Barack Obama's Deferred Action for Childhood Arrivals (DACA) program and have continued to push for permanent legislation to provide "Dreamers" with a path to citizenship. In October 2016, Powell Jobs wrote an article titled "Immigrants Fuel Innovation. Let's Not Waste Their Potential" for WIRED.

In 2017 and 2018, Emerson Collective supported the immigration-focused work of the artist JR, and helped bring Alejandro González Iñárritu's Academy Award-winning, virtual reality experience Carne Y Arena to Washington, D.C.

=== Energy and environment ===
Emerson Collective is a funder of Elemental Impact, a nonprofit organization which invests in technologies that seek to create economic and environmental impact in communities. According to its 2024 annual report, Elemental Impact has a portfolio of 160 companies that have generated $11.5 billion in additional funding and created over 17,000 jobs.

In 2021, Emerson Collective invested in Commonwealth Fusion Systems, a company developing fusion energy. The company has made several other investments in energy and clean technology companies including Antora Energy, Zap Energy, Twelve and Lilac Solutions.

=== Media and journalism ===
In July 2017, Emerson acquired a majority stake in The Atlantic from David Bradley. At the time of the acquisition, it was announced that Emerson would acquire full control and ownership of the company within “three to five” years.

In January 2020, Emerson Collective and Powell Jobs partnered with Davis Guggenheim to launch Concordia Studio, a company that develops, produces and finances scripted and non-scripted productions. It has produced a number of films including Still: A Michael J. Fox Movie (2024), Deaf President Now! (2025), Boys State (2020) and Girls State (2024).

== Operations ==
Emerson Collective operates as a limited liability company and focuses its activity on venture capital investment and philanthropy, It also provides fellowships and internship programs. and is the family office of its founder. The company hosts an annual event called "Demo Day" to showcase companies and founders who are pursuing innovative solutions across its areas of work.

=== Venture capital ===
Emerson Collective provides investment to companies across all stages. According to its website, it predominantly invests in companies in energy and environment, artificial intelligence, digital health, fintech, education, work and media.

=== Philanthropy ===
Emerson Collective supports and funds non-profit organizations through multi-year grants and donations. The company’s philanthropic giving is typically anonymous, something Powell Jobs explained in an interview with Bloomberg in 2022, saying: "Often what happens with philanthropy is there's a lot of power that accrues to the giver and not as much to the organizations and the leaders that are doing the work on the ground. I wanted to make sure that the leaders and the incredible workers who were doing day-to-day work to improve the lives of other humans were actually in the front and we were in the back."

=== Partner organizations ===
Emerson Collective has established a number of independent partner organizations that operate as separate entities, including:

- XQ Institute - a nonprofit organization founded in 2015 focusing on transforming high schools in the US.
- Chicago CRED - a nonprofit organization founded in 2016 focusing on preventing gun violence in Chicago, led by former United States Secretary of Education, Arne Duncan.
- E Pluribus Unum - a nonprofit organization founded in 2018 focusing on community programs and relations in the American south.
- Waverley Street Foundation - a nonprofit founded in 2021 with $3.5 billion in funds to be invested over 10 years in community programs focusing on regenerative agriculture, renewable energy and climate resiliency.
- Yosemite - a cancer-focused venture fund led by Reed Jobs that spun out from Emerson in 2023.

== Notable investments ==
- In 2015, Emerson Collective became the lead investor in education technology company Amplify.
- On September 1, 2016, Emerson Collective invested in series A funding for Axios Media, a news website focusing on business, technology, politics and media trends. The company exited the investment in 2022 when Axios was sold to Cox Enterprises.
- On July 28, 2017, Emerson Collective became the majority owner of The Atlantic, purchasing the majority stake from Atlantic Media's David Bradley. The outlets owned by Emerson Collective include The Atlantic magazine and its digital properties along with its standout events line, AtlanticLIVE and its consulting division, Atlantic 57.
- In 2017, Emerson Collective invested, along with the Stripes Group, in Gimlet Media, the podcasting start-up behind the shows StartUp, Reply All and Homecoming.
- In 2019, Emerson Collective led a round of funding for Boom Supersonic, an aerospace company that aims to make supersonic commercial flight a realization again.
- In 2021, Emerson Collective invested in Commonwealth Fusion Systems, an American fusion energy company.
- In 2024, Emerson Collective led a $60 million series B round for Midi Health.
- In 2025, Emerson Collective co-led a $10 million seed extension round for Teal Health to help the company launch the Teal Wand, an at-home cervical cancer self-collection device.
- In April 2025, Emerson Collective invested in io Products, which was co-founded by Jony Ive and acquired by OpenAI, to create a new artificial intelligence hardware device.
