= Eve Jobs =

American fashion model (born 1998)

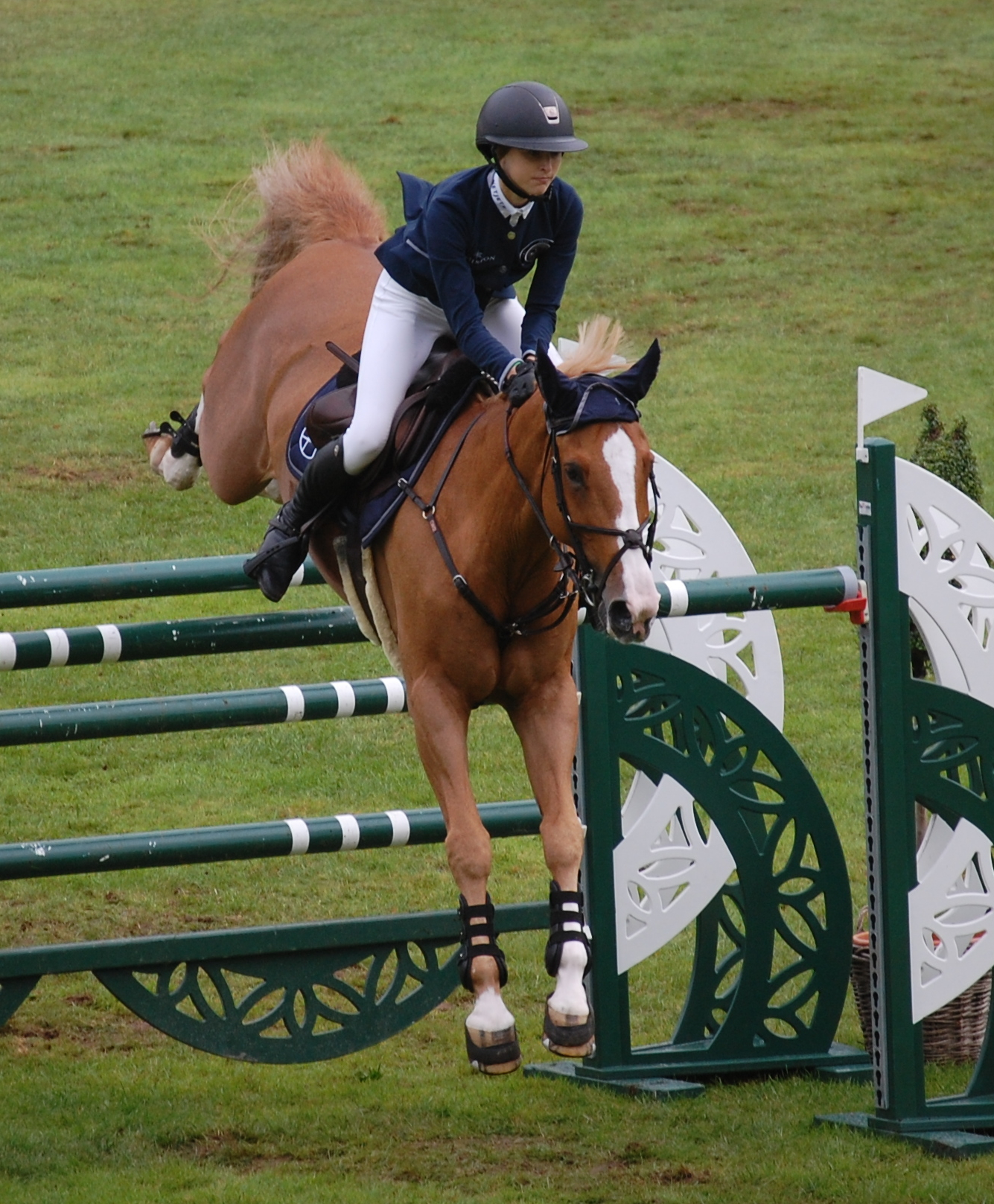
- Jobs show jumping in Hamburg, Germany, 2021
- Born: July 9, 1998 (age 28); Palo Alto, California, U.S.
- Education: Stanford University (BA)
- Occupation: Model
- Spouse: Harry Charles (m. 2025)
- Parent(s): Steve Jobs; Laurene Powell Jobs
- Relatives: Reed Jobs (brother); Lisa Brennan-Jobs (half-sister); Peter Charles (father-in-law); Mona Simpson (aunt); Malek Jandali (first cousin once removed); Bassma Al Jandaly (first cousin once removed)
- Modeling information
- Height: 5 ft 9 in (175 cm)
- Hair color: Brunette
- Eye color: Hazel
- Agency: DNA Models (New York)

Eve Jobs (born July 9, 1998) is an American fashion model. She is the daughter of the late Apple Inc. co-founder Steve Jobs and businesswoman Laurene Powell Jobs.

== Early life ==
Named after Eve from the book of Genesis, Jobs is the youngest daughter of Steve Jobs (his eldest being Lisa Brennan-Jobs from his first partner Chrisann Brennan). She also has two older siblings: brother Reed, and sister Erin. She is of Syrian ancestry through her father, who was adopted by an American couple. Her biological paternal grandmother was an American woman of Swiss and German descent from Wisconsin. (Note: Further details can be found in the Early life of Steve Jobs) Her paternal aunt, Mona Simpson, is a novelist and English professor. After her father died in 2011, her mother became one of the richest women in the world.

Jobs attended Upper Echelon Academy in Wellington, Florida, and was an accomplished equestrian; in 2019, she was ranked as the world's fifth-best rider under 25. She graduated from Stanford University in 2021, then moved to New York.

== Career ==
In March 2022, Jobs signed with DNA Model Management after making her runway debut with the French fashion label Coperni and appearing in a Glossier holiday campaign with actress Sydney Sweeney. She has since appeared in a solo Vogue editorial and on the October 2022 cover of Vogue Japan. In fall 2022, she starred in a solo Louis Vuitton campaign.

== Personal life ==
Jobs married British show jumping competitor Harry Charles in Oxfordshire, England in July 2025.
