= Emessa (album) =

Emessa (Homs)

Studio album by Malek Jandali
- Released: May 25, 2012
- Recorded: New York City and Moscow; July 11–16, 2010
- Genres: Classical, World
- Length: 59:10
- Label: Soul b Music
- Producer: Malek Jandali

Emessa (Homs) is an album of original music for piano and orchestra composed and orchestrated by Malek Jandali and recorded with The Russian Philharmonic Orchestra with Seregey Kondrashev as a conductor. The music was inspired by and dedicated to the people of Syria in their struggle for freedom and human rights. The release of “Freedom Qashoush Symphony” was accompanied by a tour of the United States, Europe and the Middle East.

== Track listing ==
All tracks are written by Malek Jandali.

Emessa - Homs
No.	Title	Length
1.	"Caravan"	3:42
2.	"Zinzana"	5:23
3.	"Mari"	6:29
4.	"Emessa"	5:28
5.	"Mawal"	5:30
6.	"Nasheed"	5:04
7.	"Valse Hijaz"	4:23
8.	"Freedom"	6:08
9.	"Amal"	7:39
10.	"Syrian Pulse"	4:20
11.	"Salam"	5:04

== Personnel ==
- Malek Jandali – composer, producer, publisher; piano, orchestration and arrangement
- Sergey Kondrashev – conductor
- the Russian Philharmonic Orchestra
- Roger Seibel – mastering engineer and sound master
