= Pianos for Peace =

US non-profit arts organization

- Founded: 2015
- Type: Nonprofit organization
- Location: Atlanta, Georgia, United States
- Region served: Metro Atlanta
- Founder and CEO: Malek Jandali
- Website: pianosforpeace.org

Pianos for Peace is a nonprofit organization founded by composer and pianist Malek Jandali. It is a 501(c)(3) public charity based in Atlanta. Pianos for Peace mission is to build peace through music and education.

The annual Pianos for Peace Festival takes place in Atlanta over a two-week period where painted pianos are placed in public spaces and parks of the city for anyone to play. Afterward, the pianos are donated to schools, community centers, hospitals, nursing homes and other organizations in need. Pianos for Peace volunteer artists contribute to year-round outreach programs that reach various under-resourced communities throughout Metro Atlanta.

In 2019, Pianos for Peace displayed two of their painted pianos for the Music for Peace celebration in Ashland, Oregon, organized by Anima Mundi Productions. After the event, one will be donated to a public school, while the other one will be displayed in a public building in the city of Phoenix.

== Gallery ==
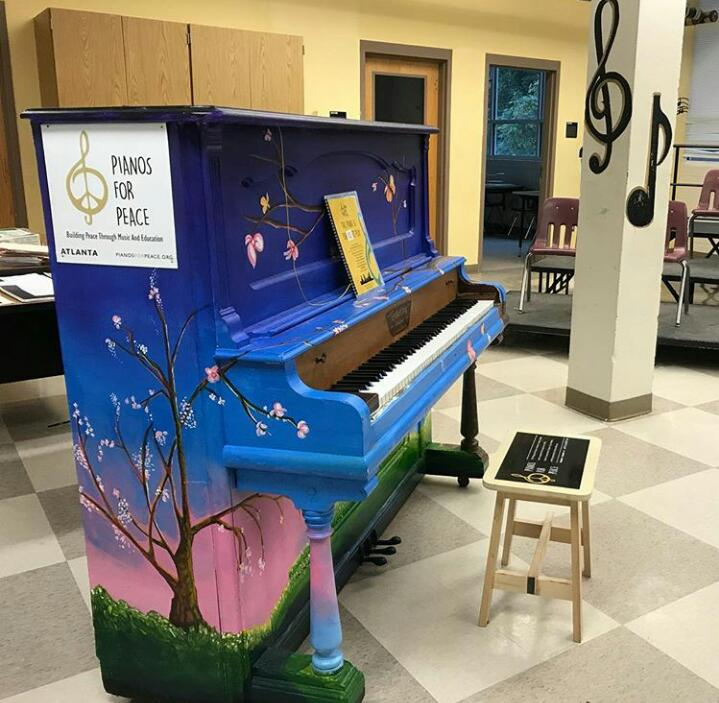

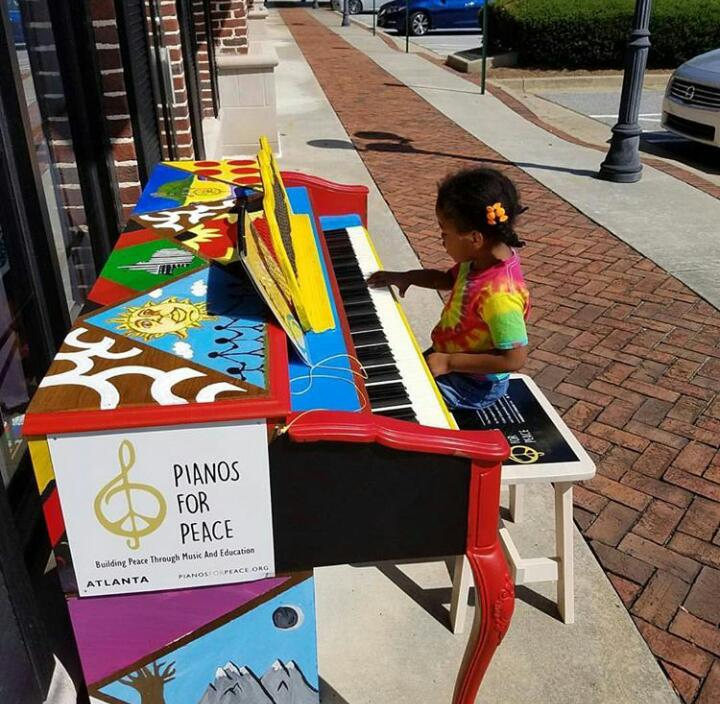

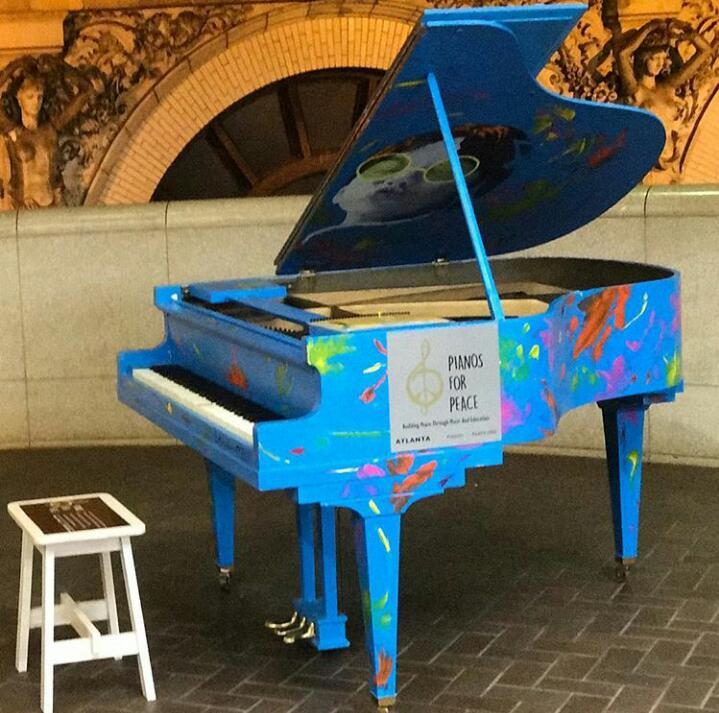

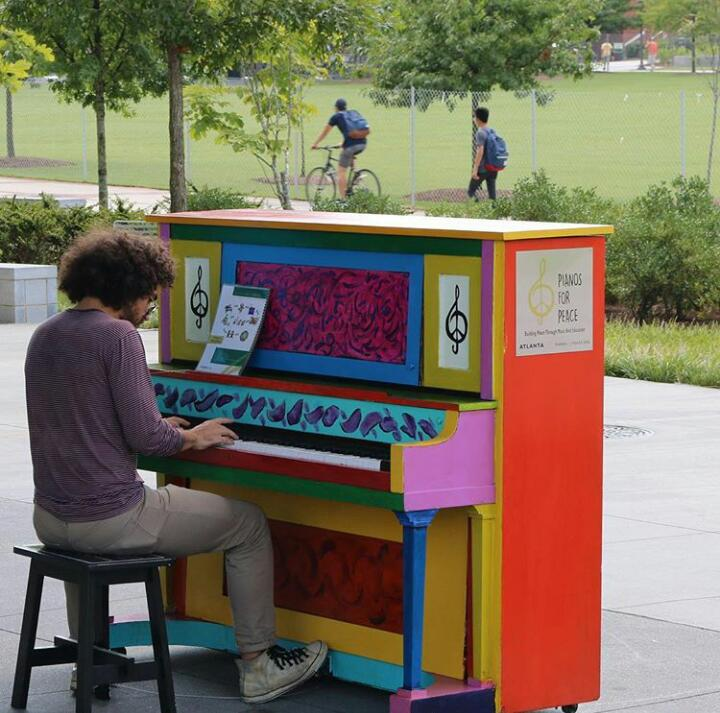
