= All One Farm =

1970s commune in McMinnville, Oregon

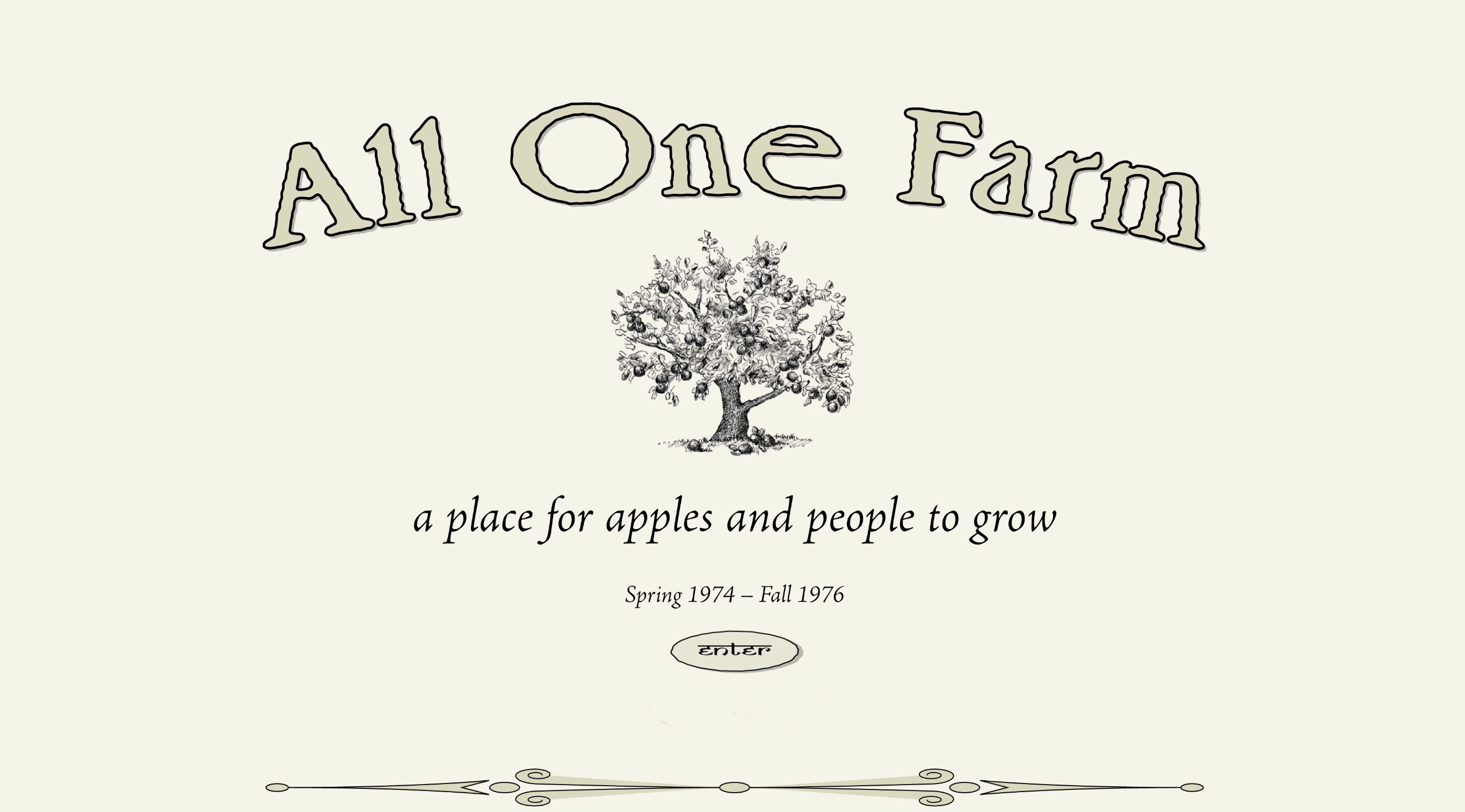
A note by the residents of All One Farm in remembrance of their experiences and in recognition of the farm's founders

All One Farm was a 1970s commune in McMinnville, Oregon, United States, that played a pivotal role in Steve Jobs' early life. It is credited as the inspiration for the naming of Apple Inc. and has ties to Atari, Robert Friedland, and the birth of Jobs’ first child, Lisa Brennan-Jobs.

Rooted in the counterculture movement, All One Farm emphasized spirituality, communal living, and alternative thinking. The commune attracted individuals interested in Eastern philosophy, meditation, and psychedelics, which were believed to expand consciousness.

== How Apple Inc. got its name ==
The name "Apple" was inspired by Steve Jobs’ time working in the apple orchard at All One Farm, where he followed a fruitarian diet and admired the simplicity and purity of apples. During a car ride back from the All One Farm, Jobs suggested the name "Apple Computer" while brainstorming with Steve Wozniak on potential company names.

Jobs favored the name "Apple" because it felt fresh and friendly – a stark contrast to the technical-sounding names of other computer companies at the time. He wanted a name that was "fun, spirited, and not intimidating." He also liked that Apple would come before Atari in the phone book, giving them an edge over their former employer. Although Wozniak initially hesitated due to concerns about Apple Records (The Beatles’ label), they ultimately settled on the name.

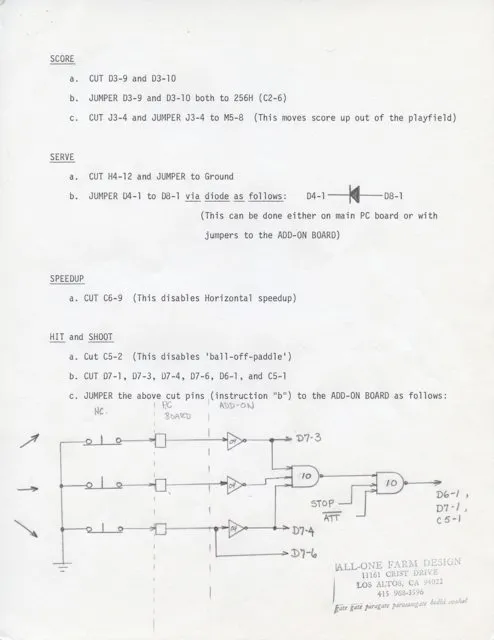
A memo written by Steve Jobs at Atari with the All One Farm stamp at the bottom

=== All One Farm in Atari's records ===
While attending the All One Farm, Jobs worked at Atari along with Steve Wozniak. The farm's influence on Jobs is reflected in official Atari records. A manuscript on Atari letterhead, which was later auctioned at Sotheby’s, featured hand-drawn circuit diagrams by Jobs, along with an "All One Farm" stamp and Jobs’ signature. This item highlights the connection between his time at All One Farm and his work at Atari.

== Robert Friedland ==
The All One Farm was managed by Robert Friedland, a charismatic future billionaire mining mogul, who introduced Jobs to persuasive leadership, Zen Buddhism, and psychedelics—influences that contributed to Jobs' renowned “Reality Distortion Field." Though Jobs later distanced himself from Friedland, the lessons from All One Farm remained foundational to his career.
