= Echoes from Ugarit =

Studio album by Malek Jandali
- Released: May 25, 2009 (DDD) (US); June 27, 2009 (Stereo) (SYR)
- Recorded: Moscow Radio House; July 11–16, 2008
- Genres: Classical music, World music, Film music
- Length: 45:21
- Labels: Soul b Music; US-QRC (DDD); US-QRC 2009 (Stereo); US-QRC 08-00001
- Producer: Malek Jandali

Professional ratings
Review scores
Source	Rating
AllMusic	5/5 stars

The piece “Echoes from Ugarit”, whose name bears the album, is the oldest music notation in the world that was discovered in the city of Ugarit, Ras Shamra - Syria, on cuneiform tablets dating back to the fourth century BC. Malik Jandali, the Syrian pianist, was the first musician in the world to deal with this notation, add rhythm and harmony to it, and play it on the piano accompanied by international orchestras. The album “Echoes from Ugarit” is the outcome of his attempts to mix oriental maqams in an academic manner with classical music. He recorded it in Moscow with the Russian Philharmonic Orchestra.

== Track listing ==
All tracks are written by Malek Jandali.

Echoes from Ugarit
No.	Title	Length
1.	"Andalus"	5:39
2.	"Sulaima"	7:59
3.	"Piano Dream"	3:11
4.	"Leil"	5:58
5.	"Yafa"	7:15
6.	"Echoes from Ugarit"	4:53
7.	"Eid"	4:36
8.	"Arabesque"	5:04

== Personnel ==
- Malek Jandali – composer, producer, publisher; piano, orchestration and arrangement
- Sergey Kondrashev – conductor of the Russian Philharmonic Orchestra.
- Pavel Lavrenenkov – recording engineer and sound engineer.
- John Rodd – track mixing, mixing engineer, audio engineer .
- Dave Lawrence – audio engineer and editor.
- Roger Seibel – mastering engineer and sound master.

=== Charts ===
Chart	Rank
Dubai Weekly	6
Music Maker Chart	4
SYR Chart	1
World Record Retailer	14
