= Small Fry (memoir) =

2018 memoir by Lisa Brennan-Jobs, daughter of Steve Jobs

Small Fry: A Memoir
- First edition cover
- Author: Lisa Brennan-Jobs
- Audio read by: Eileen Stevens
- Language: English
- Genre: Memoir
- Publisher: Grove Press
- Publication date: September 4, 2018
- Publication place: United States
- Media type: Print (Hardcover)
- Pages: 400
- ISBN: 978-0-8021-2823-2
- Dewey Decimal: 818/.603
- LC Class: QA76.2.J63 B75 2018

Small Fry: A Memoir is a 2018 memoir by Lisa Brennan-Jobs, daughter of Steve Jobs.

== Synopsis ==
A New York Times review says that "Brennan-Jobs herself never addresses the question of his legacy; her book is written from the perspective of a child longing for a father." It covers her childhood in Palo Alto with her mother, and her father's estrangement. It details emotional abuse, with Jobs even failing to name her as one of his children in later years.

== Reception ==
The New York Times gave it a positive review, calling it an "entrancing memoir" from a "deeply gifted writer" with a "singular sensibility". It concludes that "in the fallen world of kiss-and-tell celebrity memoirs, this may be the most beautiful, literary and devastating one ever written."
