= Muhammad Tulaimat =

Syrian painter (born 1941)

Muhammad Tulaimat (محمد طليمات) (born 1941) is a modernist painter from the city of Homs, Syria. He was born to a merchant family. He studied engineering in Aleppo, and then moved back to Homs to work at the Directorate of Water Resources. At that time, he was very active in painting until he left Syria to pursue his career in engineering. He lived for short periods in Libya, Egypt, Saudi Arabia, and Kuwait in which he stayed for 11 years. He then returned to his hometown Homs, and returned to his original passion, painting. A documentary on his life and paintings was aired on Syrian TV in 2002. Tulaimat is one of the original founders of the Association of Fine Art in Homs, Syria. He has held exhibitions in Rome, Paris, Beirut, Riyadh, and Chicago. His works are owned by museums and individuals around the world. He was kidnapped during the Syrian civil war.
