= Entertainment Industry Foundation =

American non-profit organization

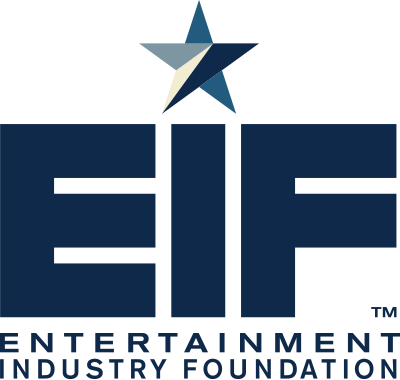
- Formation: Tax-exempt since November 1942; 84 years ago
- Type: 501(c)(3)
- Tax ID no.: EIN: 951644609
- Headquarters: Los Angeles
- Services: Donor-advised fund
- Revenue: 102,399,151 USD (2023)
- Expenses: 105,375,084 USD (2023)
- Website: eifoundation.org

The Entertainment Industry Foundation (EIF), based in Los Angeles, United States, is a 501(c)(3) non-profit charitable organization of the entertainment industry. EIF funds more than 300 charitable organizations annually, both in the Los Angeles area and throughout the entire United States. To date, EIF has pledged more than $1 billion for its philanthropic initiatives.

== History ==
The Entertainment Industry Foundation (EIF: formerly Permanent Charities Committee, founded by M. C. Levee) was established in 1942 by Samuel Goldwyn, with Humphrey Bogart, James Cagney and the Warner brothers. Their vision was to unify Hollywood's philanthropic efforts in order to maximize charitable dollars raised annually for worthy charities. They also sought to support World War II relief efforts. The “United Appeal” payroll deduction – a first for any U.S. industry – was launched and raised $1 million.

The Foundation's early work relied on celebrity involvement to support President Roosevelt's awareness campaign to eradicate childhood polio. EIF donated its first grants directed to wartime agencies like the United Service Organizations and American Red Cross, and to the L.A. paramedic program.

== EIF initiatives ==
The Entertainment Industry Foundation supports health initiatives for cancer, diabetes, and HIV/AIDS. It also seeks to raise awareness about important social and educational issues – especially those affecting children. Its programs support charities for hunger and nutrition as well as quick response funding for Disaster Relief worldwide.

Among EIF's programs are "Delivering Jobs", a campaign to create pathways to employment and leadership opportunities for people with intellectual and/or developmental differences; "Defy:Disaster", the industry's collective response to natural disasters; "Stand Up to Cancer", which funds cancer treatments; and the "EIF Careers Program", designed to enhance diversity in film and production careers.

EIF functions as an umbrella organization and fiscal sponsor for many artists, athletes, and influencers who seek to use their platforms. The Kevin Love Fund, Charlize Theron Africa Outreach Project, The Ukraine Children's Action Project, Live Free 999, Oscar's Kids, Panic! At The Disco Highest Hopes Foundation, She is the Music, Know Your Rights Camp, Cher Cares, and Social Change Fund United are among the organizations launched under EIF's platform.

== Stand Up To Cancer ==
Stand Up To Cancer (SU2C), a division of EIF and its largest initiative, was established in 2008 by film and media leaders to engage the public in supporting collaborative cancer research, and to increase awareness about cancer prevention and progress being made in the fight against the disease.

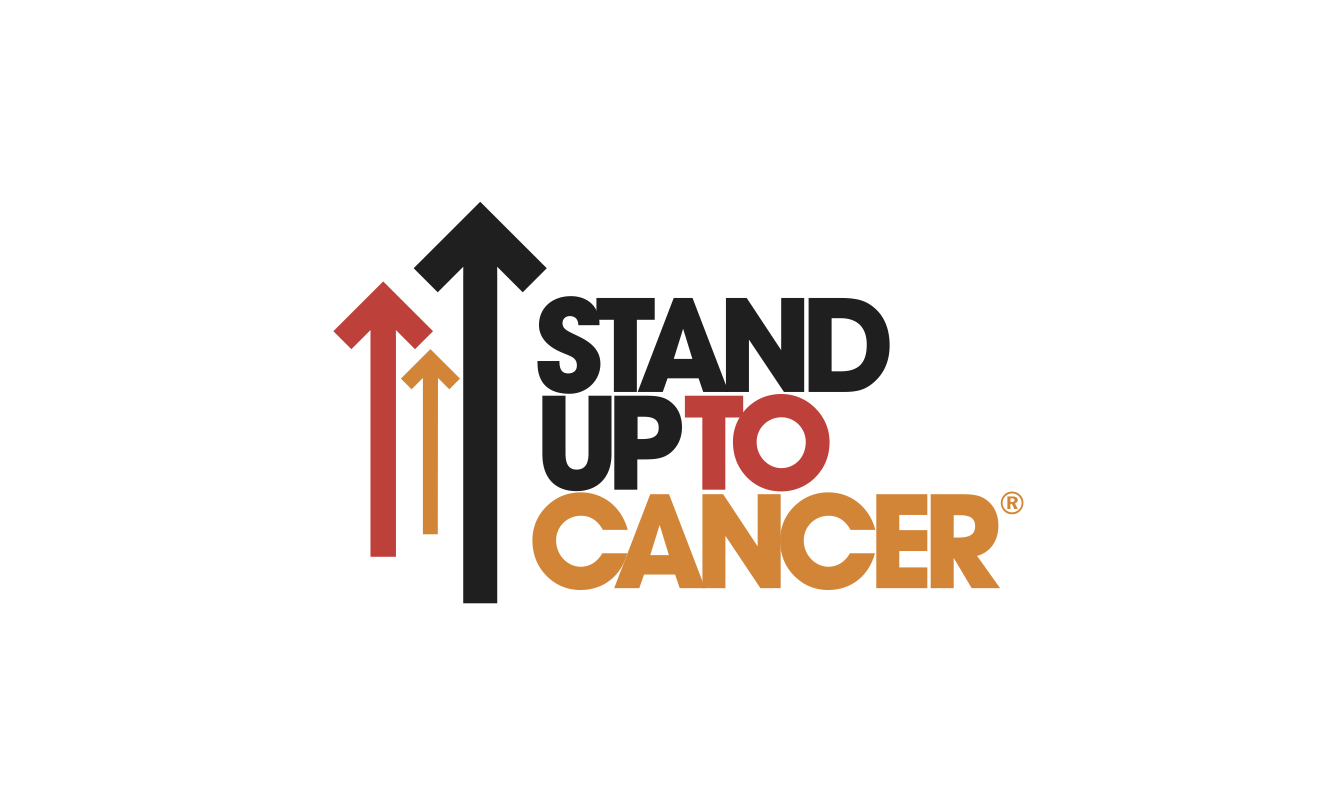

== Disaster Relief ==
EIF's ability to develop “roadblock” telecasts in support of disaster relief efforts is an integral part of its role within the entertainment industry. Efforts like Hope for Haiti Now, Somos una Voz, One Love Manchester, and Graduate Together have provided funding for organizations and communities around the world.

Defy:Disaster, the EIF's official disaster relief program, is dedicated to providing aid to survivors and communities affected by natural disasters to help them recover and rebuild. The program supports immediate and long-term disaster relief in highly affected areas.

City National Bank pledged its commitment to support the entertainment industry's disaster relief efforts, signing on as a title sponsor of Defy:Disaster.

== Education ==
The Thinkitup initiative supports education reform in the U.S. It was kicked off in 2015 with a live televised fundraising event. The program featured stories of teachers and students working together as well as live musical performances and comedic sketches. Thinkitup allows students and teachers to crowdfund projects and helps prepare students for life after school.

EIF collaborated with the XQ Institute on its Super School Project to help communities reshape high school so it better prepares students for success. Launched in September 2017, “EIF Presents: XQ Super School Live,” a roadblock telecast, was held on September 8, 2017, with live musical, comedy, and documentary segments that brought to life the past, present and future of the American high school system.

== Leadership ==
Nicole Sexton has served as president and CEO since 2017.

Board of directors members include:

- Jeff Bader
- Lynn Harris
- Dan Harrison
- Andy Kubitz
- Sherry Lansing
- Peter Seymour
- Chris Silbermann, Chairman
- Jack Sussman
- Natalie Tran
- Danice Woodley
