= Bassma Al Jandaly =

Russian-Syrian journalist (born 1977)

- بسمة الجندلي
- Born: 30 August 1977 (age 49); Leningrad, Soviet Union
- Occupation: Investigative journalist
- Years active: 2000–present
- Relatives: Steve Jobs (cousin); Malek Jandali (cousin); Mona Simpson (cousin); Lisa Brennan-Jobs (first cousin once removed); Reed Jobs (first cousin once removed); Eve Jobs (first cousin once removed)

Bassma Al Jandaly (Arabic: بسمة الجندلي; born 30 August 1977) is a journalist based in the United Arab Emirates; she worked as a community and crime correspondent at Dubai-based English-language newspaper Gulf News, and is known for her demonstrated interests in humanitarian causes.

== Personal life ==
Bassma Al Jandaly was born on 30 August 1977, in Leningrad in the Soviet Union (now Saint Petersburg), to a Sunni Muslim Syrian family. She has three sisters and one brother; her father Hassan Jandaly was a high ranking General in the Syrian army. She is also a first cousin of Steve Jobs, Mona Simpson and Malek Jandali. Jobs’ father Abdul Fattah Jandali and Bassma are still in contact, and she interviewed him after Jobs' death.

Al Jandaly has stated that Steve Jobs' birth name (prior to adoption) was "Abdul Lateef Jandali".

== Career ==
Bassma Al Jandaly started her career as a journalist at Gulf News, an English newspaper based in the United Arab Emirates. One of her more notable stories is the exposing of a United States national by the name of Sharla Musabih, who ran a human trafficking syndicate. Sharla was selling the babies of prostitutes who were sent to her shelter seeking help, all the while being portrayed as a non-government organization for women's right in the UAE.

On October 31, 2006, Bassma published the very first article regarding executions in the UAE.

In 2015 Bassma Al Jandaly left Gulf News and joined The General Directorate of Residency and Foreigners Affairs in Dubai as a Senior Journalist, Editor and Content developer, during which she was part of the Dubai government Permanent Committee of labourers’ Affairs in Dubai (PCLAD); she later resigned in 2017 to work on personal projects.

== Major activities ==
In 2009, Bassma was nominated by the state department in the International Visitor Leadership Program on effective women in the media in the US. While there, she wrote an article about her experience as a Muslim in the United States of America.

In 2010, Bassma was invited to join the President of the UAE Federal National Council to cover the Business trip to Algeria, which was an operation between the UAE and Algeria that was meant to strengthen co-operation between the two nations.

In 2013, Bassma interviewed the ruler of Ajman, Sheikh Humaid Bin Rashid Al Nuaimi; the interview focused on education and its importance.

in 2014, as part of an Official delegation visit to Kurdistan by Dubai, Bassma was invited to join the Dubai Chamber of Commerce for the inauguration of the representative office in Kurdistan.

== Arrest ==
In June 2005, Bassma Al Jandaly was departing on an official trip to Greece when she was stopped at Dubai airport and was detained for an arrest warrant issued by Sharjah police, for an article she had written about a man who had been slashing women in the emirate of Sharjah. The United Arab Emirates' interior minister at the time, Saif bin Zayed Al Nahyan, intervened and ordered her release; he asked the police to "rethink their policies when dealing with the media and press". Bassma was released immediately and the case against her was dropped; this in turn promoted increased freedom of speech in the country and gaining much attention from international media; the arrest was mentioned in the U.S. Department of State Country Report on Human Rights Practices.

The committee to protect journalists (CPJ) also wrote an article regarding the arrest; the CPJ Executive Director Ann Cooper said she was relieved that Bassma was released.
