= Chicago CRED =

American nonprofit organization

- Create Real Economic Destiny
- Formation: 2016
- Headquarters: Chicago, Illinois, US
- Managing Partner: Arne Duncan
- Website: www.chicagocred.org

Chicago CRED is a non-profit organization based in Chicago. The organization aims to prevent gun violence in the city by developing relationships and providing a presence within the community to defuse potential violence before it happens rather than by relying on police to intervene or respond.

The organization identifies both those most likely to engage in gun violence and possible potential victims of gun violence. It employs a violence interruption model.

Organization volunteers and staff, many of whom are themselves former gang members, intervene to persuade those likely to engage in such violence by offering them a stipend and access to support systems such as mentors, coaches and therapists. Therapists use cognitive behavior techniques. Individuals who remain in the program for at least a year receive help finding jobs.

When gun violence is threatened or expected, such as in the case of expected retaliation or tips received, staff and volunteers go to the area to provide a "peacekeeper" presence or otherwise intervene to try to discourage violence or prevent it from escalating.

The organization was founded in 2016 by Arne Duncan and Laurene Powell Jobs. Duncan, who returned to Chicago in 2015 after serving in the federal administration, conducted research in the Cook County Jail and in the community, specifically asking young men who had committed acts of gun violence, "How much money would it take for you to put down the guns?" He was surprised that the answer was a $12 to $13-an-hour job, at the time less than Chicago's minimum wage. He developed the idea of the stipend as a way to enable young men to accept help in the form of time spent in therapy and coaching as well as to attend high school classes.

The organization operates out of the Youth Peace Center in Chicago's Roseland neighborhood in the city's South Side. The organization's name is an acronym that stands for "Create Real Economic Destiny". A libretto written by Anna Deavere Smith that was based on her interviews of organization members was performed in Chicago as part of an opera in 2023.
