= XQ Institute =

American education non-profit organization

- Formation: September 2015
- Founders: Laurene Powell Jobs; Russlynn Ali
- Headquarters: Oakland, California, U.S.
- CEO: Russlynn Ali
- Website: xqsuperschool.org

XQ Institute is an American nonprofit organization founded in September 2015 by businesswoman and philanthropist Laurene Powell Jobs and Russlynn Ali, former assistant secretary of civil rights at the US Department of Education, to reform high school education within the United States. The organization is headquartered in Oakland, California.

== History ==
XQ Institute was founded in September 2015 by Laurene Powell Jobs and Russlynn Ali. The institute is an independent affiliate of Emerson Collective, a company founded by Powell Jobs that invests in entrepreneurs and innovators. Powell Jobs' decision to establish XQ was informed by her work with College Track, a nonprofit organization she founded in 1997 to improve high school graduation, college enrollment and college graduation rates for students from under-resourced communities.

XQ Institute was founded with the goal of changing the high school model in America, which is seen as obsolete. At its launch, XQ announced 'XQ: The Super School Project' as its first initiative, an open competition to redesign American public high school.

In May 2016, the project launched a traveling yellow school bus with an interactive display that visited schools and communities across the US to "ignite conversations about education reform between students, educators and community leaders." In September 2016, 10 teams were selected to receive $10 million each to create new schools or transform existing ones.

In September 2017, XQ Institute launched EIF Presents: XQ Super School Live, a one-hour telecast on ABC, CBS, NBC, and Fox. The show featured Ringo Starr, Tom Hanks, Common, Samuel L. Jackson, Justin Timberlake, and Jennifer Hudson.

In October 2019, XQ Institute partnered with New York City charitable organization Robin Hood Foundation to donate $16 million to help open new and restructured public schools in the city. The NY Times reported at the time that XQ: The Super School Project had given out more than $100 million in grants to help teams of students and educators implement ideas for new high schools.

In March 2020, Rhode Island Governor Gina Raimondo and state Education Commissioner Angélica Infante-Green announced at the State House that two schools, Trinity Academy for the Performing Arts and Ponaganset High School, were each getting $500,000 grants from XQ to find ways to redesign their schools.

In May 2020, XQ partnered with Los Angeles-based Entertainment Industry Foundation to host "Graduate Together", a virtual graduation for 2020 high school graduates, hosted by NBA star LeBron James, and featuring video appearances from celebrities including Barack Obama, Jonas Brothers and Pharrell Williams.

In 2024, a film called "The First Class" was released about the XQ school Crosstown High. The documentary was directed by Lee Hirsch ("Bully") and follows the founding class of students and teachers at Crosstown High. The public charter school was created by parents, teachers, students and other community members in Memphis, Tennessee to offer project-based learning so students are more engaged and see how what they're learning connects to the real world. Crosstown is also diverse by design, to heal a city scarred by racial segregation and takes students from all over Memphis. The film is available for free and includes many resources for teachers, parents, students, and other community members.

== Initiatives ==
=== XQ: The Super Schools Project ===
Launched in 2015, 'The Super Schools Project' was an open competition for new education ideas to reform high schools in America, with $100 million in grants committed by XQ. The project received nearly 700 applications from 50 states, with 10 teams initially given $10 million each to turn their application into a reality.

Results were mixed.

In 2022, XQ announced the DC+XQ partnership with the District of Columbia Public Schools, with a commitment of $25 million to fund new ways of learning. The Paul Laurence Dunbar High School and Francis L. Cardozo Education Campus were the first two schools to receive funding. In June 2023, XQ announced the expansion of the program to include four additional high schools across the DC area.

As of 2025, XQ's cohort of schools was 18.

=== XQ Yearbook ===
In 2021, the institute announced the launch of the XQ Yearbook, a digital yearbook of portraits submitted by students designed to engage and unite high schoolers across the country during the COVID-19 pandemic. For each submission uploaded, XQ donated to a national coalition of mental health organizations for the youth. The organization hosted other challenges over the years including a national contest along with civic engagement group For Freedoms for students to design visual art illustrating their vision for high school for the next generation.

== Organization ==
XQ Institute is headquartered in Oakland, California. The organization is funded by the Emerson Collective and is an affiliate of the company. As of 2025, XQ’s board includes Laurene Powell Jobs, Russlyn Ali, Marc Ecko, Yo-Yo Ma, Geoffrey Canada, Jimmy Iovine and Michael Klein.
