= Harry Charles =

British equestrian (born 1999)

Personal information
- Nationality: British
- Discipline: Show jumping
- Born: 15 July 1999 (age 27); Belfast, Northern Ireland
- Spouse: Eve Jobs (m. 2025)
Medal record
Equestrian
Representing Great Britain
Olympic Games
Gold medal – first place	2024 Paris	Team jumping
World Championships
Bronze medal – third place	2026 Aachen	Individual jumping
Bronze medal – third place	2026 Aachen	Team jumping
Bronze medal – third place	2022 Herning	Team jumping

Harry Charles (born 15 July 1999) is a British show jumping competitor. He represented Great Britain at the 2020 Summer Olympics in Tokyo, competing in individual jumping and team jumping. Charles replaced Holly Smith in the individual competition. In December, 2021 Harry won the Taittinger Ivy Stakes CI5* class individual jumping event at the London International Horse Show, staged at the ExCel Centre in London's Docklands, riding 15 year old gelding, Borsato (Contendro 1 x Nijinski). In 2024 he was a member of the British team that won show jumping gold at the 2024 Paris Summer Olympics, riding Romeo 88. Charles competed with a strapped arm after suffering a fracture four weeks prior to the Olympics.

== Personal life ==
Charles was born on 15 July 1999, a son of Peter Charles, a member of the team that won Britain's first team jumping gold medal for 60 years at the 2012 London Summer Olympics, and Tara Charles.

He attended Churcher's College.

Charles became engaged to model Eve Jobs in September 2024. They married at St Michael and All Angels Church in Great Tew, England on 26 July 2025.
