= Malek Jandali =

Syrian-American musical artist (born 1972)

Malek Jandali مالك جندلي
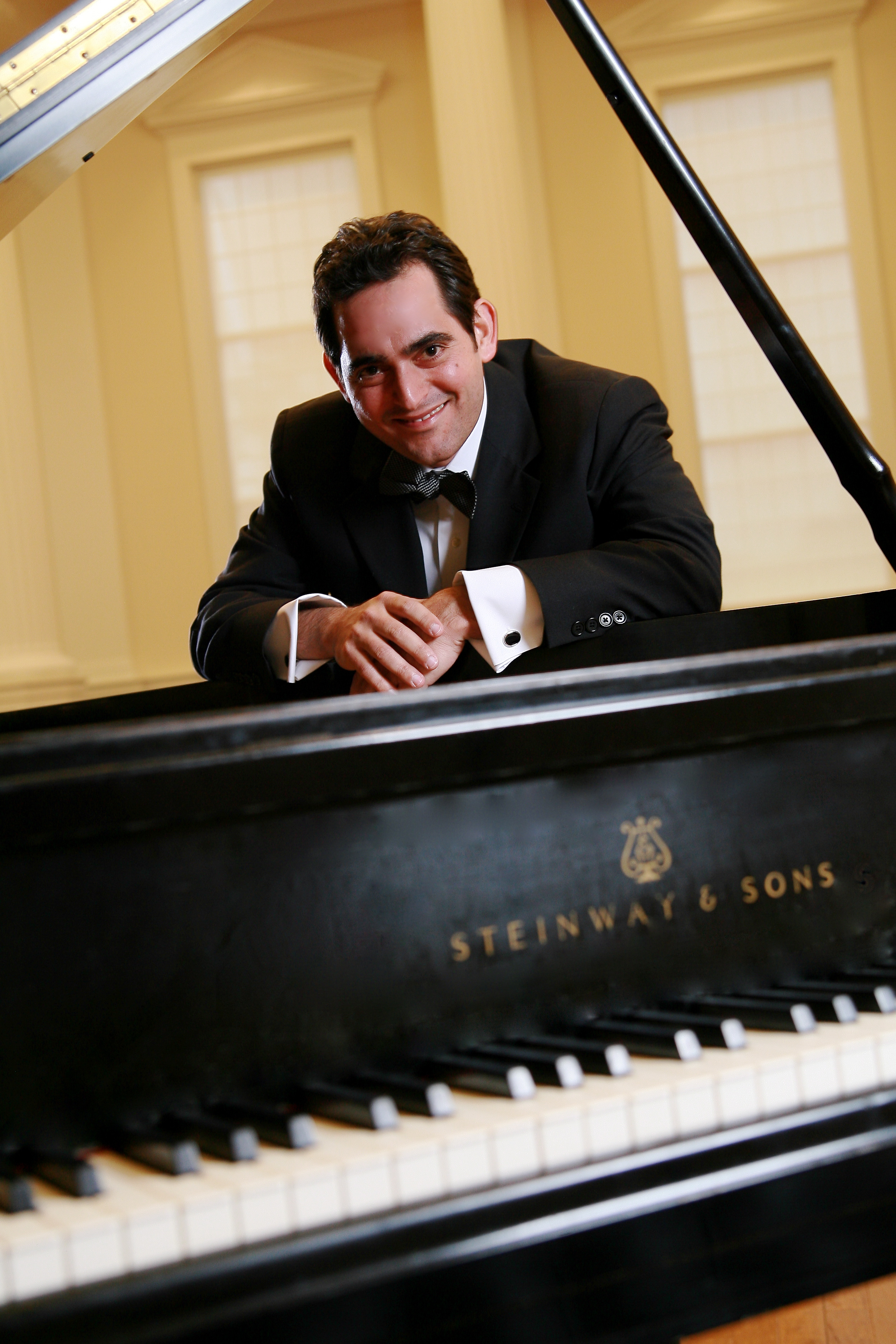

Background information
- Born: Malek Jandali; 25 December 1972 (age 53); Waldbröl, West Germany
- Origin: Homs, Syria
- Genres: Classical; Jazz; Classical Arabic; Film music
- Occupations: Composer, pianist
- Instrument: Piano
- Years active: 1981–present
- Label: Soul b Music
- Website: malekjandali.com

Malek Jandali (Arabic: مالك جندلي, Mālik Jandalī) (born 1972) is a Syrian-American composer and pianist, whose music integrates Middle-Eastern modes and Arabic maqams into Western structures of classical music. He is the founder of the nonprofit organization Pianos for Peace, which aims to build peace through music and education. He is composer-in-residence at both Queens University of Charlotte and at Qatar Museums.

Jandali immigrated to the United States and studied music in North Carolina. Since then, he has performed with orchestras across the world and composed a number of modern classical works. His music was described as "a major new addition to the 21st century symphonic literature" by Fanfare magazine. with "heart-rending melodies, lush orchestration, clever transitions and creative textures", according to American Record Guide. Jandali's music ranges from chamber works to large symphonic compositions integrating Middle-Eastern and Western influences. He is the biological paternal cousin of Steve Jobs and Mona Simpson.

== Early life and education ==
Malek Jandali was born to Mamoun Jandali and Lina Droubi, citizens of Homs in Syria. He has a cousin, Mona Simpson, a novelist and English teacher at UCLA. Other cousins include Mona's brother, Steve Jobs, founder of Apple.

He began his musical career as a classical pianist after his studies at the Higher Institute of Music in Damascus with Vladimir Zaritsky and Victor Bunin of the Tchaikovsky Moscow Conservatory. Jandali won first place in the Syrian National Young Artists Competition in 1988, and in 1995 received a scholarship to attend North Carolina School of the Arts under Eric Larsen. He graduated from Queens University, where he studied under Paul Nitsch and received the Outstanding Musical Performer Award of the school. While in the Charlotte area, he was an organist and choir director for St. James Catholic Church in Concord, North Carolina.

In 2004 he received his master's degree from the University of North Carolina at Charlotte and in 2015 the Carnegie Corporation of New York named him a "Pride of America" honoree for his notable contributions to society. Jandali currently lives in New York City.

== Career ==
=== As performer ===
Jandali has performed in London, Cairo, Damascus, Istanbul, Paris, Atlanta, at the United Nations Headquarters in New York, the Kennedy Center in Washington, D.C., the Stude Hall of the Shepherd School of Music at Rice University in Houston, the Konzerthaus in Vienna, the Kaufman Center and Carnegie Hall in New York City, National Auditorium in Madrid, Cadogan Hall, The Royal Conservatory of Music in Toronto, the Madinat Theater in Dubai, Sydney Opera House, National Museum of Qatar, and Museum of the Future in Dubai.

Jandali's compositions have been performed, recorded and commissioned by including the Cairo Symphony Orchestra, the Russian Philharmonic Orchestra, the Royal Philharmonic Orchestra, Ludwig Symphony Orchestra, Zagreb Philharmonic Orchestra, The Stockholm Solister and the Syrian National Symphony Orchestra.

In 2013 he launched his ongoing world tour "The Voice of the Free Syrian Children" from the Berman Center in Detroit to raise awareness and much needed humanitarian aid for the suffering Syrian children. The tour reached Europe and the Middle East with benefit concerts along with lectures and academic workshops.

=== As composer ===
Jandali has composed works ranging from solo instrumental pieces to chamber music and works for large ensemble or orchestras. He has a special interest in Arab music and combines the maqamat or modes with western harmony in his piano and orchestral compositions. Malek's compositions not only integrate Middle-Eastern modes into Western classical forms and harmony, they echo UNESCO's call to preserve and protect the rich cultural heritage of Syria and the Silk Road at a time when it is in danger of being eradicated. He incorporates ancient melodies from Aleppo, Damascus and other stops on the Silk Road in his compositions.

He released his first album of compositions for piano and orchestra, Echoes from Ugarit, in June 2009. The album was briefly in the international music charts of the United Arab Emirates. The title track is based on a hymn to Nikkal, one of the Hurrian songs inscribed on cuneiform clay tablets discovered in Ugarit, Syria, and thought to date from 1400 BC and thus to be the oldest notated music in the world.

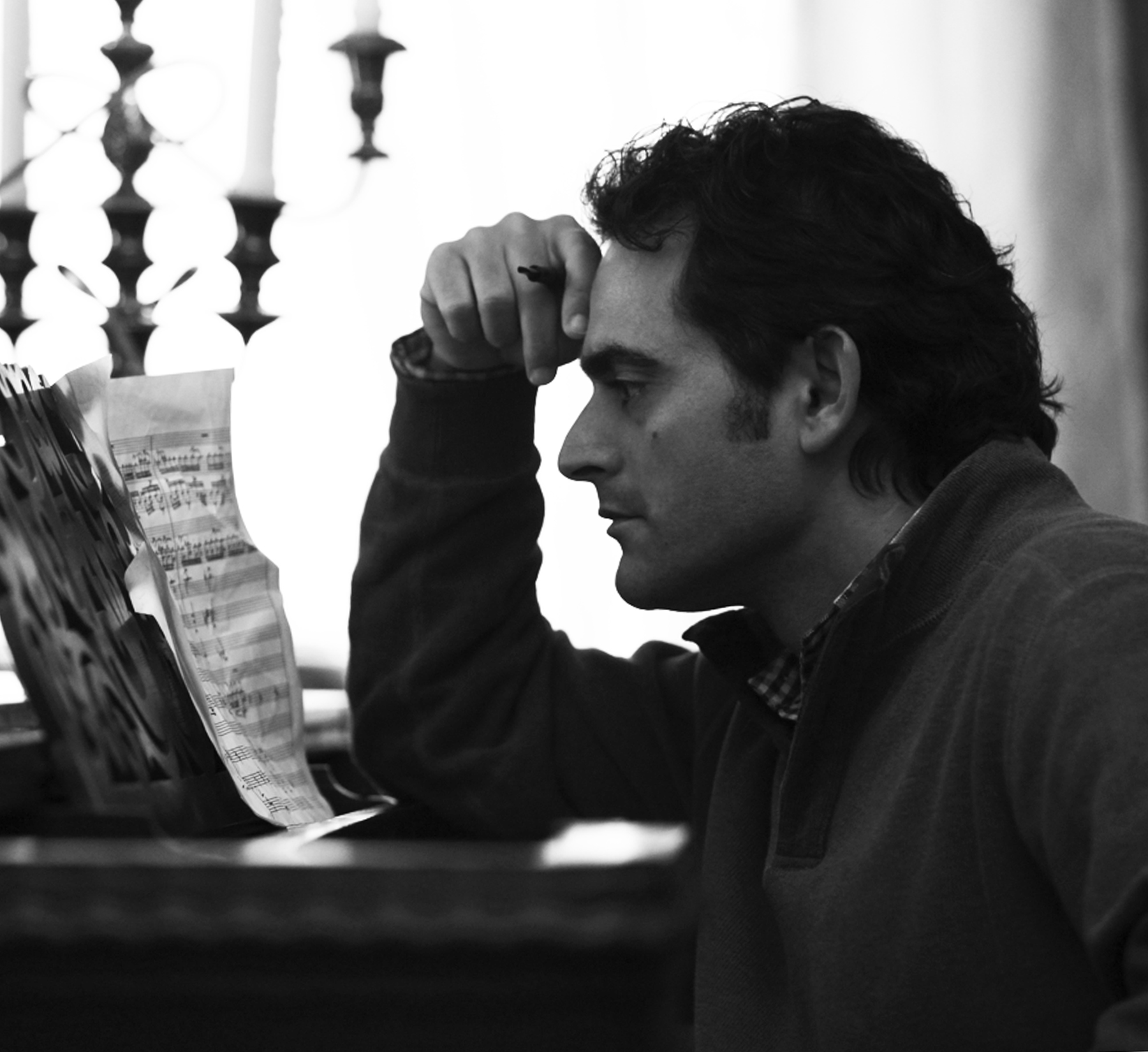
Malek Jandali composer

In early 2012 Jandali released his album Emessa (Homs), which he dedicated to "the Syrian people and their noble quest for freedom - especially the people of Homs". The album includes his Freedom Qashoush Symphony, named after Ibrahim Qashoush, who wrote a song popular with Syrian protesters and who was killed and had his vocal cords torn out.

Jandali's Syrian Symphony was released in late 2014 and premiered at Carnegie Hall in January 2015. The album includes three major works, "Syrian Symphony" presented in four movements recorded with the Russian Philharmonic Orchestra, "Variations for Piano and Orchestra", based on the ancient Syrian theme 'Lamma Bada Yatathana', and "Phoenix in Exile", recorded with the Royal Philharmonic Orchestra in London.

In 2015 his latest album SoHo was released, which tells the story of his journey from Syria to SoHo in New York City and contains compositions that are inspired by and named after the works of Sufi poets Rumi and Ibn Arabi as well as poets Rita Dove, Gabriela Mistral among others. The album features his chamber works for piano, oud and cello, performed by the Malek Jandali Trio.

In 2024, he released his Concertos album, featuring his concerto for clarinet and orchestra which was selected as among the best of classical music in 2024 by The Washington Post.

== Activism and other endeavors ==
Jandali is the founder of nonprofit organization Pianos for Peace, which aspires to use the power of music to enrich communities through an annual outdoor festival and several year-round community outreach programs serving under-resourced local schools and organizations in Atlanta. He is also the founder of the Malek Jandali International Youth Piano Competition, which encourages talented young pianists from around the globe to embrace the music of their homelands and submit applications for the chance to perform at Carnegie Hall in New York City.

Jandali frequently contributes to charity events collaborating with international organization's UNICEF, MSF, Save The Children among others, to raise humanitarian aid for children in need around the world. He has visited refugee camps in Turkey, Syria, Croatia and Malta to raise awareness and humanitarian aid for refugees, and was inspired to launch his ongoing world tour "The Voice of the Free Syrian Children" in 2013. That same year he was awarded the GUSI International Peace Prize for his humanitarian and peace activism. In 2014 Jandali was awarded the Global Music Humanitarian Award for his contribution to peace and justice for the Syrian children.

Malek Jandali - Notes For My Homeland

Inspired by stories from the Arab Spring, in April 2011 Jandali wrote Watani Ana (I am my Homeland). In June his scheduled appearance at the annual convention of the American-Arab Anti-Discrimination Committee (ADC) was cancelled, reportedly because he planned to perform Watani Ana. The initial statement issued by the ADC did not make clear the reason for the cancellation, and attracted criticism from other organizations including the Arab-American Institute. The ADC issued a further statement in April 2012, in which it said that it had reached "an amicable resolution" with Jandali.

In July 2011 Jandali performed Watani Ana at a protest in Lafayette Park. Shortly afterwards, his parents, Mamoun Jandali and Lina Droubi, were severely beaten and their home in Homs was ransacked. Jandali blamed Syrian security forces for the attack, and told reporters that as his mother was beaten, she was told "we're going to teach you how to raise your son." Photographs published on Facebook showed evidence that the couple had been brutally beaten. In September two armed attackers broke into the house and again ransacked it; Jandali's parents were not there, as they had fled Syria after the previous attack.

Jandali is regularly invited to speak and participate in panel discussions and academic workshops. He was on the panel of the 2012 Doha Debates at Georgetown University in Qatar and was featured in the 2014 BBC series "What Freedom Looks Like". In 2016, he performed and spoke at the annual Skoll World Forum at Oxford University and Aspen Ideas Festival. In 2017 he spoke at the Sydney Ideas at the University of Sydney. In 2021, he spoke at the closing ceremony of the World Innovation Summit of Education (WISE) and in 2022 he performed at the Generation Amazing opening ceremony during FIFA World Cup Qatar.

Jandali has given lectures, masterclasses and workshops at numerous universities and institutions such as Harvard, Duke, Columbia, UCLA, Notre Dame, Rice, Vanderbilt, Fordham, CU Boulder, and Queens.

== Awards ==
- The 2011 Freedom of Expression Award - CAIR Los Angeles, USA, 2011
- The 2013 GUSI International Peace Prize
- The 2014 Gold Medal from the Global Medal Awards
- The Global Music Humanitarian Award, Los Angeles 2014
- 2015 Great Immigrant "Pride of America" by the Carnegie Corporation of New York
- 2024 Best of Classical Music by the Washington Post

== Works ==
=== Opera ===
- The Square (2023)

=== Discography ===
==== Albums ====
- Echoes from Ugarit, 2009
- Emessa (Homs), 2012
- Syrian Symphony / Phoenix in Exile, 2014
- SoHo, 2015
- Hiraeth, 2016
- The Jasmine Tree, 2018
- Piano Concerto No. 1, 2021
- The Desert Rose, 2022
- Violin and Clarinet Concertos, 2023

=== EPs and singles ===
- Watani Ana (I am my Homeland), 2011
- Syria – Anthem of the Free, 2013
- Ya Allah (O God), 2013
- The Moonlight, 2015
- Woman, 2023
