= Government Executive =

American news publication

- Editor-in-Chief: Tanya Ballard Brown
- Managing Editor: Chris Teale
- Categories: Digital publication
- Publisher: Constance Sayers
- Founded: 1969
- Company: GovExec
- Country: United States
- Based in: Washington, D.C.
- Language: English
- Website: www.govexec.com
- ISSN: 0017-2626

Government Executive is an American media publication based in Washington, D.C., which covers daily government business for civilians, federal bureaucrats, and military officials. Government Executive is part of GovExec, which is owned by Growth Catalyst Partners.

== History ==
=== 20th century ===
Government Executive's first issue, published in March 1969, featured a formal portrait of Richard Nixon and the headline: "What Government Can Expect from President Nixon". In 1987, the magazine was acquired by the National Journal Group, which was acquired a decade later by David G. Bradley, a businessman.

In 1999, Bradley bought The Atlantic Monthly magazine and renamed his company Atlantic Media.

=== 21st century ===
In 2007, Government Executive's information technology reporting was spun off into a new publication, NextGov, which covers technology and the future of government. In 2013, the company founded Defense One, which covers emerging national security issues. In 2015, it founded Route Fifty, which covers ideas in state and local government. The four publications, plus an associated events division and the Studio 2G content marketing division, became known as Government Executive Media Group.

In 2020, Atlantic Media sold Government Executive Media Group to Growth Catalyst Partners, a private-equity firm. In 2021, City & State was acquired by Government Executive Media Group.

In 2021, longtime editor-in-chief Tom Shoop stepped down and was replaced by Tanya Ballard Brown, most recently of NPR.

In 2021, GovExec also acquired 1105 Media Inc's Public Sector 360 Group, including Federal Computer Week and Washington Technology.
