= Fawn Johnson =

American journalist

- Education: Bates College (B.A.); University of Pennsylvania, Annenberg School for Communication (M.A.)
- Occupation: Journalist
- Employer: Bloomberg Industry Group

Fawn Johnson is an American journalist. She is a News Director at Bloomberg Industry Group and Bloomberg Law, overseeing newsroom training and development and shaping policy on the use of artificial intelligence (AI).

== Career ==
Johnson is a News Director at Bloomberg Industry Group and Bloomberg Law, covering domestic policy issues such as gun control, transportation, and education. She has specialised in immigration policy since the Clinton administration, and has covered federal policy — including education, labor, and financial regulation — through the George W. Bush, Obama, Trump, and Biden administrations.

Johnson wrote for The Wall Street Journal until 2010. From 2010 to 2015, she worked as a correspondent for National Journal, a nonpartisan Washington policy/politics publication aimed at government and industry insiders, where she wrote from the national perspective on domestic policy issues. That year, she joined Morning Consult, where she became Chief Policy Editor.

She appeared occasionally on PBS's Washington Week in the days of Gwen Ifill and occasionally as a guest or interviewee on National Public Radio.

She has appeared on C-SPAN discussing policy topics, and has also written for The Atlantic.

== Personal life ==
She resides in Washington, DC, with her family.

== Awards ==
- First Prize, Print – Small Market, Single-Day News Coverage or Feature, Education Writers Association National Awards for Education Reporting (2011), for "Report Card" in National Journal

== Education ==
- B.A., Bates College, Lewiston, Maine (1988–1992)
- M.A., Annenberg School for Communication, University of Pennsylvania, Philadelphia, Pennsylvania (1992–1994)
