= Barbara Bradley Hagerty =

American journalist

Barbara Bradley Hagerty is an American journalist and author. She has been a reporter for NPR since 1995.

== Life ==
Hagerty graduated from Williams College with a degree in economics and afterwards was employed by The Christian Science Monitor. Hagerty traveled in Asia for three years. In 1994, she attended Yale Law School on a one-year Knight Fellowship, where she earned a master in legal studies degree. She began working for NPR in 1995, where she covered the United States Department of Justice. She won the Peabody Award and Overseas Press Club Award with her colleagues for NPR's reporting of the September 11 attacks.

In 2003, Hagerty began covering religion for NPR. Hagerty's religious reporting has won her two Gracie Awards, a National Headliner Award, and a Religion Newswriters Award.

In 2009, Hagerty's book Fingerprints of God was published. In 2016, she published Life Reimagined. She lives in Washington, D.C., and is a contributing writer for The Atlantic.

She wrote Bringing Ben Home: A Murder, a Conviction, and the Fight to Redeem American Justice about the wrongful conviction of Ben Spencer.

Her brother is businessman and publisher David G. Bradley. She is a member of Restoration Anglican Church in the Anglican Church in North America.
