= Suzanne P. Clark =

American business executive

Suzanne Clark
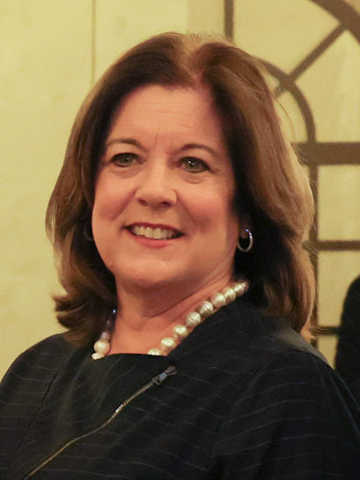
- Education: Georgetown University (BA, MBA)
- Occupation: Business executive
- Title: President and CEO of the U.S. Chamber of Commerce
- Term: 2019–present (as President); 2021–present (as CEO)
- Predecessor: Thomas J. Donohue

Suzanne P. Clark is an American business executive. Since March 2021, she has been the president and CEO of the U.S. Chamber of Commerce, the first woman to hold the office.

Clark was previously the chief operating officer and senior executive vice president at the Chamber. She became president in 2019 when Thomas J. Donohue resigned (but remained as CEO). Prior to the Chamber, she was president of National Journal Group (now Atlantic Media), and founded the Potomac Research Group.

Clark sits on the corporate boards of TransUnion and AGCO, and the board of The Economic Club of Washington, D.C.

== Education ==
Clark earned her undergraduate and Masters of Business Administration degrees from Georgetown University.

== Career ==
From 2007 to 2010, Clark was president of the National Journal Group, an arm of the Atlantic Media Company.

In 2012, she acquired the Potomac Research Group before returning to the U.S. Chamber of Commerce in 2014.

Clark was appointed to the boards of AGCO and Transunion in 2017. In 2020, The National Association of Corporate Directors named Clark an honoree of its Directorship 100, an annual list of the leading corporate directors.

Clark serves as a board member of The Economic Club of Washington, D.C. and the So Others Might Eat foundation. She is also the former president of the International Women's Forum's Washington chapter.

=== U.S. Chamber of Commerce ===
Clark's career with the U.S. Chamber of Commerce began in 1997, when she took a position as a top aide to then-CEO Tom J. Donohue. Between 1997 and 2007, Clark held multiple senior positions within the organization, ultimately serving as chief operating officer.

In 2014, Clark was named senior executive vice president of the U.S. Chamber. In June 2019, she was appointed as president of the Chamber, becoming the first female president in the group's 107-year history. In March 2021, Clark succeeded Donohue's 24-year tenure as CEO of the Chamber. Her focus is meeting with lawmakers to shape federal legislation in a pro-business direction.
