= Moses Dresser Phillips =

American publisher

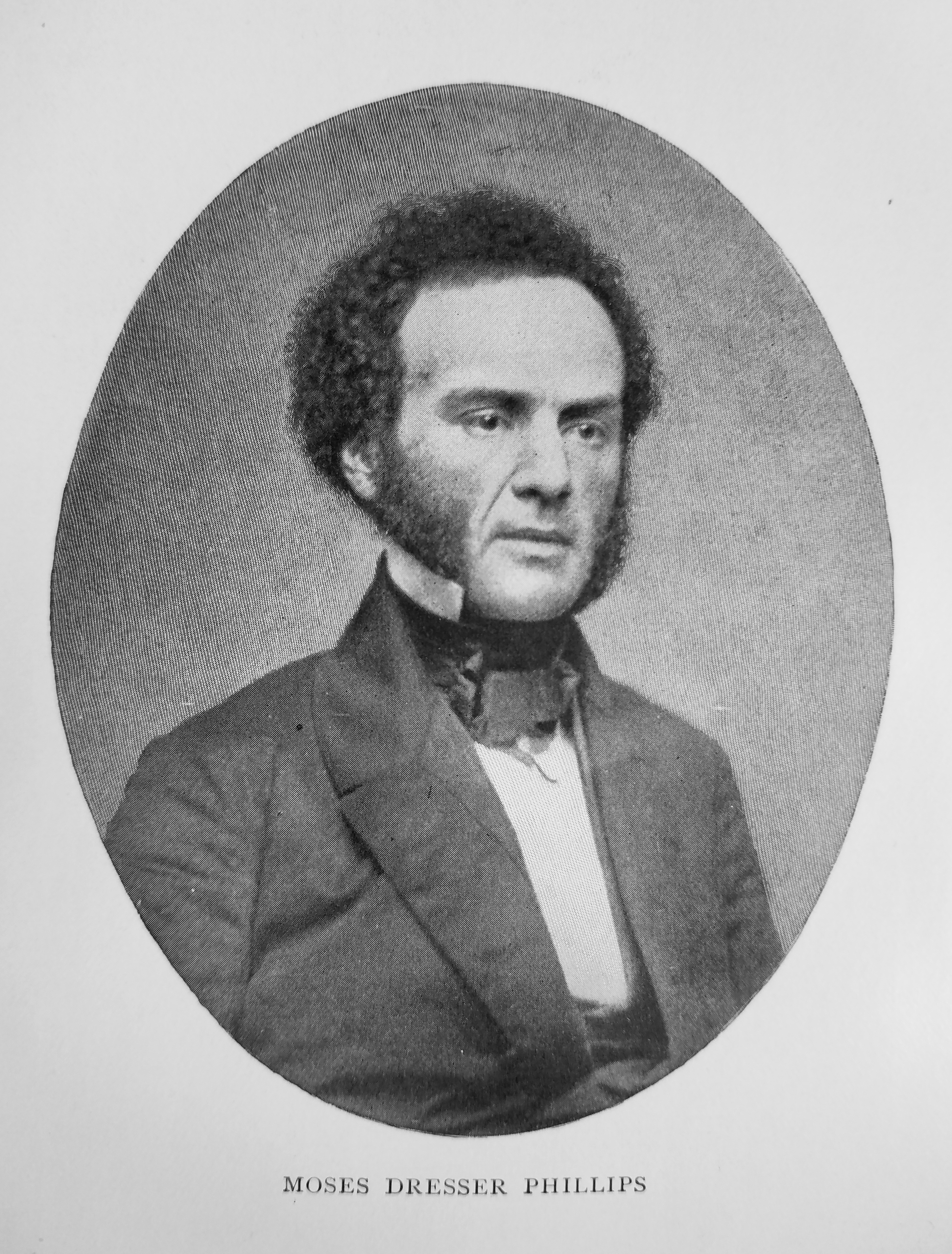
Phillips, date unknown

Moses Dresser Phillips (May 15, 1813 – August 20, 1859) was an American publisher of books and magazines best known for creating The Atlantic Monthly.

== Biography ==
Phillips was born in Charlton, Massachusetts. At age 18 he moved to Worcester, Massachusetts, where he served as a bookstore clerk in the shop of Clarendon Harris. In 1835 he established his own bookstore in partnership with William Lincoln, and around 1843, in partnership with Charles Sampson, he founded the Boston publishing house of Phillips & Sampson (later Phillips, Sampson & Company). Phillips told an anecdote, recounted by Edward Everett Hale, of their first orders from San Francisco during the Gold Rush year of 1849: "So many hundred packs of 'Highland' cards, so many of the 'True Thomas' cards, and so on till the box was nearly full, and then 'one dozen Bibles.'" This was seed corn, as he said. By 1852 or 1853, the orders were for "Four hundred Byron's Poems, four hundred Scott's Poems, one hundred Cowper's Poems" and so on in large shipments.

In the autumn of 1857, Phillips and Sampson determined to create and publish The Atlantic Monthly. Their plan was launched in a dinner-party, as described in a letter by Phillips:

I must tell you about a little dinner-party I gave about two weeks ago. It would be proper, perhaps, to state the origin of it was a desire to confer with my literary friends on a somewhat extensive literary project, the particulars of which I shall reserve till you come. But to the Party: My invitations included only R. W. Emerson, H. W. Longfellow, J. R. Lowell, Mr. Motley (the 'Dutch Republic' man), O. W. Holmes, Mr. Cabot, and Mr. Underwood, our literary man. Imagine your uncle as the head of such a table, with such guests. The above named were the only ones invited, and they were all present. We sat down at three P.M., and rose at eight. The time occupied was longer by about four hours and thirty minutes than I am in the habit of consuming in that kind of occupation, but it was the richest time intellectually by all odds that I have ever had. Leaving myself and 'literary man' out of the group, I think you will agree with me that it would be difficult to duplicate that number of such conceded scholarship in the whole country besides.... Each one is known alike on both sides of the Atlantic, and is read beyond the limits of the English language.

At that dinner, he announced his idea for a magazine:

Mr. Cabot is much wiser than I am. Dr. Holmes can write funnier verses than I can. Mr. Motley can write history better than I. Mr. Emerson is a philosopher and I am not. Mr. Lowell knows more of the old poets than I. But none of you knows the American people as well as I do.

The first issue of The Atlantic was published in November 1857, and quickly gained fame as one of the finest magazines in the English-speaking world.

Phillips died at age 46 in his house in Brookline, Massachusetts.
