= Anthony D. Salzman =

American businessman

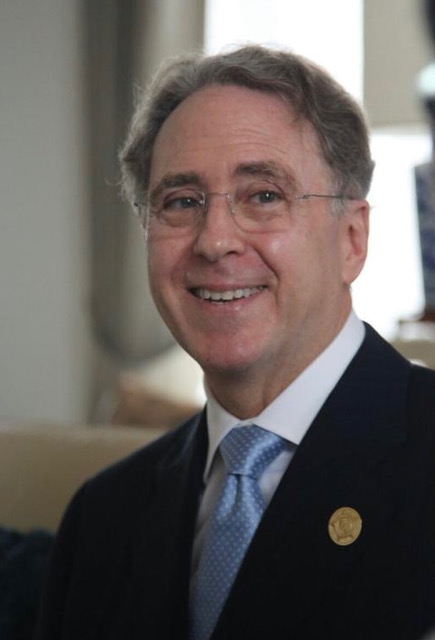
- Born: November 18, 1951 (age 74); United States
- Education: Yale University, Duke Law School
- Occupation: Businessman
- Organization: V-TRAC Group
- Known for: Helping to lift the U.S. trade Embargo against Vietnam (1994)

Anthony D. Salzman is an American businessman. He helped set up the American Chamber of Commerce in Hanoi, Vietnam, advocated for lifting the U.S. trade Embargo against Vietnam (1994), the U.S.-Vietnam Bilateral Trade Agreement that was signed in 2001, and contributed to Vietnam's integration into global intellectual property treaties in 2004.

Salzman also established the first American company in Hanoi and was a member of the founding Board of Trustees of The United Nations School of Hanoi (“UNIS”). Salzman is also the President of the Ida C. and Morris Falk Foundation.

== Education ==
Salzman earned a BA from Yale University and JD from Duke Law School.

== Recognition ==
In 2010, Salzman was awarded "The Friendship Medal" by President Nguyen Minh Triet for his work dismantling the trade embargo and promoting the Bilateral Trade Agreement between the US and Vietnam, and was also awarded the "Capital Development Medal" for contributions to the economic progress of Hanoi city.
