= Adrienne LaFrance =

American journalist

Adrienne LaFrance is an American journalist, executive editor of The Atlantic and former editor of TheAtlantic.com.

== Career ==
LaFrance received her B.A. degree in journalism from Michigan State University and an M.S. in journalism from Boston University.

LaFrance is known for her coverage of American comedy, as well as her many years writing about technology, media, and political violence. She has profiled Judd Apatow, Albert Brooks, Gilda Radner, and several other comedians or comedy writers.

She was a national reporter for Digital First Media's Project Thunderdome. She has also served as a staff writer for Nieman Journalism Lab, at Harvard University, and a reporter in the Washington bureau of Honolulu Civil Beat, before moving to Washington state. Additionally, she worked as a reporter and news anchor for Hawaii Public Radio, managing editor for Honolulu Weekly and news writer for WBUR—Boston's NPR affiliate.

LaFrance joined The Atlantic in 2014, became editor of the website in 2017, then executive editor in 2019. Formerly a staff writer, she covered technology, politics and the media. Her writing appeared in The New York Times, The Washington Post, Gawker, Slate, The Awl, and several other newspapers and magazines.

LaFrance was on Fresh Air in 2020, where she talked about what it is like to be a person for whom facts matter, but to be immersed in QAnon and conspiracy theories for her reporting. Her reporting, titled "The Prophecies of Q", was called a recommended read to understand the group's storytelling techniques by CNN's media reporter.

She also spoke about gender imbalance in American news media on the radio program On Point.
