= National Journal =

American advisory services company and its magazine about politics

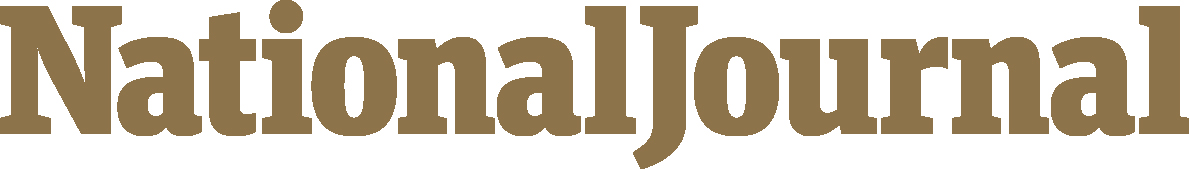

- National Journal, October 23, 2010; First issue of the relaunched magazine
- President: Kevin Turpin
- Categories: Research & Advisory Services
- Founded: 1969
- Final issue: December 2015 (print)
- Company: Bradley Media Holdings
- Country: United States
- Based in: Washington, D.C.
- Language: English
- Website: nationaljournal.com
- ISSN: 0360-4217

National Journal is an American advisory services company based in Washington, D.C., offering services in government affairs, advocacy communications, stakeholder mapping, and policy brands research for government and business leaders. It publishes daily journalism covering politics and public policy and is led by president Kevin Turpin, National Journal Daily editor-in-chief Jeff Dufour, and The Hotline editor-in-chief Kirk Bado.

Initially popularized by its weekly magazine, which closed in December 2015 after 46 years of publication, National Journal shifted to a paid membership model in 2011 and began providing strategic research and analysis through its suite of products for government affairs and public policy professionals. National Journal now serves over 1,000 members from both the public and private sectors.

== History and profile ==
National Journal was founded in 1969 as the Government Research Corporation, a premium research service and journalism company, and was published for many years by the Times Mirror Corporation, which also owned the Los Angeles Times at the time.

Anthony C. Stout owned the magazine from 1975 to 1989. David G. Bradley, who founded the Advisory Board Company and Corporate Executive Board, purchased National Journal and The Hotline from Times Mirror in 1997 to form the National Journal Group. Bradley also acquired Government Executive in his deal for National Journal, and added The Atlantic magazine soon after in 1999. Bradley later consolidated the properties to form Atlantic Media. In 2005, Bradley centralized all of his publications at Atlantic Media's headquarters in the Watergate Building in Washington, D. C.

Atlantic Media now publishes several prominent news magazines and digital publications including The Atlantic, Government Executive, and Defense One, in addition to National Journal Hotline and National Journal Daily, which are published under the National Journal brand.

== Products and services ==
Its core membership package includes access to daily journalism including NJ Daily and The Hotline, research and syndicated content from Presentation Center, Washington Briefing, and The Almanac of American Politics, strategic support resources, and events. National Journal also provides research and advisory services. Launched in 2017, Network Science Initiative, a product by National Journal, helps members achieve their advocacy and strategic goals by identifying key influencer networks surrounding specific policy areas and issues. In August 2020, National Journal launched Vignette, a database of in-depth profiles of influencers and policymakers at the federal, state, and local level as well as key international players. Members leverage this information to prepare for meetings and build stronger relationships in Washington.

== Journalism ==
National Journal's editorial products include:

- NationalJournal.com: NationalJournal.com covers politics and policy in Washington, D.C., including the following issue areas: White House, Congress, politics, energy, environment, health care, defense, and technology and cybersecurity.
- National Journal Daily: Originally known as Congress Daily, and rebranded in 2010 as National Journal Daily, the publication focuses on the legislative landscape and the inner workings on and off of Capitol Hill.
- National Journal Hotline: Hotline is a digest of the day's political events relating to upcoming national elections. Published daily, Hotline condenses newspaper, magazine and digital political coverage from the previous 24 hours. Hotline "Wake-Up Call" releases daily coverage of the morning's political headlines; Hotline "Latest Edition" assembles election and campaign news across the country. Hotline reporters contribute to National Journal's overall political coverage.
- The Almanac of American Politics: The Almanac of American Politics is a reference work that was published biennially by the National Journal Group from 1984 through 2014. In 2015, Columbia Books & Information Services became the publisher of The Almanac of American Politics. The Almanac aims to provide a detailed look at the politics of the United States through an approach of profiling individual leaders and areas of the country.

== Contributors ==
Some of its best known current and former contributors have been:

- Marc Ambinder
- Richard E. Cohen
- George Condon, Jr.
- Charlie Cook
- Matthew Cooper
- Clive Crook
- Susan Davis
- Tom DeFrank
- Yochi Dreazen
- Ron Fournier
- Major Garrett
- Shane Harris
- Kasie Hunt
- Fawn Johnson
- Josh Kraushaar
- Neal R. Peirce
- Patrick Pexton
- William Powers
- Jonathan Rauch
- Richard Rockefeller-Silvia
- Chuck Todd
- Murray Waas
- Amy Walter
- Kirk Bado
