= Cloud Pictures =

Book by Francis Henry Underwood

- Author: Francis Henry Underwood
- Language: English
- Publisher: Lee, Shepard, & Dillingham
- Publication date: 1872
- Media type: Print (Hardback)
- Pages: 166

Cloud Pictures (1872) is a book by Francis H. Underwood. It comprises four fictional stories, "The Exile of von Adelstein's Soul", "Topankalon", "Herr Regenbogen's Concert", and "A Great-Organ Prelude", which are chiefly musical in theme.
