= Harry A. Wheeler =

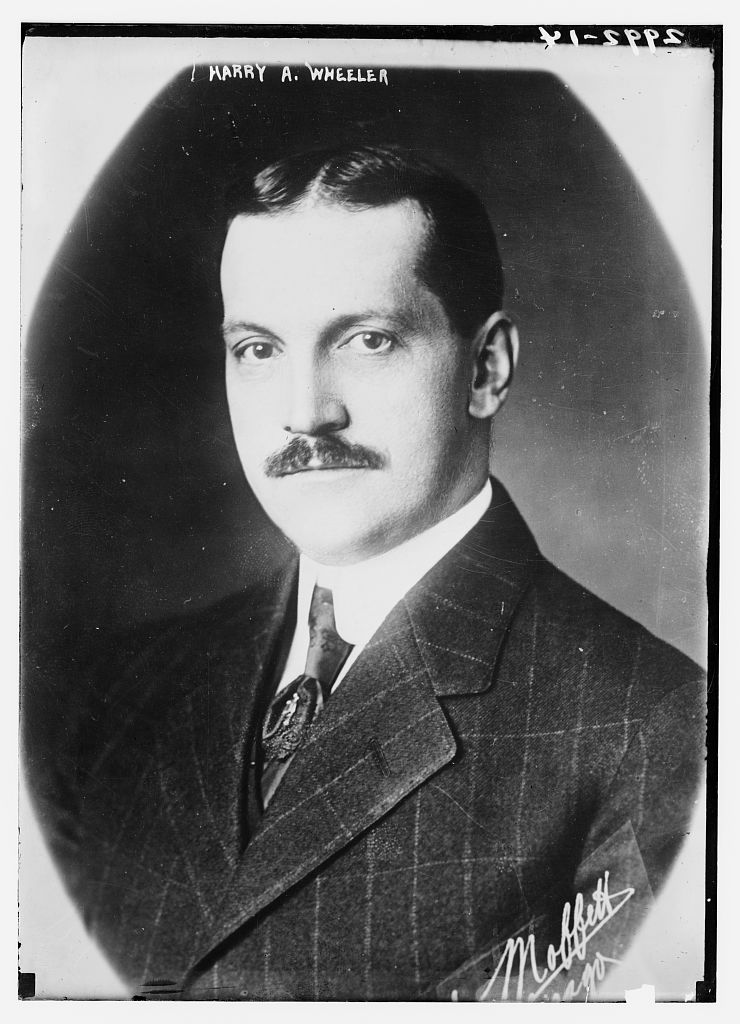

Harry A. Wheeler (May 26, 1866 - January 23, 1960), was first president of the United States Chamber of Commerce. In 1914 he declined President Woodrow Wilson's invitation to join the Federal Reserve Board.

== Biography ==
He died on January 23, 1960, in Los Angeles.
