= United States Chamber of Commerce =

Lobbying group

Coordinates: 38°54′1.8″N 77°2′15.4″W

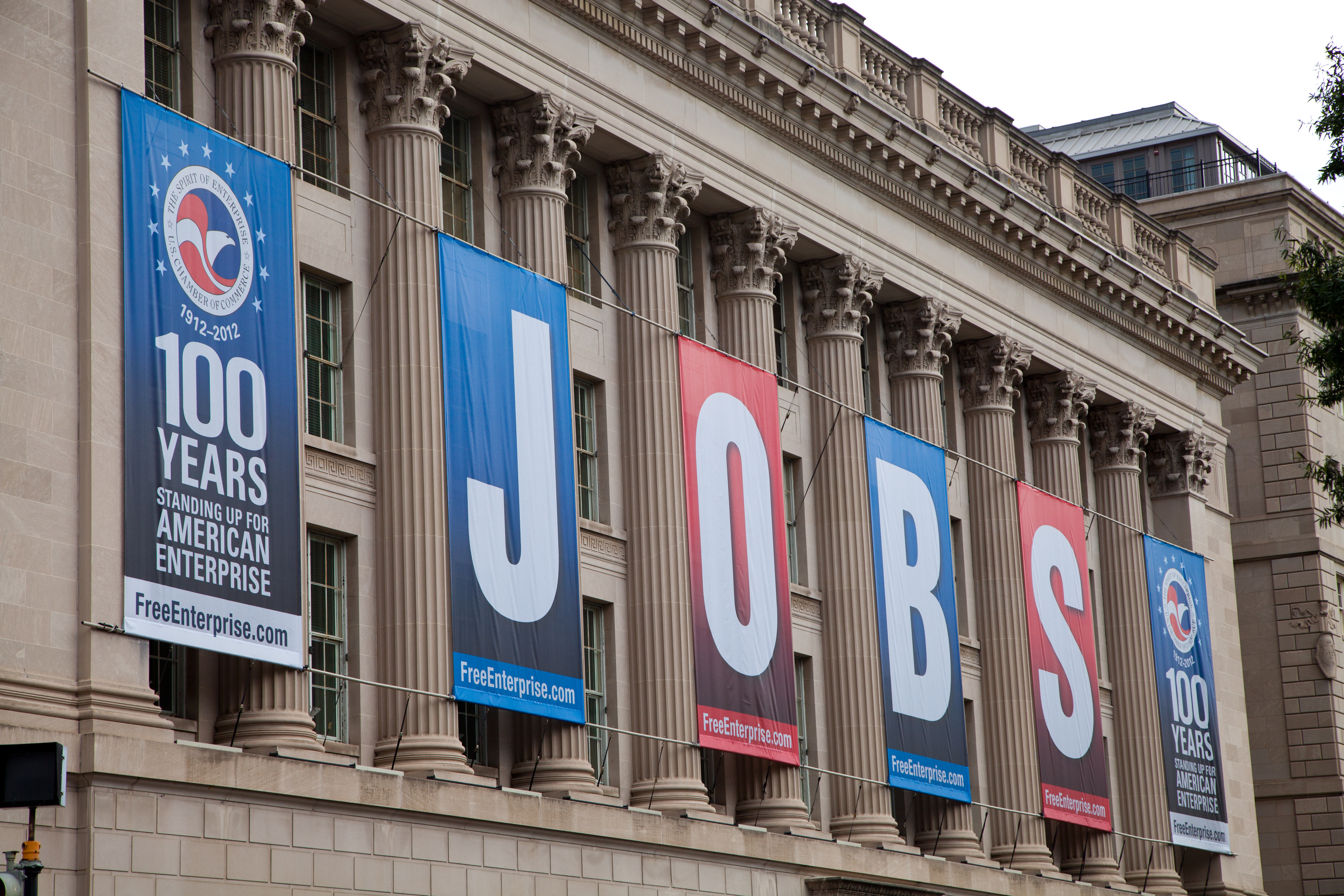
- U.S. Chamber of Commerce building facade in 2012
- Founded: April 23, 1912; 114 years ago
- Founder: Charles Nagel
- Founded at: Willard Hotel, Washington, D.C., U.S.
- Type: Business association & advocacy group
- Tax ID no.: 53-0045720
- Legal status: 501(c)(6)
- Location: Washington, D.C., U.S.
- Method: Political lobbying, public relations
- CEO: Suzanne P. Clark
- Subsidiaries: US Chamber of Commerce Foundation _{501(c)(3)}, Center for International Private Enterprise,_{501(c)(3)} USIBC Global Private Limited _{(India))}, Madison County Record, ChamberBiz, CC1 LLC, CC2 LLC, Article III Films LLC
- Revenue: $209,504,516 (2022)
- Expenses: $207,053,672 (2022)
- Employees: 483 (2022)
- Website: www.uschamber.com

The United States Chamber of Commerce (USCC) is a business association advocacy group and is the largest lobbying group in the United States. The group was founded in April 23, 1912, out of local chambers of commerce at the urging of President William Howard Taft and his secretary of commerce and labor Charles Nagel. President Taft's belief was that the "government needed to deal with a group that could speak with authority for the interests of business."

The U.S. Chamber of Commerce claims to represent three million small business owners, but this claim is disputed because the organization is funded primarily by the largest corporations in the United States.

The current president and CEO of the Chamber is Suzanne Clark. She worked for the group from 1997 to 2007 and returned in 2014, holding multiple executive roles before being named its first female CEO in February 2021.

== History ==
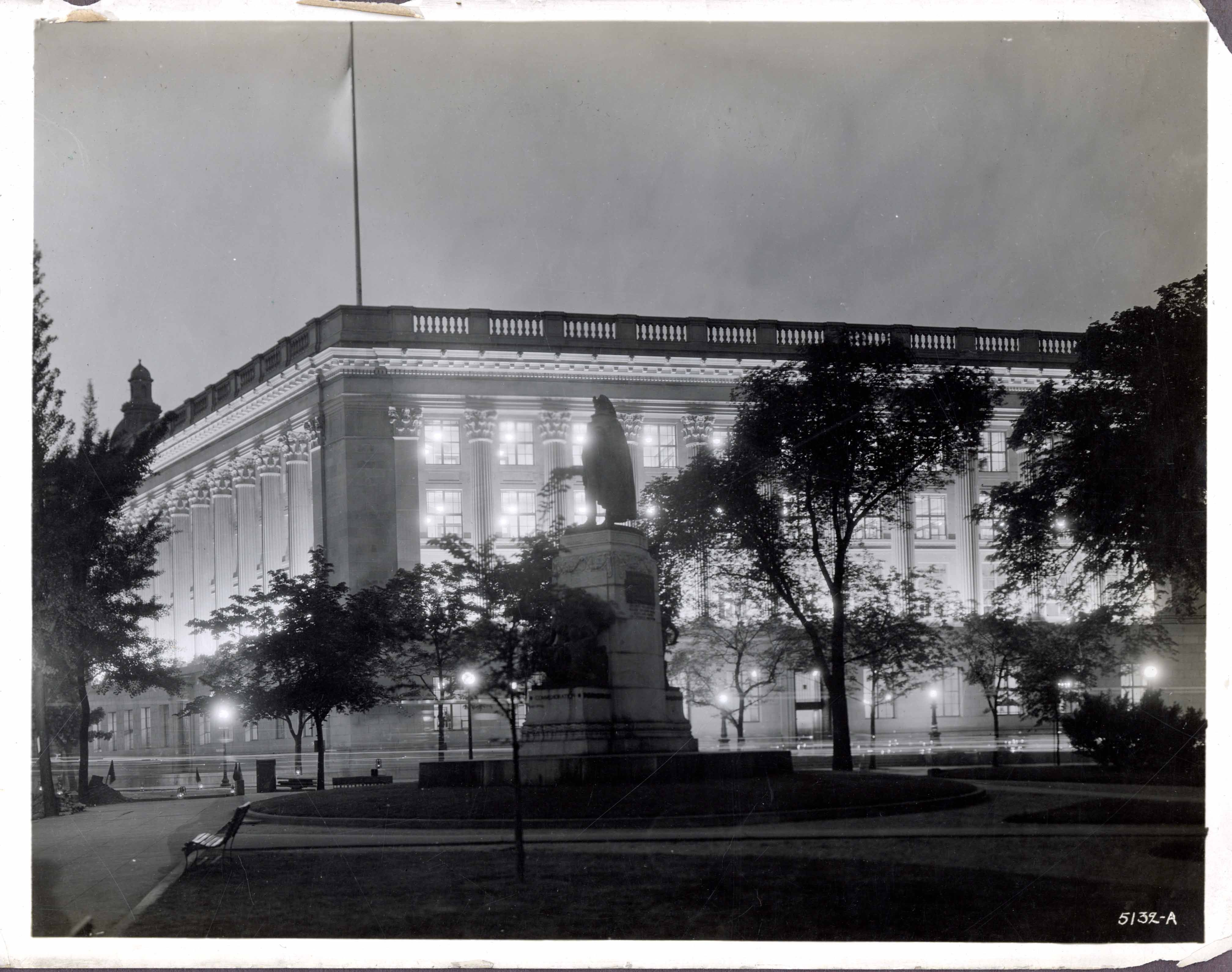
Night view of the Chamber of Commerce building, c. 1925

The U.S. Chamber of Commerce was founded at a meeting of over 700 delegates at the Willard Hotel in Washington, D.C., on April 23, 1912. Harry A. Wheeler was elected the organization's first president. Its first vice presidents were attorney and civic leader Joseph Nathan Teal, business tycoon and founder of the Coca-Cola Company Asa Griggs Candler, and business tycoon Arthur Briggs Farquhar. Its first treasurer was attorney and Civil War veteran John Joy Edson.

An important catalyst for the creation of the U.S. Chamber of Commerce were two prior business engagements between the U.S. and Japan. In 1908, Japanese business magnate Eiichi Shibusawa invited the first official, modern day U.S. business delegation to visit Japan. This delegation was led by the prominent banker/economist Frank A. Vanderlip accompanied by sixty business representatives from the West coast states of California, Oregon, and Washington. The goal was to bridge their nations diplomatically and to promote increased business and commerce.

In 1909, in appreciation for the hospitality shown to the 1908 Vanderlip business delegation during their visit to Japan, an invitation was now sent to Japanese business leaders to tour the U.S. This invitation came from the Associated Chambers of Commerce of the Pacific Coast, whose membership included eight principal cities from western coastal states of California, Oregon, and Washington. Their invitation was accepted by the Japanese, and in 1909, Shibusawa, accompanied by his delegation of over fifty of Japan's most prominent business leaders and notables spent three months visiting 53 cities across America.

Their travels were highlighted in many newspapers as they journeyed in a specially outfitted 'Million Dollar Train', provided by the American industrial community. The U.S. government recognized the significance of their visit, it and sent U.S. representatives to accompany and assist them during their trip. Six representatives of the Associated Chambers of Commerce of the Pacific Coast also accompanied them in order to help facilitate the events along the way.

Their meetings included many chambers of commerce, tours of factories, power plants, fire departments, port facilities, mines, farms, schools, universities, libraries, theaters, churches, hospitals, and many other facilities. Their main goals to develop friendship and familiarity between the two nations while encouraging bilateral trade and commerce. An important influence of their visit was that it connected chambers of commerce across U.S., which likely motivated them to recognize the benefits of becoming a national organization. President Taft was one of the U.S. leaders that Shibusawa and his delegates met with during their visit.

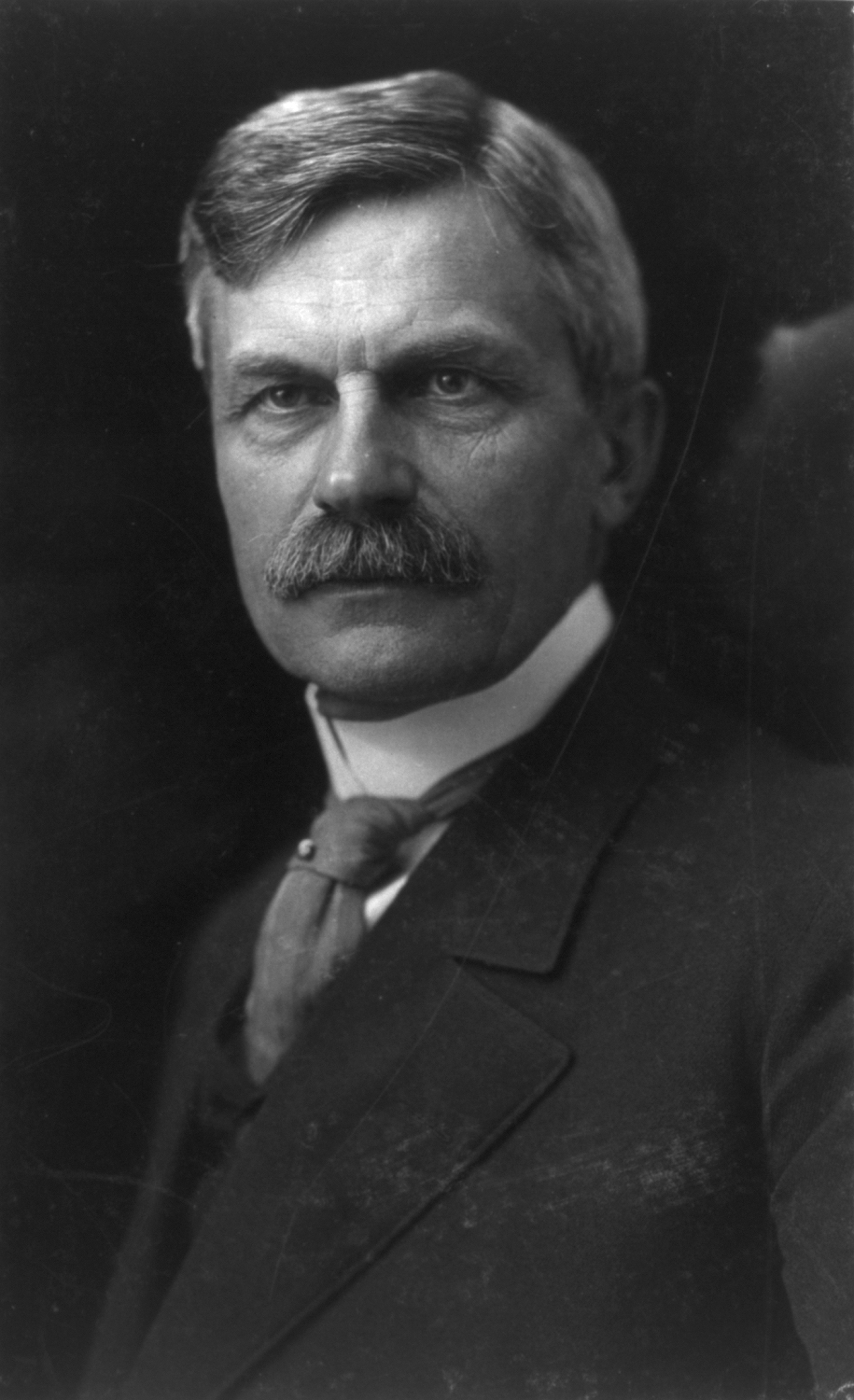
Charles Nagel, United States Secretary of Commerce and Labor and founder of the United States Chamber of Commerce

The Chamber was created by President Taft as a counterbalance to the labor movement of the time. John H. Fahey was the first chairman, and Harry A. Wheeler was the first president and Elliot Hersey Goodwin was the first secretary. It opened its first office in the Evans Building. In 1913, President Taft spoke at its first banquet at the Willard Hotel, where he called for the organization to lobby for comprehensive currency legislation and to support the Commission on Economy and Efficiency. During its first year in existence, the U.S. Chamber of Commerce's membership consisted of 297 commercial organizations and 165,000 firms and individuals. The U.S. Chamber's staff grew drastically in just ten years of being created. In 1912, there were only four employees. However, by the time 1921 came along, the number of employees had risen to three hundred.

During the 1919 U.S. Chamber board meeting, Harry A. Wheeler proposed an idea that surprised many in the Chamber itself. The idea was to create a national headquarters. Wheeler stated during this proposal that the Board of Directors should take this vote very seriously in deciding whether or not to make a national headquarters due to having to pay for it with their own money. Nevertheless, the Board of Directors didn't hesitate with their answer and they began the process to create the headquarters. Wheeler and Edson already had a planned location for where they believed the headquarters should be. The location was facing the White House on the corner of Lafayette Square. The only thing that was stopping them from building were two 19th-century mansions: the Corcoran House and the Slidell house. Nevertheless, the mansions were purchased for $775,000.

The Washington, D.C., headquarters of the U.S. Chamber of Commerce occupies land that was formerly the home of Daniel Webster.

=== Promoting business ===
==== 20th century ====
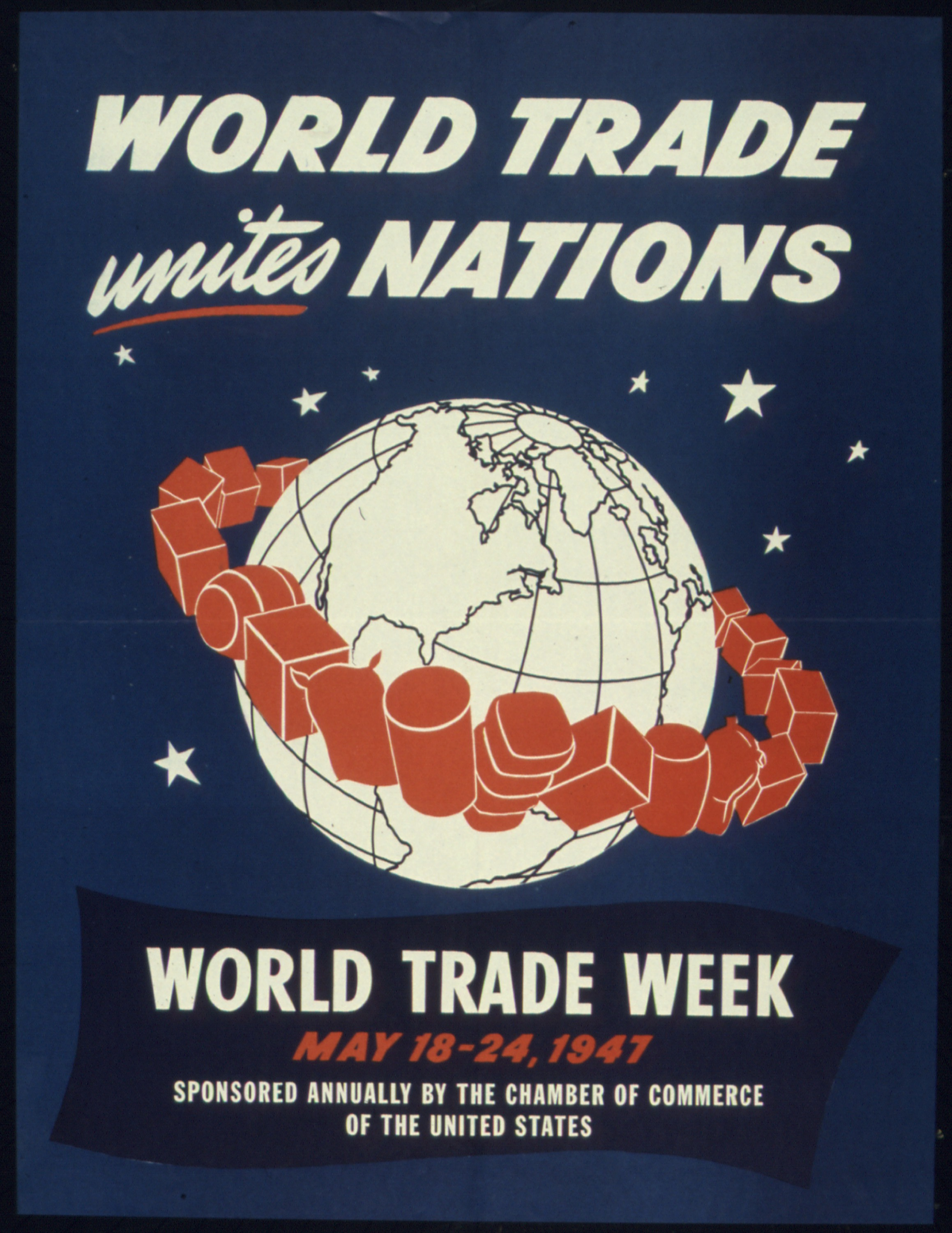
Historical poster for World Trade Week, highlighted the importance of global trade.

The Chamber's first referendum in January 1913 called for the planning of a National Budget. This calling for a National Budget created The Budget and Accounting Act of 1921. From there, the Chamber worked to aid the U.S. Government during both World Wars and through the Great Depression. During the 1960s, the Chamber thought of the business community in a different way. They didn't have a World War to fight, however, a war against crime and poverty.

During the oil crisis of 1973, the Chamber pushed for expanding domestic production. This entailed oil and gas exploration, as well as coal mining, and the Trans Alaska Pipeline. In 1981, the Chamber launched the Let's Rebuild America campaign to help support President Reagan's Economic Recovery and Tax Act. With increased globalization in the 1990s, the Chamber promoted expanding opportunities for the export of American goods and services in hopes of creating jobs for Americans.

Although various chambers of commerce can work with all levels of government, they tend to concentrate their efforts on specific levels: Local chambers of commerce tend to focus on local issues, state chambers on state issues, and the U.S. Chamber of Commerce focuses on national issues at the federal government level.

In 1993, the Chamber lost several members over its support for Clinton's healthcare reform efforts. The Chamber had chosen to support healthcare reform at that time due to the spiraling healthcare costs experienced by its members. However, House Republicans retaliated by urging boycotts of the organization. By the time health care reform became a major issue again in 2010–2012, the organization opposed such efforts.

==== 21st century ====
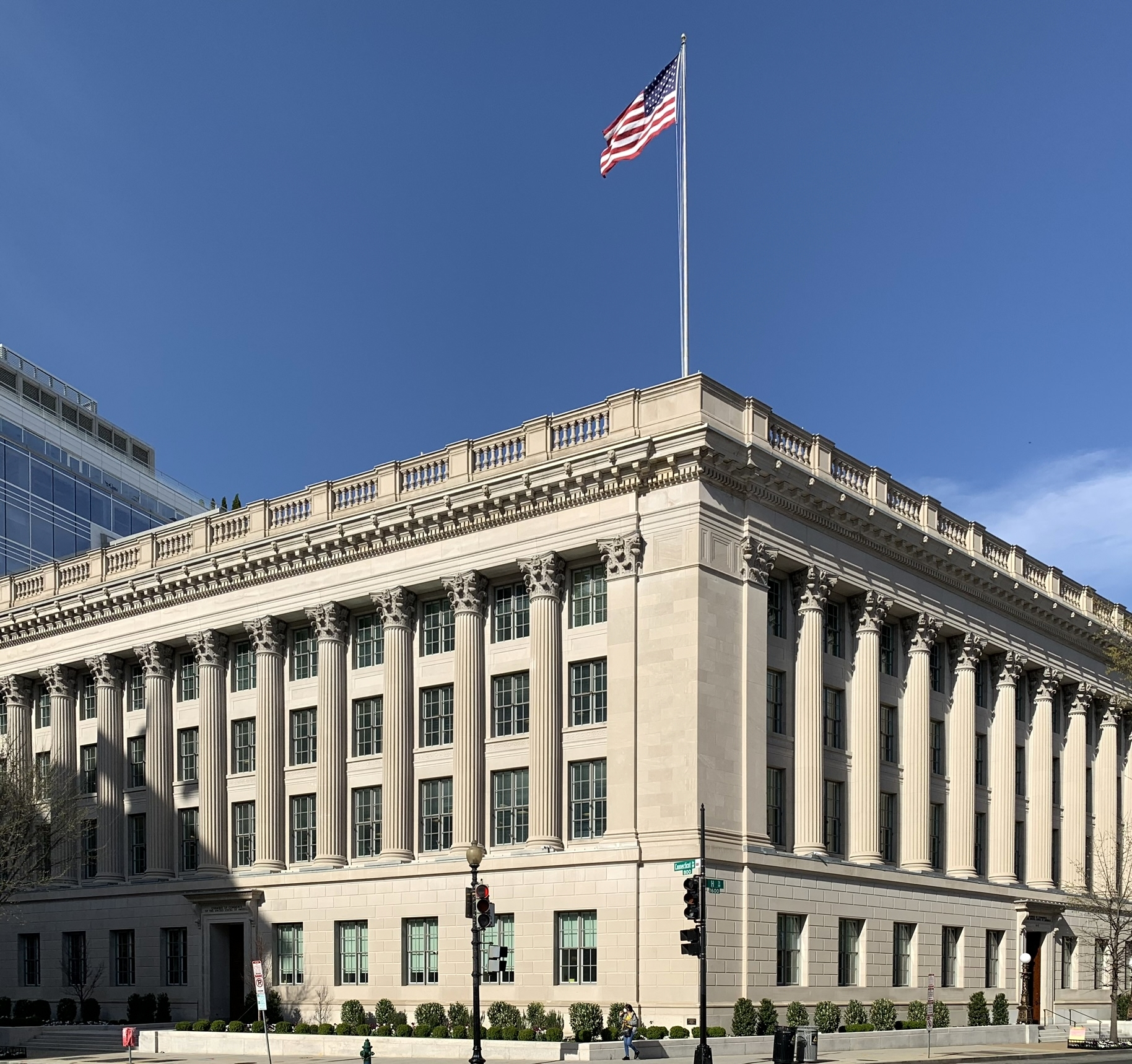
The U.S. Chamber of Commerce Building at 1615 H Street NW in Washington, D.C.

Thomas J. Donohue led the U.S. Chamber from 1997 to 2021. Though the Chamber claims to represent over 3 million American businesses, according to data, 94% of its income comes from about 1,500 big businesses.

In late 2011 it was revealed that the Chamber's computer system was breached from November 2009 to May 2010 by Chinese hackers. The purpose of the breach appeared to be gain information related to the Chamber's lobbying regarding Asian trade policy.

Since a 1971 internal memo by Lewis Powell advocating a more active role in cases before the United States Supreme Court, the Chamber has found increasing success in litigation. Under the Burger and Rehnquist Courts the Chamber was on the prevailing side 43% and 56% of the time, respectively, but under the Roberts Court, the Chamber's success rate rose to 68% as of June 21, 2012.

In the 2008 election cycle, aggressive ads paid for by the USCC attacked a number of Democratic congressional candidates (such as Minnesota's DFL Senate candidate Al Franken) and supported a number of Republican candidates including John Sununu, Gordon Smith, Roger Wicker, Saxby Chambliss and Elizabeth Dole.

The Chamber of Commerce was an opponent of the Obama administration during Barack Obama's eight years in power.

During the 2010 campaign cycle, the Chamber spent $32 million, 93 percent of which was to help Republican candidates. The Chamber's spending out of its general funds was criticized as illegal under campaign finance laws. In a front-page article titled "Large Donations Aid U.S. Chamber in Election Drive", The New York Times reported that the Chamber used contributions in campaigns without separating foreign and domestic contributions, which if true would appear to contravene prohibitions on lobbying by foreign nations and groups. In question was the Chamber's international branches, "AmChams", whose funds are unaccounted for and perhaps mix into the general collection.

The Chamber has refused to provide any concrete evidence to refute the allegations. In reference to the matter, Tom Donohue wrote his council and members on October 12, 2010. He stated, "Let me be clear. The Chamber does not use any foreign money to fund voter education activities—period. We have strict financial controls in place to ensure this. The funds we receive from American Chambers of Commerce abroad, bilateral business councils, and non-U.S.-based global companies represent a small fraction of our more than $200 million annual revenues. Under our accounting system, these revenues are never used to support any political activities. We are in full compliance with all laws and regulations." The organizations Moveon.org, Think Progress, and People for the American Way rallied against the Chamber at the Justice Department to start an injunction for a criminal investigation. The Chamber is not required to produce fundraising records.

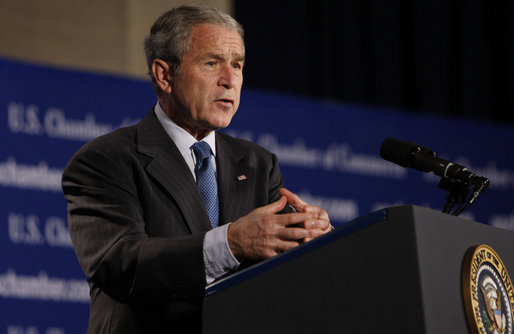
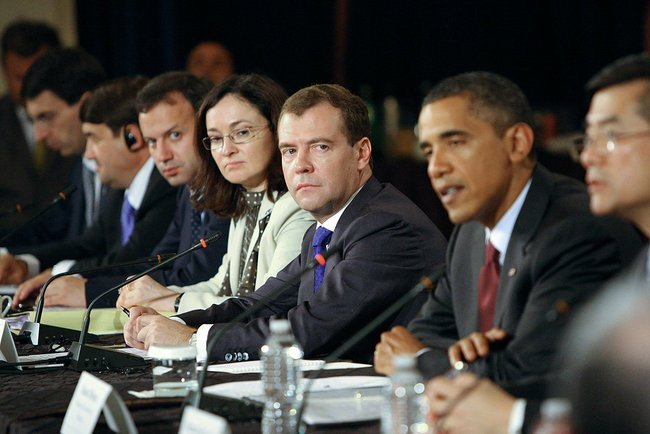
Through the year various presidents of the United States have taken part in U.S. Chamber events.

President Barack Obama asked the IRS and Federal Election Commission to ensure that the foreign funds that the Chamber receives are not used for political activities. Obama criticized the Chamber for not disclosing its contributors. The Chamber has responded that "No foreign money is used to fund political activities." After the election, the Chamber reiterated the nature of Obama's policy dictated action from the Chamber, however the conflict would not be made "personal".

Despite more than $33 million spent supporting candidates in the 2012 Congressional races, Chamber-backed candidates lost 36 out of the 50 elections in which the Chamber participated. In late 2013, the Chamber announced it would distribute campaign contributions in "tens" of Republican primary elections to oppose the Tea Party movement for the purpose of creating a "more governable Republican party." In early 2014 Tom Donohue clarified that the push would be to elect "pro-business" members of Congress "who favor trade, energy development and immigration reform". During Donohue's tenure as head of the Chamber of Commerce, the Chamber formed an alliance with the Republican Party. Donohue retired in February 2021 and was succeeded by former Chamber executive Suzanne Clark, who has been president and CEO since March 2021.

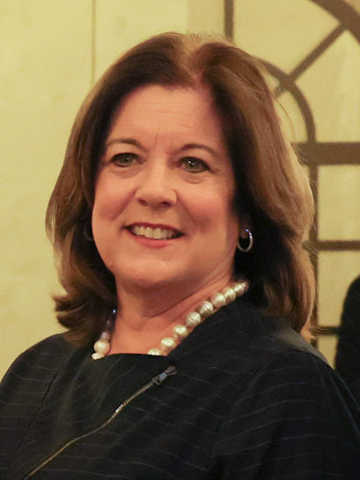
Chamber CEO Suzanne P. Clark

In recent years, as Republicans have backed more trade restrictions and anti-immigration policies and more Democrats have embraced immigration, free trade, and other pro-business policies, the composition of the Chamber's political support has shifted. In 2019, the Chamber updated the formula for its scorecard used to determine endorsements, to "more fully reward members of Congress for helping to advance pro-business policies, while simultaneously encouraging members to reach the compromises necessary for effective governing."

After Donald Trump refused to concede following the 2020 presidential election, and most Republican members of Congress supported attempts to overturn the election results based on false claims of fraud, the Chamber of Commerce released a memo to its members, stating it would "review the totality of actions of its members" and "take into consideration... future conduct that erodes our democratic institutions".

In 2021, Chamber lobbyist Neil Bradley said there would be a "political price" to pay for any lawmakers who supported the PRO Act, which the Chamber called a "litany of almost every failed idea from the past 30 years of labor policy."

Ross Perot Jr. was named Chair of the Board of Directors in June 2025.

== Positions taken ==
Politically, the US Chamber of Commerce is considered to be on the political right and promotes fiscally conservative policies. However, it is known to take positions that many Republicans (particularly populists) do not support such as immigration reform and free trade. The US Chamber of Commerce opposes tariffs.

The US Chamber is often associated with the establishment wing of the Republican Party. In recent years the US Chamber has endorsed some congressional Democrats for re-election.

=== Legislation ===
- Campaigned against portions of the Sarbanes–Oxley Act. (Introduced 02/14/2002) (07/30/2002 Became Public Law)
- Supported the SAFETY Act. (Passed 2002)
- Supported the American Recovery and Reinvestment Act of 2009. (Introduced 01/26/2009) (02/17/2009 Became Public Law)
- Supported the Food Safety Modernization Act. (Introduced 03/03/2009)
- In April 2009, the Chamber began an ad campaign against the proposed Employee Free Choice Act. Critics such as the National Association of Manufacturers have contended that additional use of card check elections will lead to overt coercion on the part of union organizers. Opponents of the Employee Free Choice Act also claim, referring to perceived lack of access to a secret ballot, that the measure would not protect employee privacy. For this reason the Chamber argued the act would reduce workers' rights.
- Opposed the American Clean Energy and Security Act climate change bill. (Introduced 05/15/2009) "[H]elped kill several attempts to pass climate-change legislation" between 1997 and 2010, but did not oppose efforts by Senators Kerry, Graham, and Lieberman in 2010.
- In November 2009, the Chamber was reported to be seeking to spend $50,000 to hire a "respected economist" to produce a study that could be used to portray health-care legislation as a job killer and threat to the nation's economy.
- The Chamber views some reform as necessary, but opposed the Dodd/Frank legislation that was passed, asserting that it would damage loan availability. (Introduced 12/02/2009) (07/21/2010 Became Public Law)
- Supported the Stop Online Piracy Act (SOPA). (Introduced in House 10/26/2011)
- Supported the Jobs Act of 2012. (Introduced 12/08/2011) (04/05/2012 Became Public Law)
- Supported the Workforce Innovation and Opportunity Act. (Introduced 02/25/2013) (07/22/2014 Became Public Law)
- Supported the Electronic Communications Privacy Act. (Introduced 02/04/2015)
- Actively lobbies against anti-tobacco policies implemented in other countries. In particular, it opposes attempts to carve out tobacco from the Investor-state dispute settlement mechanism negotiated under the Trans-Pacific Partnership (TPP) agreement. (The TPP was not ratified)
- Supported the Ozone Implementation Act of 2017 (Introduced 02/01/2017)
- Supported the Furthering Asbestos Claim Transparency Act. (Introduced 02/07/2017)
- Supported the Fairness in Class Action Litigation Act. (Introduced 02/09/2017)
- Supported the SAFE Act. (Introduced 03/16/2017)
- Opposed the American Health Care Act of 2017. (Introduced 03/20/2017)
- Opposed the Clean Power Plan. (added new bullet point) (On March 28, 2017)
- Supported the Reauthorization Act. (Introduced 04/25/2017)
- Supported the Self Drive Act. (Introduced 07/25/2017)
- Supported the Tribal Tax and Investment Reform Act of 2017. (Introduced 10/05/2017)
- Opposes the DISCLOSE Act, which aims to limit foreign influence on U.S. elections. (House - 06/27/2018)
- Opposed to using the government shutdown and debt ceiling limit as negotiating tactics.
- Qualified opposition to financial regulation.

=== Court cases ===
- Argued against mandatory immigration status checks by employers in Arizona including in a Supreme Court case.
- Filed an amicus brief to the U.S. Supreme Court in Citizens United v FEC to urge the court to overrule Austin and restore "free corporate speech." Its position is opposed by some advocates for independent businesses.
- Filed a lawsuit against the $100,000 increase in H-1B visa filing fees. In its filing, the Chamber of Commerce said that the increase is unlawful because the Immigration and Nationality Act requires that any visa filing fees be based on the government's processing costs and the $100,000 fees exceed those costs. The Chamber of Commerce also said that U.S. businesses would be harmed by the fees because they would need to either increase their labor costs or hire fewer highly skilled employees that they cannot find in the U.S.

=== Climate change ===
Until 2019, the U.S. Chamber rejected the scientific consensus on climate change. Historically, the organization has promoted the work of climate change deniers and sought to stymie efforts to combat climate change. In 2019, the organization acknowledged that humans contribute to climate change.

The Chamber's senior vice president for environment, technology, and regulatory affairs William L. Kovacs threatened to sue the Environmental Protection Agency in order to have what he termed "the Scopes monkey trial of the 21st century" on climate science before any federal climate regulation was passed in October 2009. Chamber CEO Tom Donohue disavowed the comment, but the Chamber strongly opposed the American Clean Energy and Security Act. In response to this position, several companies quit the Chamber, including Exelon Corp, PG&E Corp, PNM Resources, and Apple Inc. Nike, Inc resigned from their board of directors position, but continued their membership. Nike stated that they believe they can better influence the policy by being part of the conversation.

Peter Darbee, CEO of former chamber member PG&E (a natural gas and electric utility company in California), said, "We find it dismaying that the Chamber neglects the indisputable fact that a decisive majority of experts have said the data on global warming are compelling... In our view, an intellectually honest argument over the best policy response to the challenges of climate change is one thing; disingenuous attempts to diminish or distort the reality of these challenges are quite another." In response to an online campaign of Prius owners organized by Moveon.org, Toyota stated that it would not leave the Chamber. The Aspen Chamber Resort Association of Aspen, Colorado left the U.S. Chamber because of its views on climate change, in light of how climate change could hurt Aspen's winter tourism industry.

In 2010, U.S. Chamber president Tom Donohue agreed to work with Senators John Kerry, Lindsey Graham, and Joe Lieberman as they crafted legislation to address climate change; the effort fell apart and failed to produce a bill. The climate campaign organization 350.org estimated that 94% of US Chamber of Commerce political contributions during the 2010 midterm elections went to candidates denying the scientific consensus on climate change.

In March 2017, before President Trump withdrew the US from the Paris Agreement, the Chamber funded a report that said the US commitments under the international agreement would significantly reduce industrial sector jobs.

In October 2017, Karen Harbert, CEO of the U.S. Chamber's Global Energy Institute, published an op-ed in USA Today criticizing the EPA's Clean Power Plan, saying, "The plan's fundamental flaw was that it would have intentionally raised the cost of energy without regard to the impact on families and businesses." Harbert added, "To be clear, the U.S. Chamber of Commerce believes that the climate is changing, and that man is contributing to these changes. We also believe that technology and innovation, rather than sweeping federal mandates, offer the best approach for reducing greenhouse gas emissions and mitigating the impacts of climate change."

In November 2019, the U.S. Chamber adopted the following policy addressing climate change: "The climate is changing and humans are contributing to these changes. We believe that there is much common ground on which all sides of this discussion could come together to address climate change with policies that are practical, flexible, predictable, and durable. We believe in a policy approach that acknowledges the costs of action and inaction and the competitiveness of the U.S. economy." They recommended that the US rejoin the Paris Agreement and summarized that an effective climate policy should:

- Leverage the power of business (rely primarily on private sector)
- Maintain U.S. leadership in climate science
- Embrace technology and innovation
- Aggressively pursue greater energy efficiency
- Promote climate resilient infrastructure
- Support trade in U.S. technologies and products
- Encourage international cooperation

In 2019, the organization said it had no position on a carbon tax.

On January 19, 2021, the day before President Trump's term ended, the Chamber said it wanted Congress to pass "durable climate policy" while also encouraging "a market-based approach" to reduce greenhouse gas emissions.

=== Free trade ===
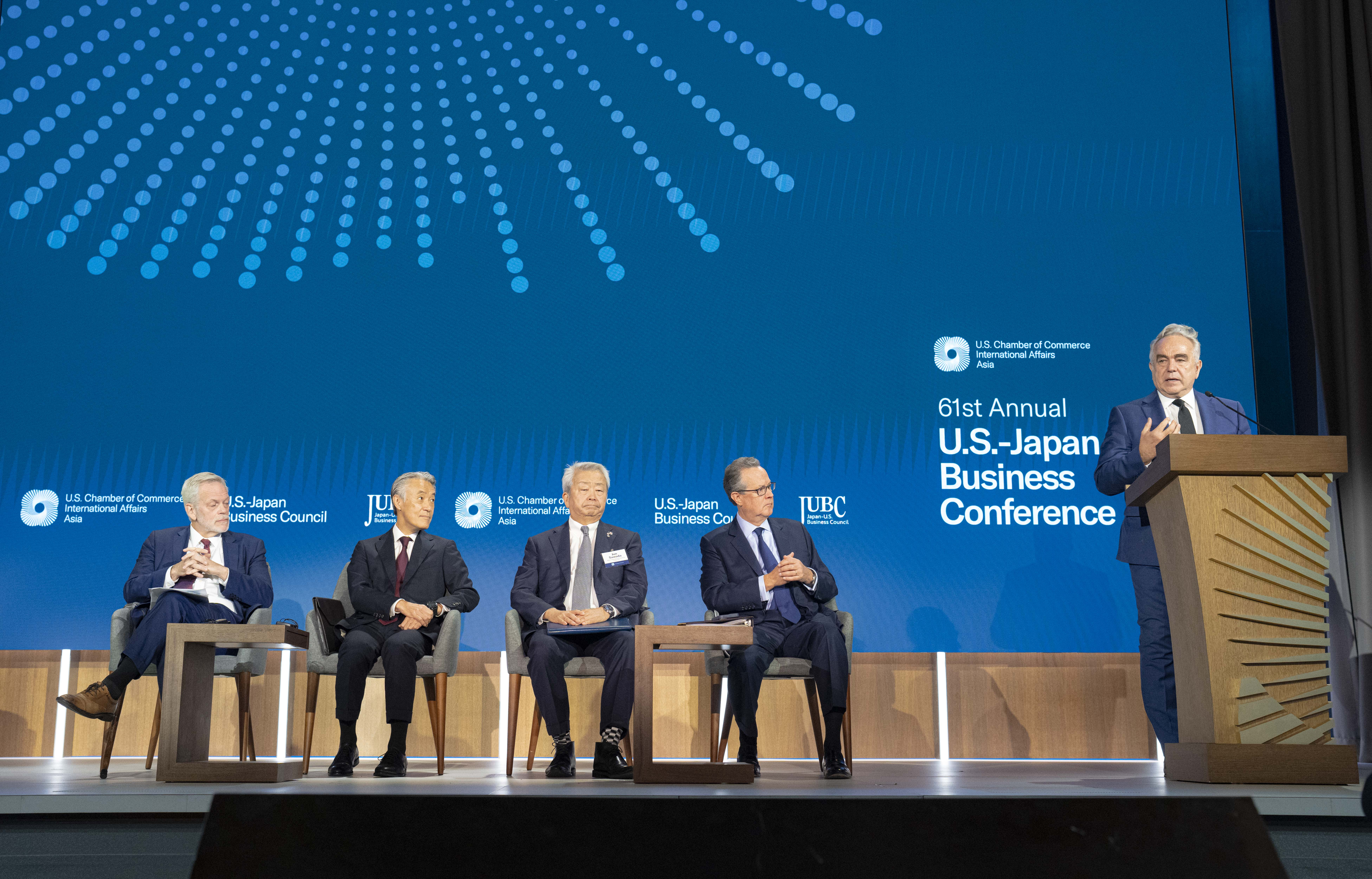
For many decades, the U.S.-Japan Business Conference has worked towards building strong relationships between the two countries, which is just one of the events that the chamber hosts to increase dialog between many countries.

The U.S. Chamber has supported free trade agreements in recent years, such as the North American Free Trade Agreement and Trans-Pacific Partnership. It has opposed President Donald Trump's protectionist policies. In February 2025, the Chamber called for an end to the tariffs proposed by Trump during his second term in office, citing harms to businesses, workers, and consumers.

=== Immigration reform ===
The U.S. Chamber opposed President Donald Trump's executive order ending the Deferred Action for Childhood Arrivals program. The U.S. Chamber's Chief Policy Officer Neil Bradley said, "With approximately 700,000 DACA recipients working for all sorts of businesses across the country, terminating their employment eligibility runs contrary to the president's goal of growing the U.S. economy."

The Chamber of Commerce has come under attack by populist conservatives and others for its support of "amnesty" for illegal immigrants. In 2014, Tom Donohue stated the Chamber will "pull out all stops" for the passage of immigration reform in Congress. According to The Washington Post, Donohue did not offer specifics with regard to provisions or bills on the matter, speaking generally about the impact that immigration reform would have on the U.S. economy.

In 2022, the Chamber of Commerce said it supported the doubling of legal immigration into the U.S. and a "permanent solution" for illegal immigrants who entered the U.S. as children. It said that these actions would reduce disruptions to supply chains and put a stop to increasing inflation rates.

=== Non-compete agreements ===
The Chamber of Commerce has lobbied against bans of non-compete agreements, as well as threatened to sue the Federal Trade Commission if it bans non-compete agreements. Non-compete agreements restrict the ability of workers to leave their jobs and work elsewhere or work independently. The Chamber has argued, "noncompete agreements are an important tool in fostering innovation and preserving competition."

== Lobbying expenditures ==
The Chamber ranked first in American lobbying expenditures each year from 2001 through 2019. As of 2022, the organization continues to be ranked first in cumulative, lobbying dollars (complete years beginning with 1998), surpassing the second-biggest spender, the National Association of Realtors, by more than $1 billion.

US Chamber Lobbying 2002-2022
Year	US Cham. Rank	US Cham. Spending	Next Highest Spender	Next Highest Amount
2022	2	$81,030,000	National Assn of Realtors	$81,738,132
2021	1	$66,410,000	National Assn of Realtors	$44,004,025
2020	2	$81,940,000	National Assn of Realtors	$84,113,368
2019	1	$77,245,000	National Assn of Realtors	$41,241,006
2018	1	$94,800,000	National Assn of Realtors	$72,808,648
2017	1	$82,260,000	National Assn of Realtors	$54,530,861
2016	1	$103,950,000	National Assn of Realtors	$64,821,111
2015	1	$64,190,000	American Medical Assn	$23,910,000
2014	1	$124,080,000	National Assn of Realtors	$55,057,053
2013	1	$74,470,000	National Assn of Realtors	$38,584,580
2012	1	$136,300,000	National Assn of Realtors	$41,464,580
2011	1	$66,370,000	General Electric	$26,340,000
2010	1	$157,187,500	PG&E Corp	$45,510,000
2009	1	$144,606,000	Exxon Mobil	$27,430,000
2008	1	$91,955,000	Exxon Mobil	$29,000,000
2007	1	$53,082,500	Pharmaceutical Rsrch & Mfrs of America	$22,733,400
2006	1	$72,995,000	AT&T Inc	$27,445,497
2005	1	$39,805,000	AARP	$36,302,064
2004	1	$53,380,000	American Medical Assn	$18,820,000
2003	1	$34,602,640	AARP	$20,880,000
2002	1	$41,560,000	Philip Morris	$15,200,000

== Organizational structure and membership ==
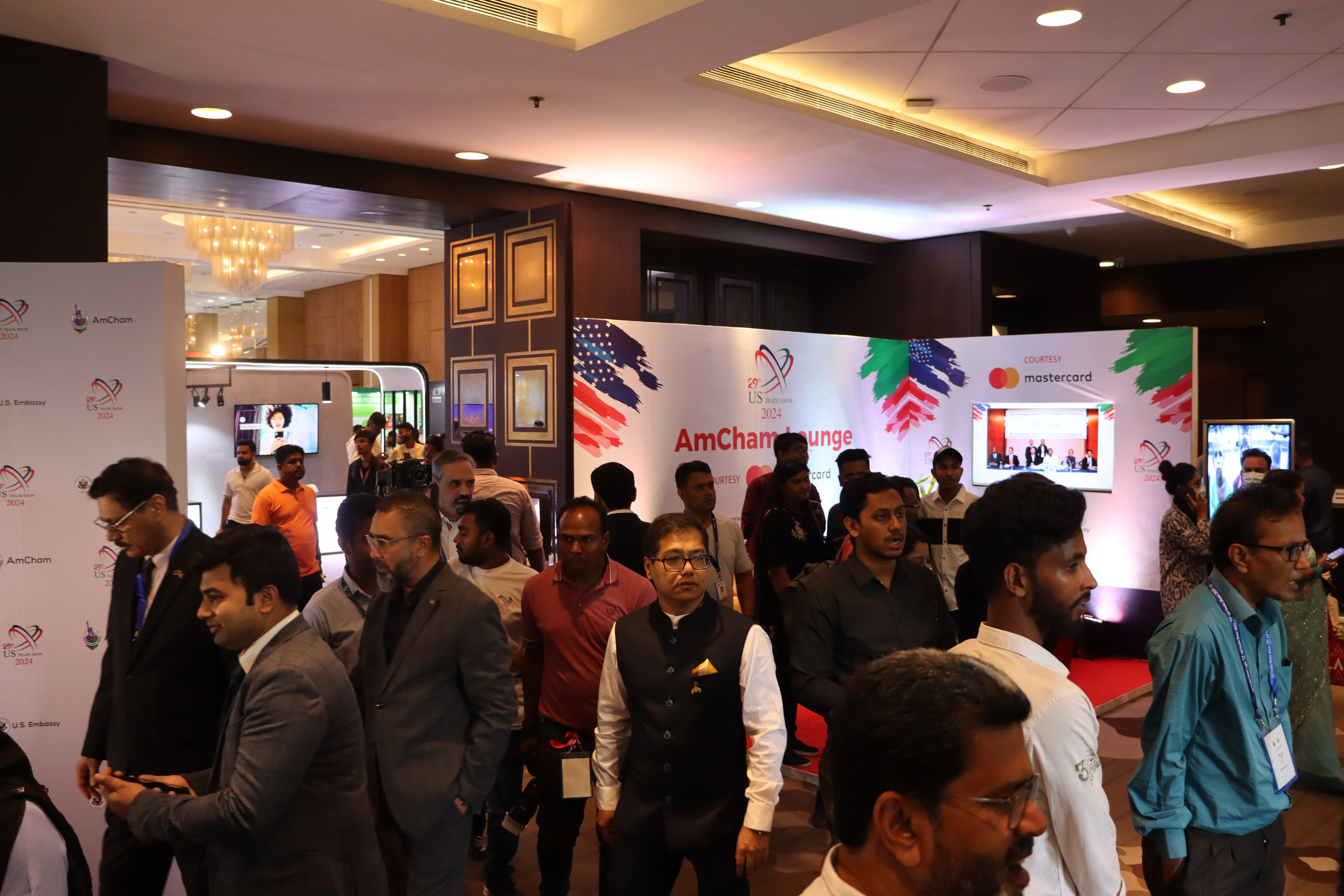
U.S. Trade Show event in Bangladesh through the chamber's AmCham network.

As of October 2010, the Chamber had a worldwide network of 115 American Chamber of Commerce affiliates located in 108 countries. The US Chamber says that a relative handful of the Chamber's 300,000 members are "non-U.S.-based (foreign) companies." It claims that, "No foreign money is used to fund political activities." A US Chamber executive has said that the organization has had "foreign multinationals" (foreign companies) as members for "over a century, many for decades." The US Chamber states that it receives approximately $100,000 annually in membership dues from its foreign affiliates, out of an annual budget of $200 million.

On its LinkedIn page the Chamber states: "The U.S. Chamber of Commerce is the world’s largest business organization representing the interests of more than three million businesses of every size, sector, and region." Likewise on its own Website it states: "For over 100 years, the U.S. Chamber of Commerce has represented the unified interests of the U.S. business community....the U.S. Chamber of Commerce is the world's largest business federation representing the interests of more than 3 million businesses of all sizes, sectors, and regions, as well as state and local chambers and industry associations."

=== Affiliate organizations ===
- Americans for Transportation Mobility
- Center for Capital Markets Competitiveness
- Center for International Private Enterprise
- Global Energy Institute
- Institute for Legal Reform
- Institute for Organization Management (IOM)
- U.S. Chamber Litigation Center
- U.S. Chamber of Commerce Foundation (previously the National Chamber Foundation)

=== Global Innovation Policy Center ===
The Global Innovation Policy Center (formerly the Global Intellectual Property Center, and commonly known as GIPC) is the principal institution of the Chamber of Commerce handling all issues relating to innovation and creativity through advocating for strong intellectual property standards. It aims to:

- strengthen the protection and enforcement of IP rights in the United States and abroad,
- promote and defend the system of IP rights and norms in the United States, key countries, and multilateral forums,
- increase support for IP rights as a driver of innovation and creativity.

The Global Innovation Policy Center was launched in October 2007 at the U.S. Chamber’s 4th Annual Anti-Counterfeiting and Piracy Summit. The GIPC was formed as an expansion of the existing efforts of the U.S. Chamber’s Global Anti-Counterfeiting and Piracy Initiative.

Leaders are, of have been:

- Thomas J. Donohue, President & CEO, U.S. Chamber of Commerce
- David Hirschmann, President & CEO, GIPC
- Patrick Kilbride, Senior Vice President, GIPC

== Opposition ==
Several organizations have attacked the Chamber for its advocacy, including Chamber Watch (a campaign of Public Citizen). Advocates for independent business, like the American Independent Business Alliance (AMIBA) and green businesses, like the American Sustainable Business Council, have fought the Chamber on multiple issues. Among major divisions between the Chamber and these business advocates is allowing corporations to engage in electioneering. Oliver E. Diaz Jr. says one example of this was when the Chamber spent $1,000,000+ to fund negative campaign ads against him and have judicial candidate Keith Starrett elected instead.

Some in the business community have criticized the Chamber's approach to public issues as overly aggressive. Hilary Rosen, former CEO of the Recording Industry Association of America, added that "Their aggressive ways are out of step with a new generation of business leadership who are looking for more cooperative relationship with Washington."

== See also ==
- National Federation of Independent Business
- U.S. Women's Chamber of Commerce
- United States Hispanic Chamber of Commerce
- Anthony D. Salzman

General:

- Advocacy group
- Lobbying in the United States
