= David G. Bradley =

American management consultant and publisher (born 1953)

David Bradley
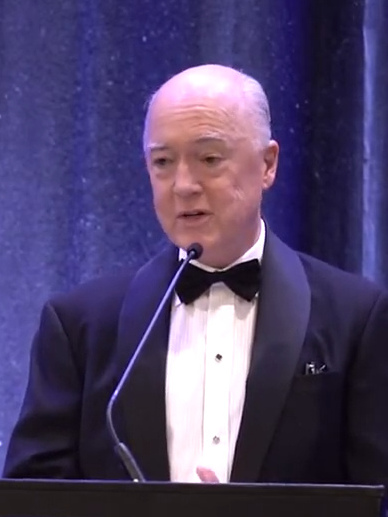
- Born: March 16, 1953 (age 73); Washington, D.C., U.S.
- Education: Swarthmore College (BA); Harvard Business School (MBA); Georgetown University Law Center (JD)

David G. Bradley (born March 6, 1953) is an American businessman and publisher, a partner in The Atlantic and Atlantic Media, and the owner of the National Journal Group. Before his career as a publisher, Bradley founded the Advisory Board Company and Corporate Executive Board, two consulting companies based in Washington, D.C.

== Early life and education ==
Bradley was born in Washington, D.C., and attended the Sidwell Friends School. His parents were devout Christian Scientists. As a youth he rode horses at Meadowbrook Stables, where he also worked as a groom, mucking out pony stalls. David was also a Comanchero at Sky Valley Ranch for Boys in Buena Vista, Colorado. He graduated from Swarthmore College and briefly interned in the White House during the presidency of Richard Nixon. He received a Master of Business Administration from Harvard Business School and was also a Fulbright Scholar in the Philippines. Bradley earned a J.D. from Georgetown University Law Center in 1983.

Bradley is brother to Barbara Bradley Hagerty, author and NPR religion correspondent.

== The Advisory Board Company ==
In 1979, at the age of 26, Bradley founded the Research Council of Washington, later renamed The Advisory Board Company. The initial purpose of the company was to do research on any question for any industry. In 1983, his company had begun advising other firms in the financial services industry. In 1986, the company began doing special research for the health care industry, which eventually became the company's main focus.

In 1997, the financial services and corporate practice of the Advisory Board was spun off as the Corporate Executive Board.

Both companies became publicly traded, with the Advisory Board on NASDAQ and CEB on NYSE, and later acquired by Optum and Gartner, respectively. Bradley reportedly earned more than $300 million from their sale.

== Publishing ==
In 1997, Bradley made his first acquisition as a publisher, purchasing the National Journal. He hired Michael Kelly, a well-known journalist who had just been fired from The New Republic after frequently clashing with owner Martin Peretz. Kelly was known for his controversial criticisms of Al Gore and Bill Clinton, but he got along well with Bradley.

In 1999, Bradley purchased The Atlantic from publisher and real estate tycoon Mort Zuckerman for $10 million. Bradley replaced editor William Whitworth with Kelly. Bradley's strategy to improve the business model of The Atlantic, which had lost money for years, was to focus on improving editorial quality. Bradley doubled the newsroom budget of The Atlantic, allowing the magazine to embark on a hiring spree, offering contracts to 25 new writers. Kelly's first hire was to bring back James Fallows, one of the magazine's best-known journalists, who had been hired away in 1996. After vowing not to move The Atlantic from its home in Boston, Bradley moved its offices in 2005 to Washington, where his other enterprises are headquartered. This drew the resignations of several prominent members of The Atlantic, including editor Cullen Murphy, who later rejoined The Atlantic.

Bradley is also known for the great lengths he will go to in order to lure writers to The Atlantic. To hire Jeffrey Goldberg, a staff writer for The New Yorker, Bradley brought ponies to Goldberg's house to show Goldberg's three young children.

In 2012, Bradley launched Quartz, a business-news publication aimed at mobile-device users; he sold it in 2018 to Uzabase, a Japanese media company, for between $75 and $110 million.

In 2011, Bradley led a team of researchers and journalists looking for freelance reporter Clare Gillis, who had been captured by Libyan soldiers loyal to Muammar Qaddafi. The team found Gillis in a women's prison in Tripoli and used a network of contacts to arrange her release. When Gillis was set free, Qaddafi also released three other journalists, including American James Foley.

In 2012, Foley was taken hostage again, this time in Syria. Bradley led a second team of researchers to locate Foley and five other Americans taken hostage in Syria. Larry Wright wrote an article about a dinner at Bradley's house during which the families of five of the missing hostages met for the first time. In the end, the team failed to gain release for four of the hostages held by ISIS. In August 2012, Foley became the first American beheaded by ISIS. In the end, all four ISIS hostages were killed or died in custody. One hostage, Theo Padnos, held by al-Nusra, was released. The sixth hostage, Austin Tice, still is missing in Syria. To avoid a conflict of interest, Bradley directed Wright to publish the story in The Atlantic's competitor, The New Yorker.

On July 28, 2017, Bradley sold his majority ownership of The Atlantic to the Emerson Collective, which is an organization owned by multi-billionaire investor and philanthropist Laurene Powell Jobs. Bradley remains chairman emeritus and a minority owner.

== Politics ==
Politically, Bradley considers himself a centrist. He has contributed to the Democratic and Republican parties. In the 2008 U.S. presidential primaries he donated to Hillary Clinton, Barack Obama, and Mitt Romney.

== Boards and philanthropy ==
In addition to publishing, Bradley works with various educational and charitable organizations. He founded the Child Protection Network, the largest system of acute care facilities for abused children in the Philippines. The network now includes emergency centers in over 100 Philippine hospitals. During his Fulbright Scholarship, Bradley taught economics at the University of the City of Manila (Pamantasan ng Lungsod ng Maynila).

Bradley is a member of the American Academy of Arts and Sciences. His board memberships have included the Council on Foreign Relations, Georgetown University, the American University of Beirut, Swarthmore College, New America Foundation, KIPP DC, and the Biden Cancer Initiative.
