= Thomas J. Donohue =

American business executive (1938–2024)

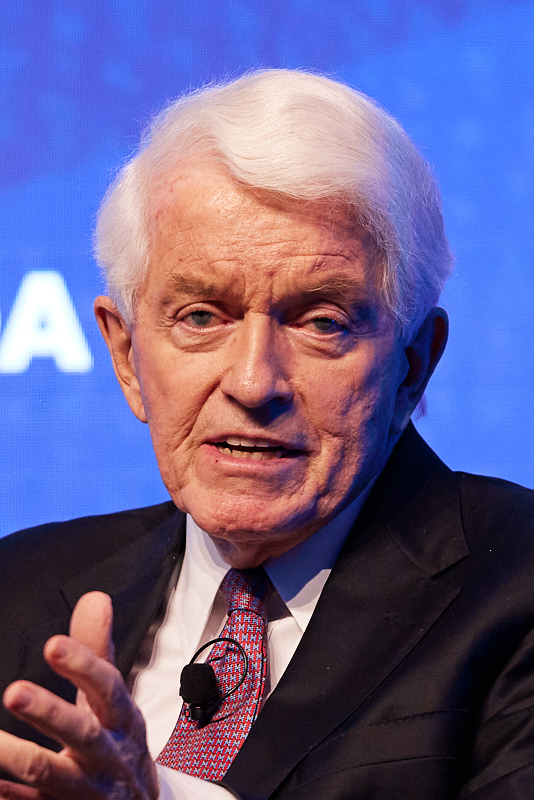
- Donohue in 2023
- Born: Thomas Joseph Donohue; August 12, 1938; New York City, U.S.
- Died: October 14, 2024 (aged 86); Arlington, Virginia, U.S.
- Education: St. John's University (BA); Adelphi University (MA)
- Occupation: Business executive
- Title: President and CEO of U.S. Chamber of Commerce
- Term: 1997–2019 (as President); 1997–2021 (as CEO)
- Predecessor: Richard L. Lesher
- Successor: Suzanne P. Clark
- Spouse: Elizabeth Schulz (m. 1963; died 2017)
- Children: 3

Thomas Joseph Donohue Sr. (August 12, 1938 – October 14, 2024) was an American business executive. He served as the president and CEO of the United States Chamber of Commerce located in Washington, D.C. from 1997 to 2021. During his leadership of the U.S. Chamber of Commerce, Donohue established the U.S. Chamber Institute for Legal Reform and was president of the National Chamber Foundation. Before his leadership at the U.S. Chamber of Commerce, Donohue was president and CEO of the American Trucking Association.

== Early life ==
Thomas Joseph Donohue was born in Brooklyn, New York on August 12, 1938 to a production manager at the American Can Company, and was of Irish descent. He was raised in Rockville Centre on Long Island. He studied at St. John's University, before pursuing a Master of Arts in Business at Adelphi University (1965). He worked his way through college as a union truck driver before working as a fundraiser for the Boy Scouts of America and the National Center for Disability Services.

== Career ==
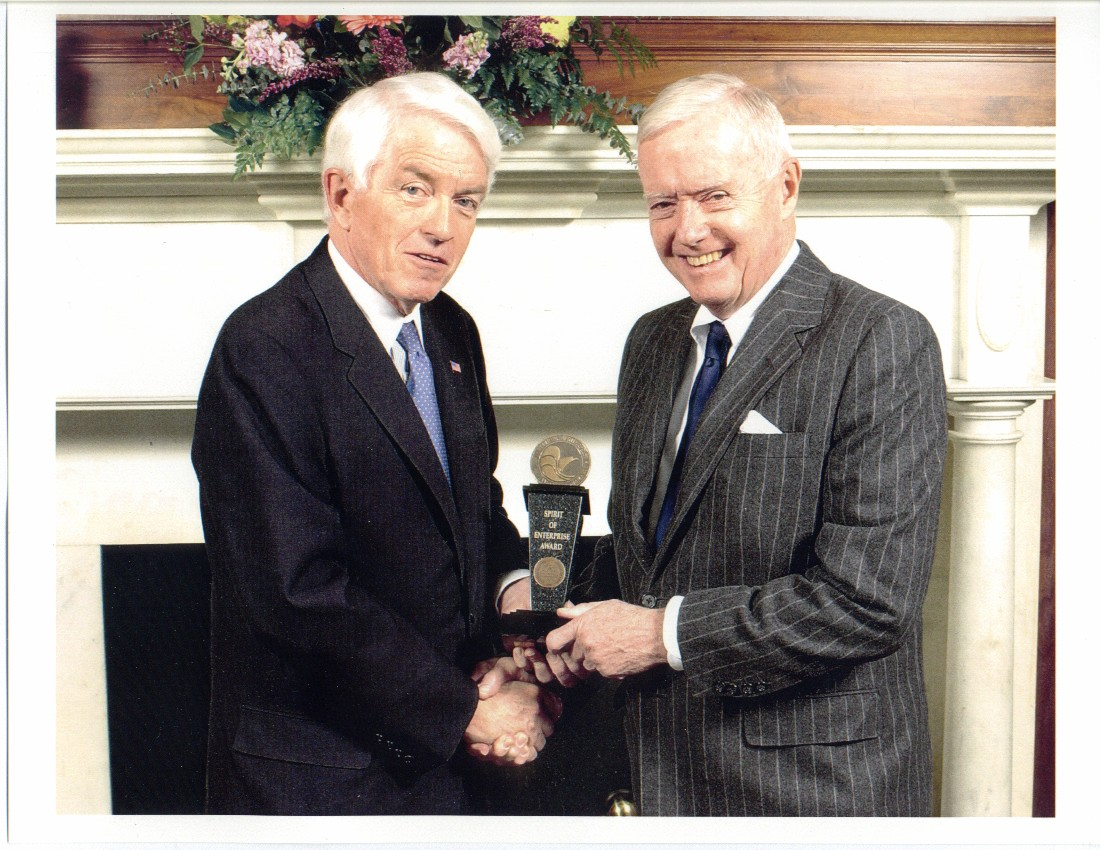
Donohue with Congressman Amo Houghton in 2004

Donohue worked as an administrator at Fairfield University and as a trustee at Marymount University. From 1969 to 1976, he was the US Official Deputy Assistant Postmaster General, where he helped "convert" the Post Office from a government department into the quasi-private U.S. Postal Service.

In 1976, he joined the US Chamber of Commerce development department under its president, Richard Lesher. By 1978, his role included running "a grassroots political apparatus" and "relations with the White House and Congress".

In 1984, he left to become president and CEO of the American Trucking Association, "quickly turning what was a moribund also-ran into a Washington powerhouse" according to the Washington Monthly. In 1997 he returned to the chamber as its president.

Donohue was an Emeritus Hudson Institute Trustee and has served on the board of directors of Qwest, Sunrise Assisted Living Corporation, Union Pacific, and XM.

In July 2022, Donohue helped found a group of U.S. business and policy leaders who share the goal of constructively engaging with China in order to improve U.S.-China relations.

=== Chamber of Commerce ===
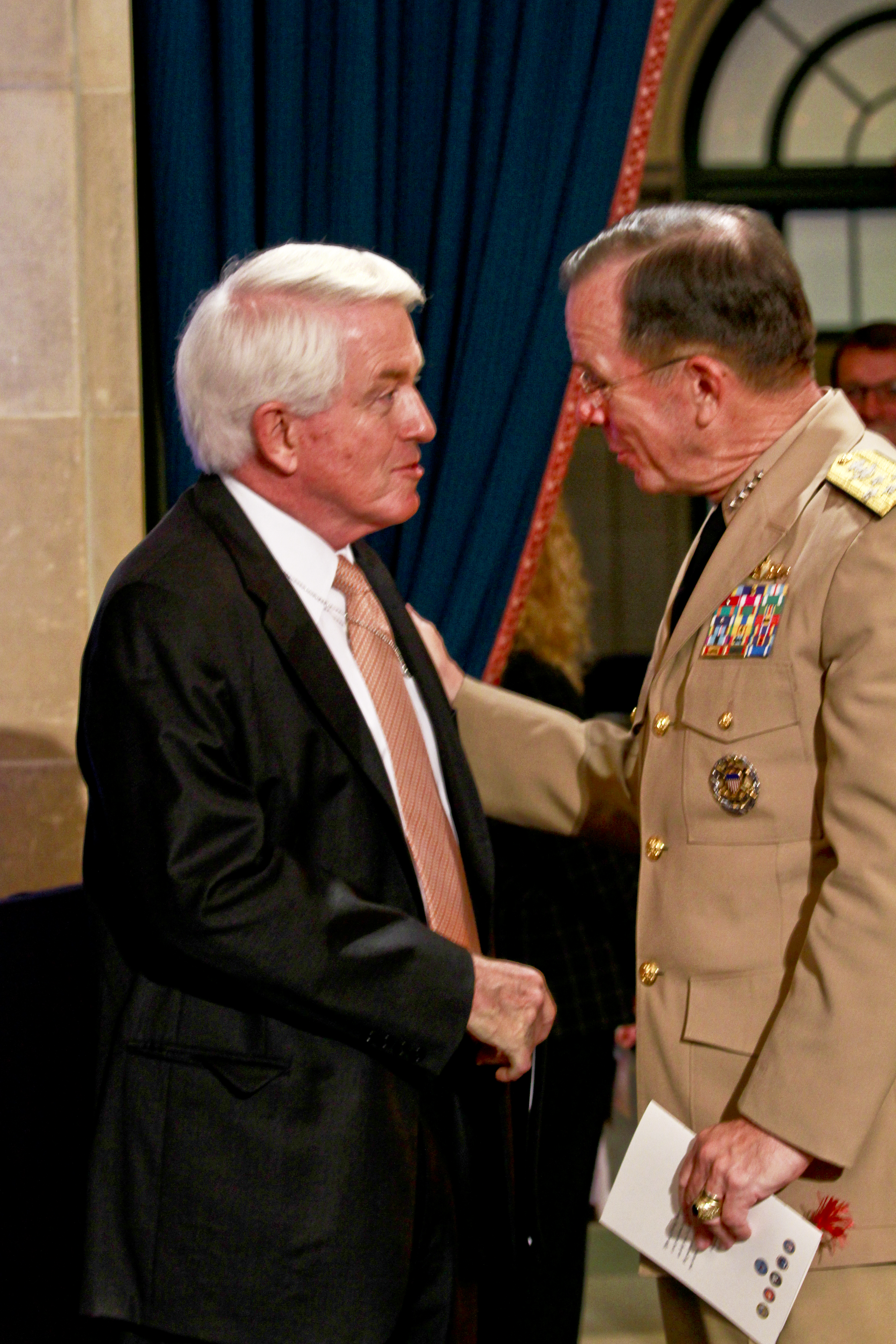
Donohue (left) with Navy Admiral Michael Mullen in June 2011.

In 1997, Donohue assumed the role of president and CEO of the U.S. Chamber of Commerce, replacing Richard Lesher. Under Lesher, the Chamber had endorsed the Clinton health care plan of 1993, angering many conservatives. Congressman John Boehner led a campaign pushing companies to leave the Chamber over its support of the bill. When Donohue took over, the Chamber's power was considered to be at a low ebb. The Washington Post wrote, "Nobody has mastered this new Washington game better than Thomas J. Donohue." According to The Wall Street Journal, "[Donohue's] most striking innovation has been to offer individual companies and industries the chance to use the chamber as a means of anonymously pursuing their own political ends."

Donohue established the U.S. Chamber Institute for Legal Reform, which has won significant cases in the courts, at the state and federal levels, and in elections for state attorneys general and Supreme Court judges. Donohue was president of the National Chamber Foundation as well as the Center for International Private Enterprise, a core institution of the National Endowment for Democracy.

In 2014, Donohue said that if the Republicans did not change their immigration policies then they "shouldn't bother to run a candidate in 2016". During his final years at the U.S. Chamber of Commerce, he often clashed with President Donald Trump over his administration's trade and immigration policies.

Donohue resigned as president of the U.S. Chamber of Commerce in 2019. He would then retire as CEO in 2021 with Suzanne P. Clark succeeding him as both CEO and President.

== Personal life and death ==
In 1963, Donohue married Elizabeth Schulz in Bayside, New York. They met while attending St. John's together. They had three sons: Thomas Jr., Keith and John. Schulz died of cancer in July 2017.

Donohue died from congestive heart failure at his home in Arlington, Virginia on October 14, 2024, at the age of 86.

== Honors ==
Donohue was the 2013 recipient of the Horatio Alger Award. In April 2016, he received a Lifetime Achievement Award from the Boy Scouts of America's National Capital Area Council.

- Grand Cordon of the Order of the Rising Sun: 2018
