= William Whitworth (journalist) =

American journalist and editor (1937–2024)

- Born: William Alvin Whitworth; February 13, 1937; Hot Springs, Arkansas, U.S.
- Died: March 8, 2024 (aged 87); Conway, Arkansas, U.S.
- Education: University of Oklahoma
- Occupations: Journalist, Writer, Editor
- Writing career
- Years active: 1960–1999
- Genre: Journalism

William Alvin Whitworth (February 13, 1937 – March 8, 2024) was an American journalist and editor. He worked as a reporter for the New York Herald Tribune from 1963 to 1966, columnist and associate editor for The New Yorker from 1966 to 1980, and editor in chief of The Atlantic from 1981 to 1999.

== Life and career ==
Born in Hot Springs, Arkansas, he grew up in Little Rock. His mother was a porcelain and silver buyer for a jeweler there; his father worked in advertising. In 1960, on completion of his BA in English/Journalism at the University of Oklahoma (where he wrote for the student newspaper), Whitworth began work at the Arkansas Gazette where he covered low-level community and political stories. After 4 years at the Gazette, he moved to New York to work as a reporter for the New York Herald Tribune from 1963 to 1966, covering the political turmoil of the 1960s beginning with the Kennedy assassination, and including the student antiwar movement, Harlem riots, and Bobby Kennedy's U.S. Senate race. He also reported on entertainment stories, including the Beatles' first two U.S. appearances.

From 1966 to 1980, he was hired by William Shawn as a columnist for The New Yorker, writing celebrity features, and reporting other entertaining subjects, including making regular contributions to the "Talk of the Town" section. He also wrote a long, detailed piece about an interview he conducted with Eugene V. Rostow regarding the strategy, values and purposes of the Vietnam War, which he expanded into a book, Naïve Questions About War and Peace.

Whitworth began his editing career at The New Yorker, working with such other columnists as Pauline Kael, and writers of contributed pieces. In a 2011 interview with Marc Smirnoff of The Oxford American, he said that one of his most challenging writers was journalist Robert Caro, whose book The Power Broker was excerpted in the New Yorker in four installments in 1974. The excerpts differ from the version published in the book, as noted by Charles McGrath in a 2012 New York Times profile of Caro:

the magazine version ... differs from the original and changes Caro's punctuation and paragraphing. The New Yorker series is a very readable redaction of the original — and without sacrificing much essential information, easier on the attention span than the book, which requires an immense time commitment — but for better or worse, it’s not as full-throated as the original.

When Mort Zuckerman bought The Atlantic in 1981, he made Whitworth editor in chief of the monthly magazine. Whitworth spent almost two decades leading the magazine to numerous awards and commendations.

After his retirement in 1999, he continued to edit occasional pieces, and he also took on assignments as a book editor.

Whitworth died in Conway, Arkansas, on March 8, 2024, at the age of 87.
