= Atlantic Media =

American print and online media company

Atlantic Media, Inc.
- Founded: May 6, 1997; 29 years ago
- Country of origin: United States
- Headquarters location: Watergate complex, Washington, D.C., U.S.
- Key people: David G. Bradley (Chairman); Michael Finnegan (President); Kevin Turpin (President – National Journal)
- Publication types: The Atlantic (minority ownership); National Journal
- No. of employees: 700+
- Official website: www.atlanticmedia.com

Atlantic Media, Inc. is an American print and online media company owned by David G. Bradley and based in the Watergate complex in Washington, D.C. It held numerous publications and businesses. Since 2020, it holds a minority stake in The Atlantic, a print and online publication that also holds themed events, and offers business intelligence and consulting services through its National Journal Group subsidiary.

Founded in 1997 when Bradley purchased the National Journal Group, the company expanded for three decades by launching several new publications and acquiring others. It began to slim down in 2017 when Bradley sold a majority stake in The Atlantic to Emerson Collective, and continued by selling Quartz in 2018, CityLab in 2019, and the Government Executive Media Group subsidiary with its four publications and websites in 2020.

== History ==
=== 20th century ===
Bradley began his foray into publishing in 1997 by purchasing the National Journal Group, which published National Journal, The Hotline, National Journal Daily (previously known as Congress Daily), and Technology Daily. The group also published books and directories, including the biennial Almanac of American Politics.

=== 21st century ===
In 2000, he acquired The Atlantic. After first vowing to leave the magazine in Boston, he moved the headquarters to Washington, D.C., in 2005.

He also acquired Government Executive, which later created Nextgov, aimed at government leaders in IT; Defense One, aimed at national security leaders; and Route Fifty, aimed at leaders in state and local governments.

In 2012, the company launched Quartz, one of the first websites designed from the start to serve mobile readers.

On July 28, 2017, The Atlantic announced that Bradley had sold majority ownership of the publication to Laurene Powell Jobs, the widow of former Apple Inc. chairman and CEO Steve Jobs, through her Emerson Collective organization. The Washington Post reported that Emerson Collective planned to move to full ownership in "three to five years".

In 2018, Bradley sold Quartz to Uzabase, a Japanese financial publisher, in a deal that valued the publication up to $110M.

In December 2019, Bradley sold Citylab for an undisclosed sum to Bloomberg L.P.

In March 2020, Bradley sold Government Executive Media Group, including its publications Government Executive, Nextgov, Defense One, and Route Fifty, for an undisclosed sum to Growth Catalyst Partners, a private equity firm based in Chicago.

== See also ==
- Michael Kelly Award
