= Francis H. Underwood =

American editor and writer (1825–1894)

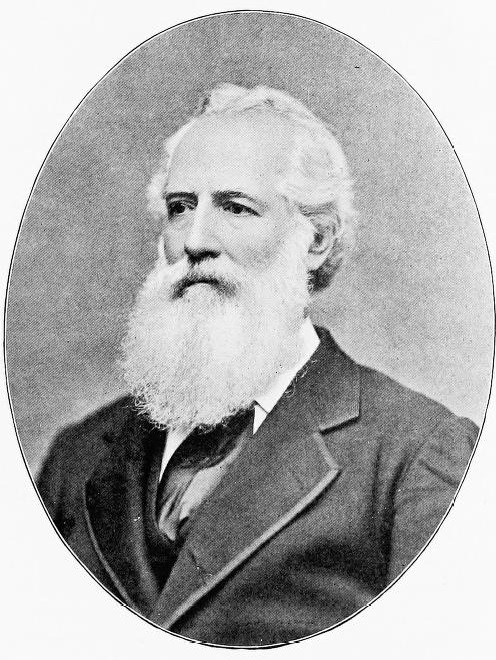
- Underwood in 1903
- Born: Francis Henry Underwood; January 12, 1825; Enfield, Massachusetts, U.S.
- Died: August 7, 1894 (aged 69); Edinburgh, Scotland
- Occupations: Editor; writer
- Parent(s): Roswell Underwood; Phoebe Hall

Francis Henry Underwood (January 12, 1825 – August 7, 1894) was an American editor and writer. He was the founder and first associate editor of The Atlantic Monthly in 1857 while still working as a publisher's assistant.

== Biography ==
Underwood was born on January 12, 1825, in Enfield, Massachusetts, the son of Phoebe (Hall) and Roswell Underwood.

Underwood worked in Kentucky from 1845 to 1850, but his hatred of slavery caused him to quit the state. He became an ardent supporter of the Free Soil Party. Originally, he planned to launch a Free-soil magazine in 1853, but the idea did not come to fruition until The Atlantic Monthly in 1857.

Underwood traveled to Britain in August 1885 on SS Cephalonia. He arrived in Liverpool and then traveled by railway to Glasgow.

In 1885, Underwood was appointed American Consul at Glasgow in Scotland. In 1893, he was Consul for Leith. He is noted as being a member of Edinburgh's "Pen and Pencil Club".

He lived at 35 Mansionhouse Road in the Grange, Edinburgh.

He died in Edinburgh on August 7, 1894.

== Works ==
- Cloud Pictures, a novel
- Hand-books of English Literature
- Builders of American Literature
- Lord of Himself
- Man Proposes
- Dr. Gray's Quest
- Quabbin: the Story of a Small Town with Outlooks Upon Puritan Life
- Biographies of Lowell, Longfellow, and Whittier
