= The Atlantic =

American magazine and publisher

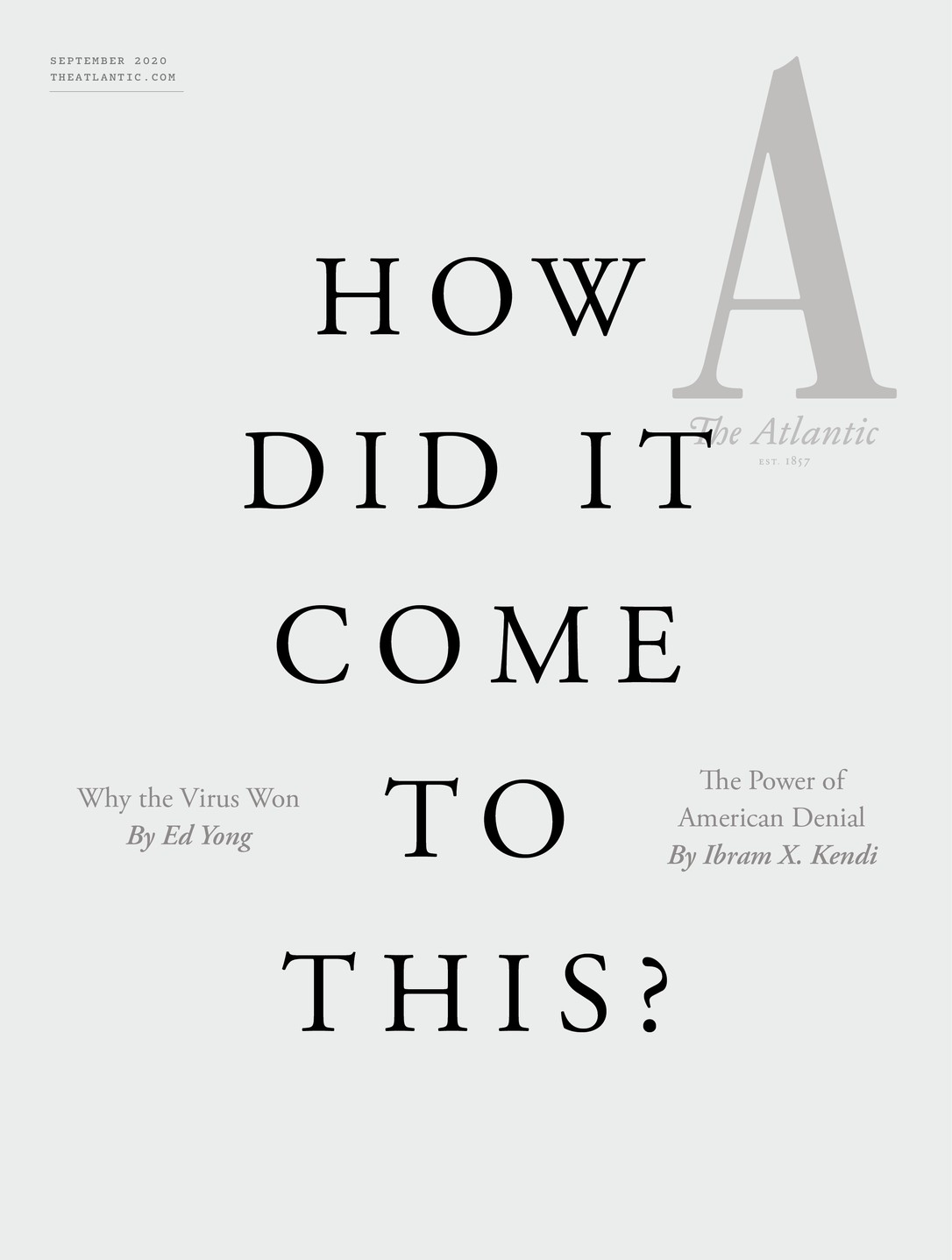
- Cover of the September 2020 issue
- Editor-in-chief: Jeffrey Goldberg
- Former editors: James Bennet
- Categories: Literature; political science; foreign affairs; lifestyle
- Frequency: Monthly (1857–2000; since 2025); 11 issues a year (2001–2002); 10 issues a year (2003–2024)
- Publisher: Laurene Powell Jobs
- Total circulation: 1,107,293 (2024)
- Founder: Moses Dresser Phillips; Francis H. Underwood; Ralph Waldo Emerson; Henry Wadsworth Longfellow
- Founded: 1857; 169 years ago
- First issue: November 1, 1857; 169 years ago (as The Atlantic Monthly)
- Company: Emerson Collective
- Country: United States
- Based in: Boston, Massachusetts, U.S. (until 2005); Washington, D.C., U.S. (since 2005)
- Language: English
- Website: theatlantic.com
- ISSN: 1072-7825 (print); 2151-9463 (web)
- OCLC: 936540106

The Atlantic is an American magazine and multi-platform publisher based in Washington, D.C. Founded in 1857 in Boston as The Atlantic Monthly, it began as a literary and cultural magazine that published leading writers' commentary on education, the abolition of slavery, and other major political issues of that time. Today it features articles on politics, foreign affairs, business and the economy, culture and the arts, technology, and science.

The magazine was published monthly until 2001, when 11 issues were produced; since 2003, it has published 10 per year. It dropped "Monthly" from the cover with the January/February 2004 issue, and officially changed the name in 2007. In 2024, it announced that it would resume publishing monthly issues in 2025. As of 2024, the website's executive editor is Adrienne LaFrance, the editor-in-chief is Jeffrey Goldberg, and the CEO is Nicholas Thompson.

The magazine was purchased in 1999 by businessman David G. Bradley, who fashioned it into a general editorial magazine primarily aimed at serious national readers and "thought leaders"; in 2017, he sold a majority interest in the publication to Laurene Powell Jobs's Emerson Collective. In 2024, it was reported that the magazine had crossed one million subscribers and become profitable, three years after losing $20 million in a single year.

== History ==
=== Founding and initial growth ===
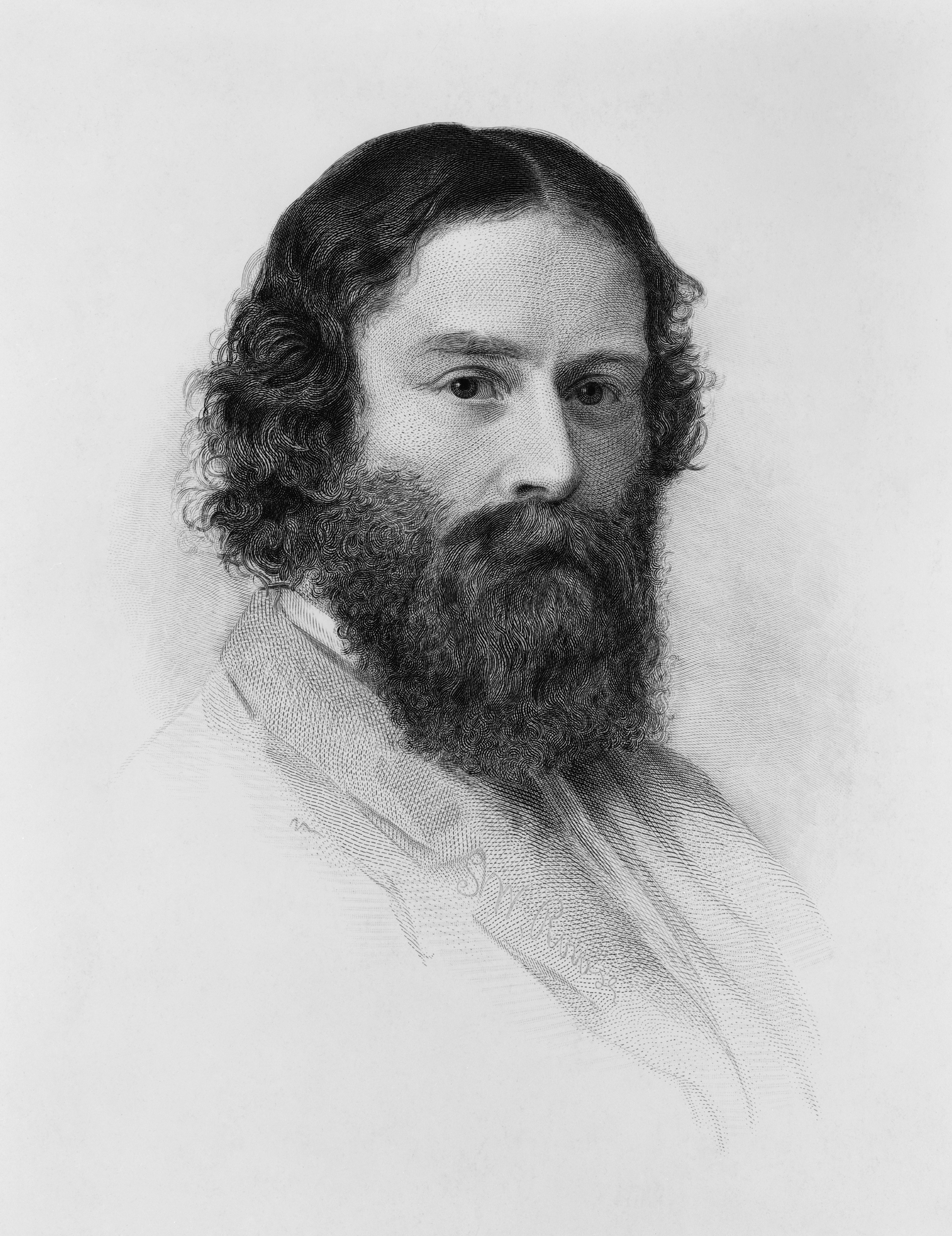
James Russell Lowell, the first editor of The Atlantic

In the autumn of 1857, Moses Dresser Phillips, a publisher from Boston, created The Atlantic Monthly. The plan for the magazine was launched at a dinner party at the Parker House Hotel in Boston, which was described in a letter by Phillips:

I must tell you about a little dinner-party I gave about two weeks ago. It would be proper, perhaps, to state the origin of it was a desire to confer with my literary friends on a somewhat extensive literary project, the particulars of which I shall reserve till you come. But to the Party: My invitations included only R. W. Emerson, H. W. Longfellow, J. R. Lowell, Mr. Motley (the 'Dutch Republic' man), O. W. Holmes, Mr. Cabot, and Mr. Underwood, our literary man. Imagine your uncle as the head of such a table, with such guests. The above named were the only ones invited, and they were all present. We sat down at three P.M., and rose at eight. The time occupied was longer by about four hours and thirty minutes than I am in the habit of consuming in that kind of occupation, but it was the richest time intellectually by all odds that I have ever had. Leaving myself and 'literary man' out of the group, I think you will agree with me that it would be difficult to duplicate that number of such conceded scholarship in the whole country besides... Each one is known alike on both sides of the Atlantic, and is read beyond the limits of the English language.

At that dinner he announced his idea for the magazine:

Mr. Cabot is much wiser than I am. Dr. Holmes can write funnier verses than I can. Mr. Motley can write history better than I. Mr. Emerson is a philosopher and I am not. Mr. Lowell knows more of the old poets than I. But none of you knows the American people as well as I do.

The magazine's founders included Francis H. Underwood and prominent writers Ralph Waldo Emerson, Oliver Wendell Holmes Sr., Henry Wadsworth Longfellow, Harriet Beecher Stowe, and John Greenleaf Whittier. James Russell Lowell was its first editor. Stowe was invited to the dinner party but declined because it served alcohol; nevertheless she signed the manifesto that set out the goals of the paper along with Herman Melville and Nathaniel Hawthorne, and The Atlantic today credits her as one of its founders.

The Atlantic's first issue was published in November 1857. By its third year, it was published by Boston publishing house Ticknor and Fields, which later became part of Houghton Mifflin. In 1878, the magazine absorbed The Galaxy, a competitor monthly magazine founded a dozen years previously by William Conant Church and his brother Francis P. Church; it had published works by Mark Twain, Walt Whitman, Ion Hanford Perdicaris and Henry James. In 1879, The Atlantic had offices in Winthrop Square in Boston and at 21 Astor Place in New York City. During the 19th and 20th centuries, the magazine also published the annual The Atlantic Monthly Almanac.

=== 20th century ===
The magazine was purchased in 1908 by then-editor Ellery Sedgwick and remained in Boston. The Atlantic Monthly Press was founded in 1917; for many years, it was operated in partnership with Little, Brown and Company. Its published books included Drums Along the Mohawk (1936) and Blue Highways (1982). The press was sold in 1986; today it is an imprint of Grove Atlantic.

In 1980, the magazine was acquired by Mortimer Zuckerman, property magnate and founder of Boston Properties, who became its chairman. On September 27, 1999, Zuckerman transferred ownership of the magazine to David G. Bradley, owner of the National Journal Group, which focused on Washington, D.C., and federal government news. Bradley had promised that the magazine would stay in Boston for the foreseeable future, as it did for the next five-and-a-half years.

=== 21st century ===
In April 2005, the publishers announced that the editorial offices would be moved from their longtime home at 77 North Washington Street in Boston to join the company's advertising and circulation divisions in Washington, D.C. Later in August, Bradley told The New York Observer that the move was not made to save money—near-term savings would be $200,000–$300,000, a relatively small amount that would be swallowed by severance-related spending—but instead would serve to create a hub in Washington, D.C., where the top minds from all of Bradley's publications could collaborate under the Atlantic Media Company umbrella. Few of the Boston staff agreed to move, and Bradley then commenced an open search for a new editorial staff.

In 2006, Bradley hired James Bennet, the Jerusalem bureau chief for The New York Times, as editor-in-chief. Bradley also hired Jeffrey Goldberg and Andrew Sullivan as writers for the magazine. In 2008, Jay Lauf joined the organization as publisher and vice-president; as of 2017, he was publisher and president of Quartz. In early 2014, Bennet and Bob Cohn became co-presidents of The Atlantic, and Cohn became the publication's sole president in March 2016 when Bennet was tapped to lead The New York Times's editorial page. Jeffrey Goldberg was named editor-in-chief in October 2016.

On July 28, 2017, The Atlantic announced that Laurene Powell Jobs had acquired majority ownership through her Emerson Collective organization, with a staff member of Emerson Collective, Peter Lattman, being immediately named as vice chairman of The Atlantic. David G. Bradley and Atlantic Media retained a minority share position in this sale. In May 2019, technology journalist Adrienne LaFrance became executive editor. In December 2020, former Wired editor-in-chief Nicholas Thompson was named CEO.

In 2022, The Atlantic moved its offices to The Wharf in Washington, D.C.'s Southwest Waterfront neighborhood.

== Literary and editorial legacy ==
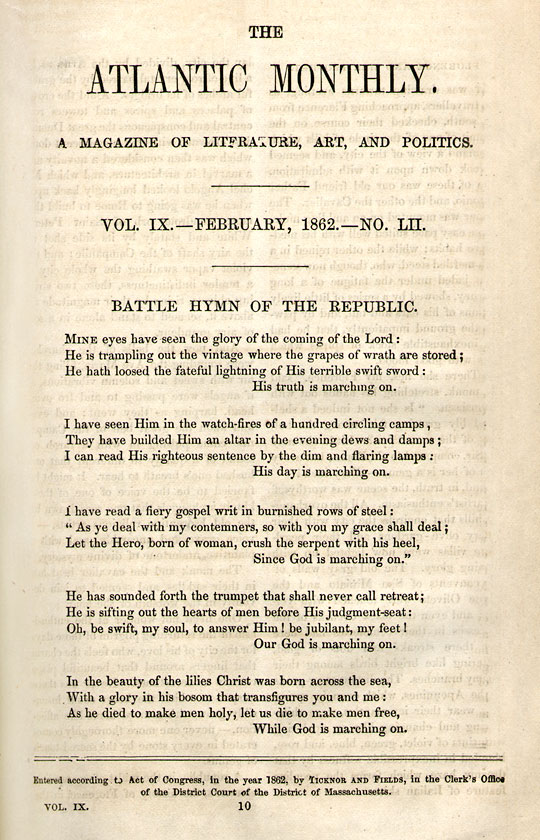
In February 1862, The Atlantic was first to publish the "Battle Hymn of the Republic".

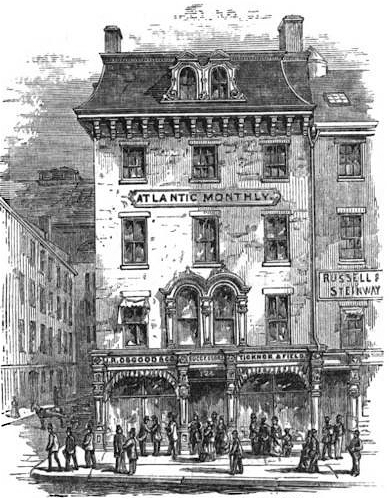
The magazine's office Ticknor & Fields at 124 Tremont Street in Boston, c. 1868

=== Landmark publications ===
A leading literary magazine, The Atlantic has published many significant works and authors. It was the first to publish pieces by the abolitionists Julia Ward Howe ("Battle Hymn of the Republic" on February 1, 1862), and William Parker, whose slave narrative "The Freedman's Story" was published in February and March 1866. It also published Charles W. Eliot's "The New Education", a call for practical reform that led to his appointment to the presidency of Harvard University in 1869. The magazine published works by Charles Chesnutt before he collected them in The Conjure Woman (1899).

The magazine has published speculative articles that inspired the development of new technologies. The classic example is Vannevar Bush's essay "As We May Think" (July 1945), which inspired Douglas Engelbart and later Ted Nelson to develop the modern workstation and hypertext technology.

Editors have recognized major cultural changes and movements. For example, of the emerging writers of the 1920s, Ernest Hemingway had his short story "Fifty Grand" published in the July 1927 edition. Harking back to its abolitionist roots, in its August 1963 edition, at the height of the civil rights movement, the magazine published Martin Luther King Jr.'s defense of civil disobedience, "Letter from Birmingham Jail", under the headline "The Negro Is Your Brother".

=== 21st century influence ===
The Atlantic has emerged in the 21st century as an influential platform for longform storytelling and newsmaker interviews. Influential cover stories have included Anne Marie Slaughter's "Why Women Still Can't Have It All" (2012) and Ta-Nehisi Coates's "A Case for Reparations" (2014). In 2015, Jeffrey Goldberg's "Obama Doctrine" was widely discussed by American media and prompted response by many world leaders.

On August 2, 2023, it was announced that Jeffrey Goldberg, who had served as editor-in-chief of The Atlantic since 2016, had been named as the tenth moderator of the PBS news program, Washington Week, and that the politics and culture publication would also enter into an editorial partnership with the television program – which was retitled accordingly as Washington Week with The Atlantic – similar to the earlier collaboration with the National Journal. The first episode under the longer title, with Goldberg as moderator, was broadcast on August 11, 2023.

As of 2022, writers and frequent contributors to the print magazine included James Fallows, Jeffrey Goldberg, Ta-Nehisi Coates, Caitlin Flanagan, Jonathan Rauch, McKay Coppins, Gillian White, Adrienne LaFrance, Vann R. Newkirk II, Derek Thompson, David Frum, Jennifer Senior, George Packer, Ed Yong, and James Parker.

=== U.S. presidential endorsements ===
The Atlantic has rarely endorsed presidential candidates, doing so only five times in its history - including all three elections involving Donald Trump :

- In 1860, three years into publication, The Atlantic's then-editor James Russell Lowell endorsed Republican Abraham Lincoln for his first run for president and also endorsed the abolition of slavery.
- In 1964, Edward Weeks wrote on behalf of the editorial board in endorsing Democratic President Lyndon B. Johnson and rebuking Republican Barry Goldwater's candidacy.
- In 2016, the editorial board urged readers to support Democratic nominee Hillary Clinton in a rebuke of Republican Donald Trump's candidacy.
- In 2020, The Atlantic endorsed the Democratic presidential nominee Joe Biden in the 2020 presidential election, and urged its readers to oppose Trump's re-election bid.
- In early 2024, The Atlantic published a special 24-article issue titled "If Trump Wins," warning about a potential second term for Trump being worse than his first. In October, the publication endorsed Democratic nominee Kamala Harris in her presidential bid against Trump in the 2024 election.

After Trump prevailed in the November 2016 election, the magazine became a strong critic of his. In March 2019, a cover article by editor Yoni Appelbaum called for the impeachment of Donald Trump: "It's time for Congress to judge the president's fitness to serve." In September 2020, it published a story, citing several anonymous sources, reporting that Trump referred to dead American soldiers as "losers". Trump called it a "fake story", and suggested the magazine would soon be out of business.

== Reception ==
=== Audience ===
According to a 2025 Pew Research Center study on educational differences among audiences of 30 major U.S. news outlets, The Atlantic had the highest proportion of college-educated readers, with 62% of its audience holding at least a bachelor's degree.

=== Awards and recognition ===
In 2005, the magazine won a National Magazine Award for fiction.

In June 2006, the Chicago Tribune named The Atlantic one of the top ten English-language magazines, describing it as the "150-year-old granddaddy of periodicals" because "it keeps us smart and in the know" with cover stories on the then-forthcoming fight over Roe v. Wade. It also lauded regular features such as "Word Fugitives" and "Primary Sources" as "cultural barometers".

In 2016, the periodical was named Magazine of the Year by the American Society of Magazine Editors (ASME). In 2022, its writers won Pulitzer Prizes for feature writing. in 2022, 2023, and 2024 The Atlantic won the ASME award for general excellence.

== Digital presence and other ventures ==
=== Web presence ===
==== Content ====
The Atlantic went online with AOL in 1993. They created an independent website The Atlantic Monthly on the Web in 1995, becoming "Atlantic Unbound" in 1997.

By 2011 The Atlantic's web properties included TheAtlanticWire.com, a news- and opinion-tracking site launched in 2009, and TheAtlanticCities.com, a stand-alone website started in 2011 that was devoted to global cities and trends.

In December 2011, a new Health Channel launched on TheAtlantic.com, incorporating coverage of food, as well as topics related to the mind, body, sex, family, and public health. Its launch was overseen by Nicholas Jackson, who had previously been overseeing the Life channel and initially joined the website to cover technology. TheAtlantic.com has also expanded to visual storytelling, with the addition of the "In Focus" photo blog, curated by Alan Taylor.

In 2015, TheAtlantic.com launched a dedicated Science section and in January 2016 it redesigned and expanded its politics section in conjunction with the 2016 U.S. presidential race.

==== Access ====
The Atlantic had a paywall, being only available to subscribers to the print edition, until January 2008, when they removed it, concomitant with a sponsorship from Goldman Sachs. According to a Mashable profile in December 2011, "traffic to the three web properties recently surpassed 11 million uniques per month, up a staggering 2500% since The Atlantic brought down its paywall in early 2008."

A new paywall was expected to start trials in January 2018, but the project was delayed until September 2019 while platform improvements and staff recruitment were completed. Unsubscribed readers access was restricted to five free articles per month.

The website is, as of 2025 a four tier freemium model. All paid subscribers have access to unlimited articles including the archives and narrated articles and various other features. The base paid model is "Digital" subscriber, the higher tier "Print & Digital" includes physical copies of the magazine, and the "Premium" subscription includes advertisement free access ($120 per year).

=== The Atlantic Wire ===
In 2009, the magazine launched The Atlantic Wire as a stand-alone news aggregator site. It was intended as a curated selection of news and opinions from online, print, radio, and television outlets. At its launch, it published op-eds from across the media spectrum and summarized significant positions in each debate. It later expanded to feature news and original reporting.

Regular features in the magazine included "What I Read", describing the media diets of people from entertainment, journalism, and politics; and "Trimming the Times", the feature editor's summary of the best content in The New York Times. The Atlantic Wire rebranded itself as The Wire in November 2013, and was folded back into The Atlantic the following year.

=== Atlantic Studios ===
In August 2011, it created its video channel. Initially created as an aggregator, The Atlantic's video component, Atlantic Studios, has since evolved in an in-house production studio that creates custom video series and original documentaries. In June 2020, The Atlantic released its first full-length documentary, White Noise, a film about three alt-right activists.

=== CityLab ===
In September 2011, The Atlantic launched CityLab, a separate website. Its co-founders included urban theorist and professor Richard Florida. The stand-alone site described itself as exploring and explaining "the most innovative ideas and pressing issues facing today's global cities and neighborhoods." In 2014, it was rebranded as CityLab.com, covering transportation, environment, equity, life, and design. Among its offerings are Navigator, "a guide to urban life"; and Solutions, which covers solutions to problems in a dozen topics.

In 2015, CityLab and Univision launched CityLab Latino, which features original journalism in Spanish as well as translated reporting from the English language edition of CityLab.com. The site has not been updated since 2018.

In early December 2019, Atlantic Media sold CityLab to Bloomberg Media, which promptly laid off half the staff. The site was relaunched on June 18, 2020, with few major changes other than new branding and linking the site with other Bloomberg verticals and its data terminal.

=== Aspen Ideas Festival ===
In 2005, The Atlantic and the Aspen Institute launched the Aspen Ideas Festival, a ten-day event in and around the city of Aspen, Colorado. The annual conference features 350 presenters, 200 sessions, and 3,000 attendees. The event has been called a "political who's who" as it often features policymakers, journalists, lobbyists, and think tank leaders.

== Critique and controversies ==
On January 14, 2013, The Atlantic's website published sponsored content promoting David Miscavige, the leader of the Church of Scientology. While the magazine had previously published advertising with the appearance of an article, this was widely criticized. The page comments were moderated by the marketing team, not by editorial staff, and comments critical of the church were removed. Later that day, The Atlantic removed the piece from its website and issued an apology.

In 2018 The Atlantic published a cover story by Jesse Singal titled "When Children Say They're Trans" which involved undisclosed consultation with 4thWaveNow, an anti-trans group. The article was criticized by transgender people, parents of trans children, journalists, and other researchers. The Atlantic went on to publish a series of critical responses.

In 2019, the magazine published an exposé on the allegations against movie director Bryan Singer that "sent Mr. Singer's career into a tailspin", according to New York Times reporter Ben Smith. It was originally contracted to Esquire magazine, but the writers moved it there due to what Smith described as Hearst Magazines's "timid" nature. Jeffrey Goldberg said "There's not a lot of nuance here, they spiked a story that should have been published in the public interest for reasons unknown."

In June 2020, The Atlantic faced legal action in Japan that claimed defamation and invasion of privacy in the article "When the Presses Stop" by Molly Ball, published in the January/February 2018 edition, which led to numerous removals, corrections and clarifications after a settlement was reached in January 2024. The lawsuit highlighted fact-checking and ethical concerns, bringing attention to the magazine's editorial practices.

On February 5, 2024, The Atlantic cut ties with contributor Yascha Mounk after he was accused of rape. He called the allegation "categorically untrue."

In 2025, national-security leaders in the Donald Trump administration accidentally included The Atlantic editor Jeffrey Goldberg in a group chat where they organized and strategized upcoming military strikes on the Houthis.

=== Ruth Shalit Barrett retraction and lawsuit ===
On November 1, 2020, The Atlantic retracted an article, "The Mad, Mad World of Niche Sports Among Ivy League–Obsessed Parents", after an inquiry by The Washington Post. An 800-word editor's note said, "We cannot attest to the trustworthiness and credibility of the author, and therefore we cannot attest to the veracity of the article." The note alleged that the article's author, freelancer Ruth Shalit Barrett, had left the staff of The New Republic in 1999 amid allegations of plagiarism.

On January 7, 2022, Barrett sued the magazine for defamation. The lawsuit claimed The Atlantic misrepresented Barrett's background and destroyed her journalistic career through what it publicly said about her. In legal filings, Barrett argued that The Atlantic's handling of allegations and errors in another article written by Molly Ball demonstrated inconsistency in the magazine's editorial standards and accountability measures. Barrett asserted that the factual inaccuracies and ethical violations in Ball's piece, as highlighted by a separate defamation lawsuit that resulted in a settlement and numerous retractions and corrections to Ball's story, were "transgressions far more numerous and incomparably worse" than any mistakes attributed to her own work.

In June 2025, after mediation, Barrett and The Atlantic reached a settlement and jointly moved to dismiss the case with prejudice. Court filings showed that on June 26 the magazine updated its online editor’s note to clarify that the pseudonymous source “Sloane” was anonymous, that Barrett says she elected to leave The New Republic, and that she did not ask the magazine to use a novel byline. The revision also changed a statement that she had encouraged “at least one source” to lie to “a source.” The following day, the parties filed their stipulation of dismissal in federal court. Although the settlement terms were not publicly disclosed in court, The New York Times reported that The Atlantic agreed to pay Barrett more than $1 million. TheWrap, citing the Times, also reported the payment. The story remains retracted and, according to an Atlantic spokesperson, the editor’s note will not be updated further.

=== Coverage of Israel and Palestine ===
In 2023, fact-checking website Misbar characterized The Atlantic's coverage of the November 2023 Gaza war ceasefire as aiming to depict Israel in a positive light, noting that it referred to the released Israeli hostages as hostages, while describing Palestinian prisoners held in custody by Israel as "Palestinians who... have been accused or convicted of serious crimes".

In 2024, The Nation discussed The Atlantic's coverage of pro-Palestinian student protests, saying that the magazine had repeatedly portrayed the protests as irrational, militant, and intimidating. In 2024, in a New York's Intelligencer article about Ta-Nehisi Coates' evolution as a writer since the appearance of Coates' Case for Reparations article in The Atlantic, Ryu Spaeth expressed an unfavorable opinion of The Atlantic's coverage of Israel and Palestine, claiming that "The hallmarks of The Atlantic’s coverage include variations of Israel's seemingly limitless 'right to defend itself'". The publications The New Arab, The New Republic and Al Jazeera Journalism Review criticized Graeme Wood's article "The UN's Gaza Statistics Make No Sense", particularly its statement that "it is possible to kill children legally" under the laws of war.

In his 2026 book How to Sell a Genocide, media analyst Adam H. Johnson said The Atlantic's Gaza war coverage was aimed at "immediately and urgently pushing the concept of a ceasefire outside the realm of Seriousness" and "downplaying the soaring death count and lending credibility to Gaza death count denialism, or what we call Liberal Pallywood-ism". He said that Atlantic editor-in-chief Jeffrey Goldberg, who is a former IDF prison guard, "shaped an opinion and reporting output that—with very rare exception—reinforced every premise of the genocide, especially in its early, critical weeks".

== List of editors ==
- James Russell Lowell, 1857–1861
- James T. Fields, 1861–1871
- William Dean Howells, 1871–1881
- Thomas Bailey Aldrich, 1881–1890
- Horace Scudder, 1890–1898
- Walter Hines Page, 1898–1899
- Bliss Perry, 1899–1909
- Ellery Sedgwick, 1909–1938
- Edward A. Weeks, 1938–1966
- Robert Manning, 1966–1980
- William Whitworth, 1980–1999
- Michael Kelly, 1999–2003
- Cullen Murphy, 2003–2006 (interim editor, never named editor-in-chief)
- James Bennet, 2006–2016
- Jeffrey Goldberg, 2016–present

== See also ==
- The New Yorker
