= NeXT Introduction =

The NeXT Introduction, sub-titled "the Introduction to the NeXT Generation of Computers for Education", was a lavish, invitation-only gala launch event for the NeXT Computer (also called the NeXT Computer System). It was described as a multimedia extravaganza. It was held at the Louise M. Davies Symphony Hall, San Francisco, California on Wednesday October 12, 1988. The event ran from 9:30am till 12 noon. Attendees were all given a unique launch event poster.

After Steve Jobs departed Apple three years prior to this event, he sank from sight only emerging once in 1986 to unveil the NeXT logo and once in early 1987 to announce that H. Ross Perot had invested $20 million in NeXT inc. Otherwise, Steve Jobs shunned public appearances at computer-industry events to avoid having to comment publicly about his new company's activities. But then he re-emerged with this launch in what was described as having "the subtlety of a Hollywood première" in what was his first major public appearance since leaving Apple. Jobs hired multimedia artist George Coates to stage the unveiling.

At the time, the event was considered the launch of not just a new computer, but also a new Steve Jobs. With Jobs himself telling his audience "It's great to be back."

More than 3000 invitations were sent out to educators, software developers & reporters for the launch event but not a single Apple employee was invited.

The company rented the Davies Symphony Hall, supposedly because of its good acoustics, to show off the DSPs that allowed the computer to play full stereo sound. The machine played a duet with one of the symphony's violinists.

Jobs opened the show with a purpose-built animation built by NeXT UI Architect Keith Ohlfs, demonstrating the history of computer interfaces and the multi-tasking capabilities of the NeXT computer.

The following day October 13 saw the follow-up event "The NeXT Day" where selected educators and software developers were invited (for $100 registration fee) to send up to four key individuals to attend the first public technical overview of the NeXT Computer which was held at the San Francisco Hilton. This event gave developers interested in developing NeXT software an insight into the software architecture, object-oriented programming and developing for the NeXT Computer. The luncheon speaker was Steve Jobs.

The program was designed for experienced developers and provided a technical overview of the NeXT software architecture and development environment.

This Launch event was replicated at other venues over the following days at other locations such as Boston's Symphony Hall and University of California, Riverside.

== Agenda ==
Each attendee received an agenda for the day:

Who	Developers interested in developing NeXT software
What	The NeXT Day
When	8AM to 6PM, October 13, 1988 (luncheon included)
Where	San Francisco Hilton (Mason & O'Farrell Streets)
Why	To provide a technical overview of the NeXT computer
How	Fill out and return the enclosed registration form

8:00	Continental Breakfast
9:00	Opening
	Product Overview
	Software Architecture
	Building User Interfaces
	NeXT Software Toolkit
12:00	Luncheon, speaker: Steven P. Jobs
1:30	NeXT Operating System
	Display PostScript
	Object-oriented Programming
	Developing for the NeXT Computer
	NeXT Developer Services
	Closing Remarks
5:00	Reception

== Launch poster ==
The launch poster was given to delegates of the launch event. It measured 37" by 17" and was printed on heavy poster paper. The poster's design consisted of a NeXT Computer, Screen, Keyboard, Mouse and Laser Printer. It also incorporated the NeXT logo designed by Paul Rand and the text "October 12, 1988 - Computing Advances To The NeXT Level".
