= Kōbun Chino Otogawa =

American Buddhist monk (1938–2002)

Kobun Otogawa
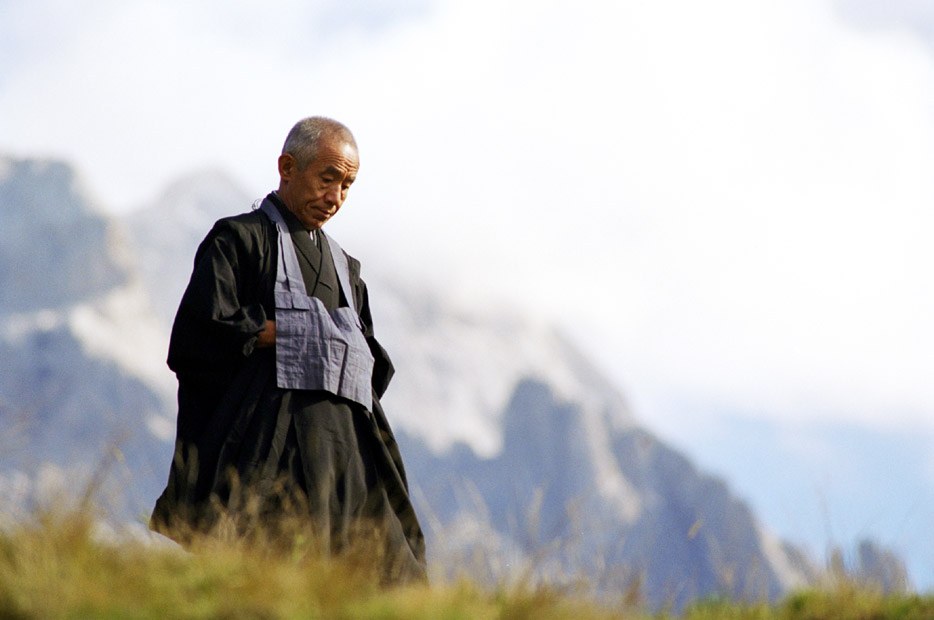
- Title: Zen priest

Personal life
- Born: February 1, 1938
- Died: July 26, 2002 (aged 64) Switzerland
- Cause of death: Drowning

Religious life
- Religion: Zen Buddhism
- School: Sōtō

Senior posting
- Based in: Haiku Zen Center

Kōbun Otogawa (乙川 弘文, Otogawa Kōbun) (February 1, 1938 – July 26, 2002) was an American Sōtō Zen priest.

== Biography ==
Otogawa, who preferred to be called by his first name, rather than by either of the Japanese Zen honorifics: sensei (teacher) or roshi (master), came to San Francisco, California, United States, from Japan in 1967 in response to an invitation from Shunryu Suzuki-roshi, serving as his assistant at Tassajara Zen Mountain Center until 1970.

Otogawa was the son of a Sōtō Zen priest and was ordained a priest himself at the age of 12. He did undergraduate studies at Komazawa University and received a master's degree in Mahayana Buddhism from Kyoto University. He then trained for three years at Eiheiji. Among his primary teachers was the unconventional Zen master Kodo Sawaki, known as the last of the unsui, or wandering monks, who had refused an invitation to be the head teacher at Eiheiji but instead chose to wander from place to place teaching, never staying in the same place for more than three days.

Originally there were plans for Otogawa to guide a satellite group of the San Francisco Zen Center located in Los Altos, California, but he was most needed at Tassajara Zen Mountain Center (where he stayed until 1970). He moved to Los Altos and began teaching there at the Haiku Zendo shortly after leaving Tassajara, in the late summer of 1970. After Suzuki's death in 1971, Otogawa became the official head of Haiku Zen Center (soon after incorporated under the name Bodhi) in Los Altos, remaining there as teacher until 1978. During this time, he also was integral to the formation of the Santa Cruz Zen Center. He went on to establish another center, Hokoji, in Arroyo Seco near Taos, New Mexico, taught regularly at Naropa University, and returned periodically to Bodhi to lead retreats.

In 1983 Kobun Chino Roshi and a group of students established Jikoji, a rustic mountain retreat center located in the Santa Cruz Mountains.

On March 18, 1991, Otogawa presided over the marriage of Steve Jobs and Laurene Powell.

He died in Switzerland on July 26, 2002 by drowning while trying to save his five-year-old daughter Maya who had fallen from a dock, who also drowned.

== Dharma heirs ==
Otogawa taught many students over the years in the United States and Europe. His dharma heirs include:

- Carolyn Atkinson (Santa Cruz, California)
- Angie Boissevain (San Jose, California)
- Ian Forsberg (Taos, New Mexico)
- Jean Leyshon (Taos, New Mexico)
- Tim McCarthy (Kent, Ohio)
- Martin Mosko (Boulder, Colorado)
- Michael Newhall (Los Gatos, California))
- Vanja Palmers (Lucerne, Switzerland)
- Bob Watkins (Taos, New Mexico)

== Teaching stories ==
Otogawa asked: "When all the teachers are gone, who will be your teacher?"

The student replied: "Everything!"

Kobun paused, then said: "No, you."

Ian Forsberg reports:

With Kobun, there was a very spacious and all-encompassing kind of feeling—you know, there wasn't any pretension there. He just allowed everything to happen. For instance, the first session I went to I just couldn't complete the whole thing physically. So I left, though someone called him to talk to me before I left and he said, "We'll be here, just come back anytime." I think it was that kind of openness that allowed many people to connect to Buddhist practice, some of whom went on to become longtime practitioners. He allowed everyone to just be who they are. He never rejected anyone or their circumstances—he was always accommodating. Everybody was sitting in different kinds of clothes, you know? Mostly a jeans and t-shirt type of thing.

During a shosan (a formal public question-and-answer session) Angie Boissevain came before Otogawa with a question that had been burning within her all morning. But after she made the customary three bows and knelt before him she found her mind utterly blank, the question gone. She sat before him in silence for a long time before finally saying: "Where have all the words gone?" "Back where they came from," replied Otogawa.

Shortly after September 11, 2001, Otogawa was the honored guest at the weekly meeting of the sangha which would become Everyday Dharma Zen Center. After meditation, Otogawa asked for questions. A visibly distraught young woman asked, "How can I deal with the enormous fear and anger that I feel about what happened?" Otogawa replied, "Do one kind thing for someone every day."

As a master of kyūdō (Japanese archery), Otogawa was asked to teach a course at the Esalen Institute in Big Sur, California. The target was set up on a grassy area on the edge of a cliff over the Pacific Ocean. Otogawa took his bow, notched the arrow, took careful aim, and shot. The arrow sailed high over the target, went past the railing, beyond the cliff, only to plunge into the ocean far below. Otogawa looked happily at the shocked students and shouted, "Bull's eye!!"

At a gathering of some of Otogawa's long-term students in Santa Cruz, California, shortly before Otogawa's death, a student asked, "Kobun, why do we sit?" He replied:

We sit to make life meaningful. The significance of our life is not experienced in striving to create some perfect thing. We must simply start with accepting ourselves. Sitting brings us back to actually who and where we are. This can be very painful. Self-acceptance is the hardest thing to do. If we can't accept ourselves, we are living in ignorance, this darkest night. We may still be awake, but we don't know where we are. We cannot see. The mind has no light. Practice is this candle in our very darkest room.

== Writings ==
- 2002. "Changing the World", "No Thought Required", "New Tricks?" (with Angie Boissevain), and "Form Is Emptiness" (with Angie Boissevain). In One Bird, One Stone: 108 American Zen Stories, edited by Sean Murphy, 101–106. New York: Renaissance Books ISBN 1-58063-221-1.

== See also ==
- Timeline of Zen Buddhism in the United States
