= Angie Boissevain =

American Buddhist priest

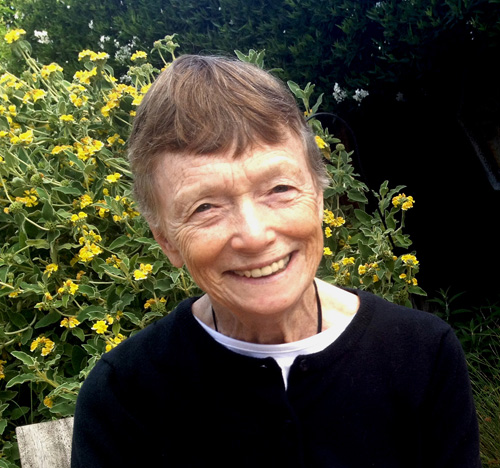
- Boissevain in 2015
- Title: Roshi

Personal life
- Born: Annabel Dawson; June 11, 1936 (age 90) St. Louis, Missouri, USA
- Children: 3 children
- Education: Antioch College in Yellow Springs Ohio

Religious life
- Religion: Buddhism
- School: Sōtō
- Lineage: Phoenix Cloud
- Dharma name: Zuiko Enji

Senior posting
- Teacher: Kobun Chino Otogawa
- Based in: Floating Zendo
- Predecessor: Vanja Palmers

Military service
- Website: https://www.floatingzendo.org/

Angie Boissevain is a Sōtō Zen priest leading the Floating Zendo in San Jose, California. A Dharma heir of Vanja Palmers, for many years she was director and then teacher of Jikoji in the Santa Cruz Mountains. As of 2012, she leads meditation retreats in California.

== Biography ==
Angie Boissevain was first introduced to meditation while in a Midwestern college when she attended a small Quaker meeting house on campus. She married while still in college, had her first child just after graduation, and moved with this family to San Francisco, California (Boissevain- Paula Jones). Soon afterwards, on a weekend excursion in the Santa Lucia Mountains in Big Sur, she and her husband stumbled upon Tassajara Zen Mountain Center. The couple arrived just after the center had completed its first winter sesshin and had opened to the public for the summer guest season in 1968. They stayed that weekend and heard a talk by Shunryu Suzuki and were introduced to the practice of zazen. They continued to return to Tassajara for weekends every year until one summer a student told her that the Zen Master, Kobun Chino Otogawa, was teaching within three miles of her home. After a few hesitant months, she found her way to Haiku Zendo in Los Altos where Kobun had replaced the ailing Suzuki Roshi as teacher. She became Kobun's student.

Her husband traveled frequently, so it took some effort to attend to both home (raising 3 sons) and practice. Because sesshins were held in a youth hostel close to her home, she could see the children to their school bus, slip off to sit sesshin, and pick them up when the bus returned in the afternoon. When she received the precepts in 1971, Kobun gave her the name Enji (Boissevain-Wendy Graham). In those early days Kobun encouraged his students to marry, have children, and to live “everyday” lives as secret Bodhisattvas. In his words: “If you think people at home are not practicing while you are at sesshin, you are making a mistake”.

In 1983 Kobun and his students formally established Jikoji, Compassion Light Temple in the Santa Cruz Mountains of California, (Boissevain-Jikoji founding) and Angie served as director there until 1993 (Boissevain-Wendy Graham). After Kobun moved to Taos, New Mexico to create Hokoji, Wisdom Light Temple, he returned to the Bay Area to teach only occasionally. Meanwhile, Angie filled in for sesshins as a shy substitute teacher at Jikoji. Kobun's way of encouraging her came in the form of small surprises. One day he asked Angie to assist him during a memorial service. Standing at the altar, Kobun picked up a nyo-i teaching stick, incensed it, and handed it to her before proceeding with the service at hand. This was one way he recognized her position and work there. Later he sent her to Green Gulch to sew a brown robe with Roshi Blanche Hartman. Three years later in 1991(Boissevain-Wendy Graham), during another memorial service, the robe appeared on the altar and was presented to Angie by Kobun and Blanche Roshi.

Angie was undergoing transmission with Kobun, but in 2002 he died in Switzerland while trying to save his drowning daughter. In 2004, Angie received Dharma transmission at Jikoji from Vanja Palmers, Kobun's Dharma heir.

After her years heading Jikoji, her children grown, Angie was able to travel to teach and also to study with Kobun in the US and Europe. Bay area students who practiced and studied with Angie adopted the name, Floating Zendo. Originally meeting in Los Gatos, the group eventually rented the San Jose Friends’ Meeting House, where practice takes place on Tuesday evenings and some Saturdays. An annual sesshin is held at Jikoji during the summer. She also gives bimonthly talks on Skype to her students at Floating Zendo San Diego and offers private interviews and small classes on Skype to students in the US and Europe (Boissevain - Paula Jones). Recently she participated as a training teacher in the SPOT priest training program at Empty Nest Temple (Shogakuzen flyer) Boissevain is a member of the American Zen Teachers Association. There are many recorded dharma talks by Angie on the Internet under sites managed by Insight Meditation Center, Jikoji and Floating Zendo.

== See also ==
- Buddhism in the United States
- Timeline of Zen Buddhism in the United States
