= Illmind production discography =

!llmind discography
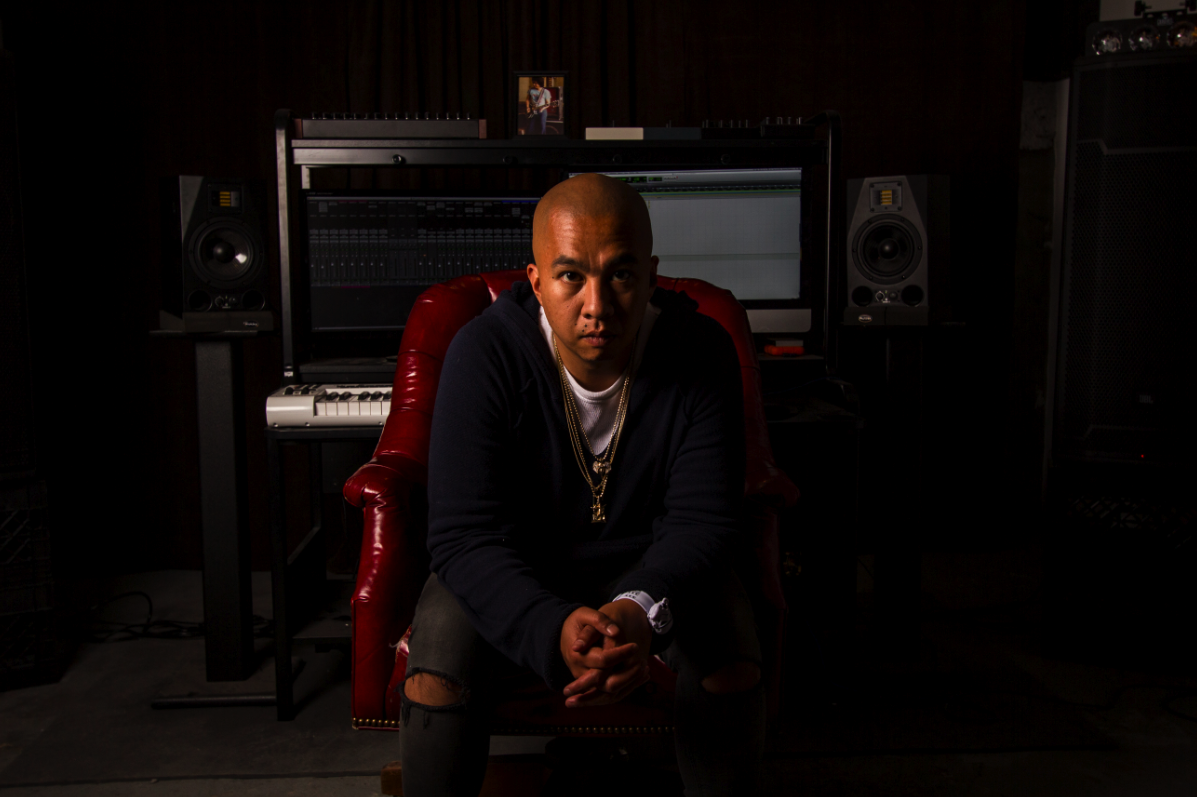
- Studio albums: 5
- Extended plays: 1+
- Live albums: 0
- Compilation albums: 3+
- Singles: 20+
- Music videos: 1+

The following is a list of productions by !llmind, an American hip hop producer. He has had a number of co-written and/or produced singles and studio albums reach the Billboard 200 charts since the mid-2000s, including his 2010 album Live from the Tape Deck. He has also worked with musicians such as Joell Ortiz, Symbolyc One, Skyzoo, and 50 Cent.

== Chart positions ==
The following is a list of studio albums by !llmind, with selected chart positions
Studio album	Album details	Peak chart positions			
Studio album	Album details	US	R&B	Rap	Ind
The Art of OneMind (with Symbolyc One)	Released: 2005; Label: Barely Breaking Even	—	—	—	—
The Official Illmind Remix Album	Released: 2009; Label: myx	—	—	—	—
Live from the Tape Deck (with Skyzoo)	Released: October 5, 2010; Label: Duck Down Records	3	33	16	30
Behind The Curtain	Released: April 19, 2011; Label: Nature Sounds Records	—	—	—	—
Human (with Joell Ortiz)	Released: July 17, 2015; Label: Roseville Music Group				

Singles produced by !llmind, with selected chart positions
Song title	Song details	Chart positions	
Song title	Song details	<100	R&B
"The Morning"	Album title: Cruel Summer; Released: September 14, 2012; Label: Def Jam, GOOD Music	19	49

Albums with tracks produced by !llmind, with selected album chart positions
Album title	Album/song details	Chart peaks			
Album title	Album/song details	US	R&B	Rap	Ind
The Last Stand (by Boot Camp Clik)	Tracks: "Let's Go"; Released: July 18, 2006; Label: Duck Down	—	48	—	20
Nu-Mixx Klazzics Vol. 2 (by 2Pac)	Tracks: "What'z Ya Phone # [Nu Mixx]"; Released: August 14, 2007; Label: Tha Row/Koch	45	8	—	2
Emeritus (by Scarface)	Tracks: "It's Not A Game," "Who Are They"; Released: December 2, 2008; Label: Rap-a-Lot	24	4	—	—
2014 Forest Hills Drive (by J. Cole)	Tracks: "Love Yourz"; Released: December 9, 2014; Label: Dreamville Records	1	1	1	—
If You're Reading This It's Too Late (by Drake)	Tracks: "You & the 6"; Released: February 13, 2015; Label: Cash Money	1	1	1	—
The Beast Is G-Unit (by G-Unit)	Tracks: Boy Boy; Released: March 3, 2015; Label: G-Unit Records	27	3	3	2
Ludaversal (by Ludacris)	Tracks: "Lyrical Healing," "Charge It to the Rap Game"; Released: March 31, 2015; Label: Def Jam	3	2	2	—

== Production credits ==
=== 2003–2005 ===
Fish Outta Water: The Remixes (Grand Agent)

- Released: 2003
- Label: Soulspazm
- Tracks: "Plans To Blow (Illmind Remix)" (Featuring Reef)

2003: Akrobatik - Balance (Coup D'État)

- Tracks: "Remind My Soul"

2004: The Last Poets, Dead Prez & Common - Panthers (Counterflow, Traffic)

- Tracks: "Panthers (Illmind Remix)"

2004: Braille - Shades Of Grey (Syntax)

- Tracks: "Nobody"

2004: Supastition - The Deadline (Soulspazm)

- Tracks: "Deadline (Intro)", "Boombox"

2004: Strange Fruit Project - Soul Travelin (Octave)

- Tracks: "Eternally Yours"

2004: Strange Fruit Project - From Divine (Special Edition) (Spilt Milk, Soul Kontrollaz Productions, Black Son)

- Tracks: "Back Drop" (Bonus Track)

2004: Organic Thoughts - The Purest Form (Blaze The World)

- Tracks: "World Renowned" (Featuring Large Professor), "Hypnotic Travellin", "No 1 Can Rise Above Me", "Higher Degree" (Featuring Illmind), "Get Fonkee" (Interlude), "Next Levelists", "Soul Movement", "Be Alright" (Featuring Prince Poetry and Uniq), "No Options" (Featuring Chan), "Get It Right" (Featuring Peril-L), "All Too Easy" (Featuring Uniq), "Tell Me Now" (Featuring Andrew Choi)

2005: Dave Ghetto - Love Life? (Counterflow)

- Tracks: "Day In And Day Out" (Scratches by DJ Kwestion), "The Game"

2005: Snacky Chan - The Killa Tape(Mixtape) (Dynasty Muzik)

- Tracks: "Lonely Road"

2005: The Pacifics & Illmind - The Case (All Natural)

- Tracks: "Matches", "Passport", "Maps Ronbe" (Featuring Ronde), "The Case", "Watch" (Featuring Russell Pride and Tanya Reed), "Black Book" (Featuring Russell Pride), "Antidote"/"The Case Part 2" (Scratches by Toadstyle)

2005: De Loach - The Life And Times Of Wally Deluxe (Black Son)

- Tracks: "Wha Cha Gon Do" (Featuring Kay), "Labor of Love" (Featuring Bavu Blakes and Poisoned FETUS), "Writer's Block"

2005: Saigon, Inspectah Deck & Bekay - The Raw (Coalmine)

- Tracks: "The Raw (Ill Side)"

2005: The Pacifics - Sunday's Chicken (All Natural)

- Tracks: "Magnificent", "Talk Is Cheap" (Featuring Rakaa Iriscience), "Prayers (God Talk)" (Featuring Denizen Kane) (Electric guitar by Pacoy Anag)

2005: Hezekiah - Hurry Up & Wait... (Soulspazm)

- Tracks: "Children Don't Play", "Before I Go"

2005: Fel Sweetenberg - Lost Dreams, Wasted Talent (Soulspazm)

- Tracks: "Lost Children (Illmind Remix)"

2005: Muneshine - Opportunity Knocks (Handcuts)

- Tracks: "Luke Warm" (Scratches by Muneshine), "Aight, Chill..." (Interlude), "Nine To Five", "Imagine That (Remix)" (Featuring Surreal) (Scratches by ReaLsoN)

2005: Little Brother - The Chittlin Circuit 1.5 (Fastlife)

- Tracks: "Nobody Like Me" (Featuring O-Dash and Darien Brockington), "The Beginning" (Featuring YahZarah)

2005: Raks One - Raks (Verses) The Industry (Wax Reform)

- Tracks: "Stand Down", "Over You", "This Is It" (Featuring Hassaan, Kenn Starr and Supastition)

2005:Edgar Allen Floe - True Links (MCEO)

- Tracks: "I For An I"

2005: Intense - The Bohemian Pimp Project (Defend Music)

- Tracks: "Bohemian Renaissance", "That's Life" (Featuring Lady Alma and Mushmouf) (Scratches by DJ Statik), "Need", "The Truth About Me", "A Healthy Obsession", "A New Beginning" (Scratches by DJ Statik)

2005: Supastition - Chain Letters (Soulspazm)

- Tracks: "Chain Letters (Intro)", "Soul Control" (Featuring Little Brother), "That Ain't Me", "Special Treatment", "Ain't Goin' Out", "100%", "Blood Brothers" (Featuring Seven), "Soul Control (Solo Version)"

2005: Supastition - Unreleased Remixes Vol. 1 (Reform School Music)

- Tracks: "Adrenile (Illmind Remix)"

2005: Chris Cureton - The Christening (Amped)

- Tracks: "Who I Am", "The Getdown" (Featuring Dan Johns, Mastamilli and Supastition), "Self Control", "All I Want", "My Philosophy", "Our Love", "Diamond In The Rough", "Step One"

=== 2006–2010 ===
2006: Various Artists - Heavy Rotation (Hiphop Is Music)

- Tracks: The Procussions & Strange Fruit Project - "Changes"

2006: Reef The Lost Cauze - Long Live The Cauze (F.U. Pay Me)

- Tracks: "Get Lost"

2006: Young Hannibal - Check My Resume (Amped)

- Tracks: "I'm That", "Rewind"

2006: Infinito 2017 - The Soul Of Benjamin Banneker In The Age Of The Aquarius (Nephew Of Frank)

- Tracks: "A Free Man's Soul"

2006: Kenn Starr - The Starr Report (Halftooth)

- Tracks: Supastition - "Ain't Goin' Out (Remix)" (Featuring Kenn Starr)

2006: Kaze - Word On The Street (Mixtape) (Vintage Music Group, Soul Dojo)

- Tracks: "Shut Up" (Featuring Amen, Erv Ford, Raks One and Silent Knight)

2006: El Da Sensei - The Unusual (Fat Beats)

- Tracks: "Crowd Pleasa", "Hold On"

2006: Kenn Starr - Starr Status (Halftooth)

- Tracks: "Against The Grain", "Inside" (Featuring Wayna)

2006: Boot Camp Clik - The Last Stand (Duck Down)

- Tracks: "Let's Go"

2006: Strange Fruit Project - The Healing (OM Hip Hop)

- Tracks: "You", "Get Live" (Featuring Erykah Badu), "Rise" (Featuring Little Brother)

2006: Othello - Alive At The Assembly Line (Miclife)

- Tracks: "Silhouette" (Featuring Dminor)

2006: Little Brother & DJ Drama - Separate But Equal (Heat)

- Tracks: "Can't Let Her"

2007: Silent Knight - Hunger Strike (Elementality Productions)

- Tracks: "Everybody Needs"

2007: Sean Price - Jesus Price Supastar (Duck Down)

- Tracks: "Cardiac" (Featuring Buckshot, Ruste Juxx and Flood)

2007: Mr. J. Medeiros - Of Gods And Girls (Miclife, HNGR Music)

- Tracks: "Change" (Featuring Rez and Strange Fruit Project)

2007: Skyzoo - Corner Store Classic (Mixtape)

- Tracks: "The Paper", "Never Sleep"

2007: Pumpkinhead - Border Blockerz Pt. 1 (Mixtape) (Red Army)

- Tracks: "Best Rappers Out" (Featuring Sean Price)

2007: 2Pac - Nu Mixx Klazzics Vol. 2: Evolution: Duets & Remixes (Amaru, Death Row, Koch)

- Tracks: "What'z Ya Phone # (Nu Mixx)" (Featuring Candy Hill)

2007: Supastition - Guest Of Honor (Reform School Music)

- Tracks: Kenn Starr - "This Is It" (Featuring Emilio Rojas, Hassann and Supastition)

2007: Strange Fruit Project - The Lost Documents Volume 1 (OM)

- Tracks: "Take It Slow" (Featuring Bavu), "The Grind", "The Definition" (Featuring Chip Fu and Knes)

2007: Little Brother - Getback (ABB)

- Tracks: "Sirens", "Can't Win For Losing", "Good Clothes", "That Ain't Love" (Featuring Jozeemo and Darien Brockington)

2007: Jozeemo - Cry Now L.A.F. Later (Defend Music)

- Tracks: "We Don't Wait" (feat. L.O.C.)

2007: Don Cerino - Nothing In Life Is Free (Mixtape)

- Tracks: "My Life"

2007: Raks One - For Good (Wax Reform)

- Tracks: "This Is It" (Featuring Hassaan Mackey, Kenn Starr and Supastition), "Over You"

2008: Chaundon - Carnage (Hall Of Justus, Defend Music)

- Tracks: "Selfish" (Featuring Joe Scudda and Jozeemo)

2008: Akrobatik - Absolute Value (Fat Beats)

- Tracks: "A To The K" (Featuring B-Real), "Rain", "Kindred" (Featuring Brenna Gethers and Chuck D), "If We Can't Build" (Featuring Bumpy Knuckles)

2008: Starrs & Murph - Boxes For Sale (Loose Change Muzik)

- Tracks: "Damn"

2008: Skyzoo - Corner Store Classic (The Remixes) (Audioworx)

- Tracks: "Never Sleep", "The Paper"

2008: Brooklyn Academy - Bored Of Education (Gold Dust Media)

- Tracks: "Raise Ya Hands" (Featuring Jean Grae), "Hide" (Featuring Fresh Jones and Keith Murray)

2008: The Wrist - Recycling Sucks (Otha Ish)

- Tracks: "Exit 9"

2008: El Da Sensei - Unheard Of (Next Mill)

- Tracks: "Thank You"

2008: Supastition - Leave Of Absence EP (Reform School Music)

- Tracks: "Thankful" (Featuring Kil Ripkin)

2008: Big Pooh - Rapper's Delight (Mixtape)

- Tracks: "Geez Like Deez" (Featuring Quan)

2008: Muneshine - Status Symbol (Australian Release) (Grindin)

- Tracks: "Mark My Word"

2008: Various Artists - DJ K.O. Presents "Picture This..." (Shaman Work Recordings)

- Tracks: "Get 'Em" (Featuring Silent Knight, Skyzoo, Emilio Rojas)

2008: Heltah Skeltah - D.I.R.T. (Da Incredible Rap Team) (Duck Down)

- Tracks: "Everything Is Heltah Skeltah", "So Damn Tuff" (Featuring Buckshot and Ruste Juxx)

2008: Diamond D - The Huge Hefner Chronicles (Babygrande)

- Tracks: "Don't Beg"

2008: Above Ave. - Mission

- Tracks: "Like We Do", "Drop The Rhymes" (Featuring J Wess), "Blast Off!!!", "Roof Of All Evil (Wake Up)"

2008: Bambu - Exact Change (Community Kitchen)

- Tracks: "Quit"

2008: Fresh Daily - Dub MD & Fresh Daily Presents...Winter Fresh (Mixtape)

- Tracks: "Get Over", "New Blood V2 (Featuring Emilio Rojas, Skyzoo and Torae)

2008: Scarface - Emeritus (Rap-A-Lot 4 Life, J. Prince)

- Tracks: "It's Not A Game", "Who Are They" (Featuring K-Rino and Slim Thug)

2008: Silent Knight - Holla Burton (The UnMixed Cassette) (Elementality Productions)

- Tracks: "Regular Guy", "The Wager" (Featuring 8th W1 and Fresh Daily), "Get 'Em" (Featuring East, Emilio Rojas and Skyzoo)

2009: Emilio Rojas - Recession Proof (Mixtape)

- Tracks: "Young, Fresh & Fly", "Murder" (Featuring Donny Goines and Mela Machinko)

2009: Fresh Daily - The Gorgeous Killer: In Crimes Of Passion (High Water Music)

- Tracks: "Wildlife", "Crimes Of Passion"

2009: Rapper Big Pooh - The Delightful Bars (The North American Pie Version) (Hall Of Justus)

- Tracks: "Problems" (Featuring Jozeemo)

2009: Various Artists - Rik Cordero presents "Inside A Change" (Soundtrack)

- Tracks: A.P. – "All I Seen" (Featuring Illmind)

2009: Skyzoo - The Power Of Words: The Mixtape (Mixtape) (Showoff Records, Jamla)

- Tracks: "Freshfest" (Featuring Wale), "Say What You Say" (Featuring Rapper Big Pooh and Naledge)

2009: Grynch – The Chemistry EP

- Tracks: "A Dream Undeferred"

2009: Monsters Ink – Ink Made Me a Monster (Mixtape)

- Tracks: Dynas - "Get Ya Mind Right"

2009: Rapper Big Pooh - The Delightful Bars (Candy Apple Version) (Hall Of Justus)

- Tracks: "The Release"

2009: The Residents - Open House (Domination Recordings)

- Tracks: "Something Like" (Featuring Rob Swift)

2009: Che Grand - Everything's Good Ugly (ZFTP, Believe Digital)

- Tracks: "Walking Under Ladders" (Featuring Elucid and Spec Boogie)

2009: Muneshine - Status Symbol (Domination Recordings)

- Tracks: "Mark My Words", "It's Mine" (Little Vic, Emilio Rojas, Skyzoo, Kenn Starr & D-Sisive)

2009: KRS-One & Buckshot - Survival Skills (Duck Down)

- Tracks: "Survival Skills" (Scratches by DJ Revolution), "Clean Up Crew" (Featuring Rock of Heltah Skeltah), "We Made It" (Featuring Slug of Atmosphere)

2009: Triple Play - The Second Inning EP (Hall Of Justus Records)

- Tracks: Chaundon - "Wake Up", Chaundon - "Back Up"

2009: Skyzoo - The Salvation (Duck Down)

- Tracks: "Dear Whoever"

2009: Jared Evan - Radio In My Head (Mixtape)

- Tracks: "Radio In My Head" (Produced with Illfactor), "They Don't Know", "Feeling Like A Song"

2009: Kida - Who Is Kida? Freestyle Series

- Tracks: MOVE! (feat. Al Gator & Rapper Big Pooh)

2009: Bekay - Hunger Pains (Coalmine Records)

- Tracks: "Crazy" (Featuring Heltah Skeltah)

2010: Various Artists - HiPNOTT Records 2010 Takeover Vol. 1 (mixtape)

- Tracks: Truck North – "Hot Outside"

2010: Kida - The Endemic

- Tracks: "The Wrong Rapper"

2010: NapsNdreds - Blackboard Jungle (Innercity Legends)

- Tracks: "Real Geez", "Call It Quits" (Featuring, Thirstin Howl Da 3rd), "Mic Stand", "Do What I Should" (Featuring Copywrite), "Get Ya Minds Right! (Featuring Emilio Rojas), "This Is Ours (Featuring Kool G Rap)

2010: Rakaa Iriscience - Crown of Thorns (Decon Records)

- Tracks: "Mezcal"

2010: Non-album track "Buck Buck" by Redman

2010: Tek - 24Kt Smoke (Duck Down Records)

- Tracks: "Pushin' Game"

2010: Laws - 5:01 Overtime (Non-DJ mixtape)

- Tracks: "Audio Savior"

2010: Various Artists - A (2)Dope Mixtape: Empire State Edition (mixtape)

- Tracks: Skyzoo, Torae & CurT@!n$ – "The Incredible"

2010: Spon - Spon 2: Beatfanatic Classics (Domination Recordings)

- Tracks: "Aim For the Sky" (Featuring PK)

2010: MindsOne - Self Reliance (Soulspazm Records)

- Tracks: "Keep Building"

2010: Jern Eye - Vision (RBC Records)

- Tracks: "Beautiful", "Something Wrong", "Change" (Featuring Lunar Heights), "The Difference" (Featuring Nightclubber Lang)

2010: Chaundon - No Excuses (Hall of Justus Records)

- Tracks: "Watch Out", "Wake Up"

2010: cap D - PolyMath (All Natural Inc.)

- Tracks: "King of the Mountain" (Featuring Brother Ali)

2010: Emilio Rojas - Life Without Shame (Mixtape)

- Tracks: "Champion" (Featuring Laura Reed & Voodoo)

2010: Y.E.S. - ¥€$ v.1

- Tracks: "Job Well Done"

2010: Copywrite - The Life and Times of Peter Nelson

- Tracks: "Trooper" (Featuring Sean Price), "Mother May I"

2010: D-Black - Long Story Short... EP

- Tracks: "House Of Mirrors" (Featuring Lady Lyric), "Busy Makin Money", "Ordinary Love", "Role Model"

2010: Redman - Pancake & Syrup (Mixtape)

- Tracks: "Fly"

2010: Tassho Pearce – #AlohaFriday

- Tracks: "Shaka Back" (Featuring Fortilive & Wun)

=== 2011–2014 ===
2011: Fortilive - I vs. I

- Tracks: "Ain't No Place", "Gimme!", "Mic & Me", "Fist Fights", "Jim Kelly" (Featuring Skyzoo), "Really Goes Down", "Come Get Me" (Featuring Dr. Know Jr.), "Wannabees", "The Come Up", "Goin' Thru It", "Pay Day" (Featuring Kam Moye), "Won't Tell" (Featuring Jik) (co-producer), "There They Go" (Featuring Uptown Swuite) (co-producer)

2011: Sonny Jim - The Purple Patch EP

- Tracks: "The Purple Patch (Part 3)"

2011: Jared Evan - Back and Fourth

- Tracks: "Falling Down"

2011: !llmind - Beh!nd The Curta!n

2011: Moke & Tone - Shot Heard Round the World

- Tracks: "Respect" (Featuring 1ne Man Sound, Black Buddha, Crooked I, Mr Metaphor & DJ Theory)

2011: Skyzoo - The Great Debater (Mixtape)

- Tracks: "Atypical", "Test Drive"

2011: Skyzoo - The Great Debater Revisited (Mixtape)

- Tracks: "Atypical", "Test Drive", "Rocket Science", "Floor Somethin'" (co-producer), "More" (Featuring Smokey Robotic)

2011: 50 Cent - The Big 10 (Mixtape)

- Tracks:
  No.	Title	Producer(s)	Length
  11.	"Stop Cryin'" (bonus track)	!llmind	2:54

2011: Torae - For the Record

- Tracks: "What It Sound Like" (Featuring Pav Bundy)

2011: Naturel - n/a

- Tracks: "Say", "More Bullets", "Burgundy & Gold"

2012: The Lost Tape (Mixtape) by 50 Cent

- Tracks:
  No.	Title	Producer(s)	Length
  11.	"When I Pop The Trunk" (featuring Kidd Kidd)	Illmind	2:25
  15.	"All His Love"	Illmind	3:16

2012: Cruel Summer by G.O.O.D. Music

- Tracks:
  No.	Title	Writer(s)	Producer(s)	Length
  5.	"The Morning" (featuring Raekwon, Pusha T, Common, 2 Chainz, Cyhi the Prynce, Kid Cudi, D'banj and Kanye West)	Ramon Ibanga, Jeff Bhasker, others	West, Illmind, Bhasker^{[a]}, Travis Scott^{[a]}	4:35

2012: A Dream Deferred by Skyzoo

- Tracks:
  No.	Title	Producer(s)	Length
  1.	"Dreams In a Basement" (featuring Jill Scott)	!llmind	5:59
  3.	"Pockets Full" (featuring Freeway)	!llmind	4:11
  4.	"Give It Up" (featuring DJ Prince)	!llmind	3:40
  5.	"Glass Ceilings"	!llmind	3:48

2013: Black Mozart by Ryan Leslie

- Tracks:
  No.	Title	Writer(s)	Producer(s)	Length
  1.	"Carnival of Venice"	Anthony Leslie, Ramon Ibanga, Jr.	Illmind	3:27
  5.	"Lay Down"	Leslie, Ibanga	Illmind	8:01
  7.	"Only the Lonely" (featuring Courtney Bennett)	Leslie, Ibanga	Illmind	6:08
  10.	"Bad Chicks"	Leslie, Ibanga	Illmind	5:54

2014: #BoomTrap EP by Illmind

- Tracks: Po Po Comin, Snake Charmer, Mugshot, Sinner, March (produced by !llmind), Far East Pt. II, Double Cross Me, Whistle

2014: 2014 Forest Hills Drive by J. Cole

- Tracks:
  No.	Title	Writer(s)	Producer(s)	Length
  12.	"Love Yourz"	J. Cole, Ramon Ibanga, Jr., Carl McCormick, Calvin Price	!llmind, Cardiak, CritaCal	3:31

=== 2015–2019 ===
2015: Music For My Friends by Skyzoo

- Tracks:
  No.	Title	Producer(s)	Length
  4.	"Luxury" (Westside Gunn)	!llmind	3:42
  5.	"Everything's For Sale"	!llmind	4:31
  8.	"Playing Favorites" (Christon Gray)	!llmind	4:11
  11.	"Civilized Leisure" (MoZaic)	!llmind	3:56
  13.	"Asking Bodie For A Package" (Skarr Akbar)	!llmind	5:18

2015: Ludaversal by Ludacris

- Tracks:
  No.	Title	Writer(s)	Producer(s)	Length
  4.	"Lyrical Healing"	Bridges, Adam Feeney, Maneesh Bidaye, Ramon Ibanga, Jr.	Illmind, Frank Dukes	1:16
  13.	"Charge It to the Rap Game"	Bridges, Feeny, Bidaye, Ibanga, Jr.	Illmind	3:50

2015: If You're Reading This It's Too Late by Drake

- Tracks:
  No.	Title	Writer(s)	Producer(s)	Length
  15.	"You & the 6"	Aubrey Graham, Samuels, Ramon Ibanga, Jr., Shebib, Allen Ritter	Boi-1da, Illmind^{[a]}, Noah "40" Shebib^{[a]}	4:24

2015: The Beast Is G-Unit by G-Unit

- Tracks:
  No.	Title	Producer(s)	Length
  5.	"Boy Boy"	Illmind, Jake One, G. Koop	4:09

2015: The Kanan Tape by 50 Cent

- Tracks:
  No.	Title	Producer(s)	Length
  7.	"On Everything"	Illmind	2:52

Redman - Mudface

- Undeniable

2016: Entitled by Torae

- Tracks:
  No.	Title	Producer(s)	Length
  7.	"Troubled Times" (featuring Mack Wilds)	Illmind	3:52

Lin-Manuel Miranda, Various artists - The Hamilton Mixtape

- Wrote My Way Out (Nas, Aloe Blacc and Dave East
- Who Tells Your Story (The Roots, Ingrid Michaelson and Common)

2016: Entitled by Torae

- Tracks:
  No.	Title	Producer(s)	Length
  7.	"Troubled Times" (featuring Mack Wilds)	Illmind	3:52

Fabolous - Summertime Shootouts 3

- Ah Man. {produced with Aarabmuzik}

2017: FUTURE by Future

- Tracks:
  No.	Title	Producer(s)	Length
  3.	"Zoom"	Fuse; Illmind

2017: American Teen by Khalid

- Tracks:
  No.	Title	Writer(s)	Producer(s)	Length
  14.	"Shot Down"	Khalid Robinson; Joshua Scruggs; Illmind	Syk Sense; Illmind	3:27

==== 2017 ====
Masta Killa - Loyalty Is Royalty

- Noodles Pt. 1

Lil Uzi Vert - Luv Is Rage 2

- "Pretty Mami" {produced with Don Cannon}

A Boogie wit da Hoodie - The Bigger Artist

- Undefeated (feat. 21 Savage) {produced with Murda Beatz}

Meek Mill - Wins & Losses

- Never Lose {produced with Infamous Rell}

Bryson Tiller - True to Self

- "Money Problemz/Benz Truck. {Mahxie, WondaGurl, FrancisGotHeat, Pro Logic, Rob Holladay, Boi-1da}

Quavo & Travis Scoot - HUNCHO JACK

- Huncho Jack {produced with Murda Beatz, MIke Dean}

==== 2018 ====
Various Artists - Black Panther (soundtrack)

- X - ScHoolboy Q, Kendrick Lamar, 2 Chainz & Saudi {produced with Sounwave}

Royce da 5'9" - Book of Ryan

- Stay Woke (feat. Ashley Sorrell) {produced with Ging}

Denzel Curry - Ta13oo

- SWITCH IT UP | ZWITCH 1T UP

Dave East - P2

- Thank You

Nicki Minaj - Queen

- Hard White {produced with Boi-1nda}

The Carters - Everything Is Love

- Heard About Us {produced with The Carters, Boi-1nda, Vinylz}

==== 2019 ====
Logic - Confessions of a Dangerous Mind

- Clickbait {produced with 6ix}

=== 2020–2025 ===
==== 2020 ====
KXNG Crooked and Joell Ortiz - H.A.R.D.

- Lovely

Reason - New Beginnings

- Sho Stoppa

== Collaboration albums ==
=== The Art of OneMind ===
2005: The Art of OneMind by !llmind and Symbolyc One (BBE)

- Tracks: "Art Of OneMind (Intro)", "Been Gone" feat. Strange Fruit Project, Proh Mic and S'ence, "Neva Gone Change" feat. Supastition, "Club Aquarius" feat. Tree and Dow Jones, "Hush" feat. Deloach, Myone and Kay, "Right Here" feat. Little Brother and Median, "Blue Notes" feat. Free Agents, Oneself and Myone, "Hands Off" feat. K-Otix and Deloach, "Night Like This" feat. Darien Brockington and Big Pooh, "The Broke Song" feat. Strange Fruit Project, "The Groove" feat. Organic Thoughts, "Milk 'em" feat. Ghostface, Trife and Myone, "Day After Day" feat. Moon Cricket and Verbal Seed, "Onemind" feat. El Da Sensei and Chip Fu, "We Three Kings" feat. Myth, Bavu and Chucky Sly, "Guilty Pleasures" feat. Kenn Starr and Thesis, "High Powered" feat. The Procussions

=== Live from the Tape Deck ===
2010: Live from the Tape Deck by Skyzoo & Illmind (Duck Down Records)

- Tracks:
  No.	Title	Writer(s)	Length
  1.	"Digital Analog"	Gregory Taylor, Ramon Ibanga Jr.	3:30
  2.	"Frisbees"	Taylor, Ibanga	3:41
  3.	"The Burn Notice" (featuring Heltah Skeltah)	Taylor, Ibanga, Jahmal Bush, Sean Price	3:51
  4.	"Speakers on Blast"	Taylor, Ibanga	3:29
  5.	"#Allabouthat"	Taylor, Ibanga	3:01
  6.	"Barrel Brothers" (featuring Torae)	Taylor, Ibanga, Torae Carr	3:12
  7.	"The Winner's Circle"	Taylor, Ibanga	3:52
  8.	"Krylon"	Taylor, Ibanga	3:25
  9.	"Kitchen Table"	Taylor, Ibanga	4:56
  10.	"The Now or Never" (featuring Styles P & Buckshot)	Taylor, Ibanga, David Styles, Kenyatta Blake	3:21
  11.	"Understanding Riley" (featuring Rhymefest)	Taylor, Ibanga, Che Smith	3:10
  12.	"Langston's Pen"	Taylor, Ibanga	3:04

=== Human ===
2015: Human by Illmind and Joell Ortiz (Roseville Music Group)

- Tracks: Human (Intro), New Era, I Just Might, My N*ggas, Six Fo', Light A L, Lil' Piggies, Latino Pt. 2, Who Woulda Knew, Bad Santa, Human (Outro)

== Mixtapes ==
=== 2008: Blaps, Rhymes & Life ===
2008: Blaps, Rhymes & Life

- Tracks: Get Ya Ass Up! (Intro), Heltah Skeltah - "Everything Is Heltah Skeltah", Brooklyn Academy - "Raise Ya Hands" (feat. Jean Grae), Fresh Daily - "Get Over", D-Black - "The Come Up" (feat. Skyzoo), 50 Cent - "Make A Movie", Supastition - "Thankful" (feat. Kil Ripkin), Naturel - "The Bullets", K.O. (K-Otix) - "48 Seasons", Torae - "New Blood" (feat. Skyzoo, Emilio Rojas & Fresh Daily), Fortilive - "The Come Up", Broken English - "Different World", Skyzoo - "Lyrically Inclined" (feat. Wale), Naps N Dreds - "Do What I Should" (feat. Copywrite), Quan - "Geez Like Deez" (feat. Rapper Big Pooh), Naturel - "Resurrect", 8th W1 - "A Fool’s Lullaby", Faro-Z - "Clap Ya Hands", A.P.E.X. - "One More Time", LL Cool J - "Queens" (feat. Prodigy, 50 Cent, Kool G Rap, & Tony Yayo), Wannabe? (Outro)

=== 2009: Blaps, Rhymes & Life, Vol II ===
2009: Blaps, Rhymes & Life, Vol II

- Tracks: Mic Legacy - "Larry Davis", D-Black - "Hold Up", 50 Cent f/ Eminem, Cashis, Lloyd Banks - "Who Run It", Heltah Skeltah f/ Buckshot, Ruste Juxx - "So Damn Tuff", Scarface - "It's Not A Game", Thoth f/ Oh No - "MA To The West", Naps N Dreds f/ Kool G Rap - "Bully!", Diamond D - "Don't Beg", Pumpkinhead f/ Talib Kweli - "Of The Same Air", Fortilive - "Trunk Pop Music", Project Heights f/ Rakaa Iriscience, Noelle Scaggs - "Champion", Sleek - "Hi New Orleans", Che Grand - "Streets", Starrs & Murph - "Damn", Bambu - "Quit", Above Ave - "Roof Of All Evil", Grynch - "A Dream Undeferred", KINGDOM (The Movement) - "Heartache", Naturel - "Love To The World", Blitzkrieg - "Ruling Elite", Megaciph - "War", Mister RP - "Diamonds Aren't Good Enough"

=== 2009: Blaps, Rhymes & Life, Vol III ===
2009: Blaps, Rhymes & Life, Vol III

- Tracks: Intro f/ The Real "Master Shake" (Aqua Teen Hunger Force), D-Black - "Superbad", Young Buck f/ 50 Cent - "Hold On", Skyzoo & Wale - "Freshfest", Rapper Big Pooh f/ Jozeemo - "Problems", Cres f/ Termanology - "Restless", Kaze - "Dusk Til' Dawn", Scarface f/ K-Rino & Slim Thug - "Who Are They", Kida f/ Marsha Ambrosius - "We Made It", Dominique Larue f/ Kim Joyce - "Okay", Kids Incorporated (88-Keys, Evidence & The Alchemist) - "Stay Up! (Viagra)", Common - "I Want U (Shmoove Mix)", MindsOne - "Instinct", Thoth f/ Termanology - "On My Terminator Shit", Edo. G f/ Masta Ace - "Wishin'", Fortilive (Illmind, Mushmouf & Slo-Mo) f/ 84 - "Cowboys", C.B. News f/ Torae - "Bumrush The Show", Deep Foundation - "Girls", AP - "All I’ve Seen", Vox Merger f/ Far East Movement - "Do Or Die"

=== 2009: The Official Illmind Remix Album ===
2009: The Official Illmind Remix Album (MYX)

- Tracks: Intro, Jay-Z - "Change Clothes", Common - I Want You, John Legend - Ordinary People, Slum Village - Look of Love, Bahamadia - Queen Talk, Brandy & Kanye West - Talk About Our Love, Masta Ace f/ Guru - Conflict, Strange Fruit Project - Waitin', Jay-Z - "99 Problems", Muneshine f/ Surreal - Imagine That", The Roots - "What You Want", Saigon, Inspectah Deck & Bekay - The Raw, Edo. G f/ Masta Ace - Wishin', Alicia Keys - "You Don't Know My Name", O.C. - Story to Tell", O.C. - "Childhood", En Vogue - "Untitled", Fortilive - "The Come Up" (Bonus Track), Fortilive - "Trunk Pop Music" (Bonus Track), Fortilive - "Goin' Thru It" (Bonus Track), Fortilive f/ 84 - "Cowboys" (Bonus Track)

=== 2009: Blaps, Rhymes & Life, Vol IV ===
2009: Disc 1: Blaps, Rhymes & Life

- Tracks: Thoth – "Get Your Game Right!, Clap Cognac – "I’m Gonna Do It", Fortilive (Illmind, Mushmouf & Slo-Mo) – "Gimme", Mistah F.A.B. – "Follow Me", Brooklyn Academy – "Hide" (feat. Fresh Jones & Keith Murray), Seer – "Ill Mind", KNGDM – "Gazillion", KRS-One & Buckshot – "Survival Skills" (feat. DJ Revolution), Contra – "Fall Back", Skyzoo – "Say What You Say" (feat. Rapper Big Pooh & Naledge), Verbal Kent – "Examples" (feat. Lance Ambu), Truck North – "Hot!", BURNTmd – "Let's Get ILL" (feat. Reef The Lost Cauze, Copywrite, Phil Da Agony & Reks), Naps N Dreds – "Call It Quits" (feat. Thirstin Howl III), Roscoe Umali – "Blow Your Mind"

Disc 2: Blaps, Soul & Life

- Tracks: D-Black – "No Ordinary Love", Gliffics – "Call Me Crazy" (feat. Lenny Harold) (Additional guitars by Maki), Strange Fruit Project – "Get Live" (feat. Erykah Badu), Jared Evan – "They Don't Know", Eric Roberson – "Remember When (Remix)", Daria Jones – "Stay", Rae – "So Sexy", Grynch – "The Right Way", 3D – "If I Want To", Naeem Oba – "Julia" (feat. BrikAbrak), Hydroponikz – "The Blues" (feat. Jay Legaspi), Sleek – "We Rock The Mic", Last Days Fam – "What You Doin It For", Naturel – "We Don't Play", Black Irish – "Kick Rocks"

=== 2011: Blaps, Rhymes & Life, Vol V ===
Disc 1

- Tracks: Laws – "Audio Savior", Smokey Robotic – "Voices In My Mind", Emilio Rojas – "Champion" f. Voodoo & Laura Reed, Jared Evan – "Falls Down Again", The Problemaddicts – "Dedication" f. Masta Ace & Ed O.G., Copywrite – "Trooper" f. Sean Price, Skyzoo, Torae & Curta!n$ – "The Incredible", Redman – "Fly", Naturel – "Burgundy & Gold", Fortilive – "Shaka Back" f. Tassho Pearce & Wun, Ican & Ab-Liva – "Job Well Done", Gliffics – "Your Favorite Pharaoh" f. Lenny Harold, Siege – "Keep It Real", Illest Rhyme Droppaz – "True Colors" f. Skyzoo, Cap D – "King Of The Mountain" f. Brother Ali, Big J – "Crystal Meth", Sun Zoo – "Get Down", Planet Asia, Thoth & Mistah Fab – "Turn Heads"

Disc 2

- Tracks: D-Black – "Busy Makin Money", MokeOut & Tone – "Respect" f. Crooked I & Mr. Met, Smokes – "I Get High", Elion The Great – "Get It In", I.F. – "You’re OK" f. Skyzoo & D “SkyHigh” McClain, Rita J – "Body Rock" f. J.C. Brooks, Flipstarr – "Don’t Let The Sun Set", MindsOne – "Keep Building", Hydroponikz – "Ain’t I", Pat-Lee – "So Good", Head Stimulata – "Move", Ron Verbal – "Nothing 2 Lose", James Dean – "Stick To My Guns", Sonny Jim – "The Purple Patch pt.3", Jesse Abraham – "Raucous Lawlessness", Skyzoo – "Speakers On Blast (Remix)" f. Lloyd Banks & Maino

== Upcoming projects ==
- 2013: No Malice & Ab-Liva - Hear Ye Him & The Truth Shall Set You Free (2013)
  - "Smoke & Mirrors"

== See also ==
- !llmind
