= Illmind =

American record producer (born 1980)

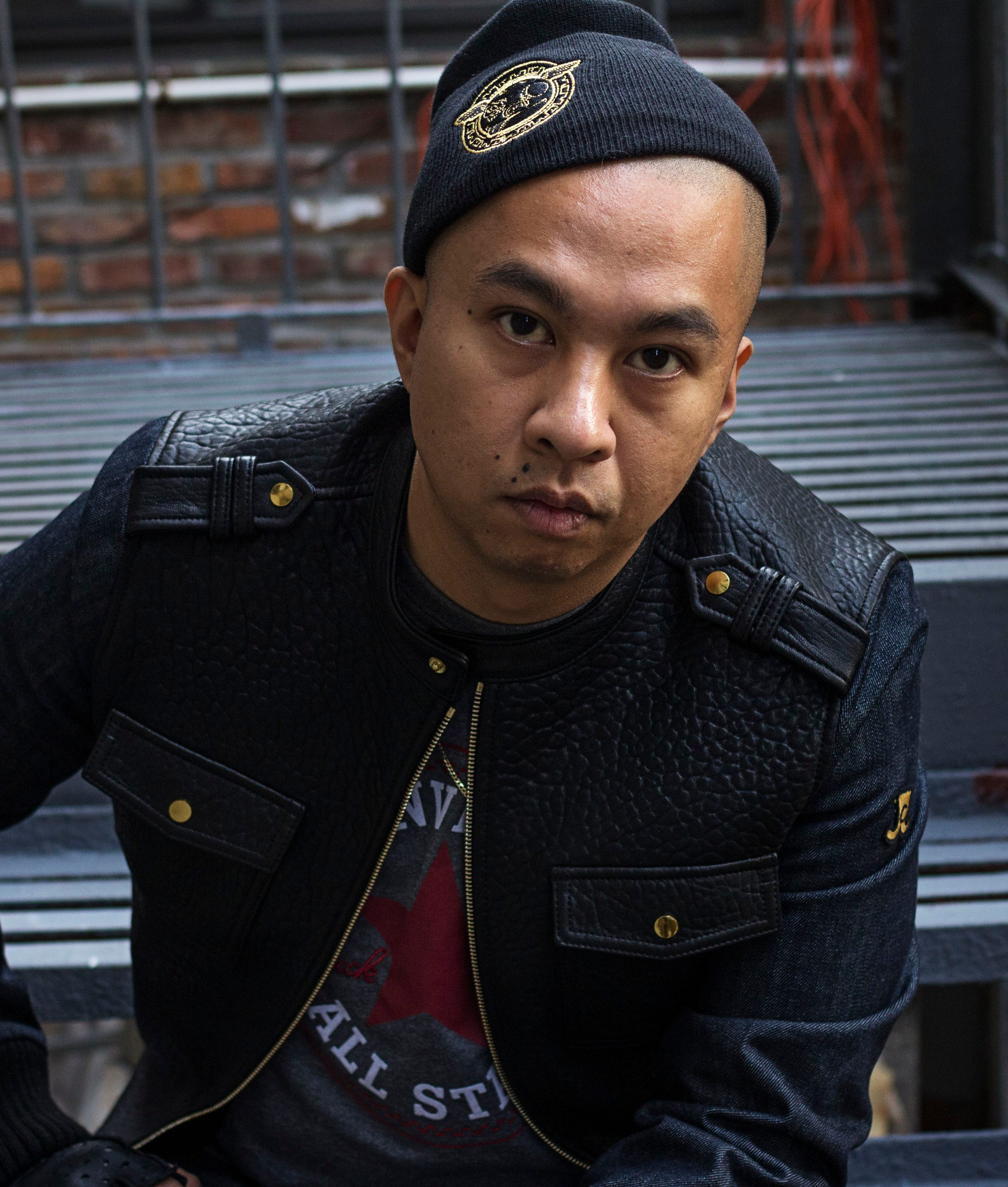
- Ibanga in 2012

Background information
- Also known as: The Filipino Pimp
- Born: Ramon Ibanga, Jr. August 28, 1980 (age 46); Newark, New Jersey, U.S.
- Origin: Bloomfield, New Jersey, U.S.
- Genres: Hip hop; trap; pop; soul; k-pop
- Occupations: Record producer; songwriter; educator
- Instruments: Reason; Pro Tools; keyboard; sampler
- Years active: 1999–present
- Labels: Roseville Music; Nature Sounds; Duck Down; BBE
- Website: www.illmindproducer.com

Ramon Ibanga, Jr. (born August 28, 1980), known professionally as Illmind (often stylized as !llmind), is an American record producer, songwriter, and educator. As of 2012, he lives in Brooklyn, New York.

Illmind has co-written and produced hip hop, trap, pop, soul, and electronic music for labels such as Cash Money, Def Jam, and Aftermath, and has worked with artists such as Nicki Minaj, Andy Mineo, Kanye West, Drake, Stormzy, Jay-Z, J. Cole, Dr. Dre, Ludacris, 50 Cent, Ariana Grande, and others. His accomplishments in 2016 include production on the new Hamilton Mixtape and Disney's Moana, both created by Lin-Manuel Miranda. Illmind has released several studio albums and had a number of songs and albums reach the music charts.

His most recent album, Human, is a collaboration with Joell Ortiz, and was released on July 17, 2015. He established his own multi-genre music company Roseville Music Group in 2014.

== Early life ==
Ramon Ibanga, Jr. was born on August 28, 1980 in New Jersey, where he was raised in the city of Newark, New Jersey before later moving with his family to Bloomfield, New Jersey. His family provided a strong musical background, as his father was a musician and his older brother Les-Paul was even named after the late Les Paul.

Illmind started using his father's equipment to make beats around age 13, specifically learning MIDI and sequencing on a Roland KR-500 keyboard. In his early teens he developed an interest in hip hop, and started producing music in 1997.

Around 1999, he began to take production more seriously and he started sampling, using both hip hop vinyl and obscure records such as his father's old jazz and soul albums from the Philippines. He began using the program Cubase and an Akai S20 sampler around age 17.

== Music career ==
=== Production ===
After learning sampling, Illmind began making his own beats and sounds, and in 1999 began uploading his music to online forums such as undergroundhiphop.com. Around 2001 he started participating in the Beat Society producer showcases in Philadelphia.

Illmind started his production career working with groups like Little Brother and Boot Camp Clik; he met Boot Camp Clik after being introduced through Khrysis, and he started working with Little Brother after being introduced to their music around 2000. His first official collaborative release with the latter was Nobody Like Me.

In March 2004 Illmind's remix of the Jay-Z's Black Album, called The Black and Tan Album, was released to a positive review in The New York Times, who stated "Sparse is the aesthetic for !llmind's remixes, which set out to do more with less: techno boops, ticking drums, laid-back bass lines, three or four notes from a guitar or keyboard. Illmind's minimalism makes Jay-Z sound almost nonchalant." Sha Money XL, a G-Unit executive, served as Illmind's manager for several years. During this time, Illmind went on to produce songs with Erykah Badu, 50 Cent, Ludacris, Lloyd Banks, Prodigy, Kool G Rap, Redman, Scarface, LL Cool J, El Da Sensei, Diamond D, KRS-One, and others. He produced the 2008 Akrobatik hip hop album Absolute Value.

In summer of 2012, Illmind's track "The Morning" was included on Cruel Summer, a compilation album released on Kanye West's G.O.O.D. Music label. The song peaked at 19 on the US Billboard Bubbling Under Hot 100 Singles chart, and 49 on Hot R&B/Hip-Hop Songs.

The genesis of the track was 2007, when Illmind met Chicago-rapper Rhymefest and started sending him beats. "For a couple of years, I just kept sending him stuff whenever I had Kanye or him in mind. It must have been 100 beats. And then I get a phone call ... from Rhymefest ... asking for a session to a beat I made. Then he was like, 'I think Kanye wants to use this for a Pusha T song.' Then a few hours later, he's like 'We got Raekwon on this.' The first time I heard the complete album was when it leaked. And I heard it, and I lost it. I would say my life has definitely changed since that moment."

In 2008 he won the Philadelphia Red Bull Big Tune Beat Battle. Since 2012, he has shared the stage in beat showcases with artists such as Kanye West, Just Blaze, Nottz, and Don Cannon. Illmind produced music for Hoodie Allen's mixtape, Crew Cuts. The single "Cake Boy" premiered on February 11, 2013 via YouTube with over 30,000 views in the first day.

In 2015, Illmind helped Skyzoo on the album Music for My Friends, producing five tracks. and helping Skyzoo co-produce the track "Luxury". He was executive producer for Andy Mineo's album, Uncomfortable, which released on September 18.

Towards the end of 2016, Illmind produced the outro credits for Disney's Moana, a track titled "You're Welcome", featuring both Lin-Manuel Miranda and Jordan Fisher.

Beyond his work on the Disney project the producer took an active role in working on The Hamilton Mixtape, released via Atlantic Records. In addition to his work on the project with artists such as Nas, Common, The Roots, Ingrid Michaelson, and others, Illmind has his own track, "Take a Break – Interlude", on the album.

In 2017, Illmind worked with Future, Khalid, Lil Uzi Vert, Bryson Tiller, A Boogie wit da Hoodie, Meek Mill, and others on their respective major label releases.

In 2018, Illmind worked with Beyonce and Jay-Z on the album Everything Is Love, to co-produce the song "Heard About Us" with Boi-1da, and also produced "Bigger Than You" with 2 Chainz.

=== Studio albums ===
In 2005, he produced and released an entire album on the label BBE with fellow producer Symbolyc One called The Art Of Onemind, which featured artists such as Ghostface Killah. He released The Official !llmind Remix Album in 2009 on myx, and a 2010 LP with lyricist Skyzoo called Live From The Tape Deck on Duck Down Records.

"I wanted to keep the soundscape warm and 'analog' sounding [for Live from the Tape Deck], just like how 2-inch tapes used to sound. Most of the keyboard and synth sounds I used were from analog synths made in the late 80's. Combined this with using my ASR-10, I was able to capture that feeling, but with a slightly updated feel."
— !llmind in 2010

In May 2010, lyricist and rapper Skyzoo had announced that he and Illmind were collaborating on an album called Live from the Tape Deck. Recording sessions took place at Big China Studios in Brooklyn, New York in 2010. The entire album was produced, mixed and arranged by Illmind, and was mastered by Ricardo Gutierrez.!

Live from the Tape Deck debuted at #3 on the Billboard Top Heatseekers Albums. The album entered the Top Rap Albums, peaking at #16, as well as entering at #30 on the Top Independent Albums and #33 on the Top R&B/Hip-Hop Albums. The album was met with positive reviews from music critics. Spin's Mosi Reeves gave the album a seven out of ten, saying: "On this duo's debut full-length, Skyzoo was nicely complemented by !llmind's production, which ranges from the Dilla-like soul loop of "#Allaboutthat" to the fuzzy '70s-cop-show funk of 'The Now or Never.' Live from the Tape Deck is full of stolid striver anthems...but the album's meat-and-potatoes consistency remains bracing throughout."

Beh!nd the Curta!n, Illmind's first official instrumental album, came out on April 19, 2011 through Brooklyn-based Nature Sounds Records. He followed this up with the second instrumental album #BoomTrap EP, an eight-track EP released in January of 2014. He shortly after released the drum kit #BoomTrap "The Drums", which includes extracts from the EP. Only 200 copies of the kit were offered. His most recent album, Human, is a collaboration with Joell Ortiz, and will be released on July 17, 2015.

== Business and teaching ==
!llmind has been featured in magazines and online publications such as Scratch Magazine (Top 20 Best Producers), Hip Hop Weekly, Mass Appeal, The Source, XXL, Hiphopgame.com, and Hiphopdx.com. In the summer of 2012 !llmind started offering consulting services as a member the online service Blazetrak, and he later formed an independent online consultation service.

As of July 2012, Illmind was a senior contributor at BeatTips.com. He taught music production at the non-profit organization Harlem Children’s Zone from 2007–09, and he was later hired by the Clive Davis Department Of Recorded Music at NYU as a Technical Music Instructor for a program called "Future Music Moguls."

He is active in the producer community as an educator and business man. Beyond launching a drum kit business, he has launched a "Pass The Aux", workshop series, and is committed to daily one on one interaction with the upcoming producer community.

== Style and equipment ==
"I can’t define my sound. What I can say is that it’s honest, musical, and inspired/channeled from a “feeling”. I was always fascinated by music, feeling, and vision, all in one. When I’m creating music, I’m actually envisioning things as I’m going along, like places or people."
— !llmind

Illmind has called himself a fan of producers such as J Dilla and Pete Rock, but writes and produces a variety of genres. About his style, he has stated "I just try to create the music I like, period. I've got a pretty diverse taste in music, so I’m managing to not get bored, which is awesome. There's a lot of talent out there, and I think that’s what continues to drive me as well."!

== Discography ==
=== Studio albums ===
Year	Title	Album details	Peak chart positions			
Year	Title	Album details	US	US R&B/HH	US Rap	US Ind
2005	The Art of OneMind (with Symbolyc One)	Released: 2005; Label: Barely Breaking Even; Format: Digital download	—	—	—	—
2009	The Official !llmind Remix Album	Released: 2009; Label: myx; Format: Digital download	—	—	—	—
2010	Live from the Tape Deck (with Skyzoo)	Released: October 5, 2010; Label: Duck Down; Format: Digital download	3	33	16	30
2011	Behind the Curtain	Released: April 19, 2011; Label: Nature Sounds; Format: Digital download	—	—	—	—
2014	#BoomTrap EP	Released: January 2014; Label: Roseville Music Group; Format: Digital download	—	—	—	—
2015	Human (with Joell Ortiz)	Released: July 17, 2015; Label: Roseville Music Group; Format: Digital download				
2021	1176 (with Guapdad 4000)	Released: March 19, 2021; Label: Paradise Rising, 88rising; Format: Digital download, streaming	—	—	—	—

=== Mixtapes ===
- 2008: Blaps, Rhymes & Life
- 2009: Blaps, Rhymes & Life, Vol II
- 2009: Blaps, Rhymes & Life, Vol III
- 2009: Blaps, Rhymes & Life, Vol IV
- 2011: Blaps, Rhymes & Life, Vol V

=== Selected production credits ===
==== Peak chart positions ====
Singles produced by !llmind, with selected singles chart positions
Year	Song title	Song details	Chart peaks	
Year	Song title	Song details	US Bub.	US R&B/HH
2012	"The Morning"	Album title: Cruel Summer; Label: Def Jam, GOOD Music	19	49

Albums with tracks produced by !llmind, with selected album chart positions
Year	Album title	Album/song details	Chart peaks			
Year	Album title	Album/song details	US	US R&B/HH	US Rap	US Ind
2006	The Last Stand (by Boot Camp Clik)	Tracks: "Let's Go"; Label: Duck Down	—	48	—	20
2007	Nu-Mixx Klazzics Vol. 2 (by 2Pac)	Tracks: "What'z Ya Phone # [Nu Mixx]"; Label: Tha Row/Koch	45	8	—	2
2008	Emeritus (by Scarface)	Tracks: "It's Not A Game," "Who Are They"; Label: Rap-a-Lot	24	4	—	—
2014	2014 Forest Hills Drive (by J. Cole)	Tracks: "Love Yourz"; Label: Dreamville Records	1	1	1	—
2015	If You're Reading This It's Too Late (by Drake)	Tracks: "You & the 6"; Label: Cash Money	1	1	1	—
2015	The Beast Is G-Unit (by G-Unit)	Tracks: Boy Boy; Label: G-Unit Records	27	3	3	2
2015	Ludaversal (by Ludacris)	Tracks: "Lyrical Healing," "Charge It to the Rap Game"; Label: Def Jam	3	2	2	—

The following is an incomplete list of albums and singles produced by Illmind.

- 2003: Fish Outta Water: The Remixes by Grand Agent – track "Plans To Blow (!llmind Remix)"
- 2003: Balance by Akrobatik – track "Remind My Soul"
- 2004: "Panthers" by The Last Poets, Dead Prez & Common – track "Panthers (!llmind Remix)"
- 2004: Shades Of Grey by Braille – track "Nobody"
- 2004: The Deadline by Supastition – 2 tracks
- 2005: The Raw by Saigon, Inspectah Deck & Bekay – track "The Raw (Ill Side)"
- 2005: Lost Dreams, Wasted Talent by Fel Sweetenberg – track "Lost Children (!llmind Remix)"
- 2005: Opportunity Knocks by Muneshine – 4 tracks
- 2005: The Chittlin Circuit 1.5 by Little Brother – 2 tracks
- 2005: Raks (Verses) The Industry by Raks One – 3 tracks
- 2005: True Links EP by Edgar Allen Floe – track "I For An I"
- 2005: Chain Letters by Supastition – 8 tracks
- 2005: Unreleased Remixes Vol. 1 by Supastition – track "Adrenile (!llmind Remix)"
- 2006: Long Live The Cauze Vol I by Reef The Lost Cauze – track "Get Lost"
- 2006: The Soul Of Benjamin Banneker In The Age Of The Aquarius by Infinito 2017 – track "A Free Man's Soul"
- 2006: Word On The Street by Kaze – track "Shut Up"
- 2006: The Unusual by El Da Sensei – 2 tracks
- 2006: Starr Status by Kenn Starr – 2 tracks
- 2006: The Last Stand by Boot Camp Clik – track "Let's Go"
- 2006: The Healing by Strange Fruit Project – 3 tracks
- 2007: Jesus Price Supastar by Sean Price – track "Cardiac"
- 2007: Of Gods And Girls by Mr. J. Medeiros – track "Change"
- 2007: Border Blockerz Pt. 1 by Pumpkinhead – track "Best Rappers Out"
- 2007: Nu Mixx Klazzics Vol. 2: Evolution: Duets & Remixes by 2Pac – track "What'z Ya Phone # (Nu Mixx)"
- 2007: Getback by Little Brother – 4 tracks
- 2007: For Good by Raks One – 2 tracks
- 2008: Carnage by Chaundon – track "Selfish"
- 2008: Absolute Value by Akrobatik – 4 tracks
- 2008: Leave Of Absence EP by Supastition – track "Thankful"
- 2008: D.I.R.T. (Da Incredible Rap Team) by Heltah Skeltah- 2 tracks
- 2008: The Huge Hefner Chronicles by Diamond D – track "Don't Beg"
- 2008: Exact Change by Bambu – track "Quit"
- 2008: Emeritus by Scarface – 2 tracks
- 2008: Holla Burton (The UnMixed Cassette) by Silent Knight – 3 tracks
- 2009: Recession Proof by Emilio Rojas – 2 tracks
- 2009: The Delightful Bars (The North American Pie Version) by Rapper Big Pooh – track roblems"
- 2009: Open House by The Residents – track "Something Like"
- 2009: Survival Skills by KRS-One & Buckshot – 3 tracks
- 2009: The Second Inning EP by Triple Play – 2 tracks
- 2009: The Salvation by Skyzoo – track "Dear Whoever"
- 2009: Radio In My Head by Jared Evan – 3 tracks
- 2010: Crown of Thorns by Rakaa Iriscience – track "Mezcal"
- 2010: Self Reliance by MindsOne – track "Keep Building"
- 2010: No Excuses by Chaundon – 2 tracks
- 2010: Life Without Shame by Emilio Rojas – track "Champion"
- 2010: ¥€$ v.1 by Y.E.S. – track "Job Well Done"
- 2010: The Life and Times of Peter Nelson by Copywrite – 2 tracks
- 2010: Pancake & Syrup by Redman – track "Fly"
- 2011: Back and Fourth by Jared Evan – track "Falling Down"
- 2011: The Big 10 by 50 Cent – track "Stop Cryin'"
- 2011: For the Record by Torae – track "What It Sound Like"
- 2012: The Lost Tape by 50 Cent – 2 tracks
- 2012: Cruel Summer by G.O.O.D. Music – track "The Morning"
- 2012: A Dream Deferred by Skyzoo – 4 tracks
- 2014: 2014 Forest Hills Drive by J. Cole – track "Love Yourz"
- 2014: Barrel Brothers by Skyzoo and Torae – 3 tracks
- 2015: Music For My Friends by Skyzoo – 5 tracks
- 2015: Ludaversal by Ludacris – two tracks
- 2015: If You're Reading This It's Too Late by Drake – track "You & the 6"
- 2015: The Beast Is G-Unit by G-Unit – track "Boy Boy"
- 2015: The Kanan Tape by 50 Cent – track "On Everything"
- 2016: Entitled by Torae – track "Troubled Times"
- 2018: Slimeball 3 by Young Nudy - track "Friday" with Cardiak
- 2026: Day by Day, Shway Shway by MC Abdul – two tracks

== See also ==
- List of hip hop musicians
- List of record producers
