= Barrel Brothers =

Studio album by Skyzoo and Torae
- Released: May 27, 2014
- Recorded: 2013–14
- Genre: Hip-hop
- Length: 45:43
- Label: First Generation Rich, Inc.; Internal Affairs; Loyalty Digital Corp.
- Producer: Torae (exec.); Skyzoo (also exec.); Auréli1 a.k.a. Tiga; AntMan Wonder; Black Milk; DJ Premier; Illmind; Jahlil Beats; Khrysis; MarcNfinit; Oh No; Praise; The Stuyvesants; Apollo Brown

Skyzoo chronology
A Dream Deferred (2012)	Barrel Brothers (2014)	Music for My Friends (2015)

Torae chronology
For the Record (2011)	Barrel Brothers (2014)	Entitled (2016)

Singles from Barrel Brothers
- 1. "Blue Yankee Fitted" Released: April 24, 2014

Professional ratings
Review scores
Source	Rating
HipHopDX	4/5
RapReviews	7.5/10
XXL	L (3/5)

Barrel Brothers is a collaborative studio album by American rappers Skyzoo and Torae. It was released on May 27, 2014 via First Generation Rich, Inc./Internal Affairs/Loyalty Digital Corp. Production was handled by Illmind, Antman Wonder, Auréli1 a.k.a. Tiga, Black Milk, DJ Premier, Jahlil Beats, Khrysis, MarcNfinit, Oh No, Praise and The Stuyvesants. It features guest appearances from Blu, Guilty Simpson, Livin Proof, Sean Price and Sha Stimuli.

"Rediscover" ft. Blu
"Rediscover" was produced by MarcNfinit and features several vocalists including Blu

The album managed to reach several Billboard charts, peaking at No. 196 on the Current Album Sales, No. 29 on the Top R&B/Hip-Hop Albums, No. 16 on the Top Rap Albums, No. 40 on the Independent Albums and No. 8 on the Heatseekers Albums.

== Track listing ==
No.	Title	Producer(s)	Length
1.	"Intro"	Skyzoo	1:08
2.	"Talk of the Town"	Oh No	3:07
3.	"Make You a Believer"	Jahlil Beats	3:25
4.	"Tunnel Vision"	Illmind	3:29
5.	"Blue Yankee Fitted"	Illmind	4:00
6.	"All in Together" (featuring Guilty Simpson and Sean Price)	Black Milk	4:15
7.	"Triangle Offense" (featuring Sha Stimuli)	Illmind	2:50
8.	"Movie Album" (Skit)	Auréli1 a.k.a. Tiga	3:58
9.	"Albee Square Mall" (featuring Livin' Proof)	Praise	4:19
10.	"The Hand Off"	Khrysis	2:06
11.	"4 Bar Friday"	The Stuyvesants	2:24
12.	"Memorabilia"	AntMan Wonder	2:50
13.	"Rediscover" (featuring Blu)	MarcNfinit	3:31
14.	"The Aura"	DJ Premier	4:21
Total length:			45:43

Bonus tracks
No.	Title	Producer(s)	Length
15.	"Got It from Here"	Apollo Brown	2:43
16.	"Double the Monsters"	Marco Polo	2:27
Total length:			50:53

== Charts ==
Chart (2014)	Peak position
US Current Album Sales (Billboard)	196
US Top R&B/Hip-Hop Albums (Billboard)	29
US Top Rap Albums (Billboard)	16
US Independent Albums (Billboard)	40
US Heatseekers Albums (Billboard)	8
