= Music for My Friends =

Studio album by Skyzoo
- Released: June 23, 2015
- Recorded: 2014–2015
- Genre: Hip-hop
- Length: 1:07:33
- Label: First Generation Rich
- Producers: AntMan Wonder; Apollo Brown; Black Metaphor; Illmind; Jahlil Beats; MarcNfinit; Seige Monstracity; Skyzoo; Thelonious Martin; The Rvlt.

Skyzoo chronology
Barrel Brothers (2014)	Music for My Friends (2015)	The Easy Truth (2016)

Singles from Music for My Friends
- 1. "Suicide Doors" Released: May 5, 2015

Music for My Friends is the third solo studio album by American rapper Skyzoo. It was released on June 23, 2015 via First Generation Rich, Inc. Production was handled by Illmind, MarcNfinit, Thelonious Martin, Antman Wonder, Apollo Brown, Black Metaphor, Jahlil Beats, Seige Monstracity, The Rvlt., and Skyzoo himself. It features guest appearances from Kay Cola, Bilal, Black Thought, Christon Gray, Jadakiss, Mozaic, Saba, Skarr Akbar and Westside Gunn. In the United States, the album peaked at number 36 on the Top R&B/Hip-Hop Albums and number 15 on the Heatseekers Albums charts.

== Background ==
The LP is based on the themes of growing up at 13 years old and seeing the world based on the morals learned at that age. Its cover art commissioned by comic book illustrator Chris B. Murray. The song "Suicide Doors" was released as a single on May 5, 2015. A music video was released for the song "Luxury".

== Critical reception ==
Professional ratings
Aggregate scores
Source	Rating
Metacritic	81/100
Review scores
Source	Rating
Exclaim!	8/10
HipHopDX	4/5
RapReviews	7/10
XXL	XL (4/5)

Music for My Friends was met with universal acclaim from music critics. At Metacritic, which assigns a normalized rating out of 100 to reviews from mainstream publications, the album received an average score of 81 based on four reviews.

Del F. Cowie of Exclaim! called the album "arguably Skyzoo's finest project to date", while Homer Johnsen of HipHopDX labeled it "above-average effort from Skyzoo". Roger Krastz of XXL resumed: "overall, Music For My Friends is another solid offering from Skyzoo that hip-hop purists will appreciate". Grant Jones of RapReviews wrote: "it's not as consistently good as The Salvation, or as instantly satisfying as his work with Torae, but with recent months slowing down on the incredible start we've had in 2015 for albums, this is certainly worth checking out".

== Track listing ==
No.	Title	Producer(s)	Length
1.	"All Day, Always"	AntMan Wonder	3:13
2.	"Suicide Doors"	MarcNfinit	4:52
3.	"The Moments That Matter" (featuring Kay Cola)	Jahlil Beats; AntMan Wonder (co.)	3:48
4.	"Luxury" (featuring Westside Gunn)	Skyzoo	3:42
5.	"Everything's for Sale"	!llmind	4:31
6.	"See a Key (Ki)" (featuring Jadakiss)	Thelonious Martin	4:40
7.	"Money Makes Us Happy" (featuring Black Thought and Bilal)	The Rvlt.	5:25
8.	"Playing Favorites" (featuring Christon Gray)	!llmind	4:11
9.	"Meadow of Trust" (featuring Saba)	Black Metaphor	3:45
10.	"Women Who Can Cook"	Thelonious Martin	4:10
11.	"Civilized Leisure" (featuring MoZaic)	!llmind	3:56
12.	"The Experience"	MarcNfinit	3:36
13.	"Asking Bodie for a Package" (featuring Skarr Akbar)	!llmind	5:18
14.	"Things I Should've Told My Friends"	Apollo Brown	5:35
15.	"Sweet Pursuit" (featuring Kay Cola)	Seige Monstracity	6:53
Total length:			1:07:33

iTunes bonus track
No.	Title	Producer(s)	Length
16.	"Falling Out the Sky"	Praise	3:46

Vinyl and cassette bonus track
No.	Title	Producer(s)	Length
17.	"Hands Folded Together" (featuring Elzhi)	DJ Prince	3:34

== Charts ==
Chart (2015)	Peak position
US Top R&B/Hip-Hop Albums (Billboard)	36
US Heatseekers Albums (Billboard)	15
