= Live from the Tape Deck =

Studio album by Skyzoo and Illmind
- Released: October 5, 2010
- Recorded: 2010
- Studio: Big China Studios (Brooklyn, New York)
- Genre: Hip hop
- Length: 42:32
- Label: Duck Down
- Producer: Illmind; Skyzoo

Skyzoo chronology
The Salvation (2009)	Live from the Tape Deck (2010)	A Dream Deferred (2012)

Illmind chronology
Live from the Tape Deck (2010)	Behind the Curtain (2010)

Singles from Live from the Tape Deck
- 1. "Frisbees" Released: July 13, 2010; 2. "Speakers On Blast" Released: August 30, 2010

Live from the Tape Deck is the collaborative studio album by Brooklyn rapper Skyzoo and New Jersey producer Illmind, released on October 5, 2010 by Duck Down Records and distributed through E1 Entertainment. It was preceded by Skyzoo's first studio album, The Salvation (2009), although it isn't its follow-up. The album serves as a prelude to his second studio album A Dream Deferred (2012).

Recording sessions for the album took place at Big China Studios in Brooklyn, New York in 2010. The record was entirely produced by Illmind and features guest appearances from Buckshot, Torae, Styles P, Rhymefest and Heltah Skeltah. The album's release was supported by two singles – "Frisbees" and "Speakers on Blast."

Live from the Tape Deck debuted at #3 on the Billboard Top Heatseekers Albums. The album entered the Top Rap Albums, peaking at #16, as well as entering at #30 on the Top Independent Albums and #33 on the Top R&B/Hip-Hop Albums. The album was also met with positive reviews from music critics.

== Conception ==
=== Background ===
In May 2010, after almost a year since releasing his critically acclaimed debut album The Salvation (2009), Skyzoo announced that he has joined forces with acclaimed record producer/beatsmith Illmind for an album he entitled Live from the Tape Deck. In an interview for HipHop DX in June 2010, the Brooklyn emcee also clarified that this project isn't the follow-up to The Salvation. "It's leading up to the second album [...] It's not the second album because I didn't want to just rush out with another album right away." Skyzoo believes that experience is the best teacher. "I felt like I needed to live in order to have something to write about because I write about what I am living. However, we live in a blog world, here today gone today. So you have to keep your name on the blogs. With that being said, you gotta keep music out there. So the happy medium was 'okay let’s put out a project to keep the buzz going and the fans lined up without it being a second album.' The second album is going to be called A Dream Deferred and it's going back to what The Salvation was."

Unlike Skyzoo's critically acclaimed debut album The Salvation (2009), there aren't any deep undertones or personal records in Live from the Tape Deck. The album is a collection of "raw" hip hop with a cohesive backdrop. With this project, Skyzoo and Illmind have planned to bring what hip hop veterans such as Eric B. & Rakim, Gang Starr, EPMD, N.W.A and A Tribe Called Quest brought by having one producer with one sound and one theme. Yet, Live from the Tape Deck isn't a throw back to the sound of the 1990s.

While composing Live from the Tape Deck, Skyzoo wanted the content to be raw and lyric driven as always, but not as story driven or emotional as his previous album was. There are still parts of the album that are stories and concepts, but not as much as his debut had. This one is more of a "beats and rhymes" type of album.

=== Title significance ===
Skyzoo's goal while recording the album was "to make something that felt like a 2010 cassette tape." He further explained why he named the project Live from the Tape Deck: "[...] When labels made cassette tapes, it just so happens that was when records were dope. Once the option of buying a cassette in a store was gone, that's when things changed and music got whack."

== Music ==
=== Recording and production ===
Live from the Tape Deck was recorded at Big China Studios in Brooklyn, New York in 2010. The album was produced, mixed and arranged by Illmind, and was mastered by Ricardo Gutierrez. Illmind took a custom approach to the production for the album based on Skyzoo's concept of Live from the Tape Deck, explaining that "I wanted to keep the soundscape warm and 'analog' sounding, just like how 2-inch tapes used to sound. Most of the keyboard and synth sounds I used were from analog synths made in the late 80's. Combined this with using my ASR-10, I was able to capture that feeling, but with a slightly updated feel. I think our debut record, "Frisbees" was a cool way, sonically, to introduce the sound I was going for."

=== Guest performers ===
Skyzoo and Illmind secured features from artists that matched the Live from the Tape Deck concept. These artists are Heltah Skeltah, Torae, Styles P, Buckshot and Rhymefest. Skyzoo goes further saying: "I went to who I felt made sense for the records I put them on. For instance, when fans hear the track, "The Burn Notice," they’ll agree that the beat, being chaotic and loud, had Heltah Skeltah written all over it."

== Singles ==
The album's lead single, "Frisbees," was released on July 13, 2010. Its music video premiered on July 29, 2010. It was directed by Derek Pike. The second single, "Speakers On Blast," was released on August 30, 2010 and is Skyzoo's biggest hit to date. The Derek Pike-directed video premiered on MTV on October 6, 2010. The remix, featuring fellow New York rappers Lloyd Banks and Maino, was released on November 22, 2010.

== Critical reception ==
Professional ratings
Review scores
Source	Rating
DJBooth.net	4/5 stars
HipHopDX	3.5/5 stars
RapReviews	9/10
The Smoking Section	4/5 stars
Spin	7/10
Urb	3.5/5 stars
XXL	4/5 (XL)

Upon its release, Live from the Tape Deck was met with positive reviews from music critics. SPIN's Mosi Reeves gave the album a seven out of ten, saying: "On this duo's debut full-length, [Skyzoo]'s nicely complemented by Illmind's production, which ranges from the Dilla-like soul loop of "#Allaboutthat" to the fuzzy '70s-cop-show funk of "The Now or Never." Live from the Tape Deck is full of stolid striver anthems; Skyzoo even bases a song on LeBron James' controversial "The Decision" broadcast ("Winners Circle"). But the album's meat-and-potatoes consistency remains bracing throughout." Adam Fleischer of XXL gave the album an XL, and an XXL for its lyrics, saying: "Considering the winning appeal of this LP, [Skyzoo has] at least found his D-Wade to take along for the ride."

RapReviews founder, Steve 'Flash' Juon, gave the album a nine out of ten, saying: "Even the littlest details on Live from the Tape Deck are perfect, like the sound of shaking up and spraying out a can on "Krylon" - it's as though The Artifacts are throwing up a burner while you listen. Guests are few and far between but Skyzoo is such a talent that he doesn't really need the support; still when it comes in the form of Buckshot and Styles P on "The Now or Never" you definitely won't be hating on it. The only bad part of Live from the Tape Deck is that it's 12 songs and 43 minutes long. When you get on a vibe this good you get hooked like a morphine addict and you want that feeling to last, and you can't wait to have it again. If you want to go old school get a 90-minute cassette and dub this sh-t off twice front to back, then pop it in your stereo and hit the autoreverse button so it stays looped. Better hope that the tape don't pop while you're sippin' on Private Stock. This is the new old school, so far ahead it's actually going way back." Nathan S. of DJBooth.net gave the album four out of five stars, saying: "Unless you've got a DeLorean and a Mr. Fusion laying around we can't really go back to the days of the tape deck, nor would we want to. Ultimately I believe hip-hop's stronger than ever in the digital age, but in the rush to hear more music, faster, we've lost something crucial; the pure joy of holding an album in your hands, pressing play for the first time and becoming completely immersed in the music. Live from the Tape Deck won't singlehandedly restore that joy to the game, but it'll brings us decidely [sic] closer, and for that hip-hop lovers owe Skyzoo and !llmind some props."

URB reviewer M.F. DiBella gave the album a 3.5 out of five, saying: "The blueprint of a phenomenal album is fully in place (an economical 12 tracks, one of the better producers in the game Humphrey Bogart'ing the boards and features that make you want to forgo sequencing), but sadly nothing is new under the sun, dun. Even the most ardent hip-hop artist is himself a critic, it's a culture predicated on pitted schools of thought. Oh, the guilt. Still, there is enough to redeem this effort to overlook that which it lacks. Just one aging head's opinion." Edwin Ortiz of HipHop DX gave the album a 3.5 out of five, saying: "Much like label-mates 9th Wonder & Buckshot or Marco Polo & Torae, we can only hope !llmind and Skyzoo continue their collaborative efforts into the future. Both are great at their craft, and likewise have a clear drive to get better. Make no mistake, Live from the Tape Deck is worthy of your car stereo, iPod, CD player, or for heaven's sake, your tape deck."

== Track listing ==
All tracks are produced by Illmind.

No.	Title	Writer(s)	Length
1.	"Digital Analog / Intro"	Gregory Taylor, Ramon Ibanga Jr.	1:01
2.	"Frisbees"	Taylor, Ibanga Jr.	3:41
3.	"The Burn Notice" (featuring Heltah Skeltah)	Taylor, Ibanga Jr., Sean Price, Jahmal Bush	3:51
4.	"Speakers on Blast"	Taylor, Ibanga Jr.	3:29
5.	"#Allabouthat"	Taylor, Ibanga Jr.	3:01
6.	"Barrel Brothers" (featuring Torae)	Taylor, Ibanga Jr., Torae Carr	3:17
7.	"The Winner's Circle"	Taylor, Ibanga Jr.	3:52
8.	"Krylon"	Taylor, Ibanga Jr.	3:25
9.	"Kitchen Table"	Taylor, Ibanga Jr.	4:56
10.	"The Now or Never" (featuring Styles P & Buckshot)	Taylor, Ibanga Jr., David Styles, Kenyatta Blake	3:21
11.	"Understanding Riley" (featuring Rhymefest)	Taylor, Ibanga Jr.	3:10
12.	"Langston's Pen"	Taylor, Ibanga Jr.	3:04
Total length:			42:32

iTunes bonus track
No.	Title	Writer(s)	Length
13.	"Flow by Numbers" (featuring Termanology)	Taylor, Ibanga Jr., Daniel Carrillo	3:52
Total length:			46:24

Notes

- "Speakers on Blast" features additional vocals from Rapsody and Torae.
- "Digital Analog", "The Burn Notice" and "Krylon" features additional guitars from Gabriel.

Sample credits

- "Frisbees" contains a sample of "Laying Eggs" as performed by Paz, and "Dune" by The Wonderland Philharmonic.
- "Barrel Brothers" contains a sample of "(It Would Almost) Drive Me Out of My Mind" as performed by Four Tops.
- "The Now Or Never" contains a sample of "Supersnatch" as performed by Frankie Miller.
- "#Allabouthat" contains a sample of "Do You Love Me Just a Little, Honey" as performed by Gladys Knight & The Pips.

== Credits and personnel ==
Credits for Live from the Tape Deck adapted from AllMusic and from the album liner notes.

- Gregory "Skyzoo" Taylor – primary artist, composer, vocals, lyrics, executive producer
- Ramon "Illmind" Ibanga Jr. – primary artist, arranger, composer, engineer, mixing, producer, executive producer
- Kenyatta "Buckshot" Blake – associate executive producer, featured vocals
- Matt Conaway – publicity
- Noah "Noha" Friedman – project coordinator
- Gabriel – additional guitars on "Digital Analog", "The Burn Notice" and "Krylon"
- Ricardo Gutierrez – mastering
- Jean Goode – artwork
- Drew "Dru-Ha" Friedman – associate executive producer
- David "Styles P" Styles – featured vocals, lyrics
- Marlanna "Rapsody" Evans – additional vocals on "Speakers on Blast"
- Che "Rhymefest" Smith – featured vocals, lyrics
- Heltah Skeltah – featured vocals, lyrics
- Skrilla – additional artwork
- Torae "Torae" Carr – featured vocals, lyrics, additional vocals on "Speakers on Blast"
- Andre Trenier – illustrations

== Charts ==
Chart (2010)	Peak position
US Top Heatseekers Albums	3
US Top Independent Albums	30
US Top R&B/Hip-Hop Albums	33
US Top Rap Albums	16
