= Cloud 9: The 3 Day High =

Studio album by Skyzoo & 9th Wonder
- Released: September 12, 2006
- Recorded: 2006
- Genre: Hip Hop
- Label: Traffic Entertainment
- Producer: 9th Wonder

Skyzoo & 9th Wonder chronology
Cloud 9: The 3 Day High (2006)	The Salvation (2009)

Cloud 9: The 3 Day High is a collaborative album from Brooklyn rapper Skyzoo and North Carolina producer 9th Wonder. It was released on September 12, 2006 on Traffic Entertainment. Cloud 9: The 3 Day High reportedly took a total of three days to complete from start to finish. The EP became an underground favorite and garnered Skyzoo media write ups in outlets such as XXL, The Source, Vibe, AllHipHop.com, HipHopDX.com, and HipHopGame.com.

== Track listing ==
No.	Title	Length
1.	"Bare Witness"	2:58
2.	"Way To Go"	2:59
3.	"A Day In The Life"	3:47
4.	"Stop Fooling Yourself"	4:02
5.	"Come Back"	3:31
6.	"I'm On It"	3:27
7.	"Bodega"	4:11
8.	"You & Me"	4:15
9.	"Live & Direct"	3:07
10.	"The Spirit"	2:56
11.	"Extreme Measures"	3:42
12.	"Mirror Mirror"	4:10

== Samples ==
- "Bare Witness"—"You're So Good You're Bad" by Major Harris
- "Way To Go"—"The Makings of You" by Gladys Knight & the Pips
- "A Day In The Life"—"Is It Really True Girl" by Danny Pearson
- "Stop Fooling Yourself"—"Give Into Love" by Sister Sledge
- "Bodega"—"I Can Sing a Rainbow/Love is Blue" by The Dells
- "You & Me"—"You and Me" by Enchantment
- "Live & Direct"—"My Lady" by Wood, Brass & Steel
- "The Spirit"—"This Is Where I Come In" by Thelma Houston
- "Mirror Mirror"—"Risin' to the Top" by Keni Burke

== Personnel ==
- Skyzoo - primary artist
- 9th Wonder - primary artist
