= A Dream Deferred (album) =

Studio album by Skyzoo
- Released: October 2, 2012
- Recorded: 2010–2012; Big China Studios; Brooklyn, New York
- Genre: Hip hop
- Length: 65:49
- Labels: The Faculty; Duck Down
- Producers: !llmind; 9th Wonder; Jahlil Beats; Eric G.; Focus...; DJ Khalil; Best Kept Secret; Black Milk; Tall Black Guy

Skyzoo chronology
Live from the Tape Deck (2010)	A Dream Deferred (2012)	Barrel Brothers (2014)

Singles from A Dream Deferred
- 1. "Jansport Strings" Released: August 5, 2012; 2. "Give It Up" Released: October 3, 2012; 3. "Spike Lee Was My Hero" Released: January 23, 2013

A Dream Deferred is the second studio album of Brooklyn rapper Skyzoo. The album was released on October 23, 2012. The album met with a largely positive critical response, earning 86/100 from Metacritic. It is one of Skyzoo's best charting albums, reaching No. 7 on the Top Heatseekers chart, No. 191 on the Billboard 200, No. 25 on Top R&B/Hip-Hop Albums, No. 18 on Top Rap Albums, and No. 40 on the Independent Albums chart.

== Production and release ==
The album was originally scheduled for release on September 18, 2012, but it got pushed back to October 2, 2012.

The album's lead single "Jansport Strings" was produced by 9th Wonder and was released on August 7, 2012. Two more singles "Give It Up" and "Range Rover Rhythm" were released later.

== Reception ==
=== Critical response ===
Professional ratings
Aggregate scores
Source	Rating
Metacritic	86/100
Review scores
Source	Rating
Exclaim!	6/10 stars
HipHopDX	4/5 stars
Okayplayer	9/10 stars
PopMatters	8/10 stars
XXL	XL

A Dream Deferred largely received positive reviews upon its release from contemporary music critics. At Metacritic, which assigns a normalized rating out of 100 to reviews from mainstream critics, the album received an average score of 86, which indicates "universal acclaim", based on 5 reviews. Earning 4/5 stars from HipHopDX, PopMatters gave it 8/10, Okayplayer gave it 9/10, and it earned a positive review from the hip hop publication XXL. It earned a lower score from the Canadian website Exclaim!, which gave it 6/10.

== Track listing ==
No.	Title	Producer(s)	Length
1.	"Dreams In a Basement" (featuring Jill Scott)	!llmind	5:56
2.	"Jansport Strings (One Time for Chi-Ali)"	9th Wonder	3:19
3.	"Pockets Full" (featuring Freeway)	!llmind	4:15
4.	"Give It Up" (featuring DJ Prince)	!llmind	3:40
5.	"Glass Ceilings"	!llmind	3:49
6.	"Range Rover Rhythm"	Jahlil Beats	3:29
7.	"The Knowing" (featuring Jessy Wilson)	Eric G.	6:00
8.	"Drew & Derwin" (featuring Raheem DeVaughn)	Focus...	4:18
9.	"Realization" (featuring Jared Evan)	DJ Khalil	3:52
10.	"The Rage of Roemello"	DJ Khalil	5:38
11.	"How to Make It Through Hysteria"	Best Kept Secret	6:04
12.	"Steel's Apartment"	Black Milk	4:12
13.	"Spike Lee Was My Hero" (featuring Talib Kweli)	Tall Black Guy	5:37
14.	"The Cost of Sleep"	Tall Black Guy	5:38

Deluxe version bonus track
No.	Title	Producer(s)	Length
15.	"Live for the Moment" (featuring Colin Munroe)	Colin Munroe	4:41

== Charts ==
Chart (2014)	Peak position
US Billboard 200 (Billboard)	191
US Top Heatseekers (Billboard)	7
US Top R&B/Hip-Hop Albums (Billboard)	25
US Independent Albums (Billboard)	40
US Top Rap Albums (Billboard)	18

== Samples ==
- "Jansport Strings (One Time for Chi-Ali)" contains a sample from "What Good Is A Castle" by Joe Bataan
- "Pockets Full" contains a sample from "Synthetic Substitution" by Melvin Bliss
- "Steel's Apartment" contains a sample from "Jupiter" by Hypnotic Brass Ensemble
- "Spike Lee Was My Hero" contains a sample from "Windjammer" by Freddie Hubbard

== Personnel ==
Credits adapted from liner notes.

- Illmind: Keyboards, Synthesizers, recording engineer, mixing
- Godfather: Keyboards, Synths
- Illmind & The Big China Symphony: Violin, Viola, Cello, Flutes, Timpani, Fender Rhodes, Small Percussion
- Marion "OJ" Ross: Trumpet
- Marshall Brooks: Tuba
- Nina B., Ayah, Peter Hadar, Sheila D. Yeah, John Legend, Jessy Wilson, Kay Cee: background vocals
- Chris Boehner: Mastering
- Robert Adam Mayer: Photography
- Art direction & design: Jean Goode
