= The Last Stand (Boot Camp Clik album) =

Studio album by Boot Camp Clik
- Released: July 18, 2006
- Recorded: 2005–06
- Genre: East Coast hip-hop; hardcore hip-hop; underground hip-hop
- Length: 1:00:03
- Label: Duck Down
- Producer: Buckshot (exec.); Drew "Dru-Ha" Friedman (exec.); 9th Wonder; Coptic; Da Beatminerz; Illmind; Ken Ring; Large Professor; Marco Polo; Mr. Attic; Pete Rock; Rune Rotter; Sic Beats

Boot Camp Clik chronology
The Chosen Few (2002)	The Last Stand (2006)	Casualties of War (2007)

Singles from The Last Stand
- 1. "Yeah/Trading Places/Let's Go" Released: 2006

Professional ratings
Review scores
Source	Rating
HipHopDX	4/5
RapReviews	8/10
The Source	4/5
Vibe	3.5/5 stars
XXL	3/5 stars

The Last Stand is the third studio album by the American hip-hop collective Boot Camp Clik. It was released in 2006 through Duck Down Music. The production was handled by 9th Wonder, Marco Polo, Da Beatminerz, Coptic, Illmind, Ken Ring, Large Professor, Pete Rock, Rune Rotter and Sic Beats. The album marked the return of the original 1997 group lineup.

== Critical reception ==
XXL called the album "lush with pounding production and dense similes."

AllMusic wrote: "Awash in slow and mid-tempo tracks emblazoned with the dusty, cut-up R&B samples of NYC's '90s heyday, Boot Camp rolls thick through piano drops and sparely framed tracks, rapping about money, women, and street pride."

== Track listing ==
No.	Title	Writer(s)	Producer(s)	Length
1.	"Here We Come"	Darrell Yates Jr.; Kenyatta Blake; Sean Price; Patrick Douthit	9th Wonder	4:32
2.	"Let's Go"	Yates Jr.; Jack McNair; Blake; Price	Illmind	4:02
3.	"Yeah"	Barret Powell; Yates Jr.; Jahmal Bush; Blake; Tekomin Williams; Marco Bruno	Marco Polo	4:40
4.	"Hate All You Want"	Yates Jr.; Bush; Blake; Price; Williams; Bruno	Marco Polo	3:15
5.	"Don't You Cross the Line"	Powell; Yates Jr.; Bush; Blake; Price; Williams; S. Auguste	Sic Beats	4:55
6.	"1-2-3"	McNair; Blake; Price; Williams; Peter Phillips	Pete Rock	4:05
7.	"Take a Look (In the Mirror)"	Powell; Yates Jr.; Blake; Price; Williams; Douthit	9th Wonder	4:00
8.	"He Gave His Life" (featuring Jahdan Blakkamoore)	Powell; Yates Jr.; Blake; Williams; Wayne Henry; Bruno	Marco Polo	5:12
9.	"Trading Places"	Price; Williams; Bush; Yates Jr.; Ken Ring	Ken Ring; Rune Rotter	3:30
10.	"...But tha Game Iz Still tha Same"	Yates Jr.; Bush; Blake; Price; Walter Dewgarde	Da Beatminerz	3:45
11.	"So Focused"	Yates Jr.; Douthit	9th Wonder	4:17
12.	"Everybody Knows Now"	Powell; Bush; Blake; Williams; Eric Matlock	Coptic	4:26
13.	"World Wide"	Powell; Yates Jr.; Bush; Blake; Price; William Paul Mitchell	Large Professor	4:29
14.	"Soul Jah"	Powell; Yates Jr.; Dashawn Yates; Bush; McNair; Blake; Price; Williams; Roger Perryman	Mr. Attic	4:55
Total length:				1:00:03

== Charts ==
Chart (2006)	Peak position
US Top R&B/Hip-Hop Albums (Billboard)	48
US Independent Albums (Billboard)	20
