= Skyzoo =

American rapper (born 1982)

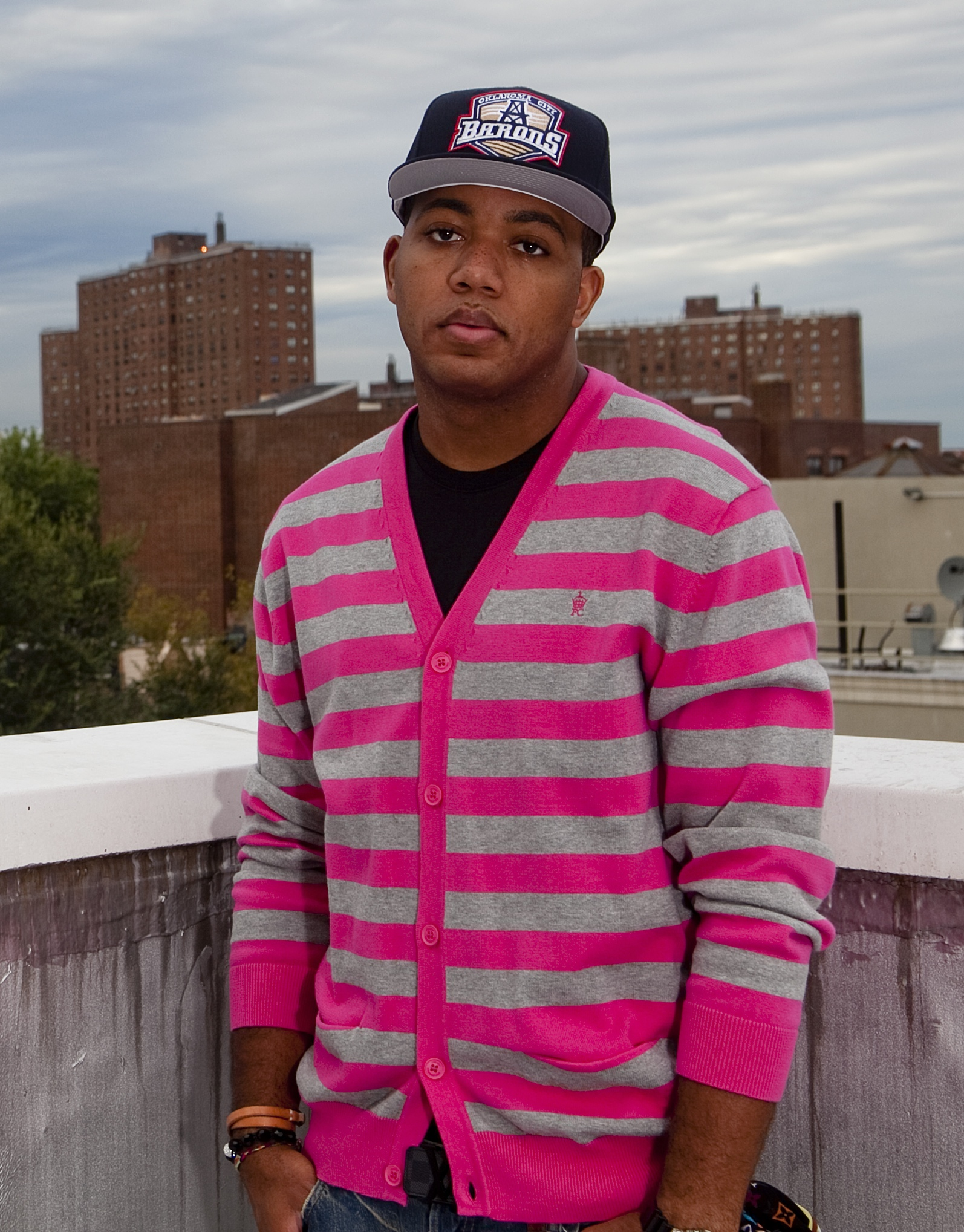
- Skyzoo in 2011

Background information
- Born: Gregory Skyler Taylor; December 24, 1982 (age 43); Brooklyn, New York, U.S.
- Genre: Hip-hop
- Occupations: Rapper; Director; songwriter
- Years active: 2002–present
- Labels: Jamla; Duck Down; The Faculty; First Generation Rich; Empire
- Website: skyzoothewriter.com

Gregory Skyler Taylor (born December 24, 1982), known professionally as Skyzoo, is an American rapper, director, and songwriter. He has released a number of notable solo and collaborative albums, including Cloud 9: The 3 Day High with 9th Wonder in 2006, The Salvation in 2009, A Dream Deferred in 2012, Music for My Friends in 2015, The Easy Truth with Apollo Brown in 2016, Retropolitan with Pete Rock in 2019, and his most recent solo album Keep Me Company. Skyzoo has also released a plethora of mixtapes including Corner Store Classic and The Great Debater throughout his career, and has worked with artists such as Jill Scott, Wale, Lloyd Banks, Dr. Dre, Black Thought, Jadakiss, Talib Kweli, Spike Lee, John Legend, among others. Skyzoo has headlined or co-headlined often-yearly tours throughout America, Europe, Africa, Australia, and Asia, and he owns and operates the independent record label First Generation Rich.

== Early life and education ==
Skyzoo was born Gregory Skyler Taylor on December 24, 1982, in the Crown Heights section of Brooklyn, New York City. He was nicknamed Skyzoo by his parents after the Skyy disco song of the same name (his middle name is Skyler). Skyzoo moved to the Bedford-Stuyvesant section of Brooklyn in his youth. Skyzoo grew up listening to hip-hop artists such as Big Daddy Kane, N.W.A, Kid 'n Play, EPMD, Eric B. & Rakim and A Tribe Called Quest, but it was the music video for Chi-Ali's '"Age Ain't Nuthin' But a Number" that inspired him to begin writing raps and focusing on the music business. He was nine years old at the time. He was raised one block away from rapper Notorious B.I.G., and has often cited B.I.G.'s success as an influence on his writing. He also cites Jay-Z as an important inspiration, and names his favorites emcees as Jay-Z and Mos Def. During Skyzoo's teenage years, his father moved to South Jamaica, Queens, and Skyzoo began spending much of his time there as well as in Brooklyn. He frequently references both boroughs in his music and has two younger brothers. Instead of going to school in his own neighborhood as he got older, Skyzoo's parents enrolled him in a high school in Manhattan to take advanced classes. Skyzoo also attended college, but didn't finish, at SUNY Farmingdale in Long Island. In 2006, he was employed at Morgan Stanley at the age of 23. However, he was terminated for coming back from lunch late, which led him to pursue a music career full-time.

== Career ==
=== Early years and material ===
In 2002 Skyzoo began releasing his own mixtapes throughout New York, and he soon encountered the North Carolina rap crew the Justus League, collaborating on several projects. Skyzoo has won two Underground Music Awards, in the categories of "Best Male Rapper" in 2002 and "Best Lyricist" in 2008. An encounter with Justus League rapper Chaundon led to Skyzoo meeting producer 9th Wonder in 2005, and the two started a long-term collaboration. The pair would go on to record the collaborative EP Cloud 9: The 3 Day High, which reportedly took a total of three days to complete from start to finish. Released on September 12, 2006, the album was entirely produced by 9th Wonder, and included the singles "Way To Go" and "The Bodega." The release led to Skyzoo's first national feature, when he was placed in the "Show & Prove" section of XXL Magazine in October 2006. The project also lead to the 2007 vinyl release of the DJ Premier produced singles "Get It Done" b/w "Click", both featuring fellow Brooklyn rapper and frequent collaborator Torae. The EP led to media write ups in outlets such as XXL, The Source, Vibe, AllHipHop.com, HipHopDX.com, HipHopGame.com and others.

Skyzoo's mixtape Corner Store Classic was released for free on July 20, 2007. It had production from 9th Wonder, DJ Premier, and others. Skyzoo contributed most vocals, though guest vocalists such as Sean Price, Guilty Simpson, and Torae. The album was generally well-received, and XXL gave it a positive rating of XL. In 2007, he stated that he had a sophomore studio album ready, called The Salvation, but was waiting for a major record deal before releasing it. In the spring of 2009, Skyzoo jointly signed to independent label Duck Down Records and to 9th Wonder's Jamla Records imprint. Skyzoo then went on to release the mixtape The Power of Words. Hosted by DJ Drama and Statik Selektah, the project included guest vocals from frequent collaborator Wale, Maino, Talib Kweli, Reks, Young Chris, and others.

=== The Salvation (2009) ===
Through Duck Down Records, his debut LP The Salvation was released on September 29, 2009 with the singles "The Beautiful Decay", "Popularity", "Easy To Fly", and "My Interpretation." Upon release, Skyzoo described it as autobiographical and his most personal work. Skyzoo had been planning this album since he was 9 years old, and The Salvation provides an intricate view into his life and experiences. Instead of bringing in a large number of guest artists, Skyzoo handles most of the vocals himself, explaining the "album isn't exactly the way I planned it out at 9-years-old, but it tells my story. With that being said, no one can help tell my story better than me." About the selection of guest rappers, according to Skyzoo, "it wasn't really a 'who's hot, who's not' type of thing. It was more so 'just get what sounds right.' I got a lot of big-name producers, and I also got a lot of up-and-comers." Among the contributing producers are Best Kept Secret, 9th Wonder, Nottz, Just Blaze, Illmind, Needlz and Black Milk. It charted on various Billboard charts, reaching No. 126 on the Billboard 200, No. 4 on the Top Heatseekers chart, and No. 14 on the Tastemaker Albums chart. The album was generally well received. AllMusic gave it a positive review and a rating of 4/5, while XXL gave it 4/5 as well.

External videos
- Skyzoo – "The Necessary Evils" Music Video (May 13, 2009)

To promote the album, Skyzoo and director Mills Miller filmed a webisode series titled Saving Our Grace. The short documentaries were shot throughout New York City and showed six different characters, such as a single mother and a young drug dealer, each representing a different emotion displayed on the album. The series debuted on Skyzoo's official YouTube page in August 2009. Overall five official music videos were released from The Salvation, starting with "The Necessary Evils" which was released in May 2008. The video was directed by Tee Smif of the production company KCCC and shows a teenage drug dealer attempting to change his lifestyle, and the highs and subsequent lows he faces. On July 30, 2009, the video for "The Beautiful Decay", produced by 9th Wonder and directed by Artemus Jenkins, was released. Following the release of the album, a video for the song "Popularity" was made and released on November 18, 2009. The video, directed by Todd Angkasuwan, is a parody on the popular high-school drama Saved by the Bell. Restless Films director Court Dunn directed the video for the third single "Easy To Fly. Released on March 15, 2010, the video is an ode to the film "Love Jones". Skyzoo plays as Darius Lovehall with model Ashlee Ray as Nina Mosley. On April 21, 2010, Skyzoo released a video for the song "My Interpretation", the final single of the album. The video is directed by Artemus Jenkins.

=== Mixtapes and collaborations (2010–2011) ===
Released on October 5, 2010, Skyzoo's collaborative EP with Illmind titled Live from the Tape Deck was a free-form showcase of his lyricism. Unlike Skyzoo's debut album The Salvation, there largely aren't deeply personal themes in Live from the Tape Deck. The album is a collection of "raw" hip-hop with a cohesive backdrop. With this project, the two artists planned to bring what hip-hop veterans such as Eric B. & Rakim, Gang Starr, EPMD, N.W.A, and A Tribe Called Quest brought by having one producer with one sound and one theme. With the album, Skyzoo stated that his goal was "to make something that felt like a 2010 cassette tape. I wanted the content to be raw and lyric-driven as always, but not as story-driven or emotional as The Salvation was. There are still parts of the album that are stories and concepts, but not as much as my debut had. This one was more of a beats and rhymes type of album." It was rated 'XL' (4/5) by XXL Magazine, and received an 'XXL' (5/5) rating in the 'lyrics' category of the review.

In 2011, Skyzoo amicably parted ways with 9th Wonder's Jamla Imprint, with the two remaining periodic collaborators. On June 7, 2011, Skyzoo released the free mixtape The Great Debater. The project was sponsored by the Jordan Brand, and featured the singles "The Definitive Prayer", "Test Drive", "Atypical", and "Written In The Drums". Skyzoo has said that the project was created as a "thank you" gift to his fans for continuously purchasing and supporting his releases. The project, 16 songs in total, contains almost all original production (excluding the N.E.R.D sampled "Inside Of Clouds" instrumental on "Could've Struck The Lotto") from producers such as Illmind, 9th Wonder, Swiff D, Best Kept Secret, Oh No, and others. The cover art drew attention for its usage of characters from The Cosby Show. Skyzoo has stated that The Great Debater is loosely based around the theme of achieving success in one's field, and that as a child he saw the Huxtable family as a picture of success. This led to him wanting to portray success on the mixtape's cover as he'd envisioned it in his youth. It was featured most major hip-hop blogs, and The Great Debater was rated 'XL' (4/5) by XXL Magazine, where they stated Skyzoo "leaves nothing up for debate when it comes to his pen skills."

=== A Dream Deferred (2012) ===
Skyzoo's sophomore full-length solo album, A Dream Deferred, was released on October 2, 2012. The album is the follow-up to his debut The Salvation, and similar to his debut, it focuses on an autobiographical writing form, with a larger musical scale. The album features Jill Scott, Freeway, Raheem Devaughn, and Talib Kweli, and includes production by Illmind, 9th Wonder, Black Milk, and others. The first single, "JanSport Strings", was released on August 29, 2012. Additional singles include the Jahlil Beats produced "Range Rover Rhythm", and then Skyzoo' single "Spike Lee Was My Hero" featuring Talib Kweli. The video for the latter, directed by Alex Ghassan, includes cameos from Spike Lee himself, who upon hearing the song reached out to Skyzoo via Twitter to be involved in the video process. The video debuted on BET's 106 & Park as the "New Joint Of The Day" in January 2013. A Dream Deferred met with a largely positive critical response, and became one of Skyzoo's best charting albums, reaching No. 7 on the Top Heatseekers chart and No. 18 on Top Rap Albums chart. The album received an 'XL' rating via XXL, and at Metacritic, which assigns a normalized rating out of 100 to reviews from mainstream critics, the album received an average score of 86, which indicates "universal acclaim", based on 5 reviews.

=== Collaborative releases (2012–2013) ===
He collaborated on the EP An Ode to Reasonable Doubt with Antman Wonder in 2013. The nine-track album, dedicated to Jay Z's album Reasonable Doubt, was released on Jay Z's birthday on December 4, 2013. A music video was also released for the album's track "Meeting the Presidents." According to Skyzoo, the idea for the EP came to him via a tweet from a fan asking him to consider remaking Jay-Z's debut, in a manner similar to how Elzhi recreated the Nas album Illmatic. With guest artists such as Torae, Sha Stimuli, and Kay Cola, the album was entirely produced and composed by Antman Wonder without the use of samples. Instead of sampling, Antman Wonder recreated the production with a live orchestra. It was generally well received by music critics, with publications such as HipHopDX giving it a positive review.

In 2013 Skyzoo completed his contractual obligations with Duck Down Records and in 2014 created his own label imprint: First Generation Rich, Inc (commonly referred to as "FGR"). At the request of fans over the years, Skyzoo and frequent collaborator Torae began working on the joint album Barrel Brothers. Singles included the Illmind-produced "Blue Yankee Fitted", AntMan Wonder produced "Memorabilia", and DJ Premier produced "The Aura", which was co-produced by AntMan Wonder. The project, released on May 27, 2014, features Guilty Simpson, Sean Price, Blu, Black Milk, and Apollo Brown, among others.

=== Music For My Friends (2015) ===
Music For My Friends is the third solo album by Skyzoo. Featuring guest artists such as Jadakiss, Black Thought, Bilal, Elzhi, Westside Gunn, Christon Gray and others, the LP is based on the idea of growing up at 13 years old and seeing the world based on the morals learned at that age. The album includes production by Illmind, Thelonious Martin, Jahlil Beats, MarcNfinit, Apollo Brown, DJ Prince, and others, and also features cover art commissioned by comic book illustrator Chris B. Murray.

"As with every offering from Skyzoo, his lyricism and imagery helps to bring the listener into his stories, this time [with Music For My Friends] speaking from the perspective of a 13-year-old kid trying to find his place in the world… From the sequencing of the album to the production, Skyzoo's new LP highlights his ability to create conceptual albums that offer a breath of fresh air in today's musical climate."
— XXL (July 2015)

As the first project released as part of a newly formed label distribution deal between Empire Distribution and Skyzoo's own First Generation Rich imprint, the album serves as the official followup to his 2012 release A Dream Deferred. Music For My Friends was prematurely leaked on file sharing sites on the morning of June 17, 2015, prompting Skyzoo to release the digital versions of the album early. Physical copies stuck to the original street date of June 23, 2015. Among the singles are "Luxury", which features Westside Gunn, and had an official music video released. Other singles from the LP included "Suicide Doors", "Women Who Can Cook", and "Civilized Leisure" featuring MoZaic.

The album was generally well received. It peaked at No. 15 on the US Top Heatseekers chart, and at No. 36 at Top R&B/Hip-Hop Albums, and was written about positively in the music press. HipHopDX gave the album 4/5 stars, writing that the album is "a collection of stories and anecdotes from Skyzoo's youth, with shout outs to — and from — friends and family." XXL wrote that "as with every offering from Skyzoo, his lyricism and imagery helps to bring the listener into his stories," and in July 2015, the staff at XXL included the album on their list of the "30 Best Hip-Hop Albums of 2015 (So Far)." On June 27, 2015, Skyzoo threw an album release concert in conjunction with popular hip-hop website Okayplayer at the Blue Note jazz club in NYC. The concert showcased Skyzoo performing with a live six-piece jazz band.

Skyzoo's social media use was referenced in the July 2015 edition Bloomberg Businessweek. Skyzoo has also licensed his music in various corporate outlets including NBA 2K11, NBA 2K12. Buffalo Wild Wings, NBA Shoot Around, Rockstar Games' Grand Theft Auto IV: The Lost and Damned, HBO's Entourage, and 2K Sports. Skyzoo has had tracks used as both the theme to ESPN's Whiplash TV and the soundtrack to a Guinness advert.

=== The Easy Truth (2016) ===
In 2016, Skyzoo collaborated with Mello Music Group producer Apollo Brown. The project, a full-length studio album titled The Easy Truth, was released September 30, 2016. The fifteen-track album contained multiple features from the likes of Patty Crash, Joell Ortiz, Conway, Westside Gunn, and Stalley. It was released to critical acclaim, reviewed by the likes of AllMusic, HipHopDX, and many others.

=== Peddler Themes EP and In Celebration of Us (2017) ===
On March 27, 2017, Skyzoo announced, via Instagram, that he would be releasing two projects in 2017, an EP in July and a full-length studio album in December.

The first project of the year, an eight-track EP entitled Peddler Themes, was released on July 21, 2017. It features production work from the likes of Illmind, Apollo Brown, among others. Skyzoo even provides his own producing abilities on one of the tracks. The EP became available for pre-order on July 12, 2017, and its lead single "Finesse Everything" was released via iTunes, SoundCloud, among others. In November, it was revealed that his album was completed and he later revealed the release date for February 2, 2018.

== Musical style and influences ==
Skyzoo has cited as influences hip-hop artists such as Notorious B.I.G., Jay-Z, Nas, N.W.A, Big Daddy Kane, and Kid 'n Play, as well as non-hip-hop artists such as Sade and Nirvana. He has credited J Dilla as one of his biggest inspirations and favorite producer. A self-professed fan of the HBO crime drama The Wire, he frequently references the characters and plotlines in his music, and has cited show creator David Simon as one of his biggest idols as a writer. Also a fan of jazz, Skyzoo has stated that Miles Davis, John Coltrane, Horace Silver, and Wayne Shorter as his favorite artists in the genre. He has further stated that Coltrane's A Love Supreme is his favorite album in any genre.

== Personal life ==
An avid basketball fan, Skyzoo at times guest blogs for the online version of Slam magazine with a column named "Chain Link Champions." He is a vocal supporter of the New York Knicks basketball team.

On September 18, 2015, Skyzoo married long time girlfriend Courtney Taylor (née Hinckson).

He was previously linked to Sharlee Jeter, the sister of former New York Yankees baseball player Derek Jeter, which attracted some attention in the media. The couple called off an engagement and stopped seeing each other in 2010. Two years later there was speculation in the press that Skyzoo was the father of her newborn son, which was refuted. He is the cousin of Charlamagne Tha God.

== Awards and nominations ==
Year	Award	Nominated work	Category	Result
2002	Underground Music Awards	Skyzoo	Best Male Rapper	Won
2008	Underground Music Awards	Skyzoo	Best Lyricist	Won

== Discography ==
=== Albums ===
Solo and collaborative albums by Skyzoo
Year	Album title	USA Billboard chart peaks						Release details
Year	Album title	200	Heat	R&B	Indie	Rap	Taste	Release details
2006	Cloud 9: The 3 Day High (with 9th Wonder)	—	—	—	—	—	—	Released: October 24, 2006; Label: Traffic Entertainment; Format: Digital download, CD
2009	The Salvation	126	4	—	16	—	14	Released: September 29, 2009; Label: Jamla Records/Duck Down; Format: Digital download, CD
2010	Live from the Tape Deck (with Illmind)	—	3	33	30	16	—	Released: October 5, 2010; Label: Duck Down; Format: Digital download, CD
2012	A Dream Deferred	191	7	25	40	18	—	Released: September 18, 2012; Label: The Faculty/Duck Down; Format: Digital download, CD
2014	Barrel Brothers (with Torae)	196	8	29	40	16	—	Released: May 27, 2014; Label: First Generation Rich/Internal Affairs/Loyalty Digital Corp.; Format: Digital download, CD
2015	Music for My Friends	—	15	36	—	—	—	Released: June 23, 2015; Label: First Generation Rich, Empire; Format: Digital download, CD
2016	The Easy Truth (with Apollo Brown)	—	11	25	45	—	—	Released: September 30, 2016; Label: Mello Music Group; Format: Digital download, CD, LP
2018	In Celebration of Us	—	5	—	26	—	—	Released: February 2, 2018; Label: First Generation Rich; Format: Digital download, CD
2019	Retropolitan (with Pete Rock)	—	—	—	26	—	—	Released: September 20, 2019; Label: Mello Music Group; Format: Digital download, CD
2021	All the Brilliant Things	—	—	—	—	—	—	Released: June 11, 2021; Label: Mello Music Group; Format: Digital download, CD
2023	The Mind of a Saint (with The Other Guys)	—	—	—	—	—	—	Released: January 13, 2023; Label: First Generation Rich, HiPNOTT; Format: Digital download, CD
2024	Keep Me Company	—	—	—	—	—	—	Released: November 29, 2024; Label: Old Soul Music, First Generation Rich; Format: Digital download, CD
2026	Luxury Tax (with Apollo Brown)	—	—	—	—	—	—	Scheduled: September 25, 2026; Label: Escapism, FGR; Format: Digital download, CD, LP

=== EPs ===
Solo and collaborative extended plays by Skyzoo
Year	Album title	Release details
2013	An Ode to Reasonable Doubt (with Antman Wonder)	Released: December 4, 2013; Label: First Generation Rich/Loyalty Digital Corp.; Format: Digital download
2014	Tomorrow Morning	Released: February 14, 2014; Label: Self-released; Format: Digital download
2017	Peddler Themes	Released: July 21, 2017; Label: First Generation Rich; Format: Digital download
2020	The Bluest Note (with Dumbo Station)	Released: April 24, 2020; Label: Tuff Kong Records/First Generation Rich; Format: Digital download
2020	Milestones	Released: June 19, 2020; Label: Mello Music Group; Format: Digital download
2025	Views of a Lifetime	Released: December 5, 2025; Label: First Generation Rich/Hipnott; Format: Digital download

=== Mixtapes ===
List of mixtapes, with year released
Title	Mixtape details
I'm for the People	Released: 2004; Label: Self-released; Format: Digital download
Back for the First Time	Released: 2004; Label: Self-released; Format: Digital download
Ghetto Celebrity: The Mixtape	Released: 2004; Label: Self-released; Format: Digital download
The Greatest Flow on Earth	Released: 2005; Label: Self-released; Format: Digital download
The City's Favorite: The Mixtape	Released: 2005; Label: Self-released; Format: Digital download
The Way You Get Down	Released: 2006; Label: Self-released; Format: Digital download
Corner Stone Classic	Released: July 19, 2007; Label: Self-released; Format: Digital download
Corner Stone Classic (The Remixes)	Released: 2008; Label: Self-released; Format: Digital download
The Power of Words	Released: April 17, 2009; Label: Self-released; Format: Digital download
The Great Debater	Released: June 7, 2011; Label: Self-released; Format: Digital download
The Great Debater Revisited	Released: 2012; Label: Self-released; Format: Digital download
The Penny Freestyle Series	Released: 2012; Label: Self-released; Format: Digital download
Theo VS. J.J. (Dreams vs. Reality)	Released: August 30, 2012; Label: FGR/First Generation Rich; Format: Digital download

=== Singles ===
Incomplete list of songs by Skyzoo
Year	Title	Label
2006	"The Way You Get Down"	Custom Made/DBRG
2006	"Way to Go 12"" (with 9th Wonder)	Traffic Entertainment Group
2008	"Perfect Timing" (with CL Smooth)	Coalmine Records
2008	"Lyrically Inclined" (feat. Wale)	Audioworx
2009	"Strung Out"	Coalmine Records
2010	"Click" (with Torae and DJ Premier)	Soulspazm/Internal Affairs
2011	"Get It Done" (with Torae and DJ Premier)	Soulspazm/Internal Affairs
2012	"Jansport Strings (One Time For Chi-Ali)"	The Faculty/Duck Down
2012	"Jansport Strings (Remix)"	The Faculty/Duck Down
2013	"Spike Lee Was My Hero" (ft. Talib Kweli)	The Faculty/Duck Down
2014	"Blue Yankee Fitted" (with Torae)	First Generation Rich/EMPIRE/etc.
2015	"Luxury" (with Westside Gunn)	Music for My Friends/First Generation Rich/EMPIRE/etc.

=== Guest appearances ===
Selected songs featuring Skyzoo
Year	Title	Primary artist(s)	Album	Label
2007	"Merchants Of Dreams" (feat. L.E.G.A.C.Y., Chaundon, Torae, Skyzoo)	9th Wonder	The Dream Merchant Vol. 2	Caroline
2007	"Let It Bang" (feat. Ness, Skyzoo)	9th Wonder	The Dream Merchant Vol. 2	Caroline
2007	"Talk to Me" (feat. Jon Hope, Reks, Skyzoo)	Statik Selektah	Spell My Name Right: The Album	Showoff Records, Brick Records
2008	"Let Your Hair Down" (feat. Skyzoo, Lil Eddie)	Kidz in the Hall	The In Crowd	Duck Down Records
2008	"Money on the Ave" (feat. Skyzoo)	Reks	Grey Hairs	ShowOff Records
2008	"Do You" (feat. El Da Sensei, Returners, Skyzoo)	King Magnetic	The Co-$ign	King Mag Music
2008	"Let's Move" (feat. Skyzoo)	JR & PH7	The Standard	Revolution Recordings, Supercity, Grindin
2008	"Talkin Bout You (Ladies)" (feat. Skyzoo, Joell Ortiz, Talib Kweli)	Statik Selektah	Stick 2 the Script	Showoff Records, Brick Records
2008	"Left 4 Dead" (feat. Skyzoo)	EPMD	We Mean Business	EP Records, Fontana
2009	"Money on the Ave" (Remix) (feat. Termanology, Skyzoo)	Reks	More Grey Hairs	ShowOff Records
2009	"Appreciation" (feat. Skyzoo)	Analogic	Appreciation EP	Soulspazm
2009	"Inside Out" (feat. Skyzoo, Copywrite, Pacewon)	Tone Spliff	Authentic	Mind Write Music
2009	"Trouble" (feat. Skyzoo)	Ginuwine	A Man's Thoughts	Notifi, Asylum, Warner Bros.
2010	"Get Out" (feat. Skyzoo, Big Pooh, Torae, Lee Wilson)	Statik Selektah	100 Proof: The Hangover	Showoff Records, Brick Records
2010	"One Day in Heaven" (feat. Skyzoo, Jaiden)	John Regan	Sorry I'm Late	Culture VI Records
2010	"Hoop Dreams to Rap Dreams" (feat. King Mez, Skyzoo)	Rapsody	Return of the B-Girl	Jamla Records
2010	"Honda Accord Music" (Remix) (feat. Thee Tom Hardy, Skyzoo)	Rapsody	Return of the B-Girl	Jamla Records
2010	"Perfect Timing" (feat. Skyzoo)	CL Smooth	Perfect Timing EP	Empire, Sony/ATV, UMPG Publishing
2011	"Hearing the Melody" (feat. Fashawn, King Mez, Skyzoo)	9th Wonder	The Wonder Years	It's a Wonderful World Music Group
2011	"Half Moon Part" (feat. Skyzoo, Chuuwee, Tayyib Ali)	Statik Selektah	Population Control	Showoff Records, Duck Down Records
2012	"Until It's All Said And Done" (feat. Sean Price, Skyzoo)	JR & PH7	The Good Life	JAKARTA
2012	"It Was All A Dream" (feat. Skyzoo)	Kydd Jones	Sounds In My Head 2	LNS Crew
2013	"Can I" (feat. Rapper Big Pooh, Tony V, Skyzoo)	Ron Rico	—N/a	D.O.E.
2013	"Champion" (feat. Skyzoo)	Local-Mu12	Labor Day	Loyalty Digital Corp.
2013	"Goin' Nowhere" (feat. Skyzoo, Lydia Caesar)	Syler	One Minute To Midnight	Syler Music
2013	"The Come Back Kid" (feat. Skyzoo, F.T.)	Shabaam Sahdeeq	Keepers of the Lost Art	Hardtimes
2013	"City of Angels" (feat. Skyzoo)	Rav.P	—N/a	Rav.P
2013	"Pour Cups (For the Summer)" (feat. Skyzoo)	Sandy Solo	—N/a	Die Geldmaschine
2013	"Welcome to America" (feat. Skyzoo, Havoc)	P-Money	Gratitude	Dawn Raid Ent.
2013	"Moment of Truth" (feat. Skyzoo, Warren Wint, Sha Stimuli, Señor Kaos)	Spectac and Shakim	For The People	HiPNOTT Records
2014	"City of Giants" (feat. Skyzoo, Torae, Cortez)	Fokis	THE WWE-P	Loyalty Digital
2014	"Rider Music" (feat. Skyzoo)	Julian Juellz	—N/a	Loyalty Digital
2014	"Where's the Love" (feat. Talib Kweli, Elzhi, Skyzoo)	Diamond D	The Diam Piece	Dymond Mine Records, Fat Beats, Empire Distribution
2014	"Get Away" (feat. Skyzoo, Torae, Reks)	Termanology	Shut Up and Rap	ST. Records, Showoff Records, Brick Records
2015	"Ain't Nothing Funny" (feat. Skyzoo, Craig G)	Sadat X	Never Left	RPM/Short-Fuze
2015	"The Trophy Room" (feat. Skyzoo, Ea$y Money, Domo Genesis, Masspike Miles)	Statik Selektah	Lucky 7	Showoff Records, Duck Down Records
2015	"Pulling Strings" (feat. Skyzoo)	Ice Grill	—N/a	RPM/Short-Fuze
2015	"Neva Eva" (feat. Skyzoo & Torae as Barrel Brothers)	Apollo Brown	Grandeur	Mello Music Group
2016	"50 In. Zenith" (feat. Skyzoo)	Westside Gunn	FLYGOD	Griselda Records
2017	"The Shadowed Gallery" (feat. Skyzoo)	Dex	Gallery OTEOT	District10
2017	"Peep the Steeze" (feat. Skyzoo)	Hex One	Words Worth A Thousand Pictures	Mic Theory Records
2018	"Ima F*ckin Rockstar" (feat. Skyzoo)	Onyx	Black Rock	Steakhouse Recording Studios, OPM Studios
2020	"Silver Alley" (feat. Skyzoo)	Nuch & Tony Digz	Silver Alley EP	Odd Ball Gang, 3 Day Old Pizza.
2021	"If You're The One" (feat. Skyzoo)	Raheem DeVaughn & Apollo Brown	Lovesick	Mello Music Group, First Generation Rich, Inc.
2022	"What It Seems" (feat. Skyzoo, Rome Streetz)	Ghettosocks & DK	Listen to the Masters	Black Buffalo Records
2024	"The Signal" (feat. the bum., sene, Elzhi & Skyzoo)	Dex & Small Professor	A Long Absence	District10 & Beat Goliath
2026	"The Tangled Web" (feat. Hymphatic Thabs, Skyzoo & Zilla Rocca)	Dex	Path_Between Eternities	District10

== See also ==
- List of hip-hop musicians
