= Entitled (album) =

Studio album by Torae
- Released: January 15, 2016
- Recorded: 2015
- Genre: Hip hop
- Label: Internal Affairs Entertainment
- Producer: Apollo Brown; DJ Premier; E. Jones; Eric G; Illmind; Jahlil Beats; Khrysis; MarcNfinit; Mr. Porter; Nottz; Pete Rock; Praise

Torae chronology
Barrel Brothers (2014)	Entitled (2016)

Singles from Entitled
- 1. "Saturday Night" Released: September 21, 2015

Entitled is the second studio album by American rapper Torae. It was released on January 15, 2016, by Internal Affairs Entertainment. The guest appearances on the album by Saul Williams, Phonte, 3D Na'Tee, Jarell Perry, Mack Wilds, Teedra Moses, Pharoahe Monch, Roni Marsalis, Shaquawana Shonte, and Kil Ripkin. Production by Pete Rock, Apollo Brown, Jahlil Beats, Illmind, Eric G., Khrysis, DJ Premier, Nottz, Praise, MarcNfinit, E. Jones and Mr. Porter.

Professional ratings
Review scores
Source	Rating
RapReviews	10/10

== Track listing ==
No.	Title	Producer	Length
1.	"Introview"		2:28
2.	"Imperial Sound" (featuring Saul Williams)	Praise	4:16
3.	"Get Down"	Pete Rock	3:04
4.	"Clap Shit Up" (featuring Phonte)	Nottz	3:09
5.	"Let 'Em Know"	Jahlil Beats	3:40
6.	"Override" (featuring Jarell Perry and Roni Marsalis)	E. Jones	6:34
7.	"Crown" (featuring 3D Na'Tee)	Mr. Porter	2:41
8.	"R.E.A.L."	Praise	3:25
9.	"Coney Island's Finest"	Apollo Brown	4:48
10.	"Troubled Times" (featuring Mack Wilds)	!llmind	3:52
11.	"Together" (featuring Kil Ripkin and Shaquawna Shanté)	Praise	3:32
12.	"Entitled" (featuring Teedra Moses)	Eric G.	4:32
13.	"The eNd"	MarcNfinit	2:48
14.	"Shoutro"	Khrysis	11:39

Deluxe edition (bonus tracks)
No.	Title	Producer	Length
15.	"Saturday Night"	DJ Premier	3:26
16.	"What's Love" (featuring Pharoahe Monch)	Praise	4:11

Samples Used

- "Imperial Sound" contains a sample from "What's This World Coming To" by Formula IV.
- "R.E.A.L." contains a sample from "To The Establishment" by Lou Bond.
- "Together" contains a sample from "Together (We Can Make Something Happen)" by The Individuals.
- "Shoutro" contains a sample from "Whole Lot a Love" by Heaven & Earth.
- "What's Love" contains a sample from "Ain't Nothing Like The Real Thing" by The Dynamic Superiors.

== Charts ==
Chart (2016)	Peak position
US Heatseekers Albums (Billboard)	23
