= Blazetrak =

- Website type: A&R
- Available in: English
- Owners: Corey Stanford, Nathaniel Casey, and Ronald Harrison
- Website: Homepage
- Commercial: Yes
- Launched: 2009
- Current status: Defunct

Blazetrak was a website that was launched in November 2009 by entrepreneurs Corey Stanford, Nathaniel Casey, and Ronald Harrison, to connect unknown artists, producers, and songwriters with music industry professionals that would provide feedback on songs uploaded for their review.

Stanford and Casey initially founded the web consultancy firm Clariwebs in 2007, and used the profits to develop the financial base for Blazetrak, a process that took about a year.

Users are able to choose which professional they want to submit their work to, and pay a fee that varies depending on the person they select. Submissions are critiqued by the professional; comments are recorded on video and forwarded to the user. Professionals reported to be participating have included Big Boi, Infinity, Shawn Stockman, Paul Worley, Kalle Engstrom, and Ruben Studdard.

Uses for the site have included official auditions for record, production, and publishing contracts by label owners like Andre Harrell, creator of Uptown Records and former President of Motown Records; talent managers like Pussycat Dolls creator Robin Antin; and producers like Rodney Jerkins. By the end of 2011 Blazetrak featured over 400 celebrities and experts, with more than 50,000 users from 202 countries.
