= The Salvation (album) =

Studio album by Skyzoo
- Released: September 29, 2009
- Recorded: 2008–2009
- Studios: Nycetrax Studios; CDR Studioz; New York City, New York; The Durt Factory; Norfolk, Virginia; De Stu at North Carolina Central University; Durham, North Carolina
- Genre: Hip hop
- Length: 1:07:15
- Labels: Jamla; Duck Down
- Producers: Skyzoo (exec.); 9th Wonder (also exec.); Best Kept Secret; Black Milk; Cyrus Tha Great; Eric G; Illmind; Just Blaze; Needlz; Nottz

Skyzoo chronology
Cloud 9: The 3 Day High (2006)	The Salvation (2009)	Live from the Tape Deck (2010)

Singles from The Salvation
- 1. "The Beautiful Decay" Released: July 13, 2009; 2. "Popularity" Released: September 8, 2009; 3. "Easy To Fly" Released: March 15, 2010; 4. "My Interpretation" Released: April 21, 2010

The Salvation is the debut solo studio album by American rapper Skyzoo. It was released on September 29, 2009, via Jamla Records and Duck Down Music. Production was handled by 9th Wonder, Cyrus Tha Great, Eric G., Nottz, Best Kept Secret, Black Milk, Illmind, Just Blaze and Needlz. It features guest appearance from Carlitta Durand.

The album peaked at number 126 on the US Billboard 200, number 4 on the Top Heatseekers, number 16 on the Independent Albums and number 14 on the Tastemakers.

== Production and themes ==
The Brooklyn-raised emcee stated that he had been planning this album since he was 9 years old. The Salvation provides an intricate view into Skyzoo's life and experiences. The diverse range of production and the autobiographical nature is in contrast to his previous releases, with Skyzoo describing it at the time as his most personal work. A tactic taken by Skyzoo to emphasize the personal aspect of The Salvation was to not load the album up with features from other rappers, explaining that "the moment you pick up a pen or start rhyming as a kid, all you think about is getting an album out. This album isn't exactly the way I planned it out at 9-years-old, but it tells my story. With that being said, no one can help tell my story better than me. The Salvation is about me".

About the selection of guest rappers, according to Skyzoo, "it wasn't really a 'who's hot, who's not' type of thing. It was more so 'just get what sounds right'. I got a lot of big name producers, and I also got a lot of up and comers".

== Release and reception ==
Professional ratings
Review scores
Source	Rating
AllMusic	4/5 stars
HipHopDX	4/5
PopMatters	7/10
RapReviews	8.5/10
The Austin Chronicle	3.5/5 stars
XXL	4/5

The album was originally set to be released on the fourth quarter of 2008, but was later pushed to August 11, 2009, then again to August 25, then finally set for the 29th of September via 9th Wonder's Jamla Records, which is a sub-label of Duck Down Records.

Patrick Taylor of RapReviews.com praised the album, saying that it "is consistently good, and frequently great. It has the raw honesty of a backpack rap album with the ruggedness of the streets. In the press materials accompanying this record, Skyzoo says he wanted to make an album worth the listener's fifteen bucks. He's definitely succeeded. Salvation is not only one of the strongest debuts in a while, it's one of the best albums of 2009". AllMusic's Jason Thurston said, that the project "is no revelation by any means, nor is it apparently trying to be, but it is a satisfying debut, a solid fulfillment of the promise built up by a young lion wordsmith". Andrew Thomas of HipHopDX wrote: "with its creative production, crafty lyrics, and most important, Skyzoo's penchant for delivering earnest rhymes wrapped in powerful humanity, The Salvation is enough to keep you on high, at least until his next release". Jaeki Cho of XXL resumed: "Skyzoo's first official effort is a good look for fans in need of a little salvation". Andrew Martin of PopMatters found out that "even with that varied list of producers, the album's sound is cohesive. They knew what this emcee was looking to do, and that quality paired with Skyzoo's ridiculous lyrical skills are what make The Salvation an engaging listen. Again, the aforementioned issue with his voice and flow will leave some listeners unsatisfied".

== Videos ==
Three official videos have been released from the album so far, starting with "The Necessary Evils" which was released already in May 2008, this song was featured on Corner Store Classic: The Remixes mixtape. The video was directed by Tee Smif of the production company KCCC and shows Skyzoo rapping the song at a stoupe to a Brooklyn apartment in black-and-white shots.

On July 7, 2009, a trailer of Skyzoo's first single entitled "The Beautiful Decay", produced by 9th Wonder, was leaked Duck Down Records' and Skyzoo's YouTube channel. The music video, released on the July 30, is directed by Artemus Jenkins, and sets out to reflect life in the various boroughs of New York.

External videos
- Skyzoo - "The Necessary Evils" (Music Video) (May 13, 2009)

Following the release of the album, a video for the song "Popularity" was made and released on November 18, 2009. The video, directed by Todd Angkasuwan, is a parody on the popular high-school drama Saved by the Bell.

Restless Films director Court Dunn directed the video for the third single "Easy To Fly" which features underground R&B singer Carlitta Durand. Released on March 15, 2010, the video is an ode to the legendary film "Love Jones". Skyzoo plays as Darius Lovehall, and model Ashlee Ray as Nina Mosley.

On April 21, 2010, Skyzoo released a video for the song "My Interpretation", the final single of the album. The video is directed by Artemus Jenkins who also directed "The Beautiful Decay".

== Track listing ==
No.	Title	Producer(s)	Length
1.	"The Opener / Intro"	Cyrus Tha Great	5:56
2.	"Return of the Real"	Just Blaze	4:13
3.	"The Beautiful Decay"	9th Wonder	3:54
4.	"My Interpretation"	Best Kept Secret	3:45
5.	"Popularity"	Nottz	3:49
6.	"Like a Marathon"	9th Wonder	3:37
7.	"The Shooter's Soundtrack"	Cyrus Tha Great	5:37
8.	"Under Pressure"	9th Wonder	3:55
9.	"Penmanship"	Black Milk	2:52
10.	"Dear Whoever"	Illmind	4:15
11.	"For What It's Worth"	Eric G.	4:53
12.	"The Necessary Evils"	Needlz	3:42
13.	"Easy to Fly" (featuring Carlitta Durand)	9th Wonder	4:29
14.	"Bottom Line"	Eric G.	3:50
15.	"Metal Hearts"	9th Wonder	3:34
16.	"Maintain"	Nottz; Keleigh Reid (co.)	4:54
Total length:			1:07:15

Sample credits

- "The Opener" contains a sample of "December Will Be Magic Again" by Kate Bush
- "Return of the Real" contains a sample of "Dreams" by Stark Reality
- "The Beautiful Decay" contains a sample of "How Love Hurts" by The Sylvers
- "My Interpretation" contains a sample of "Back to the Projects" by Johnny "Hammond" Smith
- "Like A Marathon" contains a sample of "When Will My Love Be Right" by Robert Winters & Fall
- "Under Pressure" contains a sample of "Walk On By" by The Undisputed Truth
- "Dear Whoever" contains a sample of "No One Can Love You More" by Phyllis Hyman
- "Easy to Fly" contains a sample of "Seven Long Years" by Bedlam
- "Bottom Line" contains a sample of "It's Got to Change" by Lou Ragland
- "Metal Hearts" contains a sample of " I'm Gonna Love You Just a Little More, Babe" by Barry White
- "For What It's Worth" contains a sample of "My Lonely Room" by Dee Dee Bridgewater
- "Maintain" contains a sample of "Pretty Flower" by Harold Melvin & the Blue Notes

== Personnel ==
- Gregory "Skyzoo" Taylor – vocals, executive producer
- Carlitta Durand – vocals (track 13)
- Cyrus Alexander – producer (tracks: 1, 7)
- Justin "Just Blaze" Smith – producer (track 2)
- Patrick "9th Wonder" Douthit – producer (tracks: 3, 6, 8, 13, 15), executive producer
- Craig Inocencio Balmoris – producer (track 4)
- Dominick "Nottz" Lamb – producer (tracks: 5, 16)
- Curtis "Black Milk" Cross – producer (track 9)
- Ramon "Illmind" Ibanga Jr. – producer (track 10)
- Eric Gabouer – producer (tracks: 11, 14)
- Khari "Needlz" Cain – producer (track 12)
- Keleigh Reid – co-producer (track 16)
- DJ Nyce – co-executive producer
- Rick Caps – co-executive producer
- Kenyatta "Buckshot" Blake – associate executive producer
- Drew "Dru-Ha" Friedman – associate executive producer

== Charts ==
Chart performance for The Salvation
Chart (2009)	Peak position
US Billboard 200	126
US Heatseekers Albums (Billboard)	4
US Independent Albums (Billboard)	16
US Indie Store Album Sales (Billboard)	14
