= For the Record (Torae album) =

Studio album by Torae
- Released: November 1, 2011
- Recorded: October 2010 – May 2011
- Genre: East Coast hip hop
- Length: 48:38
- Label: Internal Affairs Entertainment, Fat Beats
- Producer: Eric G.; DJ Premier; Pete Rock; Illmind; Marco Polo; 9th Wonder; Nottz; Large Professor; Diamond D; Fatin; E. Jones

Torae chronology
Double Barrel (2009)	For the Record (2011)	Off the Record (2012)

Singles from For the Record
- 1. "That Raw" Released: October 14, 2011; 2. "Do the Math" Released: January 16, 2012

For the Record is the debut studio album by American rapper Torae, released on November 1, 2011 via his own imprint Internal Affairs Entertainment, in conjunction with Fat Beats Distribution. It was preceded by the collaborative project Double Barrel in 2009 with producer Marco Polo.

The album was executive produced by Torae, along with Rich "Filthy Rich" Ahee and Amber Ravenel. The music production was handled by renowned beatsmiths DJ Premier, Large Professor, Diamond D, and Pete Rock, as well as 9th Wonder, Illmind, and Marco Polo among others. The sole guest appearances are provided by Wes, Pav Bundy and MeLa Machinko. The album was mastered by Ricardo Gutierrez at Stadium Red in New York City. The album was supported by two singles – "That Raw" produced by Pete Rock, and "Do the Math" produced by Large Professor.

== Critical reception ==
Professional ratings
Review scores
Source	Rating
DJBooth	4/5
HipHopDX	4/5 stars
HipHopSite.Com	4/5 stars
KevinNottingham	8/10 stars
Okayplayer	87/100
RapReviews	7.5/10

Upon its release, For the Record received generally favorable reviews from music critics. In his review for HipHopSite.Com, Nene Wallace Reed observed that "Three things help to make Torae the artist he is; his raw talent, his ear for production and his honesty. The combination of the three make the album a winner. For the Record is not only a strong introduction to Torae as an individual, it's out and out one of the best albums of 2011." Jeff Leon of KevinNottingham wrote, "Torae delivers a solid ode to Hip Hop and a declaration of who he is and where he wants to go. Not all the beats on the record work perfectly and the emcee still has room to grow, but with this one, Torae leaves an indelible mark and shows that he's well on his way to becoming a Hip Hop heavyweight."

RapReviews founder Steve "Flash" Juon wrote, "There is nothing bad or whack about For the Record, so it may just be that at only 48 minutes long I'm simply disappointed there wasn't more content. Then again it may be that Torae suffers from Brooklynite soundalike syndrome, because to some degree he comes across like a less charismatic Jay-Z or Saigon, and as dope as his lines are they are often lacking in forceful intent." Will Georgi wasn't hesitant to dub the album a classic. Writing for Okayplayer, he believed that "For the Record is the sound of a sharp MC rhyming over some dope beats from some of the best producers in the scene. If that doesn't make it a classic record, I don't know what is." DJBooth reviewer Nathan S. wrote, "It'd be a mistake to stick the ol' 'underground' label on For the Record – you don't have to have a backpack full of Krylon to enjoy it – but it's safe to say Torae's not aiming for crossover radio success. This is a hip-hop album for people who love hip-hop and who want to hear the music they love, not the music a radio programmer thinks they should love."

== Track listing ==
No.	Title	Writer(s)	Producer(s)	Length
1.	"Intro"	W. Brumfield; T. Carr; S.N. Corso; N.A. Weston	Torae	1:43
2.	"Alive" (featuring Wes)	W. Brumfield; T. Carr	Khrysis	3:49
3.	"You Ready"	M. Bruno; T. Carr	Marco Polo	4:16
4.	"What It Sound Like" (featuring Pav Bundy)	T. Carr; R. Ibanga Jr.	Illmind	3:43
5.	"Shakedown"	T. Carr; P. Douthit	9th Wonder	3:06
6.	"That Raw"	T. Carr; P. Phillips	Pete Rock	4:06
7.	"Do the Math"	T. Carr; W.P. Mitchell	Large Professor	4:00
8.	"Changes"	T. Carr; J. Kirkland	Diamond D	1:54
9.	"Over You" (featuring Wes)	T. Carr	E. Jones	3:52
10.	"Imagine"	W. Brumfield; T. Carr; E. Gabouer	Eric G.	3:01
11.	"Only Way (Interlude)"	P. Douthit	9th Wonder	0:52
12.	"For The Record"	T. Carr; C. Martin	DJ Premier	3:42
13.	"Thank You"	T. Carr; D. Lamb	Nottz	3:39
14.	"Reflection"	T. Carr; E. Gabouer	Eric G.	3:38
15.	"Panorama" (featuring Mela Machinko)	T. Carr; F. Horton	Fatin	3:19

Vinyl bonus track
No.	Title	Writer(s)	Producer(s)	Length
16.	"Only Way"	T. Carr; P. Douthit	9th Wonder	1:39

Sample credits

- "Shakedown" contains a sample of "Legend of the Ninja" as performed by Alfredo Chen Singers;
- "Do The Math" contains a sample of "Capture (Militia, Pt. 3)" as performed by Gang Starr, Big Shug and Freddie Foxxx; "Life As..." as
- "For the Record" contains a sample of "Eclipse" as performed by Ahmad Jamal; "What's Happenin'" as performed by Method Man and Busta Rhymes; Redman's verse in LL Cool J's "4, 3, 2, 1"; "Likwit" as performed by Tha Alkaholiks;
- "Thank You" contains a sample of "Thank You Baby" as performed by Betty Wright.

== Personnel ==
Credits for For the Record adapted from AllMusic.

- Rich "Filthy Rich" Ahee — engineer, executive producer, mixing, producer
- Wesley "Wes" Brumfield — featured artist, vocals
- Pav Bundy — featured artist
- Torae "Torae" Carr — engineer, executive producer, primary artist, producer
- Matt Conaway — publicity
- Shawna Nichol Corso — vocals
- Ejor Danill — artwork
- DJ E Holla — vocals
- DJ Premier — engineer, mixing, producer
- Patrick "9th Wonder" Douthit — engineer, producer, vocals
- Eric "Eric G." Gabouer — producer
- Ricardo Gutierrez — mastering
- Fatin "Fatin" Horton — engineer, producer
- Ramon "Illmind" Ibanga Jr. — mixing, producer
- Calvin Jones — mixing
- Eric "E. Jones" Jones — producer
- Khrysis — producer
- Joseph "Diamond D" Kirkland — producer
- Gary Lubansky — engineer
- MeLa Machinko — featured artist
- Marco Polo — engineer, producer
- William Paul "Large Professor" Mitchell — producer
- Joe Nardone — mixing
- Nottz — engineer, mixing, producer, vocals
- Peter "Pete Rock" Phillips — producer
- Rah Digga — vocals
- Amber Ravenel — executive producer
- Marion O. Ross III — trumpet
- D. Sloan — engineer, mixing
- Noah Abraham Weston — vocals
