= Torae =

American rapper

- Torae in 2010

Background information
- Also known as: Da Young Veteran; Young Vet; Tor; Toreezy; Reezy
- Born: Torae Liston Carr; March 18, 1977 (age 49)
- Origin: Brooklyn, New York, U.S.
- Genres: Hip-hop
- Years active: 1996–present
- Label: Internal Affairs Entertainment

Torae Liston Carr (born March 18, 1977), known mononymously as Torae, is an American rapper from the Coney Island section of Brooklyn, New York. He has released a number of solo albums and collaborative works, and operates the independent record label Internal Affairs Entertainment.

== Career ==
Torae gained recognition by collaborating with DJ Premier and Marco Polo. After releasing his debut mixtape Daily Conversation in 2008, he and Polo went on to receive critical acclaim for their collaborative LP entitled Double Barrel. In 2007, HipHopDX featured him in their DXNext underground hip-hop series. In the same year, he was named Chairman's Choice in XXL. In addition to Polo and Premier, Torae has worked with producers Eric G., Black Milk, and Khrysis. Torae has collaborated frequently with fellow Brooklyn MCs Skyzoo and Sha Stimuli. He has also worked with Tash of Tha Alkaholiks, Teflon, Chaundon, Sean Price, Masta Ace, Wale, Nefew, and Talib Kweli.

He released his debut studio album, For the Record, on November 1, 2011. The album features the production from Pete Rock, Large Professor, DJ Premier, and the Grammy Award-winning 9th Wonder. The following year, he released an EP entitled Off the Record, which comprises eight songs recorded during the making of his debut album. On May 27, 2014, he and fellow Brooklyn rapper Skyzoo released their collaborative album, Barrel Brothers. Carr ghost writes for many female rappers.

== Selected discography ==
- 2008: Daily Conversation, Album
- 2009: Double Barrel, Album (with Marco Polo)
- 2011: Heart Failure, EP
- 2011: For the Record, Album
- 2012: Off the Record, EP
- 2013: Admission of Guilt, Mixtape
- 2014: Barrel Brothers, Album (with Skyzoo as Barrel Brothers)
- 2016: Entitled, Album
- 2018: All Praises Due, Album
- 2023: Midnight Run, Album (with Marco Polo)

== Complete discography ==
- TORAE - "Just Dat Simple" from Unsigned Artists Vol.1 (1996) UNSIGNED ARTISTS ENTERTAINMENT
- TORAE - "Party On" "Lick A Shot" from Unda' Investigation, EP (1997) AFFINITY RECORDINGS
- TORAE - "Gimme The Mic" b/w "Spice Thang", 12" single (1998) INTERNAL AFFAIRS ENTERTAINMENT
- TORAE - Coney Island's Finest, EP (2001) INTERNAL AFFAIRS ENTERTAINMENT
- The Co. {Coalescence} - "Promises" b/w "T.I.M.E.", 12" single (2006) AV8 RECORDS
- 9th Wonder - "Merchant of Dreams" from The Dream Merchant Vol. 2, Album (2007) 6 HOLE RECORDS
- Born Talent - "Deep With The Lyrical" from The Essence, Album (2007) 54 SIDE RECORDS
- Dela - "Just Chill" from Atmosphere Airlines, Album (2007) DRINK WATER MUSIC
- Skyzoo & TORAE - "Get It Done" b/w "Click", 12" single (2007) FAT BEATS RECORDS
- Chaundon - "3 Kings", "Told You That" from Carnage, Album (2008) DEFEND MUSIC
- DJ K.O. - "Someday", "3 In The Chamber", "That Knack" from Picture This, Album (2008) SHAMAN WORKS
- eMC - "Backstage" from The Show, Album (2008) M3 RECORDS
- Khrome - "Grizzly" from The Beasts Released, Album (2008) GODSENDANT MUSIC
- Medinah Starr - "Beauty and Pain" from Serious Intermission, Album (2008) INTROSPECT RECORDS
- Pumpkin Head - "Hands High" from Picture That, Album (2008) SOULSPAZM RECORDS
- Shabaam Sahdeeq - "Keep Comin" from Relentless, Album (2008) MARVIAL, LLC
- Statik Selektah - "Destined To Shine" from Stick 2 The Script, Album (2008) SHOWOFF RECORDS
- Supastition - "It's All Over" from Leave Of Absence, Album (2008) DOMINATION RECORDS
- DJ JS1 - "Bang Da Underground" from No Sellout, Album (2009) GROUND ORIGINAL/FAT BEATS RECORDS
- DJ Spinna - "Lyrics Is Back" from Sonic Smash, Album (2009) HIGH WATER MUSIC
- El Da Sensei & The Returners - "Money [Part 2]" from The Money, EP (2009) COALMINE RECORDS
- Keelay & Zaire - "Saturday" from Prelude To Drive, EP (2009) MYX MUSIC LABEL
- Lee Bannon - "A New Song" from Me & Marvin, Album (2009) TOY BOX MUSIC
- Marco Polo & TORAE - Double Barrel, Album (2009) DUCK DOWN RECORDS
- Marco Polo & TORAE - "Double Barrel" b/w "Hold Up" & "Combat Drills", 12" single (2009) DUCK DOWN RECORDS/FAT BEATS
- Rapper Big Pooh - "It's A Go" from The Delightful Bars, Album (2009) HALL OF JUSTUS
- Sha Stimuli - "What's Wrong With That? (Wake Up The World)" from My Soul To Keep, Album (2009) CHAMBER MUSIK
- Shuko - "Super M.C.S." from The Foundation, Album (2009) COALMINE RECORDS
- Statik Selektah - "Destined To Shine (Obama Remix)" from Grand Theft Auto IV: The Lost & Damned (Special Edition), EP (2009) SHOWOFF RECORDS
- Beat*Society & DJ K.O. - "That Knack", "3 In The Chamber", "Someday" from Master Thieves 02: Picture These Remixes, Album (2010) SOULSPAZM RECORDS
- Cimer Amor - "Another Classic" from Another Classic, EP (2010)
- Cold Heat - "When It Rains" from Life Behind Bars (2010) GROUND ORIGINAL/SOULSPAZM RECORDS
- Steele of Smif-N-Wessun - "Amerikkka's Nightmare" from Amerikkka's Nightmare, Pt. 2 Children of War, Album (2010) DUCK DOWN RECORDS
- Little Brother - "24" from Left Back, Album (2010) HALL OF JUSTUS
- M7 - "U Gotta Love It" from NYC The 5 Boroughs, Album (2010) M7 RECORDS
- Marco Polo - "Combat Drills", "Exile Radio Remix" from The Stupendous Adventures of Marco Polo, Album (2010) DUCK DOWN RECORDS
- Statik Selektah - "Get Out" from 100 Proof: The Hangover, Album (2010) SHOWOFF RECORDS
- M-Dot & DJ Jean Maron - "Be Easy" from Run MPC, Album (2010) SOULSPAZM/EMS PRODUCTIONS
- TORAE - Heart Failure, EP (2011) INTERNAL AFFAIRS ENTERTAINMENT/SOULSPAZM
- Dela (with MeLa Machinko) - "Just Chill" from "Atmosphere Airlines Vol. 1"' Album (2011)
- TORAE - For the Record, Album (2011) INTERNAL AFFAIRS ENTERTAINMENT
- TORAE - Off the Record, EP (2012) INTERNAL AFFAIRS ENTERTAINMENT/SOULSPAZM
- TORAE - Black Christmas, EP (2012) INTERNAL AFFAIRS ENTERTAINMENT
- Barrel Brothers (Skyzoo & TORAE) - Barrel Brothers (2014) First Generation Rich, INC./INTERNAL AFFAIRS ENT.

== Mixtapes ==
- TORAE - Make Room At The Top (2003) INTERNAL AFFAIRS ENTERTAINMENT
- DJ Vega Benetton - "Freestyle" from Streets of New York (2004)
- Skyzoo - "Blackout" from The City's Favorite (2005)
- Marco Polo & Mick Boogie - "Casualty", "Good God" from Newport Authority (2007)
- Skyzoo - "Get It Done", "Click", "They Don't Want It" from Corner Store Classic (2007)
- Legend, DJ Nice & Statik Selektah - "Intro" from Back To Basics (2008)
- Mick Boogie - "Hand On The Pump" from Mick Boogie Presents – The Honor Roll (2008)
- Sha Stimuli & DJ Victorious - "Bentley" from The Secret (2008)
- Sha Stimuli & DJ Victorious - "Coulda Been Me" from Sha Stimuli & DJ Victorious Presents March On Washington (2008)
- Tanya Morgan - "Shake It Off" from Tanya Morgan Is A Rap Group (2008)
- TORAE - Daily Conversation (2008) INTERNAL AFFAIRS ENT./FAT BEATS
- TORAE - Allow Me To Reintroduce Myself (2008) INTERNAL AFFAIRS ENTERTAINMENT
- DJ Concept, Marco Polo & TORAE - Armed & Dangerous (2009)
- Cambatta - "Smooth Flight" from The Visionary (2009)
- DJ Concept Presents Skyzoo, Chaundon, & TORAE - Three Kings (2009)
- DJ Critical Hype - "Intro", "Wack DJ's", "Outro" from DJ Critical Hype presents Marco Polo Blends (2009)
- Lee Bannon - "A New Song" from Me & Marvin (2009)
- Mr. Mecca - "Over Here" from The Cover Run (2009)
- Sean Price - "Duck Down" from Kimbo Price (2009) DUCK DOWN RECORDS
- Various Artists - "Smoke", "Get It Done", "Duck Down" from Duck Down Records Presents Download The Right Thing (2009)
- Various Artists - "Pardon Me" from Illroots.com & Subconscious Threads Present – Spring Cleaning (2009)
- DJ Quiz - "Freestyle" from Quiz Knows (2010)
- Mick Boogie/NVME & Duck Down Records - "Talk Shit" from Survival Kit (2010)
- Reks - "Rapanomics" from Between The Lines (2010)
- Wale & 9th Wonder - "Sharp" from Back To The Feature (2010) 9TH WONDER PRESENTS
- TORAE - Heart Failure (2011) INTERNAL AFFAIRS ENT.
- E Holla & TORAE - Allow Me To Reintroduce Myself 2 (2012) INTERNAL AFFAIRS ENT.
- TORAE - Admission of Guilt (2013) INTERNAL AFFAIRS ENT.
