= Café Belga =

Studio album by Polish rapper Taco Hemingway

Studio album by Taco Hemingway
- Released: July 13, 2018
- Recorded: January–June 2018
- Genre: Hip-hop; alternative hip-hop; trap; pop rap
- Length: 45:15
- Label: Taco Corps, Asfalt Records (CD)
- Producer: Rumak, Borucci

Taco Hemingway chronology
0,25 mg (2018)	Café Belga (2018)	Pocztówka z WWA, lato '19 (2018)

Café Belga is the second studio album by Polish rapper Taco Hemingway, released on 13 July 2018 under the labels Taco Corp and Asfalt Records. The album was made available a day earlier on the rapper's website and YouTube. Recorded between January and June 2018, the album was produced by Rumak and Borucci. The physical version of the release came with a bonus mini-album, Flagey. The album represents a hip-hop style with influences from trap and pop. Its main theme is a critique of the contemporary world, particularly the issues of popularity and the lack of anonymity.

Café Belga received mixed reviews from music critics. Reviewers particularly praised it in comparison to the rapper's previous solo album, noting the improvement in lyricism and successful production. On the other hand, the album was criticized for its monothematic nature and the use of singing. The album was nominated for a Fryderyk award in the "Album of the Year – Hip-Hop" category. It achieved commercial success, receiving high streaming numbers and debuting at number one on the nationwide OLiS sales chart. The Polish Society of the Phonographic Industry awarded it a platinum certification for selling over 30,000 copies in Poland. Additionally, it became the 11th best-selling album in Poland in 2018.

As part of the album's promotion, Hemingway went on the Café Belga Tour, which included concerts in Poland, the United Kingdom, and Ireland.

== Origins, recording, and release ==
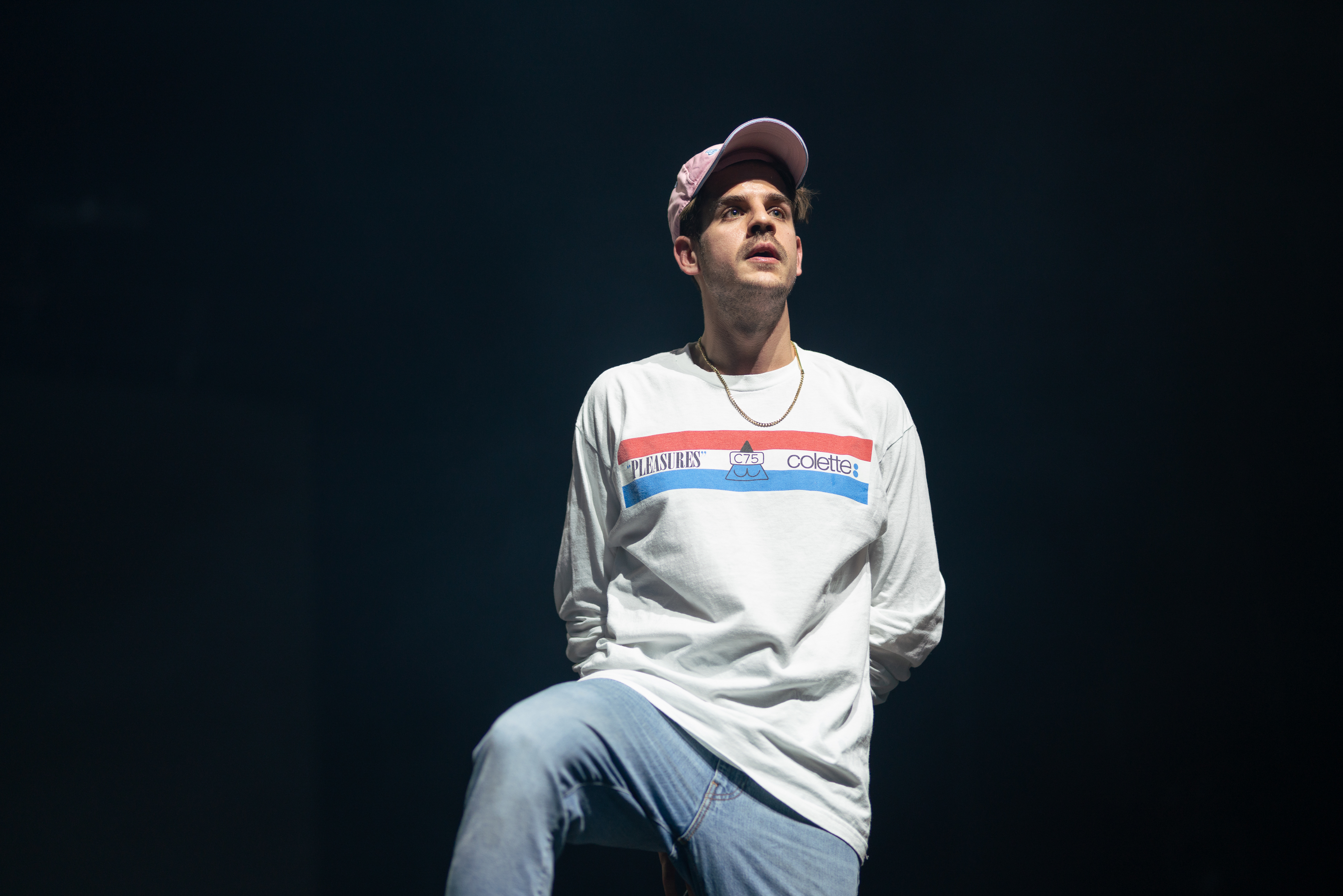
Taco Hemingway during a concert in April 2018

The recording of Café Belga began in January 2018. It was recorded at Studio Nagrywarka in Warsaw, with long-time collaborators Rumak and Borucci handling production. The album's title references the Café Belga in Brussels. The song incorporates snippets of an interview Hemingway gave to journalist Marek Fall in Café Belga on 15 May 2018. The recording concluded in June 2018. The album's cover art was created by Łukasz Partyka, Sonia Szóstak, and Piotr Dudek.

The album was released on 13 July 2018 in Empik stores, Asfalt Shop, and streaming services. Initially, the release was intended to have no prior announcement or promotion. However, despite instructions not to release the album before July 13, an Empik employee leaked information of the album and cover art online a day earlier. As a result, Hemingway expedited the release, uploading the entire album to YouTube on July 12, offering it for free digital download on his website, and starting pre-sales in the Asfalt Shop. The physical version of Café Belga included the bonus mini-album Flagey and an interview recording with Marek Fall. On 20 July 2018, Flagey was also made available on streaming services and YouTube.

== Analysis and interpretation ==
According to Rafał Samborski from the Interia.pl portal, the album mainly represents trap music. However, a critic from the Soul Bowl portal suggested: "You can expect less trap and more pop". Piotr Markowicz from Noizz.pl compared the production to Hemingway's earlier work: "departing from post-trap schemes towards a more spiritual and vaporwave electronic style". According to Maciej Wierno from Noizz.pl, Café Belga has a "stronger and more difficult-to-digest" tone compared to Hemingway's previous solo work, Szprycer (2017). Michał Cieślak from Rzeczpospolita called the album's sound a "synthesis of all the styles the rapper has recorded in". Bartłomiej Ciepłota from the Glam Rap portal noted that the album stylistically refers to Hemingway's early work. Jarek Szubrych from Gazeta Wyborcza remarked that the album's musical layer includes "slow beats that harmonize well with humming under the breath, as well as dynamic tracks that could be danced to".

According to Marcin Nowak from RapDuma, "we are dealing with technical rap based on real talk". Samborski wrote: "There is less play with flow here, which was present in Taconafide. This doesn't mean anything bad: in Taco's lazy flow, there's more fluidity, more emotion in the voice, and more tempo fluctuations". Wierno stated that Hemingway "boldly modulates his voice" and, compared to previous recordings, "uses accelerations more often". Łukasz Łachecki from CKM wrote that "despite attempts at technical experiments – accelerations, multi-syllabic rhymes, or enjambment – we still get the impression of encountering monotonous, rap staccato". The rap is interspersed with sung sections where Auto-Tune effects were used. Nowak observed that Hemingway uses double rhymes.

The main theme of the album is a critique of fame and the inability to live a normal life as a public figure. According to critics, the album represents a worldview of decadence. The rapper addresses the problem of depression, not only his own but also that of teenagers. Jacek Sobczyński from the Newonce portal suggested that the main theme of the album is "loneliness at the top". According to Sebastian Łupak from Wirtualna Polska, Hemingway describes his own world, which is "boring, blasé, repetitive, and nondescript". Cieślak summarized the album by saying: "Taco, blasé or perhaps tired of the hustle and bustle of Warsaw and the commercial success of Taconafide, heads towards Brussels to detach once again from the demons of fame". Hemingway also returns to the main themes of his first two EPs, Trójkąt warszawski (2014) and Umowa o dzieło (2015) – presenting himself as an observer of Warsaw's party life and expressing his observations on this subject. The album also contains love themes. The rapper makes numerous pop culture references – to movies, TV shows, and famous figures.

=== Tracks ===
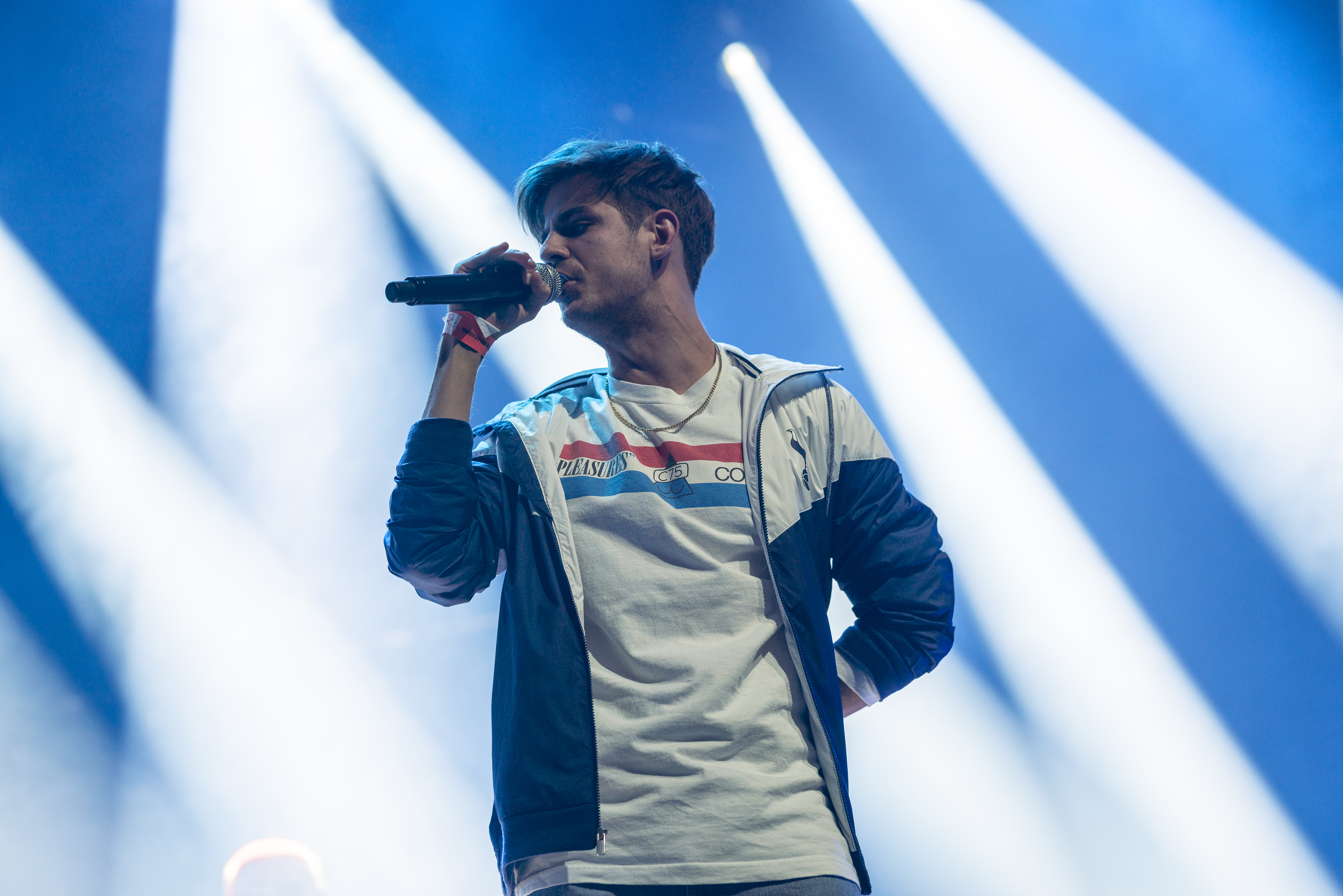
Taco Hemingway during a concert in April 2018

The title track Café Belga revolves around escaping fame to the titular café in Brussels, where the lyrical subject feels anonymous. According to Sobczyński, Hemingway employs a "slightly punk vocal" in the chorus, referencing the band Cool Kids of Death. Samborski wrote that "Borucci layers a simple, somewhat melancholic melody on something that sounds like a mix of an mbira and a vibraphone". In ZTM, Hemingway raps about longing for peaceful rides on Warsaw's public transportation, now impossible due to his fame. The song prominently features metaphors based on pop culture figures and events. Łachecki described the track as a "diluted copy of Migos' T-Shirt". Szubrycht called Wszystko na niby a modern equivalent of the song Artyści by Kazik na Żywo. The track critiques the artificiality and hypocrisy of the artistic community and responds to accusations against Hemingway of insincerity. The lyrical subject also addresses false perceptions of celebrities among young fans. Samborski noted that Rumak "combines a plastic bass taken straight from the basic sounds of a Minimoog with spacious, almost ambient echoes". In Reżyseria: Kubrick, Hemingway raps about overwork leading to a nervous breakdown. The lyrical subject compares his life to a film directed by Stanley Kubrick, with references to several of his works: The Shining (1980), 2001: A Space Odyssey (1968), A Clockwork Orange (1971), and Full Metal Jacket (1987). Samborski compared the track to the work of American rapper Drake.

In 2031, Hemingway envisions the future trajectory of his career, particularly when he is no longer popular. The verses present predictions for the years 2020, 2025, and 2031, and the lyrical subject critiques the mechanisms governing show business. Fiji is directed toward a woman. Samborski described its "catchy" beat as drawing from dancehall rhythms, while Łachecki noted its "afrotrap" style reminiscent of Taconafide. Sobczyński compared the song Abonent jest czasowo niedostępny to Drake's work and Taconafide's single Tamagotchi, calling Borucci's beat "bouncy". The lyrics explore romantic relationships. Sobczyński also wrote that Motorola is reminiscent of Taconafide and described it as a "strongly hikikomori track reflecting Huxley, Black Mirror, and a longing for a world that no longer exists". The song's main theme is the state of modern society and the belief that life was better in the past. Its trap-based sound, featuring synthesizers and drums, was likened by Łachecki to producer Zaytoven.

Modigliani reflects on Warsaw's residents, their parties, fascination with techno music, and the popularity of mephedrone. The lyrical subject paraphrases the song Szklana pogoda by Lombard – according to Przemysław Gulda of Gazeta.pl, the line "szklana pogoda, żyły niebieskie od mefedronu" ("glass-like weather, veins blue from mephedrone") serves as a metaphor for sociopolitical changes, particularly in urban life, that have taken place in Poland since Lombard's hit was released. Simultaneously, the lyrical subject compares himself to Italian painter Amedeo Modigliani. Sobczyński described the track as "dense, highly visual rap paired with Borucci's lazy beat, sounding like a drug-induced comedown at 4 AM", while Łachecki identified Metro Boomin as an influence. In Adieu, Rumak combines overdrive effects with piano sounds. 4 AM in Girona, performed in English, addresses escaping from Poland and its insincere Internet culture. The rapper references paparazzi and gossip media writing about him. The song ends with a dialogue from the film Cold War (2018), where an embassy worker from the Polish People's Republic accuses Wiktor Warski of lacking love for Poland and betraying Poles. Nowak compared the track to Drake's "5 AM in Toronto".

== Café Belga Tour ==
On 23 August 2018, Hemingway announced a concert tour titled Café Belga Tour, also revealing the date for the performance in Katowice. The remaining concerts were gradually announced over the following days.

== Reception ==
=== Critical reception ===
Professional reviews

Critics' ratings
- Work: Rating
Codzienna Gazeta Muzyczna	Star
Do Rzeczy	Star
Gazeta Wyborcza	Star
Glam Rap	Star Half star
Hip-hop.pl	Star
Interia.pl	Star
Polityka	Star
Spider's Web	Star

Jarek Szubrycht from Gazeta Wyborcza compared Café Belga to Hemingway's previous albums, stating that it was better written, with a more varied and successful musical layer. Dawid Bartkowki from the CGM portal wrote that the album "finally brings a lot of freshness to his [Hemingway's] discography" and called it "the return of Taco that you want to listen to until the end". Similarly, Dawid Kosiński from Spider's Web referred to it as "the return of the good old Taco Hemingway" after the "mishap" that was his collaborative album with Quebonafide, Soma 0,5 mg, and added that "the atmosphere of the album is enhanced by the brilliant beats of Rumak and Borucci". Marcin Flint from Rzeczpospolita praised the album for having less focus on Hemingway himself and his pretentiousness compared to previous albums, concluding his review: "Taco is again packed with clever wordplay and observations that are weapons of mass destruction. And we want to be hit". Jacek Sobczyński from Newonce wrote that "the individual details are picked up after the fifth or tenth listen. Taco is not only easy to listen to, but also something you want to listen into". Kamil Migoń from Popkiller called Café Belga the best album from Hemingway since his debut Young Hems (2013) and said: "He still writes brilliantly since the debut. He is one of the few rappers in the local market who can still surprise me in this area (sensitivity + observation skills + broad horizons)". Marcin Nowak from RapDuma especially praised the album's production and its double rhymes. Kamil Ziółkowski from Hip-hop.pl called Café Belga a good material, adding: "It's great that Taco's productions are varied, and the often-used tune, like in Szprycer (with good lyrics), does not poke the ears". Bartłomiej Ciepłota from Glam Rap called it the best album from Hemingway, especially praising the return to the style of his early recordings. The reviewer added: "It's hard to find another rapper in Poland today who handles words so well".

Przemysław Gulda from Gazeta.pl gave a mixed review, pointing out that some songs sounded like they were made in a hurry and were not polished, although there were "truly brilliant and monumental fragments". Gulda summarized: "Taco, still spinning in the same circle of themes repeated to the point of boredom, still manages to surprise with an unconventional approach and form that goes beyond the scheme he sometimes seems to fall into". Rafał Samborski from Interia.pl wrote in his review that Hemingway "is doing even better as a rapper and is on a good path to rediscover the missing fire in his pen" over the last few years. The critic particularly praised the production and more interesting ways of writing lyrics compared to previous recordings but criticized the recurring themes and awkward attempts at singing. Maciej Wernio from Noizz.pl called Café Belga "a solid album" and one of the best in Hemingway's discography, while commenting on the rapper's development: "Still, he does not quite manage to fight with his demons, such as over-productivity, blasé attitude, and the burden of being the self-proclaimed 'voice of a generation that has nothing to say'". Jakub Rusak and Łukasz Łachecki from CKM magazine praised the more mature lyrics compared to Soma 0,5 mg or Szprycer, but criticized the repetition of lyrical clichés, amateurish beats, and grotesque singing. Bartek Chaciński in his review for Polityka pointed out "apt references to both mass and less mainstream culture" and "ease in enchanting with comparisons", but criticized Hemingway for showing "slight fatigue with the convention" and overusing Auto-Tune. Similar accusations were made by Ilona Chylińska in Opcje, stating that while the lyrics and album concepts were positive, the rapping itself could be described as "mediocre", which was also linked to the excessive use of Auto-Tune.

A negative review was given by Sebastian Łupak from Wirtualna Polska, who criticized Hemingway for lacking ideas and monotony in the lyrics. He also added that "to increasingly bland and tasteless beats, Taco arranges increasingly less intricate rhymes". Michał Cieślak from Rzeczpospolita argued that "the rapper is a prisoner of his own style, and this time he lacked freshness, flair, and above all, sharpness in his lyrics". Grzegorz Brzozowicz from Do Rzeczy wrote that with this album, Hemingway "reached the peak of absurdity".

=== Commercial reception ===
In the first day after its release, the tracks from Café Belga were played over 3.3 million times on YouTube. The most popular track was Wszystko na niby, which, with over 610,000 listens, became the most played content on the platform in Poland. Within the first week, its views surpassed 2.5 million. Additionally, the album dominated the top 11 most-streamed songs by Polish users on the Spotify streaming platform.

On 26 July 2018, Café Belga debuted at number one on the OLiS chart, marking Taco Hemingway's third consecutive album (after Szprycer and Soma 0,5 mg) to achieve this feat. The next day, Asfalt Records announced that the album had reached the threshold for a Gold certification – awarded by the Polish Society of the Phonographic Industry for 15,000 physical copies sold in Poland – within two weeks of its release. On August 1, the Polish Society of the Phonographic Industry confirmed the certification. In its second week, Café Belga maintained its position at the top of the OLiS chart. On 7 October 2018, the Polish Society of the Phonographic Industry awarded the album a Platinum certification for selling 30,000 physical copies. This achievement also only accounts for physical sales.

Café Belga was the 11th best-selling album in Poland in 2018. In Spotify's end-of-year summary, it ranked fourth among the most-listened-to albums by Polish users, surpassed only by Soma 0,5 mg, Dua Lipa by Dua Lipa, and Małomiasteczkowy by Dawid Podsiadło. Taco Hemingway was the most-streamed artist overall.

=== Awards and nominations ===
Competition	Category	Result	Source
Fryderyki 2019	Album of the Year – Hip-Hop	Nomination	
Popkillery 2019	Album of the Year	25th place	
Popkillery 2019	Release of the Year	4th place	

== Track listing ==
No.	Song title	Production	Length
1.	Café Belga	Borucci	4:10
2.	ZTM	Borucci	4:40
3.	Wszystko na niby	Rumak	4:18
4.	Reżyseria: Kubrick	Rumak	3:32
5.	2031	Rumak	5:00
6.	Fiji	Borucci	4:03
7.	Abonent jest czasowo niedostępny	Borucci	4:34
8.	Motorola	Rumak	3:12
9.	Modigliani	Borucci	3:50
10.	Adieu	Rumak	4:47
11.	4 AM in Girona	Rumak, Borucci	3:09
Total			45:15

- Some tracks feature excerpts from an interview with Taco Hemingway by Marek Fall.
- The track 4 AM in Girona includes a clip from the film Cold War (2018), directed by Paweł Pawlikowski.

== Sales ==
=== Positions in OLiS charts ===
OLiS is a national chart compiled by the TNS Polska agency based on physical album sales (it does not include data on digital downloads or streaming plays).

==== Weekly chart rankings ====
Week	1	2	3	4	5	6	7	8	9	10	11	12	13	14	15	16	17	18
Position	1	1	2	3	3	4	2	6	12	9	11	14	21	22	25	22	22	32
Source																		

Week	19	20	21	22	23	24	25	26	27	28	29	30	31	32	32	34	35	36
Position	37	37	35	44	42	31	36	29	39	35	35	40	49	45	36	45	50	49
Source																		

==== Monthly chart rankings ====
Month	Position	Source
July 2018	1	
August 2018	2	

==== Yearly chart rankings ====
Year	Position	Source
2018	11	
2021	40	

=== Certifications ===
Music recording certifications are issued by the Polish Society of the Phonographic Industry for reaching a specified number of sold copies, based on physical and digital copies purchased, as well as streaming plays.

Certification	Number of copies	Date	Source
Gold Record	15,000	1 August 2018	
Platinum Record	30,000	7 October 2018	

== Personnel ==
The following individuals were responsible for the creation of the album:

- Filip Szcześniak – lyrics, vocals
- Piotr Dudek – cover design
- Marek Fall – interview author
- Jan Kwapisz – sound engineering
- Boris "Borucci" Neijenhuis – music production, additional vocals
- Łukasz Partyka – cover design
- Maciej "Rumak" Ruszecki – music production, additional vocals
- Rafał Smoleń – mixing, mastering
- Sonia Szóstak – cover design, photography
