= Podróż zwana życiem =

Studio album by O.S.T.R.
- Released: 23 February 2015
- Recorded: 2014–2015
- Genre: Hip-hop
- Label: Asfalt Records
- Producers: Killing Skills; ScoleX; O.S.T.R.

O.S.T.R. chronology
Jazz, dwa, trzy (2011)	Podróż zwana życiem (2015)	Życie po śmierci (2016)

Podróż zwana życiem (A Journey Called Life) is the thirteenth studio album by Polish hip-hop rapper and producer O.S.T.R., released on February 23, 2015, on Asfalt Records. The album features several guest appearances such by Sacha Vee and Cadillac Dale. The album was promoted with three singles, "Rise of the Sun" features Cadillac Dale, "Podróż zwana życiem" and "Ja ty my wy oni" both features a vocal by Sachą Vee. There was a promotional video clip accompanied to the first single.

It was entirely produced by Dutch duo Killing Skills and O.S.T.R., and two tracks were co-produced by ScoleX. According to Polish Society of the Phonographic Industry, on April 1, 2015, it went platinum, having sold over 30,000 copies. Due to the high selling, there were released limited editions of Pozdróż zwana życiem on blue vinyl and cassette tape. The album debuted at number 1 on the Polish OLiS chart.

== Track listing ==
No.	Title	Producer(s)	Length
1.	"Prolog" (featuring Sacha Vee)	Killing Skills; ScoleX (co-producer)	5:13
2.	"Nowy dzień"	Killing Skills	3:36
3.	"Hybryd"	Killing Skills	3:36
4.	"Hybryd" (featuring Sacha Vee)	Killing Skills	4:36
5.	"Pistolet do skroni" (featuring Sacha Vee)	Killing Skills	3:53
6.	"Podróż zwana życiem" (featuring Sacha Vee)	Killing Skills	4:33
7.	"Kraina karłów" (featuring Cadillac Dale)	Killing Skills	4:27
8.	"Rise of the Sun" (featuring Cadillac Dale)	Killing Skills	4:19
9.	"Post Scriptum" (featuring Sacha Vee; bass guitar Jacek Fedkowicz)	Killing Skills	4:24
10.	"Grawitacja"	Killing Skills	5:18
11.	"Nie do rozwiązania"	Killing Skills	3:39
12.	"Ja ty my wy oni" (featuring Sacha Vee)	Killing Skills	3:52
13.	"Keep Stabbing" (featuring Sacha Vee)	Killing Skills; ScoleX (co-producer)	3:45
14.	"Gdybym tylko chciał"	Killing Skills	3:32
15.	"Fizyka umysłu"	Killing Skills	3:54
16.	"Kilka zdań o..." (featuring Sacha Vee)	Killing Skills	4:47
17.	"Lubię być sam"	Killing Skills	5:59

== Prizes and awards ==
- "The best albums of 2015 - Poland" according to Gazeta Wyborcza and Agora SA - #10
