= Czesław Śliwa =

Polish con artist (1932–1971)

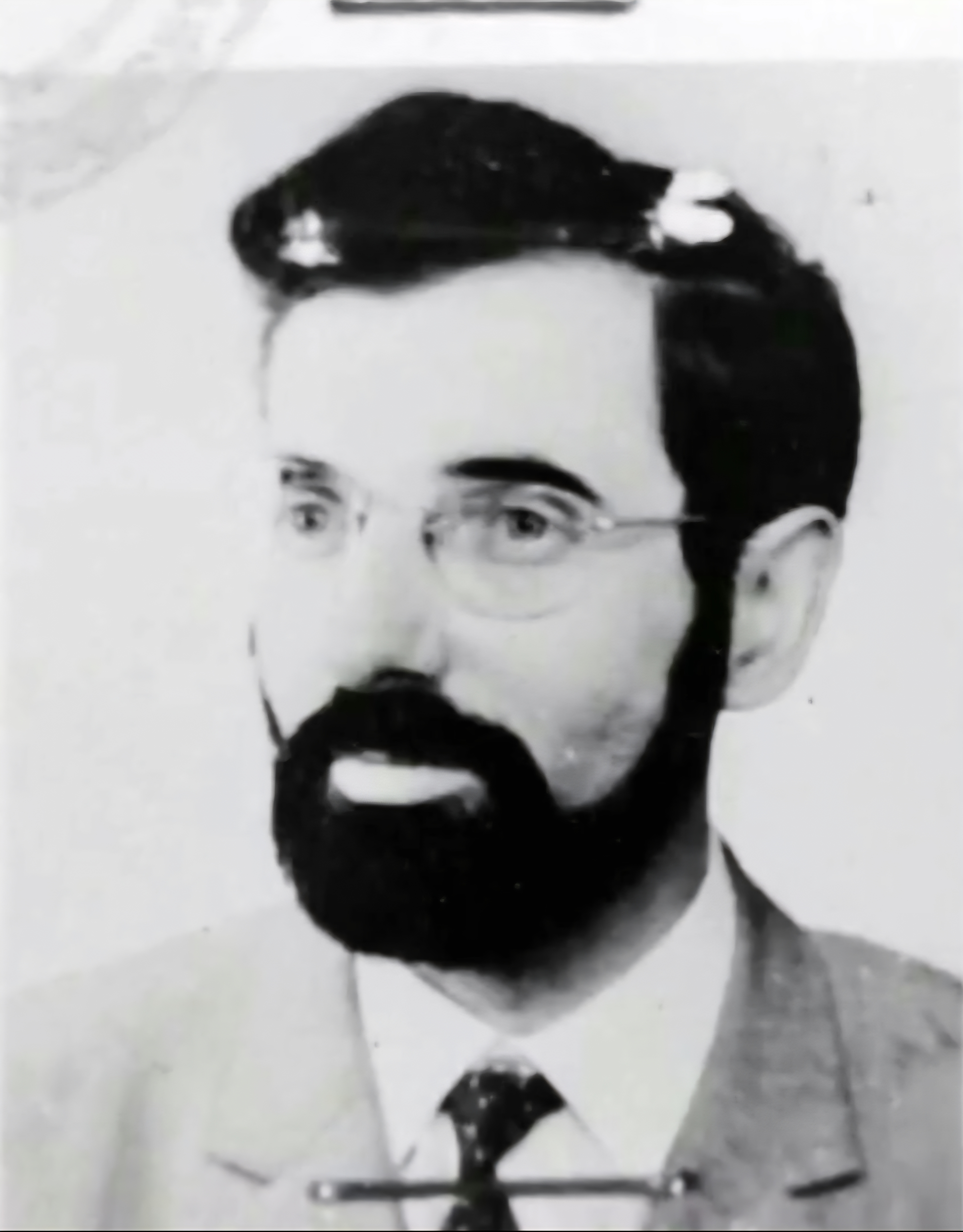
- Born: Jacek Silber; 3 July 1932; Rzeszów, Poland.
- Died: 18 November 1971 (aged 39); Wołów, Poland
- Other names: Jack Ben Silberstein; Jacek Zilbercfaig
- Occupation: con artist

Czesław Śliwa (born Jacek Silber 3 July 1932 – 18 November, 1971) is a Polish con artist, forger and a fake Austrian consul. He was also known by aliases Jack Ben Silberstein and Jacek Zilbercfaig.

== Early life and endeavors ==
He was born in Rzeszów in the Second Polish Republic to a Jewish family. His father owned a distillery as well as a farm in Błażowa next to Rzeszów. During the Nazi occupation, his parents placed him in the care of an acquaintance named Śliwa, who hid him until the end of World War II using fake documents under the name "Czesław Śliwa".

He completed his secondary education but did not pass the matura (matriculation) exam and began working as a tailor in Bytom. He used a forged master's degree diploma in textile engineering issued under the name of Jacek Elizeusz Zilbercfaig. He later moved to Wałbrzych, where, with the help of forged documents, he found employment as a mining rationalizer and expert. In 1958, he got married. At the wedding, he illegally appeared in a mining engineer uniform, which drew the attention of the Citizens' Militia. He was soon arrested and sentenced to seven years in prison, although he was released as a result of an amnesty in 1964.

== Fake consulate ==
At the beginning of September 1969, with the help of eight other people (a local taxi driver, two hairdressing students, a pedagogy student and a family of three Greek immigrants specializing in sheep farming, as well as another Greek friend of theirs), he organized a fake consulate general of Austria in Wrocław, declaring himself its head. The temporary headquarters of the "consul" was located in the Monopol Hotel in Wrocław, where he rented a room for half a year under the surname Silberstein, assuring the management that the embassy of Austria would pay for it. He managed to obtain fake seals, prepared for him by an employee of a stamp shop solely on the basis of a Silberstein consul's business card. In the same way, he also ordered official forms from the printing house. He himself made seals imitating the coat of arms of Austria, using other emblems with a double-headed eagle.

Substantial financial rewards were promised to his collaborators, whom he issued fake documents certifying their appointments as the consul's driver, consulate general secretary, economic attaché, and so on. In reality, these people were deceived too, as they would lend the fake consul money and provide him with unpaid services. Śliwa/Silberstein, together with the "consulate staff", would regularly travel around Poland in search of further victims. Because of his skills in document forgery and exceptional charisma, he managed to deceive local authorities that started preparing for the opening of a new diplomatic mission, emptying a kindergarten for that purpose. Śliwa/Silberstein also submitted his credentials (poorly written on a torn-out notebook page with a pencil) to the Office of Council of Ministers at the State Council headquarters.

His activities were then noticed by the Security Service, which nevertheless decided to arrest him only after the embassy of Austria protested against the payment to the Monopol Hotel after they were contacted in that matter. Śliwa was arrested for the second time on November 28, 1969. Even after being detained, he demanded to be referred to as Silberstein and claimed to be Austrian (which was quickly disproven, as Śliwa did not understand questions asked in German). Moreover, Śliwa attempted to convince the investigators that he was a Western spy who was tasked with the creation of an intelligence network consisting of people of Jewish heritage. At the same time, still in custody, he was sending letters to his victims, trying to extort additional funds "to cover attorney fees", all the while maintaining that he was an Austrian consul and the arrest was a mistake.

Despite the authorities' appeals, victims of Silberstein's fraud were reluctant to report to the police, fearing liability, mainly for illegal trading in foreign currencies. Those victims who showed up to testify during the trial—as noted by observers—usually showed no animosity towards Śliwa. Śliwa did not have a defense attorney. He represented himself and demanded to be referred to as Silberstein the entire time. After a trial lasting only four days, he was found guilty by the Wrocław district court on June 9, 1970, of fraud of over half a million złoty and sentenced to seven years' imprisonment and a fine of 200,000 złoty (changed to three additional years in prison). Lefteris Conis, who was tried with him, was sentenced for foreign exchange crimes to two years' imprisonment, suspended for five years. Another collaborator, 19-year-old Janina Sikorska (born 1951), received a one-year prison sentence, suspended for four years for presenting false documents.

== Imprisonment and death ==
During his stay at Wołów penitentiary Śliwa devoted himself to writing of patriotic poems, especially praising the communist regime and the state leaders. He wrote a couple hundred of them, most likely in an attempt to appease the government to be released ahead of full time.

He died in the penitentiary under unclear circumstances. According to one version, he was trying to arrange a move to a better facility by swallowing a metal object in order to simulate tuberculosis but died due to complications. He was buried at the Osobowice Cemetery in Wrocław. In 1994, his tomb was removed due to lack of payments.

== In popular culture ==
In 1970, Krzysztof Gradowski produced a documentary "Konsul" i inni in his albu, in which Czesław Śliwa describes his criminal career. The film received two minor awards in 1971.

In 1989, Mirosław Bork released a comedy Konsul based on the biography of Czesław Śliwa, for which film director received several awards in 1989 ans 1990.

In 2014, Polish rapper Taco Hemingway used fragments of Konsul i inni, picked from Polish Film Chronicle, as interludes in his album Trójkąt warszawski.
