= Pocztówka z WWA, lato '19 =

Album by rapper Taco Hemingway

- Standard cover

Studio album by Taco Hemingway
- Released: 23 July 2019
- Genres: Hip-hop, pop rap
- Length: 42:58
- Labels: Asfalt Records, Taco Corp

Taco Hemingway chronology
Café Belga (2018)	Pocztówka z WWA, lato '19 (2019)	Jarmark (2020)

Pocztówka z WWA, lato '19 is the third studio album by Polish rapper Taco Hemingway. It was released on 23 July 2019 by Taco Corp. The recordings were made available on the rapper's website and on YouTube. The material, recorded in the summer of 2019, was produced by multiple producers. The album represents a hip-hop style with pop influences. The main theme of the lyrics are stories about Warsaw and life in it.

The album was well received by music critics. The reviewers especially praised the artist for touching upon the political problems of Poles and for the apt descriptions of the surrounding society. The album was a great commercial success, recording very high results of streaming services and debuting at number one on the OLiS sales list, spreading in more than 90,000 copies. Furthermore, it was the tenth best-selling album of 2019 in Poland.

As part of the promotion of the release, Hemingway embarked on the Pocztówka z Polski Tour, covering major Polish cities.

== Background and release ==
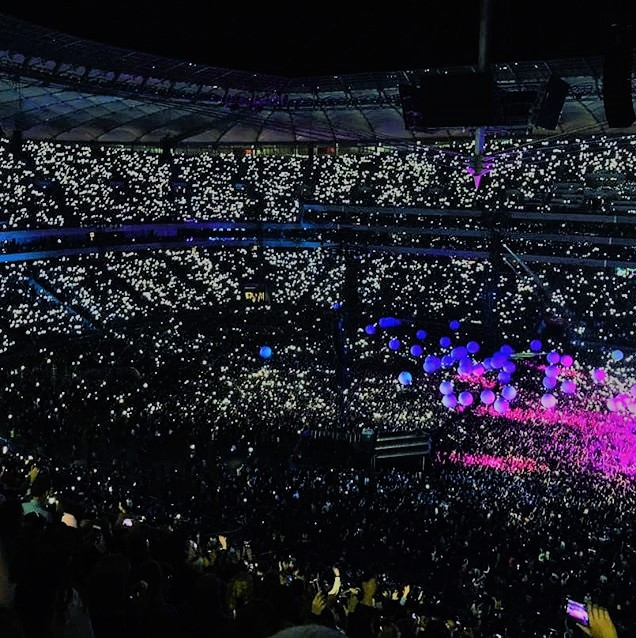
Taco Hemingway during a concert at the Stadion Narodowy, 2019

In the opening track of his previous album, Café Belga, the rapper announced a possible break from music in 2019, but on 7 July a photo appeared online in which the rapper could be seen during a recording session in the studio. On 9 February 2019 a snippet of the musician's new song leaked onto the Internet, which the label Asfalt Records tried unsuccessfully to remove. In April of the same year, on the Instagram profile of the recording studio in which the rapper works, a post appeared that confirmed the formation of the new album.

On 16 July 2019 the rapper announced the release of his new album Pocztówka z WWA, lato '19 on 9 August and pre-orders for the album have begun. The musician wrote on Instagram that despite the announced hiatus, he couldn't help himself and will release a new album in the summer like he does every year. On 23 July 2019 around 10pm the album was unexpectedly released on YouTube and streaming services such as Spotify among others, as always the rapper has made the entire album available for free MP3 download on his website.

On 9 August 2019 the album was released in a physical version for purchase at Asfalt Shop and Empik stores. The album was bought in pre-order in 15 thousand copies. The limited edition physical version of Pocztówka z WWA was accompanied by two tracks that were not included in streaming services. Full Metal Jacket is responsible for the graphic design of the album.

== Track listing ==
All tracks are written by Filip Szcześniak.

No.	Title	Writer(s)	Producer(s)	Length
1.	"Człowiek z dziurą zamiast krtani"	Szcześniak	Rumak	4:08
2.	"Antysmogowa maska w moim carry-on baggage" (featuring Pezet)	Szcześniak, Paweł Kapliński	2K	4:03
3.	"Leci nowy Future"	Szcześniak	2K, Sergiusz	3:40
4.	"W piątki leżę w wannie" (featuring Dawid Podsiadło)	Szcześniak, Dawid Podsiadło	Borucci	3:41
5.	"WWA VHS" (featuring Ras)	Szcześniak, Arkadiusz Sitarz	Rumak	4:42
6.	"Wytrawne (z nutą desperacji)"	Szcześniak	Catz 'n Dogz	3:11
7.	"Wyjek dobra rada"	Szcześniak	Empea	2:54
8.	"Tijuana" (featuring Kizo)	Szcześniak, Patryk Woziński	Rumak	3:17
9.	"Sanatorium" (featuring Dawid Podsiadło and Rosalie.)	Szcześniak, Podsiadło, Rosalie Hoffmann	Pham	4:34
10.	"Alert RCB" (featuring Schafter)	Szcześniak, Wojciech Laskowski	Zeppy Zep	3:20
11.	"Kabriolety"	Szcześniak	Zeppy Zep	5:28
Total length:				42:58:00

Deluxe edition
No.	Title	Writer(s)	Producer(s)	Length
12.	"Wielki Gatsby z benzynowej stacji"	Szcześniak	Rumak	3:40
13.	"Algorytm"	Szcześniak	Rumak	3:19
Total length:				49:57:00

=== Samples ===
- The song "Człowiek z dziurą zamiast krtani" uses dialogues from the film Miasto na wyspach directed by Jan Dmowski and Bohdan Kosiński and dialogues from the Polish Film Chronicle.
- The songs "Antysmogowa maska w moim carry-on baggage", "Leci nowy Future" and "WWA VHS" used dialogues from the Polish Film Chronicle.
- The song "WWA VHS" uses dialogues from the program Sylwestrowa Gawenda o Winie performed by Marek Kondrat.
- The songs "Wytrawne (z nutą desperacji)" and "Wujek dobra rada" use the dialogues from the film Teddy Bear (1981) directed by Stanisław Bareja.
- The song "Wujek dobra rada" uses samples from the songs "Dla dzieciaka" and "Tak miało być" by Molesta, "Za dużo widzę" by rapper Sokół, "RHX Trzyma straże" by RHX Skład and "Od dawna" by Grammatik.

== Charts ==
Chart (2019)	Peak position
OLiS	1
