= Życie po śmierci =

Studio album by O.S.T.R.
- Released: February 26, 2016
- Recorded: 2015
- Genre: Hip-hop
- Label: Asfalt Records
- Producers: Killing Skills; O.S.T.R.

O.S.T.R. chronology
Podróż zwana życiem (2015)	Życie po śmierci (2016)	W drodze po szczęście (2018)

Życie po śmierci (Polish pronunciation: [ˈʐɨt͡ɕɛ pɔ ˈɕmjɛrt͡ɕi], English: Life After Death), stylized as Życie po ~~śmierci~~) is an album by Polish hip-hop rapper and producer O.S.T.R., released on February 26, 2016 on Asfalt Records. O.S.T.R. said that the main factor that made him record Życie po śmierci was his disease he had at the beginning of 2015. He had to have his lung removed, due to the fact that he had been smoking for most of his life. He also claimed that this album is the most personal project he had ever recorded. The main inspiration for the title of the album was the Notorious B.I.G.'s 1997 project Life After Death. A special website was created to promote the album. On the website O.S.T.R. left a letter written to his fans, when he recalls a story of his disease and informs that Życie po śmierci is going to be a soundtrack for a "book or rap musical".

Życie po śmierci was entirely produced by O.S.T.R. and Dutch duo Killing Skills. The first single "We krwi (Since I Saw You)" was released on February 1, 2016. There was an extra CD entitled Życie po śmierci (Snap Jazz Edition) that could be bought only through Asfalt Records' official website and at the Asfalt Shop in Warsaw. The extra CD consists of jazz remixes produced by Killing Skills themselves and played by various jazz musician.

The album debuted at number 1 on Polish chart and having sold 150 000 copies up to April 19, 2023.

== Track listing ==
Rozdział I: Jak To Się Zaczęło
No.	Title	Writer(s)	Producer(s)	Length
1.	"Od Autora / Prolegomena"	Adam Ostrowski	Killing Skills; O.S.T.R.	1:06
2.	"We Krwi (Since I Saw You)" (featuring Playground Zer0)	A. Ostrowski	Killing Skills; O.S.T.R.	3:32
3.	"Diagnoza - wprowadzenie"	A. Ostrowski	Killing Skills; O.S.T.R.	0:30
4.	"Diagnoza"	A. Ostrowski	Killing Skills; O.S.T.R.	4:06

Rozdział II: Czarny Film...
No.	Title	Writer(s)	Producer(s)	Length
5.	"Kto gasi światło?"	A. Ostrowski	Killing Skills; O.S.T.R.	3:17
6.	"Miami ‐ wprowadzenie"	A. Ostrowski	Killing Skills; O.S.T.R.	0:38
7.	"Miami"	A. Ostrowski	Killing Skills; O.S.T.R.	3:53
8.	"Scenariusz sądnych dni"	A. Ostrowski	Killing Skills; O.S.T.R.	3:57

Rozdział III: Wyjście Na Prostą
No.	Title	Writer(s)	Producer(s)	Length
9.	"Spowiedź ‐ wprowadzenie"	A. Ostrowski	Killing Skills; O.S.T.R.	0:35
10.	"Spowiedź" (featuring Sacha Vee)	A. Ostrowski; Sacha Vee	Killing Skills; O.S.T.R.	4:11
11.	"Życie po śmierci"	A. Ostrowski	Killing Skills; O.S.T.R.	4:15
12.	"Bilans"	A. Ostrowski	Killing Skills; O.S.T.R.	3:22
13.	"Kropla wody ‐ wprowadzenie"	A. Ostrowski	Killing Skills; O.S.T.R.	0:31
14.	"Kropla wody"	A. Ostrowski	Killing Skills; O.S.T.R.	3:51

Rozdział IV: Repatriacja Mocy
No.	Title	Writer(s)	Producer(s)	Length
15.	"Raut"	A. Ostrowski	Killing Skills; O.S.T.R.	3:23
16.	"WudźTangClan ‐ wprowadzenie"	A. Ostrowski	Killing Skills; O.S.T.R.	0:33
17.	"WudźTangClan"	A. Ostrowski	Killing Skills; O.S.T.R.	2:19
18.	"Nie pisz SMS‐ów"	A. Ostrowski	Killing Skills; O.S.T.R.	4:16
19.	"Jaki ojciec taki syn ‐ wprowadzenie"	A. Ostrowski	Killing Skills; O.S.T.R.	0:32
20.	"Jaki ojciec taki syn" (featuring Ostry Junior I)	A. Ostrowski	Killing Skills; O.S.T.R.	3:07
21.	"To mój dzień ‐ wprowadzenie"	A. Ostrowski	Killing Skills; O.S.T.R.	0:39
22.	"To mój dzień" (featuring Steve Nash & Sacha Vee)	A. Ostrowski; S. Vee; Steve Nash	Killing Skills; O.S.T.R.	4:43
23.	"Epilog"	A. Ostrowski	Killing Skills; O.S.T.R.	4:12

== Charts and certifications ==
=== Weekly charts ===
Chart (2016)	Peak position
Polish Albums (ZPAV)	1

=== Certifications ===
Region	Certification	Certified units/sales
Poland (ZPAV)	Diamond	150,000^{‡}
^{‡} Sales+streaming figures based on certification alone.
