= 7 (O.S.T.R. album) =

Studio album by O.S.T.R.
- Released: 24 February 2006
- Genre: hip-hop
- Label: Asfalt

O.S.T.R. chronology
Szum Rodzi Hałas (2005)	7 (2006)	HollyŁódź (2007)

7 is the sixth studio album by Polish rapper O.S.T.R., released on 24 February 2006 on Asfalt Records. It was nominated for a Fryderyk award in 2006 in the "Album of the Year Club Music" category. It charted #2 on Billboard's "Hit of the World" for Poland.

== Track listing ==
No.	Title	English translation	Length
1.	"Intro"
2.	"Uwolnij To W Sobie"	Free It Within Yourself
3.	"Klub"	Club
4.	"Biegnij"	Run
5.	"Mówię Co Widzę"	I Describe What I See
6.	"Złość"	Anger
7.	"Rugby"
8.	"O Robieniu Bitów"	About Making Beats
9.	"Otwieram Drzwi"	I'm Opening The Door
10.	"Milion Euro"	Million Euro
11.	"Wydaj mnie"	Release Me or Betray Me
12.	"Opowieść"	Story
13.	"Kioskowy Skit"	Kiosk Skit
14.	"Polskie Komedie"	Polish Comedies
15.	"... (Zapomniałem Tytułu)"	... (I've Forgotten the Title)
16.	"Więcej Decybeli By Zagłuszyć..."	More Decibels To Jam...
17.	"PRL Kontrast"	PRL Contrast
18.	"Co Się U Nas Dzieje?"	What's Going on Here?
19.	"Perfect City"
20.	"Czy Warto?"	Is It Worth It?
21.	"Jedna Chwila"	One Moment
22.	"Ku Krytyce"	To The Critics
