= Kartagina =

Studio album by O.S.T.R. and Marco Polo
- Released: March 4, 2014
- Recorded: 2011–2013
- Genre: Hip-hop
- Length: 62:54
- Languages: Polish, English
- Label: Asfalt Records
- Producer: Marco Polo

O.S.T.R. chronology
Haos (2013)	Kartagina (2014)

Marco Polo chronology
PA2: The Director's Cut (2013)	Kartagina (2014)	A-F-R-O Polo (2016)

Kartagina (Polish: "Carthage") is an album by Polish rapper O.S.T.R. and Canadian producer Marco Polo, released on March 4, 2014 on Asfalt Records. According to ZPAV the album went gold before its official release having sold 15 000 copies by pre-order. It debuted on the Polish Album Chart at number one.

== Track listing ==
1. "Intro"
2. "Żywy lub martwy" (Dead or Alive)
3. "Side Effects" (feat. Cadillac Dale)
4. "Kartagina" (Carthage) (feat. Lil' Fame)
5. "Więzień własnych granic" (Prisoner of One's Own Borders)
6. "Hip Hop Hooligans" (feat. Hades, Main Flow, Torae)
7. "Hołd bloków absolwentom" (Homage to Graduates of Housing Projects)
8. "Długi" (Debts)
9. "Nie słuchać przed trzydziestką" (Do Not Listen Before the Age of Thirty)
10. "Shotgun (Moje zło to twój wybór)" (Shotgun (My Evil Is Your Choice))
11. "Dead Man Funk" (feat. First Division, Kochan)
12. "What Is the Question"
13. "Garri Kasparow"
14. "Miejmy to za sobą" (Let's Get It Over With)
15. "Przyjaciel diabła" (Devil's Friend)
16. "Ostatni Track" (The Last Track)
17. "Outro"

== Charts ==
Chart (2014)	Peak position
Polish Albums (ZPAV)	1

== Certifications ==
Region	Certification	Certified units/sales
Poland (ZPAV)	Gold	15,000^{*}
^{*} Sales figures based on certification alone.
