= 1980 (disambiguation) =

1980 was a leap year starting on Tuesday of the Gregorian calendar.

1980 may also refer to:

== Music ==
- 1980 (album), a 1980 album by Gil Scott-Heron
  - The title track to the album above
- "1980" (song), a 2004 song by Estelle
- "1980", a 1979 song by Herb Alpert from the album Rise
- "1980", a 2004 song by Pascal Obispo and Melissa Mars from the album Les Fleurs du bien
- "1980", a 2007 song by Dirt Nasty from the album Dirt Nasty
- "1980", a 2008 song by O.S.T.R. from the album Ja tu tylko sprzątam
- "1980", a 2008 song by Rehab
- "1980", a 2016 song by Reks from the album The Greatest X
- "Nineteen Eighty", a 2020 song by Joe Satriani from the album Shapeshifting
