= Jazzurekcja =

Studio album by O.S.T.R.
- Released: 2004
- Genre: Hip-hop
- Label: Asfalt Records

O.S.T.R. chronology
Jazz W Wolnych Chwilach (2003)	Jazzurekcja (2004)	Szum Rodzi Hałas (2005)

Jazzurekcja (Polish pronunciation: [ˌd͡ʐɛzuˈrɛkt͡sja], a word play consisting of "Jazz" and "Resurekcja" (resurrection)) is an album by rapper O.S.T.R. It was released in 2004.

== Track listing ==
1. "Dym" (Smoke)
2. "Jazzurekcja" (Jazzurrection)
3. "Odzyskamy Hip-Hop" (We Will Take Hip-Hop Back)
4. "Kilka Wersów Do Ludzi" (A Few Verses for the People)
5. "Dla Zakochanych" (For The Ones, Who Are in Love)
6. "Bajera" (Fib / Sweet Talks)
7. "Apacz" (Apache)
8. "Poszukiwacze Wosku" (Searchers of the Wax)
9. "Państwo" (Country)
10. "Mam Plan" (I've Got a Plan)
11. "Mózg" (Brain)
12. "Małe Piwo" (Small Beer)
13. "Historia" (History)
14. "Nieważne" (Nevermind)
15. "W Nasłuchiwaniu Ciszy" (In Monitoring of Silence)
16. "Komix"
17. "Tajemnica Skreczy" (The Secret of Scratches)
18. "Zoom"
19. "Karambol" (Collision)
20. "Sen" (Dream)
21. "To Jest Nasze" (This is Ours)
22. "Planeta Jazzu" (Jazz Planet)
