= Tabasko =

Studio album by O.S.T.R.
- Released: 2002
- Genre: Hip-hop
- Label: Asfalt Records

O.S.T.R. chronology
| 30 minut z życia (2002) | Tabasko (2002) | Jazz W Wolnych Chwilach (2003) |

Tabasko is an album released by O.S.T.R. in 2002.

== Track listing ==
1. "Masz To Jak W Banku 2" (feat. Nova) (You Have It for Sure 2; lit. You Have It as in a Bank 2)
2. "To Nie Jest Tak" (It's Not Like That)
3. "Kochana Polsko" (Dear Poland)
4. "Szukam Stylu" (feat. Maku) (I'm Searching for a Style)
5. "Zazdrość" (Jealousy)
6. "Zrób Sobie Wolne" (Take a Break)
7. "Tabasko" (Tabasco)
8. "Miejska Ślepota" (Urban Blindness)
9. "Sram Na Media" (feat. Maciej Orłoś, Fenomen & Spinache) (I Shit on the Media)
10. "Grzech Za Grzech" (Sin for a Sin)
11. "$"
12. "Ja I Mój Lolo" (Me and My Joint)
13. "Ból Doświadczeń" (feat. Vienio) (The Pain of Experiences)
14. "Biznes" (Business)
15. "Echo Miasta" (feat. Pezet) (City's Echo)
16. "1 Na 100" (1 of 100)
17. "Ziom Za Ziomem" (feat. Tede) (Homie By Homie)
18. "Rachunek Sumienia" (Examination of conscience)
19. "Tabasko" (Tabasco)
  - "Czas I Pieniądz" (bonus track) (Time and Money)
