= Daily Conversation =

Mixtape by Torae
- Released: January 29, 2008
- Genre: East Coast hip hop
- Length: 53:27
- Label: Internal Affairs Entertainment; Soulspazm Records; Fat Beats Records
- Producer: Torae (exec.); Vega Benetton (co-exec.); DJ Premier; Marco Polo; 9th Wonder; Khrysis; Pavaratti; Black Milk; Mr. Attic; Eric G.

Torae chronology
Daily Conversation (2008)	Double Barrel (2009)

Singles from Daily Conversation
- 1. "Get It Done" Released: May 22, 2007

Daily Conversation is a mixtape by American rapper Torae, released on January 29, 2008, under his own Internal Affairs Entertainment imprint, Soulspazm Records and Fat Beats Records. The mixtape was executive produced by Torae and DJ Vega Benetton. Production was handled by several producers including DJ Premier, 9th Wonder, Black Milk, Khrysis, Marco Polo. Guest appearances include Tash (of Tha Alkaholiks), Sha Stimuli, Chaundon, Skyzoo, and others. The mixtape was preceded by the DJ Premier-produced 12-inch single "Get It Done", with B-side "Click", both featuring Skyzoo.

== Critical reception ==
Professional ratings
Review scores
Source	Rating
HipHopDX	3.5/5 stars
HipHopSite.Com	4/5 stars
RapReviews	7/10

Upon its release, Daily Conversation was met with favorable reviews from music critics. Guido Stern of RapReviews wrote, "While it's probably wise of Torae to keep this as an unofficial first album, it's as impressive a compilation of new music as nearly anyone is releasing in the hip-hop capitol. It may not be heat from start to finish but its lows are not very low at all. If Torae keeps his connections in check and continues to push the bar of his flow and lyrical content, there's no doubt we'll be talking about him again very soon." HipHopDX reviewer J-23 wrote, "Daily Conversation may not be blazing from front to back, but it also has weak spots that aren't really weak - just not quite up to par with the rest. Torae has long shown his gift for rhyming and now proves his ear for beats to be as good and consistent as his bars." D.T. Swinga of HipHopSite.Com wrote, "While Torae has his standout moments on Daily Conversation, at fifteen tracks, there is plenty of room for filler, and it does drag on from time-to-time. If this was his actual 'album', we may have seen a more trim, tightly knit endeavor, but because it's the 'mixtape-album', it's to be expected. While Tor is looked at as a 'beast' by his peers, his appeal lies in his delivery and swagger, rather than lyrical complexity or profound content. Nevertheless, what we have here is an impressive debut, and a sign of great things to come."

== Track listing ==
No.	Title	Producer(s)	Length
1.	"Intro"	Vega Benetton	3:50
2.	"Callin' Me"	Eric G.	3:15
3.	"Somethin' to See"	Khrysis	3:12
4.	"The Journey, Part I"	Pavaratti	3:04
5.	"Click" (featuring Skyzoo)	DJ Premier	3:48
6.	"Fantaztik 4" (featuring Chaundon, Skyzoo, and Kil Ripkin)	9th Wonder	3:39
7.	"Think About It" (featuring Teflon)	Eric G.	2:57
8.	"Switch"	Black Milk	2:45
9.	"Get It Goin'"	Mr. Attic	3:09
10.	"Save the Day" (featuring Sha Stimuli, and Kel Spencer)	Khrysis	3:53
11.	"The Nigguz Is Comin'" (featuring Tash)	Khrysis	3:00
12.	"CME the Entity" (featuring Skyzoo, Yatta Barz, and Zeqway)	Vega Benetton	3:26
13.	"Get It Done" (featuring Skyzoo)	DJ Premier	3:41
14.	"Tayler Made"	Marco Polo	3:26
15.	"Casualty" (+ hidden track)	Marco Polo	6:22
Total length:			53:27
