= Jazz, dwa, trzy =

Studio album by O.S.T.R.
- Released: February 22, 2011 (Poland)
- Recorded: 2010–2011
- Genre: Hip-hop
- Length: 69:28 (CD1), 47:22 (CD2)
- Label: Asfalt Records
- Producer: O.S.T.R.

O.S.T.R. chronology
Tylko dla dorosłych (2010)	Jazz, dwa, trzy (2011)	Haos (2013)

Jazz, dwa, trzy (Polish pronunciation: [ˌjaz dva ˈtʂɨ], English: Jazz, Two, Three (Jazz is pronounced similar to "raz", which means when counting "one")) is an album released by Polish rapper O.S.T.R. on February 22, 2011.

== Track listing ==
CD 1

1. "Introstan" (Intro) - 3:54
2. "Wiecznie drugi" (Always the second one) - 3:35
3. "I co powiedzieć" (And what to say?) - 3:03
4. "Szpiedzy tacy jak my" (Spies just like us) - 3:12
5. "W miłości" (In love) - 5:56
6. "W nienawiści" (In hatred) - 3:52
7. "Jeśli nie masz" (If you don't have) - 5:26
8. "Moje życie" (My life) - 2:46
9. "Na luzie skit" (Chilled skit) - 6:48
10. "Mózg wolność siła" (Brain, freedom, strength) - 3:31
11. "Nie potrzebuję noża" (I don't need a knife) - 3:28
12. "Abstynent" (Abstinent) - 2:07
13. "Boję się zestarzeć" (I'm afraid to get old) - 2:32
14. "Na własne oczy" (With one's own eyes) - 3:06
15. "R.e.l.a.k.s." (R.e.l.a.x.a.t.i.o.n.) - 3:42
16. "ŁDZ skit" - 4:46
17. "Doba" (24 hours) - 3:59
18. "Outrostan" (Outro) - 3:45

CD 2

1. "Utwór 1" - 2:07
2. "Utwór 2" - 2:31
3. "Utwór 3" - 3:10
4. "Utwór 4" - 2:09
5. "Utwór 5" - 2:08
6. "Utwór 6" - 1:58
7. "Utwór 7" - 2:13
8. "Utwór 8" - 2:14
9. "Utwór 9" - 1:57
10. "Utwór 10" - 1:41
11. "Utwór 11" - 2:01
12. "Utwór 12" - 2:26
13. "Utwór 13" - 1:48
14. "Utwór 14" - 2:23
15. "Utwór 15" - 1:58
16. "Utwór 16" - 3:47
17. "Utwór 17" - 2:50
18. "Utwór 18" - 2:17
19. "Utwór 19" - 1:54
20. "Utwór 20" - 3:50

== Charts and certifications ==
=== Charts ===
Chart (2011)	Peak position
Polish Albums (ZPAV)	2

=== Certifications ===
Region	Certification	Certified units/sales
Poland (ZPAV)	Platinum	30,000^{*}
^{*} Sales figures based on certification alone.
