= Port Authority (album) =

Studio album by Marco Polo
- Released: May 15, 2007
- Genre: Hip hop
- Length: 70:57
- Label: Soulspazm; Rawkus Records
- Producer: Marco Polo

Marco Polo chronology
Canned Goods (2005)	Port Authority (2007)	Double Barrel (2009)

Singles from Port Authority
- 1. "War" Released: 2007; 2. "The Radar" Released: 2007

Port Authority is the debut studio album by Canadian hip hop producer Marco Polo. It was released on Soulspazm and Rawkus Records on May 15, 2007. It is the first installment of the Port Authority series, followed by PA2: The Director's Cut in 2013.

== Critical reception ==
Professional ratings
Review scores
Source	Rating
HipHopDX	3.5/5 stars
PopMatters	8/10
RapReviews.com	8/10
Stylus Magazine	B+
URB	4/5 stars
XXL	(XL)

Timmhotep Aku of XXL praised Marco Polo's decision to feature "some of the East Coast's finest vets and samples." Rowald Pruyn of RapReviews.com described him as "a one man band, creating instead of compiling." Jeff Weiss of Stylus Magazine noted that he pays "homage to the latter Golden Age through scratched hooks, graveyard strings, and breakbeats redolent of worn vinyl and dust."

The album was nominated for Rap Recording of the Year at the 2008 Juno Awards.

== Track listing ==
No.	Title	Length
1.	"Port Authority Intro"	1:23
2.	"Get Busy" (featuring Copywrite)	4:24
3.	"Marquee" (featuring O.C.)	4:15
4.	"War" (featuring Kardinal Offishall)	3:56
5.	"Nostalgia" (featuring Masta Ace)	4:50
6.	"Wrong One" (featuring Wordsworth)	3:41
7.	"Low Budget Allstars" (featuring Kev Brown, Kenn Starr, Oddisee, Cy Young, and Kaimbr)	4:09
8.	"Speak Softly" (featuring Jojo Pellegrino)	3:53
9.	"Time & Place" (featuring Ed O.G.)	3:41
10.	"The Radar" (featuring Large Professor)	4:22
11.	"All My Love" (featuring Jaysaun)	3:38
12.	"Lay It Down" (featuring Roc Marciano)	4:46
13.	"Go Around" (featuring Buckshot)	4:26
14.	"Hood Tales" (featuring Kool G Rap and DV Alias Khrist)	4:07
15.	"Heat" (featuring Supastition)	3:25
16.	"Rollin" (featuring Sadat X, Ju-Ju, and A.G.)	4:07
17.	"For the Future" (featuring Critically Acclaimed)	3:47
18.	"Relax" (featuring J Davey)	4:07
Total length:		70:57
