= Double Barrel (album) =

Studio album by Marco Polo & Torae
- Released: June 2, 2009
- Genre: Hip hop
- Length: 48:42
- Label: Duck Down Music Inc.
- Producer: Executive producers: Marco Polo; Torae Carr Co-executive producers; DJ Linx; Shylow; Theo Bark Associate producers; Drew "Dru-Ha" Friedman; Kenyatta "Buckshot" Blake; Music producer Marco Polo

Marco Polo chronology
Port Authority (2007)	Double Barrel (2009)	The Exxecution (2010)

Torae chronology
Daily Conversation (2008)	Double Barrel (2009)	Heart Failure (2011)

Singles from Double Barrel
- 1. "Double Barrel" Released: May 12, 2009

Double Barrel is an album made in collaboration between American rapper Torae and Canadian hip hop producer Marco Polo. The album was released on June 2, 2009 by Duck Down Music Inc. It was preceded by Marco Polo's critically well-received debut album Port Authority (2007), and Torae's inaugural release Daily Conversation (2008) on which Polo has produced three tracks.

The album was executive produced by both artists, along with DJ Linx, Shylow of First Division, and Theo Bark. Associate producers include Duck Down founders Drew "Dru-Ha" Friedman and Kenyatta "Buckshot" Blake. The album features guest appearances from DJ Premier, Lil Fame of M.O.P., Rock of Heltah Skeltah, Guilty Simpson, Masta Ace, Sean Price, S-Roc of BrassMunk, and Saukrates. Scratches are provided by DJ Revolution, DJ Linx, and Shylow. The album was recorded by Marco Polo at The Krib, and was mixed and mastered by Ricardo Gutierrez at Stadium Red in New York City.

The album was preceded by the 12-inch single "Double Barrel" featuring DJ Revolution, with B-side "Hold Up" featuring Masta Ace and Sean Price, and "Combat Drills". The track "Danger" is featured on the soundtrack of the 2013 superhero action comedy film Kick-Ass 2 as well as a backdrop music for the 1st Mission of Call of Duty Modern Warfare 2.

== Critical response ==
Professional ratings
Review scores
Source	Rating
HipHopDX	4/5 stars
KevinNottingham	72/100
The Phoenix	3/4 stars
RapReviews	8/10
The Smoking Section	3/5 stars
Sputnikmusic	3.5/5 stars
XXL	(XL)

Upon its release, the album was met with generally favorable reviews from music critics. Amanda Bassa of HipHopDX wrote, "Low points will be hard to find on Double Barrel, and the project offers up something for those craving the boom bap as well as something that feels relevant in the present." Addi "Mindbender" Stewart of KevinNottingham.com felt that "conceptually and ultimately, not much new ground is broken here. But alternately, and equally importantly, [Marco Polo & Torae] carry on certain hip hop traditions faithfully, yet in their own signature way". The reviewer claimed that the album would "essentially be thought of at as one of the more satisfying offerings of east coast rap music in 2009." Pedro "DJ Complejo" Hernandez, writing for RapReviews.com, remarked that Double Barrel is a "banging album full of unadulterated hip-hop." He believed that "Marco Polo should surely become a hot commodity with his brand of head banging boom bap beats." He also complimented Torae as "a solid emcee" because of his ability to tell stories, his "brash" braggadocio, and his passion which "matches that of the best emcees". Additionally, he mentioned that the Brooklyn rapper can really showcase his talent when he has "the right production behind him". Similarly, Sobhi Youssef of Sputnikmusic wrote, "The production team excels largely in providing an acceptable sonic backdrop for Torae to rhyme over". However, he opined that "without this (or even DJ Revolution's tasteful cuts on a few joints), he is nearly indistinguishable from other hardcore bent tri-state rappers." He then asserted that "this happens with startling (but welcome) frequency as Rocc [sic], Guilty Simpson, Masta Ace, and Sean Price steal the spotlight for their respective featured verses, adding a lot to the track."

In his mixed review for The Smoking Section, TS observed the record's drawback is "the basic business model of things", explaining, "Torae spends the majority of the LP denouncing industry politics while Marco Polo's production tends to blend together with seemingly the same bassline and song tempos by the album's midway point." XXL reviewer Jonathan Bonanno noted that in spite of "lackluster records" such as "Word Play" and "Party Crashers", Double Barrel is in overall "a solid offering" and claimed that "Marco Polo & Torae's potential as a formidable producer/ MC team is without question—even if they never get the mass appeal."

== Track listing ==
No.	Title	Writer(s)	Length
1.	"Intro" (featuring DJ Premier)	M. Bruno; C. Martin	1:17
2.	"Double Barrel" (scratches by DJ Revolution)	M. Bruno; T. Carr	3:24
3.	"Party Crashers"	M. Bruno; T. Carr	3:45
4.	"Smoke" (featuring Lil Fame and Rock)	J. Bush; J. Grinnage; M. Bruno; T. Carr	3:54
5.	"Lifetime" (scratches by DJ Revolution)	M. Bruno; T. Carr	4:15
6.	"But Wait"	M. Bruno; T. Carr	2:43
7.	"Rah Rah Sh*t" (scratches by Shylow)	M. Bruno; T. Carr	4:07
8.	"Danger"	M. Bruno; T. Carr	3:00
9.	"Stomp" (featuring Guilty Simpson)	B. Simpson; M. Bruno; T. Carr	4:02
10.	"Coney Island"	M. Bruno; T. Carr	3:32
11.	"Word Play"	M. Bruno; T. Carr	3:30
12.	"Hold Up" (featuring Masta Ace and Sean Price; scratches by DJ Linx)	D. Clear; M. Bruno; S. Price; T. Carr	3:07
13.	"Get It"	M. Bruno; T. Carr	3:40
Total length:			48:42

Bonus track
No.	Title	Writer(s)	Length
14.	"Crashing Down" (featuring Saukrates and S-Roc)	D. King; K. Wailoo; M. Bruno; T. Carr	4:26

iTunes bonus track
No.	Title	Writer(s)	Length
15.	"Combat Drills"	M. Bruno; T. Carr	2:54

== Credits and personnel ==
Credits for Double Barrel adapted from the album's liner notes.

- Theo Bark – co-executive producer
- Kenyatta "Buckshot" Blake – associate producer
- Marco "Marco Polo" Bruno – composer, engineer, executive producer, primary artist, producer
- Jamal "Rock" Bush – composer, featured artist
- Torae Carr – composer, executive producer, primary artist, rap vocals
- Duval "Masta Ace" Clear – composer, featured artist
- DJ Linx – executive producer, scratching
- DJ Revolution – featured artist, scratching
- Drew "Dru-Ha" Friedman – associate producer
- FWMJ – artwork
- Jamal "Lil Fame" Grinnage – composer, featured artist
- Ricardo Gutierrez – mixing, mastering
- Dwayne S.M. "S-Roc" King – composer, featured artist
- Chris "DJ Premier" Martin – composer, featured artist
- Robert Adam Mayer – photography
- Sean Price – composer, featured artist
- Shylow – co-executive producer, scratching
- Byron "Guilty Simpson" Simpson – composer, featured artist
- Skrilla – artwork [additional]
- Karl Amani "Saukrates" Wailoo – composer, featured artist

== Chart position ==
Chart (2009)	Peak position
US Heatseekers Albums (Billboard)	23
