= Taco Hemingway =

Polish rapper (born 1990)

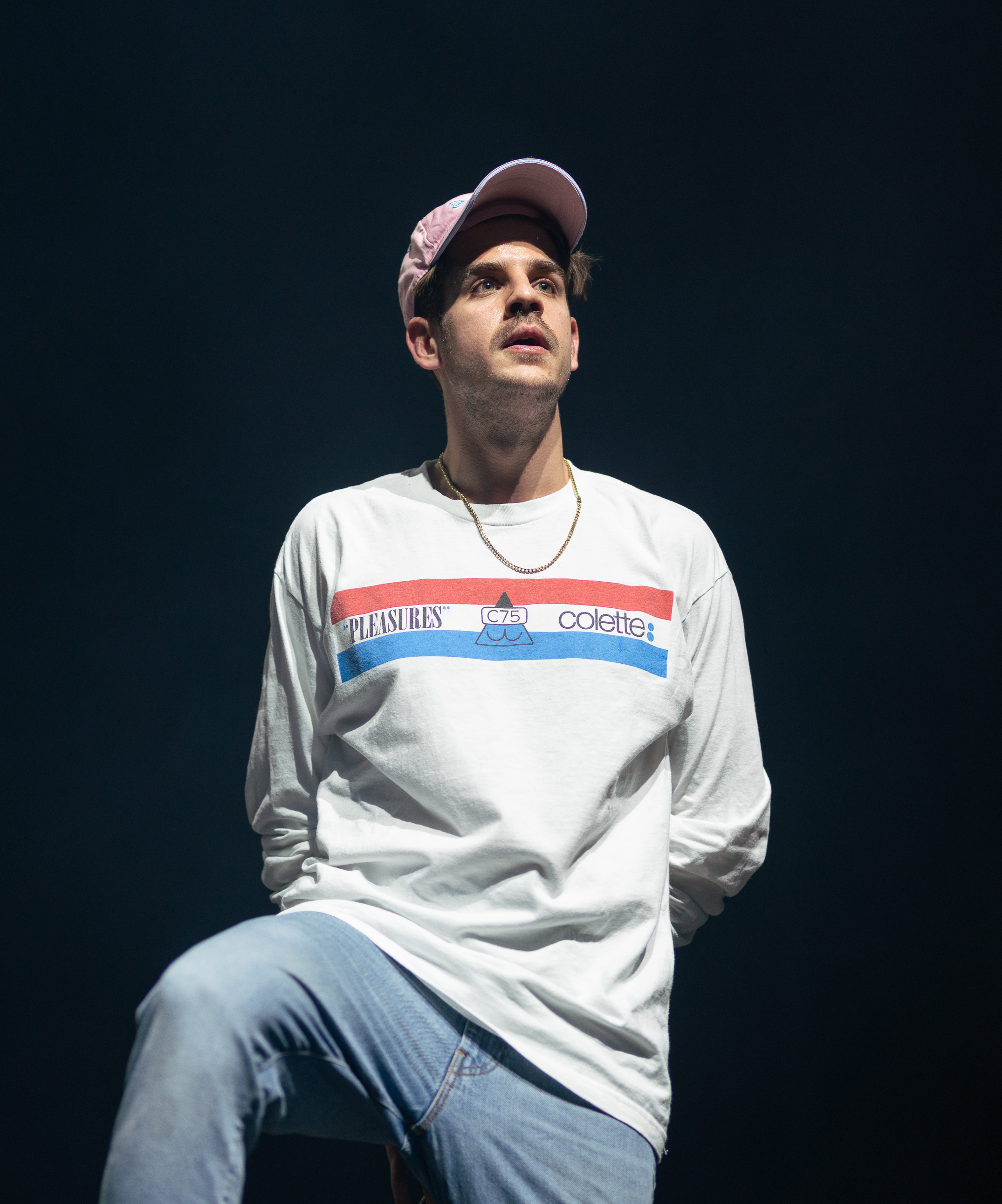
- Hemingway performing in Warsaw in 2018

Background information
- Also known as: Taco, FoodVillain, Fifi, Pan Śmierć
- Born: Filip Tadeusz Szcześniak; 29 July 1990 (age 36); Cairo, Egypt
- Origin: Warsaw, Poland
- Genres: Hip-hop; alternative hip-hop; trap; pop
- Occupations: Rapper; songwriter
- Years active: 2011–present
- Labels: Asfalt; 2020; Taco Corp; Warner Music Poland
- Website: tacohemingway.com

Filip Tadeusz Szcześniak (born 29 July 1990), better known by the stage name Taco Hemingway (earlier FV), is a Polish rapper. He began recording in 2011, at which time he released - under the pseudonym Foodvillain - an English-language mixtape entitled Who Killed JFK. A year later, he adopted the pseudonym Taco Hemingway, under which he released the English-language EP Young Hems. In 2014, he released a second EP, this time recorded in Polish, titled Trójkąt warszawski. The album brought the musician publicity, thanks to which he joined the label Asfalt Records, under which he released a re-release of Trójkąt warszawski and a new EP entitled Umowa o dzieło. These, as well as subsequent albums released on the label, made the rapper famous, and he quickly became one of the most popular musicians in Poland.

He has sold over 400,000 albums in Poland, making him one of the best-selling rappers in Poland. Almost all of the rapper's album can be downloaded for free from his website. The most successful was the joint album with Quebonafide, titled Soma 0.5 mg, which was sold in over 150 thousand copies. Also successful were the albums Szprycer, Marmur and Pocztówka z WWA, lato '19. For the sale of albums he repeatedly received the certificate of platinum, gold and diamond records. He created hits such as "6 zer", "Następna stacja", "Deszcz na betonie", "Polskie Tango", "Tamagotchi" or "Nostalgia", which all went trending on YouTube with millions of views shortly after release.

He has been nominated for the Fryderyk Awards thirteen times between 2016 and 2020, including four times as a winner in the hip-hop Album of the Year category (for the albums Umowa o dzieło, Szprycer, Soma 0,5 mg, Pocztówka z WWA), including being the only artist to win the award three times in a row and being the only rapper nominated and awarded in the Song of the Year category. He was also nominated for the MTV Europe Music Awards in the Best Polish Artist category and Empik's Bestsellers in the Polish Music, Hip-Hop Music and Streaming categories. However, the musician does not pay much attention to the awards, and he did not collect any of them.

He was ranked 10th on the list of Most Influential Poles 2019 by Wprost. He is the first Polish artist whose songs have been played over a billion times on the streaming platform Spotify. Despite his immense popularity, the rapper does not spend much time in the media, rarely giving interviews and not appearing in advertisements.

== Early life ==
Filip Szcześniak was born in Cairo, Egypt, in 1990. At the age of 2, he moved with his parents from Egypt to Guangzhou, China. Initially, he attended an English preschool before transferring to a Chinese preschool, where he experienced communication problems due to differences in culture and language. Upon finishing preschool, Szcześniak and his family moved to Warsaw in 1996, where he experienced little to no difficulties in school while simultaneously developing his bilingualism from his early years. In an interview with Metro Warszawa, Szcześniak stated that he spoke English with his mother and sister and that he spoke in Polish with his father. He listened to various rap artists with his father, developing his passion for the rap genre. His parents divorced in 2004.

Szcześniak completed his studies at Prywatne Gimnazjum nr 1 and Copernicus Bilingual High School in Warsaw, where he met his future producer, Maciej Ruszecki. He is also a graduate of cultural studies at the University of Warsaw. In 2012, he began studying for a master's degree in anthropology in University College London.

== Career ==
=== 2011–2016: Young Hems, Trójkąt warszawski and Umowa o dzieło ===
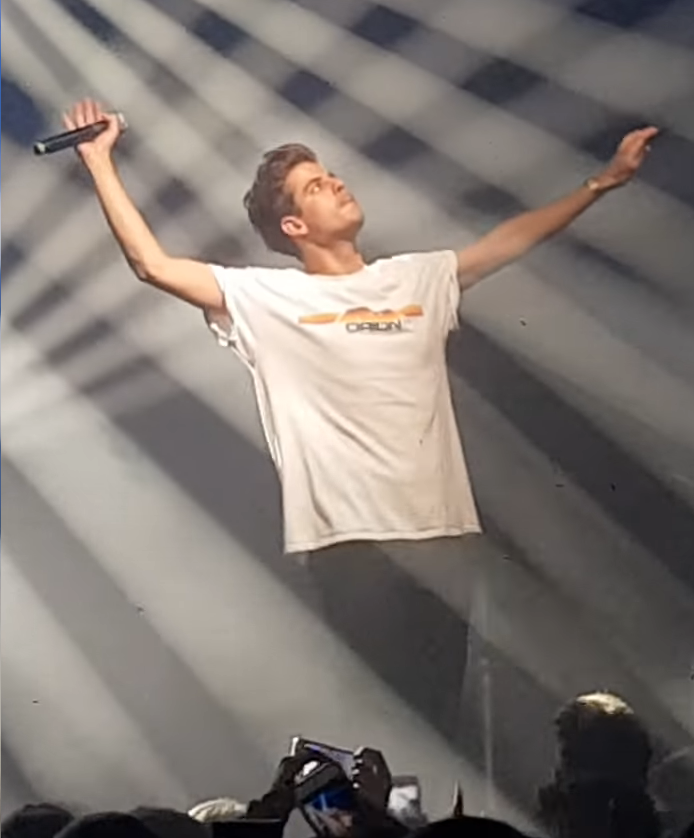
Taco Hemingway performing during his 2017 tour.

While studying in London, he wrote lyrics for his mixtape entitled Who Killed JFK. He began posting his first songs on YouTube, using the alias Foodvillain at the time. The rapper unsuccessfully tried to pursue music making as well. He rapped in English on illegally downloaded MF Doom beats in his friend's basement. In his lyrics he referred to the work of rappers such as Childish Gambino or Jay-Z. The project itself did not meet with much publicity. On 26 December 2013, he released his English-language EP titled Young Hems via Bandcamp. The artist adopted the pseudonym Taco Hemingway, which was taken from the football game FIFA, in which he played under such a pseudonym. The material was recorded in Brussels in the basement of his mother's house at the time. The album again did not receive much publicity. The rapper was initially employed in the advertising industry, but abandoned it in favor of becoming an English translator, and in the meantime he was writing his second EP. On 19 December 2014, his second re-released EP, titled Trójkąt warszawski, was released. The album was made available as a free digital stream on his YouTube channel and as a free download on the rapper's official website. A day after the premiere of the album, the artist played his first concert in Cafe Kulturalna in Warsaw. Radio premiere of tracks from Trójkąt warszawski took place in December on Saturday programme Tony z betonu in radio Trójka, for which the artist also gave an interview. In January he published on his channel the track "Tunarzywo" which was recorded in 2013. On 27 March 2015 he played a concert at Klubokawiarnia Chłodna 25, which was the "official" premiere of the album. In April 2015 he gave an interview for the Polish Radio Koszalin in the program Rapnejszyn. The same year he was scheduled to perform in the promotional action of the PopKiller portal entitled "Young Wolves 2015", however he declined due to lack of time. On 6 June 2015, there was a digital premiere of the first single titled "6 zeros" along with a music video, directed by Łukasz Partyka and Jonasz Tołopiła. The single proved to be the rapper's first major commercial success and key to his popularity in Poland. On 27 June 2015, the musician's third EP, titled Umowa o dzieło, was released. The material was made available free of charge in digital forms: on the YouTube channel and via the rapper's official website.

At first Taco sent his records to Prosto and Alkopoligamia, but due to lack of response he sent them to Marcin "Tytus" Grabski - owner of Asfalt Records. There the recordings met with the publisher's interest which eventually resulted in signing a publishing contract.

On 19 August 2015, reissues of the albums Trójkąt warszawski and Umowa o dzieło went on sale, which gained huge publicity, reaching respectively the 3rd and 2nd place of the Polish charts - OLiS, both selling more than 10 thousand copies on the day of their release. The albums were excellently received by listeners and earned the same positive reviews from critics. The album Umowa o dzieło achieved gold album status by 2017. In turn, the song "Następna stacja", coming from the album Umowa o dzieło, reached the 1st place of the Polish Radio's Lista Przebojów Programu Trzeciego list and stayed there for several weeks. That same year he went on his first concert tour of Poland, called the Następna Stacja Tour. In the same year, he performed for the first time at Open'er Festival, on a side stage. In 2016, he became the winner of the most important Polish music award, the Fryderyk, for the album Umowa o dzieło in the category Album of the Year Hip-Hop. On 5 July 2016, he released the single "Deszcz na betonie", which announced the album Marmur. The single proved to be a hit on many radio stations, achieving chart success, including reaching No. 1 on UWM FM radio and RDC radio. It also hit the charts of Polish Radio III, Radio Poznań and Radio Szczecin.

=== 2016–2018: Wosk, Marmur and Szprycer ===
In February 2016, he started writing lyrics for his first studio album. In 2016, the rapper's fourth mini-album titled Wosk was released unannounced for free download on the rapper's website. The album was well received by music critics; however, reviewers pointed out that the lyrics were less brilliant than before and that the rapper could be boring sometimes. The song "Wiatr", became the biggest hit of the album, reaching almost 10 million views on YouTube.

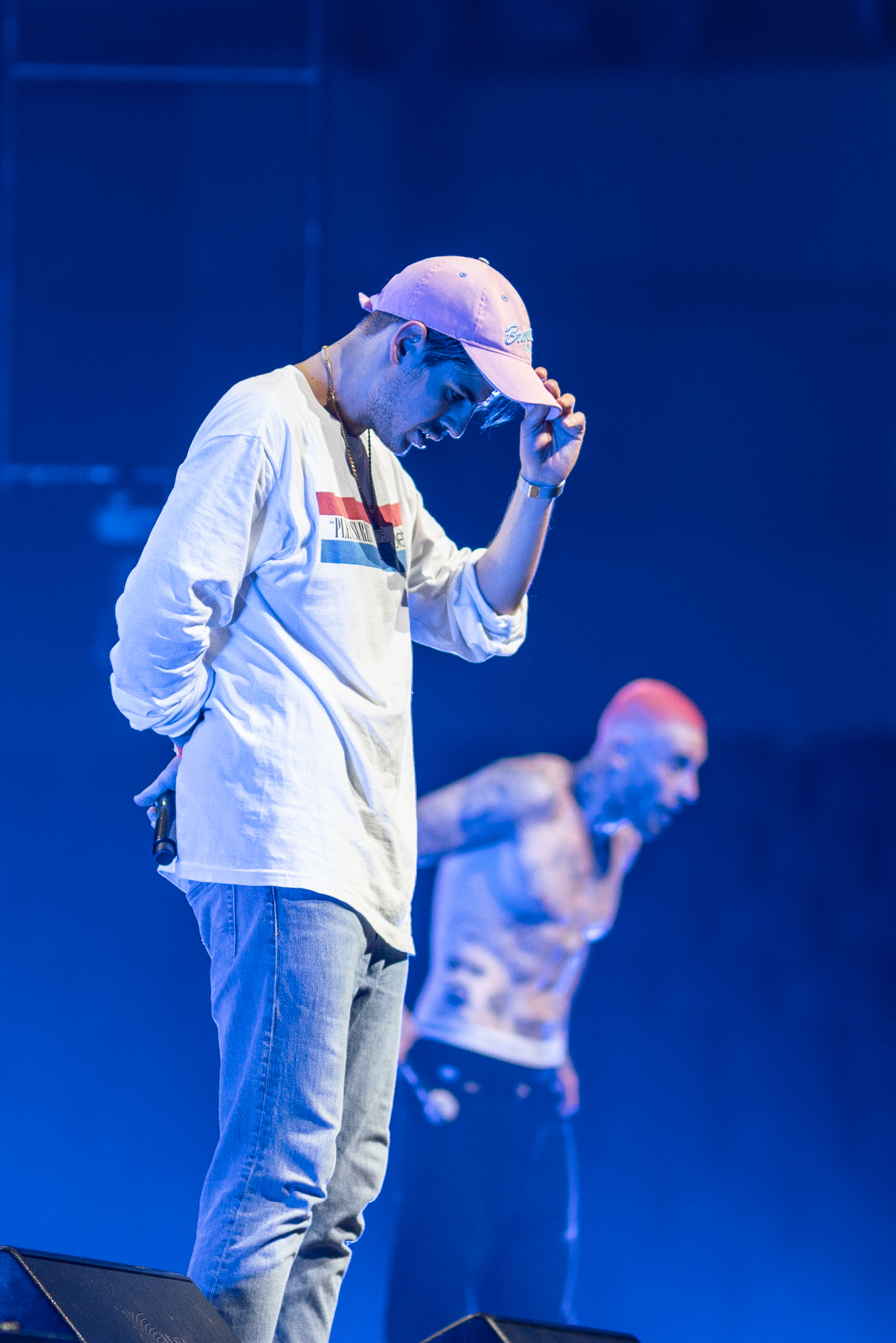
Taco Hemingway with Quebonafide during Ekodiesel Tour in 2018.

On 2 November, he released his first studio album, entitled Marmur, which went on sale on 2 December along with the rapper's previous album, Wosk. The albums debuted at number 3 and number 14 on the Polish music charts, OLiS, respectively. The albums received positive, although slightly weaker than the previous albums, reviews from critics. By February 2017, more than 15,000 copies of the album Marmur had been sold, which achieved gold album status. A song from that album, titled "Święcące prostokąty" reached number 23 on the Polish Radio's Lista Przebojów Programu Trzeciego list. That same year, the rapper went on his second concert tour, Marmur Tour. Rapper Sokół in an interview with Gazeta.pl praised Taco Hemingway, stating that he appreciates his work. In 2017, he was once again nominated for the Fryderyk Award for his album Marmur, in the Hip-Hop Album of the Year category, but lost to the album Życie po śmierci by rapper O.S.T.R. In 2017, the rapper performed at the Open'er Festival for the second time, this time on the main stage, where on the last song "Następna stacja", due to the producer's equipment being flooded by rain, the artist had to finish the song a cappella.

In July 2017, he announced a new EP. On 30 July 2017, he released a single titled "Nostalgia" along with a music video. The same day the full minialbum titled Szprycer was released digitally. The physical version was released on 25 August. The album debuted at number 1 on the Polish charts - OLiS. The rapper changed his style on the album, which made it poorly received by the community and critics. With the song "Nostalgia", the rapper once again hit the radio charts. The album, like any previous one, was made available for free download on the rapper's website. After the release of the album, the rapper embarked on his 2017 Tour, during which he played concerts in 13 cities selling a total of over 23,000 tickets. The tour culminated with a performance in Warsaw's Torwar, where the rapper filled the entire hall with more than 6 thousand people. In the same period, he also recorded a song with Otsochodzi titled "Nowy Kolor" along with a music video. The song became a hit, the video within a few months of its release was watched by over 25 million people on YouTube. The song also became the 2017 single of the year according to sites like Glamrap, Newonce, and Interia. The song also reached No. 4 on the Radio Poznań charts. Finally, it was nominated for the 2019 Fryderyki Award in the category of Hit of the Year and covered with diamond album status. In October, the rapper released a limited number of T-shirts, sweatshirts and caps modeled after the themes of his albums. On 6 March 2018, Szprycer album was nominated for the Fryderyk Award in the hip-hop Album of the Year category and won the poll. The rapper once again did not attend the awards gala. Also by March 2018, the album had sold over 30,000 copies, earning platinum status.

=== 2018–2019: Taconafide, Café Belga and Flagey ===
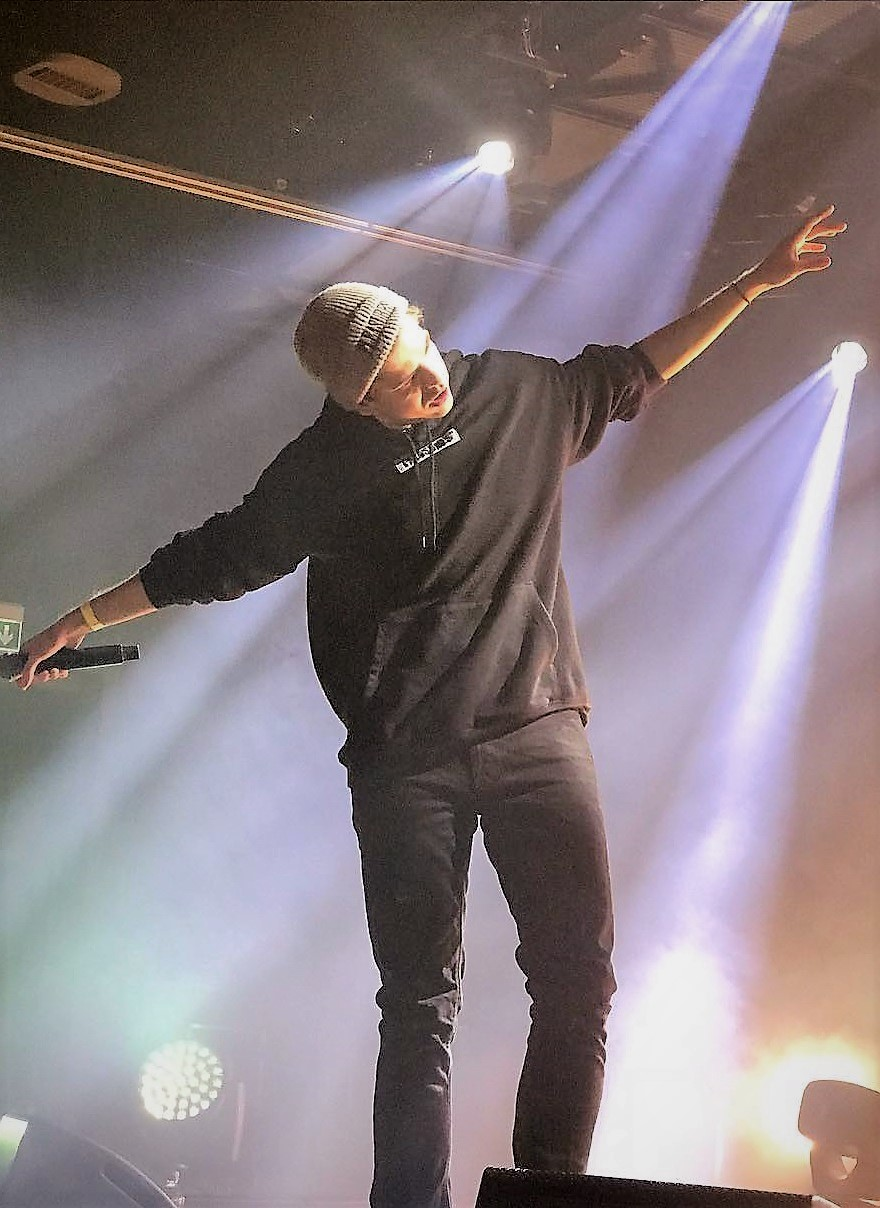
Rapper during Café Belga Tour, 2018

In March 2018, he announced that he would record a joint album with Quebonafide. On 16 March 2018, Taconafide released the duo's first single titled "Art-B" on the QueQuality label's channel. Along with the release, the album's preorder was launched. The rappers announced a joint nationwide tour to promote the album titled Ekodiesel Tour. In two weeks, the artists sold out the tickets for the concert in Torwar and quickly sold out the rest of the concerts in major halls in Poland. It is the biggest commercial success concerning concerts in the history of Polish rap.

On 22 March 2018, they released their second single titled "Tamagotchi" along with a music video. The song proved to be a great commercial success reaching the 22nd place of the best-selling singles list in Poland - AirPlay. The song broke Ed Sheeran's record for the most listened to single on Spotify in Poland. The song itself held the #1 spot for a week on the YouTube timecard reaching over 10 million views in ten days, eventually reaching over 90 million views. The song also turned out to be a huge radio hit, reaching the top of the charts in many radio stations, including Radio Eska, Radio Szczecin, Radio Trójka and RMF FM. A day later, on March 23, producer Supremé on his Instagram announced a track titled "Girø", which will appear on the album. On March 27, limited edition extras and puzzling graphics announcing guest appearances on the album were revealed. On 1 April 2018, Taconafide's Instagram account revealed the entire tracklist of the album, titled Soma 0.5 mg, as well as bonus material called 0.25 mg. The producers and guests on the bonus CD were also revealed, which turned out to be: Bedoes, Kękę, Paluch, Kaz Bałagane, Dawid Podsiadło and Białas. The single "Tamagotchi" also set a record on Spotify as the most listened to song in a week, reaching 1,797,617 listens (previously the record belonged to Ed Sheeran with 767,383 plays). On 4 April 2018, another single titled "Metallica 808" was released on Taco's channel. On 9 April 2018, a fourth single titled "Kryptowaluty premiered on the QueQuality label channel. 13 April 2018 saw the premiere of the entire Soma 0.5 mg album, which was released in its entirety on Taco and QueQuality's YouTube channels and streaming services. A few days after the premiere, additional material added to the album was also made available on streaming services. The entire album hit the first Top 15 on Spotify. The album received mixed reviews from critics, with most accusing the project of being geared towards commercial success. The album debuted at number 1 on the Polish charts - OLiS, selling over 30 thousand copies, thus gaining the status of a platinum album. The album was also the best-selling album in Poland in April and May in 2018. On 4 July 2018, the album was awarded double platinum status for selling 60,000 copies. The album was also the best-selling album of the first half of the year in Poland. On July 6, the rapper made his third appearance at the Open'er Festival in Gdynia this time with rapper Quebonafide as Taconafide. The musicians had previously announced that it would be their last concert as a duo. According to media reports, the rappers gathered an audience of a few dozen thousand people, comparable to that of the biggest stars of the evening, Gorillaz, and at the same time the biggest among Polish performers in Open'er history.

In a zine added to the pre-order, the rapper announced that he will release two more solo projects this year. As of mid-2018, the rapper has partially moved back to London to his girlfriend. The first, his second studio album titled Café Belga, was released unannounced on 13 July 2018. The second is an EP added to the album, titled Flagey. The musician once again debuted with the album on the 1st place of the Polish charts - OLiS. The album received the status of a gold record two weeks after its premiere. The album received varied reviews, mostly positive, critics praised that the album is better in comparison to the artist's previous works, that is, Szprycer and Soma 0.5 mg. Coming from the album Café Belga, the song "Fiji" hit the radio charts of RMF Maxxx and Eska and reached the 26th place of the best-selling singles list in Poland - AirPlay. At the end of 2018, the rapper embarked on his next tour entitled Cafe Belga Tour visiting the biggest cities in Poland. Along with the tour, he launched a limited edition clothing collection available on his store page, label Asfalt Records. In October 2018, the rapper was nominated for the MTV Europe Music Awards in the Best Polish Performer category as Taconafide. Also in October of the same year, the album Soma 0.5 mg sold over 90,000 copies earning triple platinum status. Also, the album Café Belga by the end of October had distributed more than 30 thousand copies thus earning platinum status. According to the media, by the end of 2018, the album Soma 0.5 mg had sold about 100,000 copies of records and in 2019, it was awarded diamond status for selling more than 150,000 copies. In 2019, the rapper received as many as seven nominations for the Fryderyk Awards, including the album Soma 0.5 mg, which won in the hip-hop album of the year category.

=== 2019–2020: Pocztówka z WWA, lato '19, Jarmark and Europa ===
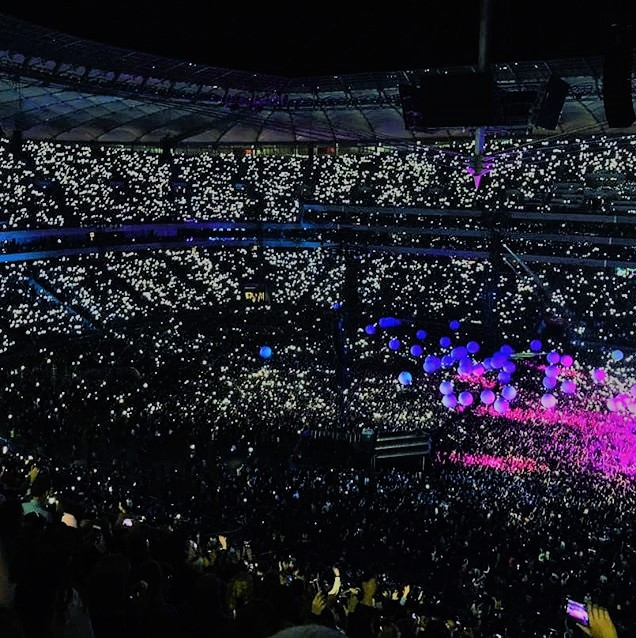
Taco Hemingway with Dawid Podsiadło during a concert on National Stadium in Warsaw, 2019.

Although in the song "Café Belga" he announced a possible break from music in 2019, on 7 February, a photo was released online in which the rapper could be seen during a recording session in the studio. On 9 February 2019, a snippet of the musician's new song leaked onto the internet, which the label Asfalt Records tried unsuccessfully to remove. On 12 February of the same year, he appeared as a guest on Bedoes' single "Chłopaki nie płaczą", and the daily Newonce included his verse in the ranking of "5 songs that pushed the boundaries of what is allowed and what is not in Polish rap". In April of the same year, on the Instagram profile of the recording studio in which the rapper works, a post appeared that confirmed the formation of a new album. In May 2019, the artist together with Dawid Podsiadło announced a concert at the National Stadium in Warsaw. Taco also added that this is his only concert this year. The event gained a lot of publicity and already in almost 3 hours the artists sold out all the tickets, that is 73 thousand seats filling the whole stadium. Thus, the musicians beat the Polish record and sold more tickets than Metallica or Coldplay.

On 16 July 2019, the rapper announced the release of his new album titled Pocztówka z WWA, lato '19 on 9 August and pre-orders for the album have begun. The musician wrote on Instagram that despite the announced hiatus, he couldn't help himself and will release the new album in the summer, as he does every year. For the first time on the album, the rapper invited guests, other musicians such as Pezet, Dawid Podsiadło, schafter, Kizo, Ras and Rosalie appeared. On 23 July 2019, around 10 p.m., the album was unexpectedly released electronically on YouTube and streaming services such as Spotify among others, as always the rapper made the entire album available for free MP3 download on his website. The rapper debuted at number one on the Polish sales list - OLiS for the fourth time in a row and held the top spot for three weeks. The album sold 15,000 copies in pre-sales and was certified gold by ZPAV on 21 August 2019. The album received generally good reviews from critics. Songs from the album titled "W piątki leżę w wannie" and "Sanatorium" hit the charts in Polish radio stations. On 15 August, the artist made a guest appearance in Kizo's single "Niebieski Bentley". The rapper also made a guest appearance on Pezet's album, Muzyka Współczesna in the song "2K30". On 30 October 2019, the album achieved platinum status for selling over 30,000 copies. In October, the rapper appeared on the 10th place of Most Influential Poles 2019 according to the Wprost. On 6 November 2019, the artist made a guest appearance on schafter's single titled "Bigos" for which a music video was also released. The song reached number 1 in the timecard on YouTube and Spotify platforms. Also in November, he appeared as a guest star in two songs on Bedoes' album, entitled "Opowieści z doliny smoków".

At the beginning of 2020, he embarked on his sixth tour entitled Pocztówka z Polski Tour. Due to the COVID-19 outbreak, the tour was postponed to a later date. The album Pocztówka z WWA received nominations for many awards including the 2020 Fryderyk Awards and Empik Bestsellers 2019 and was the tenth highest selling album in Poland. During the COVID-19 pandemic, he took part in the #hot16challenge campaign to promote fundraising for medical personnel. He himself donated PLN 100,000 to the cause. In his stanza, he announced that he might be releasing a few albums in July. On 25 June 2020, a photo of the rapper from the studio Nagrywarka surfaced, announcing that a new album was in the making. On 3 July, he made a guest appearance in Artur Rojek's single "A miało być jak we śnie", to which a video was made. In July 2020, the rapper together with the group PRO8L3M founded a music publishing company called 2020. On 10 July 2020, the day before the election silence, a single entitled "Polskie Tango" was released, which depicts the Polish mentality, expresses concern about the state of the country and refers to the political situation in Poland, criticizing it. The single is a preview of the album titled Jarmark, announced for summer 2020. The single broke the daily playback record in Poland on Spotify, which previously also belonged to his song "W piątki leżę wannie", gaining over 560 thousand plays. On YouTube, he garnered over 2.5 million views in 24 hours of publication also breaking the record. On July 28, the rapper announced via Instagram that the release of the albums has been postponed from July to late August/early September. On 29 July 2020, the single "Michael Essien Birthday Party" came out on the rapper's birthday, announcing a new album titled Europa, which along with Jarmark will come out on 4 September 2020. Pre-orders for the albums also started on the same day. On 28 August 2020, the rapper again unexpectedly released the album titled Jarmark, making it available on streaming services and for free download on his website. On 4 September 2020, the album Europa went on sale in a physical version, along with the album Jarmark, in stores nationwide and was made available on streaming services and for free download on his website. The artist debuted at number one on the OLiS chart for the fifth consecutive year with the album Jarmark, with the album Europa coming in second. Together with the albums, there were as many as seven albums of the artist on the list, which made the rapper equal to Czesław Niemen's record for the number of albums in one OLiS listing. The albums gained gold status on 24 September 2020. The album received mixed reviews, critics accused the rapper that from the heavy topics he touched upon on the album Jarmark, such as national politics or the Church in Poland, the artist too often throws truisms and banalities, having nothing interesting to say. In turn, some critics praised the rapper for finally having someone from the popular music world trying to address such topics and teach the youth. The album Europa received average reviews, critics claimed that the album is uneven, sometimes interesting, and then it becomes shallow in places. In the same year, he received two nominations to the Fryderyk Awards 2021, for the album Jarmark in the category Album of the Year hip-hop and for "Polskie Tango" in the category Song of The Year. In 2020, he gave an interview with PRO8L3M for the website Newonce, where he stated that he now wants to mainly focus on publishing and helping new young artists in his new label.

== Personal life ==
He is in a relationship with Iga Lis, daughter of Polish journalist Tomasz Lis. In a 2016 interview for Sport.pl he stated that he is a fan of the football team Tottenham Hotspur. He identifies as an atheist.

== Discography ==
=== Studio albums ===
Title	Album details	Peak chart positions	Sales	Certifications
Title	Album details	POL	Sales	Certifications
Marmur	Released: 3 November 2016; Label: Taco Corp, Asfalt Records; Format: CD, LP, digital download	3	POL: 30,000+	ZPAV: Platinum
Soma 0,5 mg (with Quebonafide as Taconafide)	Released: 13 April 2018; Label: Taconafidex; Format: CD, LP, digital download	1	POL: 150,000+	ZPAV: Diamond
Café Belga	Released: 13 July 2018; Label: Taco Corp, Asfalt Records; Format: CD, LP, digital download	1	POL: 30,000+	ZPAV: Platinum
Pocztówka z WWA, lato '19	Released: 23 July 2019; Label: Taco Corp, Asfalt Records; Format: CD, LP, digital download	1	POL: 150,000+	ZPAV: Diamond
Jarmark	Released: 4 September 2020; Label: Taco Corp, 2020; Format: CD, LP digital download	1	POL: 60,000+	ZPAV:2× Platinum
Europa	Released: 4 September 2020; Label: Taco Corp, 2020; Format: CD, LP, digital download	2	POL: 60,000+	ZPAV: 2x Platinum
1-800-Oświecenie	Released: 22 September 2023; Label: 2020; Format: CD, LP, digital download	1	POL: 90,000+	ZPAV: 3× Platinum
LATARNIE WSZĘDZIE DAWNO ZGASŁY	Released: 19 December 2025; Label: 2020; Format: CD, digital download, cassette	1		
"—" denotes a title that did not chart.

=== Extended plays ===
Title	Album details	Peak chart positions	Sales	Certifications
Title	Album details	POL	Sales	Certifications
Young Hems	Released: 26 December 2013; Label: Taco Corp, Asfalt Records; Format: CD	—		
Trójkąt Warszawski	Released: 19 December 2014; Label: Taco Corp, Asfalt Records; Format: CD, LP, digital download	3	POL: 15,000+	ZPAV: Gold
Umowa o Dzieło	Released: 27 June 2015; Label: Taco Corp, Asfalt Records; Format: CD, LP, digital download	2	POL: 30,000+	ZPAV: Gold
Wosk	Released: 26 July 2016; Label: Taco Corp, Asfalt Records; Format: CD, LP, digital download	14	POL: 15,000+	
Szprycer	Released: 30 July 2017; Label: Taco Corp, Asfalt Records; Format: CD, LP, digital download	1	POL: 30,000+	ZPAV: Platinum
Flagey	Released: 13 July 2018; Label: Taco Corp, Asfalt Records; Format: CD, LP	—		
"—" denotes a title that did not chart.

=== Singles ===
Title	Year	Peak chart positions	Album
Title	Year	POL	Album
"6 zer"	2015	—	Umowa o Dzieło
"Deszcz na betonie"	2016	—	Marmur
"Nostalgia"	2017	—	Szprycer
"Art-B" (with Quebonafide as Taconafide)	2018	—	Soma 0,5 mg
"Tamagotchi" (with Quebonafide as Taconafide)	2018	22	Soma 0,5 mg
"Metallica 808" (with Quebonafide as Taconafide)	2018	—	Soma 0,5 mg
"Kryptowaluty" (with Quebonafide as Taconafide)	2018	—	Soma 0,5 mg
"Polskie tango"	2020	—	Jarmark
"Michael Essien Birthday Party"	2020	—	Europa
"—" denotes a title that did not chart.

=== Other charted songs ===
Title	Year	Peak chart positions	Album
Title	Year	POL	Album
"Fiji"	2018	26	Café Belga
"W piątki leże w wannie" (with Dawid Podsiadło)	2019	63	Pocztówka z WWA, lato '19
"ZAKOCHAŁEM SIĘ POD APTEKĄ"	2025	42	LATARNIE WSZĘDZIE DAWNO ZGASŁY

=== Guest appearances ===
Title	Year	Other artist(s)	Album
"Postaranie"	2015	Małe Miasta	Koń
"Lek Przeciwbólowy"	2015	Rasmentalism, Sokół	Prosto Mixtape IV
"SumieNIE"	2017	Otsochodzi, Holak, O.S.T.R.	Nowy Kolor
"Nowy Kolor"	2017	Otsochodzi	Nowy Kolor
"Fast Food"	2018	Rasmentalism, Rosalie	Tango
"Chłopaki nie płaczą"	2018	Bedoes	Kwiat Polskiej Młodzieży
"Napad na bankiet"	2019	Sokół, PRO8L3M	Wojtek Sokół
"Haute Couture"	2020	TUZZA Globale	Giardino
"TOKYO2020"	2020	Quebonafide	Romantic Psycho
"Patrol"	2021	CatchUp, Kacperczyk	Perypetie
"Kurtz"	2021	Mata	Młody Matczak
"ADHD"	2022	Oki	PRODUKT47
"Dresscode"	2022	White 2115, Bedoes	Rodzinny biznes
"SUPRO"	2023	Daria Zawiałow	Dziewczyna pop
"'Tak to leciało!'"	2024	Otsochodzi	TTHE GRIND

== Tours ==
- Następna stacja Tour (2015)
- Marmur Tour (2016)
- 2017 Tour (2017)
- Ekodiesel Tour (as Taconafide) (2018)
- Café Belga Tour (2018)
- Pocztówka z Polski Tour (2020)
- ~~2020/2021/~~2022 Tour (2022)
- 1-800-TOUR (2024)
- 2026 Tour (2026)
