= HollyŁódź =

Studio album by O.S.T.R.
- Released: February 2007
- Genre: Hip-hop
- Label: Asfalt Records
- Producer: O.S.T.R.

O.S.T.R. chronology
7 (2006)	HollyŁódź (2007)	Ja tu tylko sprzątam (2008)

HollyŁódź (Polish pronunciation: [ˌxɔliˈwut͡ɕ], word-play consisting of Hollywood and Łódź, O.S.T.R.'s native city) is an album released by polish rapper O.S.T.R. in 2007.

== Track listing ==
1. "Intro"
2. "Brzydki, zły i szczery" (Ugly, Bad and Sincere)
3. "Brother on the Run" (feat. Craig G)
4. "Daj mi pracę" (Give me some Work)
5. "Do tego bitu" (To this Beat)
6. "Historia stylu" (Style History)
7. "Cokolwiek ziom" (Whatever, Dude/Homie)
8. "Czarna miłość" (feat. Dirty Diggers) (Black Love)
9. "Szkoła latania" (Flying School)
10. "Czysty biznes" (Pure Business)
11. "LWC" (feat. LWC - O.S.T.R. & Afront)
12. "Afery kosztem nas" (Affairs at our cost)
13. "Reprezentuj" (feat. Zeus & Kochan) (Represent)
14. "Chciwość" (Greed)
15. "15 Metrów Kwadratowych" (15 Square Meters)
16. "Haem bracie to zabija" (Haem Brother this Kills)
17. "Ostatni taki sort" (The Last Sort of its Kind)
18. "Powrót do przeszłości" (A Return to the Past)
19. "Po co?" (feat. Dan Fresh (Skill Mega) & Modry (Koncept)) (What For?)
20. "Brat, nikt mi tego nie zabroni..." (Brother, No one can forbid me from doing this)
21. "Chwila na refleksje" (A Moment to Reflect)
22. "Dzięki" (Thanks)
