= Ja tu tylko sprzątam =

Studio album by O.S.T.R.
- Released: February 22, 2008 (Poland)
- Recorded: 2007–2008
- Genre: Hip-hop
- Length: 76:20
- Label: Asfalt Records
- Producer: O.S.T.R.

O.S.T.R. chronology
HollyŁódź (2007)	Ja tu tylko sprzątam (2008)	O.c.b. (2009)

Ja tu tylko sprzątam (Polish pronunciation: [ˌja tu ˌtɨlkɔ ˈspʂɔ̃ntam], English: I just do the cleaning here) is an album released by Polish rapper O.S.T.R. on February 22, 2008.

== Track listing ==
№	Title	Time	Title translation	Performer(s)
1	"Introgliceryna"	5:40	"Introglicerin"	O.S.T.R.
2	"Zamach Na Ostrego"	5:57	"Assassinating O.S.T.R."	O.S.T.R.
3	"Rap Droższy Od Pieniędzy"	2:29	"Rap More Expensive Than Money"	O.S.T.R.
4	"Co By Się Nie Działo"	3:22	"Whatever Would Happen"	O.S.T.R.
5	"śśśśśś"	3:21	"shhhhh"	O.S.T.R.
6	"Dla Tych Kilku Rzeczy"	4:05	"For These Few Things"	O.S.T.R.
7	"Jak Nie Ty, To Kto?"	3:33	"If Not You, Then Who?"	O.S.T.R. Brother J
8	"Wojna o tlen"	3:27	"War Over Oxygen"	O.S.T.R.
9	"Ty Sobie Możesz"	3:33		O.S.T.R.
10	"Keep It Classy"	4:00	—	O.S.T.R. Sadat X Cadillac Dale
11	"1980"	3:58	—	O.S.T.R.
12	"To Ja Mam Flow"	2:41	"I Have the Flow"	O.S.T.R.
13	"Krótki Kawałek O Wolności Słowa"	2:24	"A Short Track About Freedom of Speech"	O.S.T.R.
14	"Jestem Tylko Dzieckiem"	3:31	"I'm Just a Kid"	O.S.T.R. Dan Fresh; El Da Sensei
15	"Pij Mleko"	3:41	"Drink Milk"	O.S.T.R.
16	"Przeżyć To Jeszcze Raz"	2:53	"To Live Through It Again"	O.S.T.R.
17	"Mówiłaś Mi..."	3:30	"You Told Me..."	O.S.T.R.
18	"To Mamy W Myśli"	3:31	"This is What We Have in Mind"	O.S.T.R.
19	"Big Money On The Table"	4:16	—	O.S.T.R. Reps; Cadillac Dale
20	"Wszystko Co Na Górze"	3:14	"Everything That's on the Top"	O.S.T.R.
21	"Ja Tu Tylko Sprzątam"	3:13	"I Just Do the Cleaning Here"	O.S.T.R.
22	"Jestem Tylko Dzieckiem (Returners Remix)" (Bonus Track)	3:01	"I'm Just a Kid"	O.S.T.R. El Da Sensei

== Singles ==
- "1980" (2008)
- "Jak nie Ty, to Kto?" (2008)

== Chart positions ==
Chart (2008)	Peak position
Official Retail Sales Chart, Poland	1
