= PA2: The Director's Cut =

Studio album by Marco Polo
- Released: November 12, 2013
- Genre: Hip hop
- Length: 79:16
- Label: Soulspazm
- Producer: Marco Polo

Marco Polo chronology
| Newport Authority 2 (2013) | PA2: The Director's Cut (2013) | Kartagina (2014) |

Singles from PA2: The Director's Cut
- 1. "3-O-Clock" Released: September 17, 2013

PA2: The Director's Cut is the second solo studio album by Canadian hip hop producer Marco Polo, released on November 12, 2013, via Soulspazm Records. The first installment of the Port Authority series was released in 2007 under Soulspazm and Rawkus. In May 2013, the second installment of the Newport Authority series, Newport Authority 2, was released for free as a prelude to PA2.

The self-produced album is narrated by New York actor/director Michael Rapaport and features guest appearances from Talib Kweli, Posdnuos, Masta Ace, Kardinal Offishall, Styles P, Lil Fame, Gangrene, MC Eiht, King Tee, Celph Titled, Large Professor, Inspectah Deck, Rah Digga, Slaine, Ill Bill, Organized Konfusion, and The Doppelgangaz among others. Scratches on PA2 are provided by DJ Revolution, DJ Premier, Shylow (of First Division), DJ Linx and DJ Romes.

The album was preceded by one single – "3-O-Clock," an Organized Konfusion reunion track, along with four promotional singles: "G.U.R.U.," a tribute to the late Gang Starr emcee featuring Talib Kweli and DJ Premier, "Astonishing" featuring Large Professor, Inspectah Deck, O.C., Tragedy Khadafi and DJ Revolution, "West Coast Love" featuring MC Eiht, King Tee and DJ Revolution, and "Strange Brew" featuring Gangrene and DJ Romes.

== Critical reception ==
Professional ratings
Review scores
| Source | Rating |
|---|---|
| Exclaim! | 9/10 |
| HipHopDX | 3.5/5 stars |
| HipHopSite | 4/5 stars |
| RapReviews | 8/10 |

PA2: The Director's Cut was met with favorable reviews from music critics. HipHopDX reviewer Homer Johnsen gave the album a 3.5 out of five, saying "Though it is sometimes prone to monotony and lags here and there, PA2: The Director's Cut successfully draws from its prequel, while maintaining its own originality. With regards to guest appearances, Marco Polo deserves credit for picking from the cream of the crop, as well as successfully pairing artists on certain tracks ('Astonishing'). The album also establishes excellent flow and sequencing from track to track, especially towards the end, as things conclude with the aptly titled Guru tribute 'G.U.R.U.'" Matt Wright of HipHopSite gave the album a four out of five, saying "With a lot of glut on the market, so many rappers from the past disappointing, and many of the best fading away, Marco Polo should be viewed as a cornerstone of the last decade for classic hip-hop. He's brought together a plethora of the best from the past thirty years, produced for present underground favorites and sleepers, and been able to make all of them sound at their best." Grant Jones of RapReviews gave the album an eight out of ten, saying "Port Authority 2 is proof, if ever it was needed, that taking time with projects tends to equal a superior product. Whoever nails Marco down for a solo project will be truly blessed, and safe in the knowledge that he is the cream of the crop when it comes to this east coast boom bap in 2013." Exclaim! reviewer Mark Bozzer gave the album a nine out of ten, saying "Kudos to Marco for putting together a project that simultaneously pleases the heads, pays homage to the art form as a whole, and shows off just how well his skills as a beatmaker (and networker) have improved since his last record."

== Singles ==
On September 17, 2013, "3-O-Clock" was released as the album's lead single. It features Pharoahe Monch and Prince Po of Organized Konfusion reuniting for the first time since 1997. Its music video premiered on YouTube by Soulspazm on September 26, 2013, and was directed by The Doppelgangaz with additional cinematography by Joshua "Big Josh" McIntyre.

== Track listing ==
| No. | Title | Performer(s) | Length |
|---|---|---|---|
| 1. | "3-O-Clock" | Organized Konfusion (Pharoahe Monch & Prince Po) | 4:25 |
| 2. | "Savages" | Slaine, Celph Titled, Ill Bill | 4:04 |
| 3. | "Earrings Off" | Rah Digga | 3:59 |
| 4. | "Can't Get Enough" | Big Twins, Nature, F.T. | 4:48 |
| 5. | "Astonishing" | Large Professor, Inspectah Deck, O.C., Tragedy Khadafi | 5:06 |
| 6. | "6 Trill" | Last Emperor | 4:30 |
| 7. | "West Coast Love" | MC Eiht, King Tee | 3:41 |
| 8. | "Wrong Girl" | Reach, Reggie B. | 4:25 |
| 9. | "Drunken Sleuth" | Invincible | 3:40 |
| 10. | "Intermission" | Michael Rapaport | 1:56 |
| 11. | "Emergency Man" | Malcolm & Martin (Styliztik Jones & KB iMean) | 4:36 |
| 12. | "Strange Brew" | Gangrene (The Alchemist & Oh No) | 2:47 |
| 13. | "What They Say" | Kardinal Offishall, Lil Fame (of M.O.P.), Styles P | 3:56 |
| 14. | "Parental Discretion" | Breezly Brewin (of The Juggaknots) | 4:08 |
| 15. | "Underdogs" | Supastition, Shylow (of First Division) | 4:11 |
| 16. | "R U Gonna Eat That" | The Doppelgangaz | 3:29 |
| 17. | "Sucka Free" | Blaq Poet, Hannibal Stax, Panchi (of NYG'z) | 5:23 |
| 18. | "G.U.R.U." | Talib Kweli, DJ Premier | 4:51 |
| 19. | "Glory (Finish Hard)" | Masta Ace, A.G., Posdnuos (of De La Soul), Dion | 5:21 |
| Total length: | | | 79:16 |

Notes

- All tracks were produced by Marco Polo.
- Scratches were provided by DJ Linx (Track 1), DJ Revolution (Tracks 2, 5, 7 & 11), Shylow (Tracks 3, 6, 13 & 15), DJ Romes (Track 12), and DJ Premier (Track 18).
