= Tylko dla dorosłych =

Studio album by O.S.T.R.
- Released: February 26, 2010 (Poland)
- Recorded: 2009–2010
- Genre: Hip-hop
- Length: 47:13
- Label: Asfalt Records
- Producer: O.S.T.R.

O.S.T.R. chronology
O.c.b. (2009)	Tylko dla dorosłych (2010)	Jazz, dwa, trzy (2011)

Tylko dla dorosłych (Polish pronunciation: [ˌtɨlkɔ dla dɔˈrɔswɨx], English: Only for adults) is an album released by Polish rapper O.S.T.R. on February 26, 2010. The album reached #1 on the OLiS charts.

== Track listing ==
1. "Tak To Się Zaczęło" - 1:51
2. "Przez Stress" - 3:44
3. "Konsumpcjonizm" - 3:17
4. "Spalic Gniew" - 4:13
5. "To Potrwa Sekundę" - 2:33
6. "Spij Spokojnie" - 3:57
7. "Walka Z Wrogiem" - 3:16
8. "Nie Wszystko Co Złe" - 3:32
9. "Zywy Lub Martwy" - 4:00
10. "Nie Odwracając Się" - 3:27
11. "Za Drugim Razem" - 2:33
12. "To Nie Czas" - 3:34
13. "Dowód W Twoich Rekach" - 3:45
14. "Klucz Do Zagadki" - 2:49
15. "Przemyśl To Sobie" - 0:42
