= Jarmark =

Studio album by Taco Hemingway
- Released: August 28, 2020
- Genre: hip-hop, alternative hip-hop, pop rap
- Length: 41:25; 44:41 (deluxe edition)
- Label: Taco Corp, 2020
- Producer: Rumak, Borucci, Pejzaż, CatchUp, Lanek

Taco Hemingway chronology
Pocztówka z WWA, lato '19 (2019)	Jarmark (2020)	Europa (2020)

Jarmark is the fourth studio album by Polish rapper Taco Hemingway. It was released on August 28, 2020, by Taco Corp and 2020. The recordings were made available on the rapper's website and on YouTube. The material, recorded by 2020, was produced by multiple producers. The album represents a hip-hop style with influences from alternative hip-hop. The main themes of the lyrics are dilemmas about the country, political topics and problems of the young society.

Jarmark got an average reception from music critics. Reviewers praised the artist for touching on the political problems of Poles, but accused the rapper of a number of populist verses. The album debuted on the first place of the nationwide sales list OLiS, spreading in more than 30,000 copies. Moreover, it was the eighth best-selling album of 2020 in Poland.

== Background and release ==
On July 10, 2020, the day before the election silence, a single entitled "Polskie Tango" is released, which depicts the Polish mentality, expresses worry about the state of the country and refers to the political situation in Poland, criticizing it. The single announced the album Jarmark, for the summer of 2020. The single achieved high commercial success, echoing loudly in the media. On 28 July, the rapper announced via Instagram that the albums release was postponed from July to late August/early September. On July 31, the album cover was released, by Partyka, who was accused of plagiarism from the work of American photographer Alex Prager. The author of the cover issued a statement that Alex's work was only an inspiration and it is mentioned in the physical version of the album. Eventually, the album was released with a different cover.

On August 28, 2020, the rapper again unexpectedly released the album Jarmark, making it available on streaming services and as a free download on his website. On September 4, the album went on sale in a physical version, in stores nationwide. On January 14, 2021, the album was released in a vinyl version.

== Track listing ==
All tracks are written by Filip Szcześniak.

No.	Title	Writer(s)	Producer(s)	Length
1.	"Łańcuch I: Kiosk" (featuring Artur Rojek)	Szcześniak	Rumak	2:22
2.	"Panie, to Wyście!"	Szcześniak	Pejzaż	3:45
3.	"Polskie Tango"	Szcześniak	Lanek	3:03
4.	"Influenza" (featuring Gruby Mielzky)	Szcześniak, Tomasz Mielewski	Borucci	4:28
5.	"Nie mam czasu" (featuring CatchUp)	Szcześniak, Catch Up	Rumak	3:22
6.	"Łańcuch II: Korek" (featuring Artur Rojek)	Szcześniak	Rumak	2:22
7.	"Dwuzłotówki Dancing"	Szcześniak	Rumak	4:44
8.	"POL Smoke"	Szcześniak	Borucci	3:33
9.	"W.N.P."	Szcześniak	CatchUp	3:23
10.	"1990s Utopia" (featuring Katarzyna Kowalczyk)	Szcześniak	Pejzaż	4:00
11.	"Szczękościsk"	Szcześniak	Rumak	3:58
12.	"Łańcuch III: Korpo" (featuring Artur Rojek)	Szcześniak	Rumak	2:25
Total length:				41:25

Deluxe edition
No.	Title	Writer(s)	Producer(s)	Length
13.	"Sznycel"	Szcześniak	Rumak	3:16
Total length:				44:41

== Charts ==
Chart (2020)	Peak position
OLiS	1

== Certifications ==
Certification	Number of copies	Date
gold	15 000+	24 September 2020
platinum	30 000+	10 November 2021
