= Marco Polo (producer) =

Canadian record producer and rapper

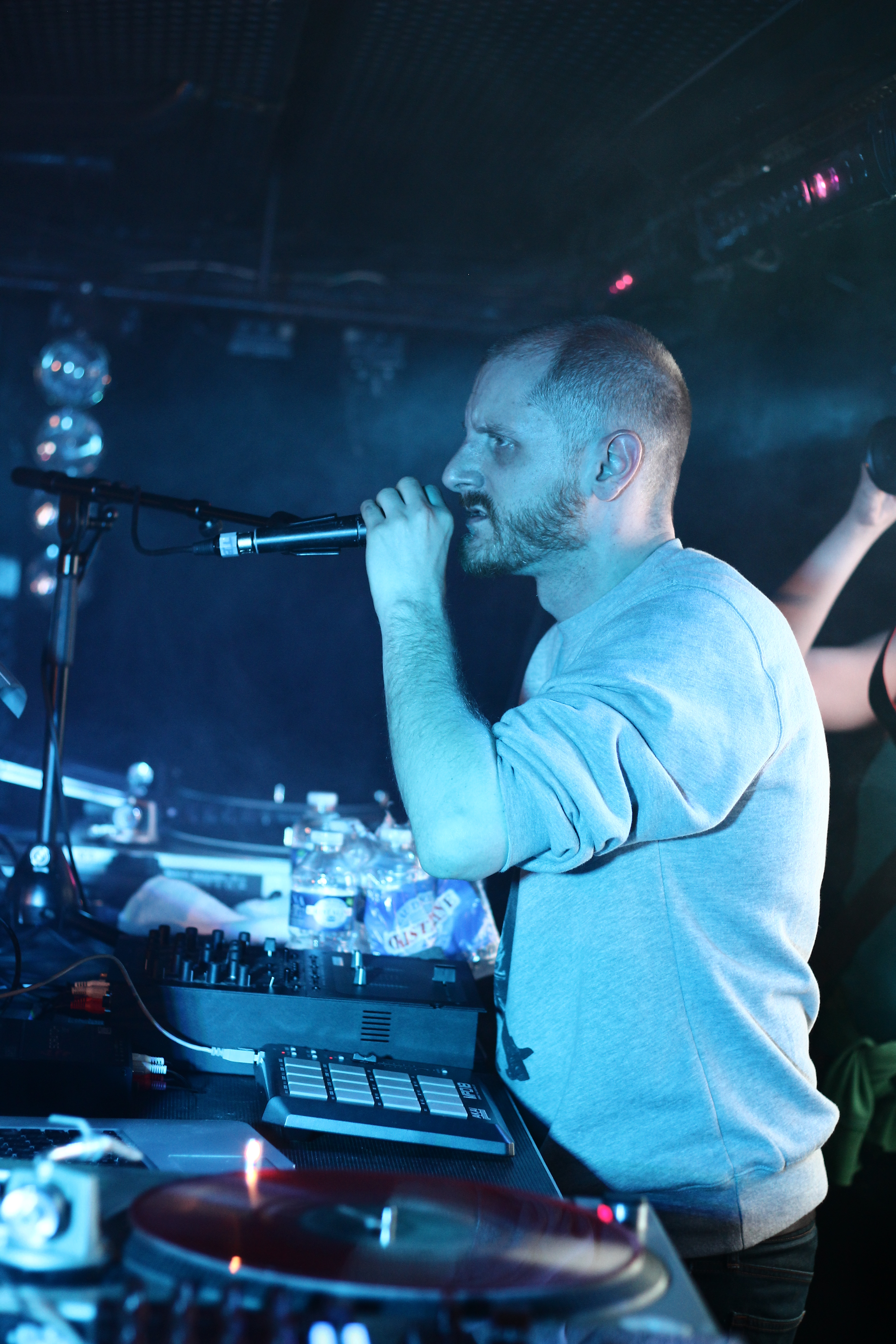
- Marco Polo performing in 2014

Background information
- Born: Marco Bruno; December 26, 1979 (age 46); Toronto, Ontario, Canada
- Genres: Hip hop
- Occupation: Record producer
- Years active: 2002–present
- Labels: Asfalt Records; Duck Down Music; Fat Beats; Macro Beats; Pockets Linted Entertainment; Rawkus Records; Soulspazm

Marco Bruno (born December 26, 1979), better known by his stage name Marco Polo, is a Canadian hip hop record producer. Born and raised in Toronto, Ontario, he is based in New York City, New York.

== Life and career ==
On December 26, 1979, Marco Polo was born Marco Bruno in Toronto. He is of Italian descent. He went to an audio engineering school in Toronto. In the early 2000s, he moved to New York City. He interned at The Cutting Room Studios.

In 2007, he released a solo studio album, Port Authority. It was nominated for Rap Recording of the Year at the 2008 Juno Awards. In 2009, he released a collaborative album with rapper Torae, titled Double Barrel. In 2010, he released a collaborative album with rapper Ruste Juxx, titled The Exxecution. In 2013, he released a solo studio album, PA2: The Director's Cut. It was nominated for Rap Recording of the Year at the 2015 Juno Awards. In June 2024, Masta Ace and Marco Polo's "P.P.E." was nominated for the Hollywood Independent Music Awards in the Adult Contemporary Hip Hop category.

== Discography ==
=== Studio albums ===
- Port Authority (2007)
- Double Barrel (2009) (with Torae)
- The Exxecution (2010) (with Ruste Juxx)
- Seize the Day (2013) (with Hannibal Stax)
- PA2: The Director's Cut (2013)
- Kartagina (2014) (with O.S.T.R.)
- A Breukelen Story (2018) (with Masta Ace)
- Midnight Run (2023) (with Torae)
- Richmond Hill (with Masta Ace) (2024)

=== Compilation albums ===
- Canned Goods (2005)
- Newport Authority (2007)
- The Stupendous Adventures of Marco Polo! (2010)
- Newport Authority 2 (2013)
- MPC: Marco Polo Collectables (2015)
- Baker's Dozen (2017)

=== EPs ===
- Per La Mia Gente (2012) (with Bassi Maestro and Ghemon Scienz)
- Rare Instrumentals Volume One (2013)
- A-F-R-O POLO (2016) (with A-F-R-O)
- A Breukelen Story: Bonus EP (2019) (with Masta Ace)

=== Singles ===
- "My Rights" / "Situations" / "I Just Wanna Rhyme" (2005)
- "War" (2007)
- "The Radar" (2007)
- "Double Barrel" / "Hold Up" / "Combat Drills" (2009) (with Torae)
- "Nobody" / "Rearview" (2010) (with Ruste Juxx)
- "Back to Work" / "I Refuse" (2013)
- "Side Effects" (2014) (with O.S.T.R.)
- "Nostalgia" (2018)
- "E.A.T." / "Masta Polo" (2019) (with Masta Ace)

=== Productions ===
- Shylow - "The Greatest" (2002)
- Masta Ace - "Do It Man" from A Long Hot Summer (2004)
- Rasco - "What Happened to the Game" and "Situations" from The Dick Swanson Theory (2005)
- Sadat X - "If You" from Black October (2006)
- Pumpkinhead - Orange Moon Over Brooklyn (2006)
- Boot Camp Clik - "My World" and "I Want Mine" from Casualties of War (2007)
- Special Teamz - "One Call" from Stereotypez (2007)
- Reef the Lost Cauze - "I Wonder" from A Vicious Cycle (2008)
- Heltah Skeltah - "Insane" from D.I.R.T. (2008)
- Braille - "The IV" from The IV Edition (2008)
- 9th Uno - "Sleep" from Unassociated Press (2008)
- KRS-One & Buckshot - "Oh Really" from Survival Skills (2009)
- Critical Madness - "Empirical" from Bringing Out the Dead (2009)
- D.O. - "Bully" from Stay Driven (2009)
- Verbal Kent - "Monologue" from Save Your Friends (2010)
- Verbal Kent - "My City" from Save Yourself (2011)
- Pharoahe Monch - "W.A.R." from W.A.R. (We Are Renegades) (2011)
- Talib Kweli - "Palookas" from Gutter Rainbows (2011)
- Torae - "You Ready" from For the Record (2011)
- J-Live - "The Authentic" and "Pronounced Spitta" from S.P.T.A. (Said Person of That Ability) (2011)
- Neek the Exotic & Large Professor - "Hip Hop" and "My Own Line" from Still on the Hustle (2011)
- Large Professor - "Professor @ Large" from Professor @ Large (2012)
- Vinnie Paz - "Crime Library" from God of the Serengeti (2012)
- Copywrite - "Opium Prodigies" from God Save the King (2012)
- MHz Legacy - "Obituaries" from MHz Legacy (2012)
- 4th Pyramid - "Feel It in My Bones" from The Pyramid Scheme (2012)
- Koncept - "Watch the Sky Fall" from Awaken (2012)
- Supastition - "Yada Yada" from The Blackboard EP (2013)
- R.A. the Rugged Man - "Shoot Me in the Head" from Legends Never Die (2013)
- Demigodz - "Audi 5000" from Killmatic (2013)
- Pharoahe Monch - "Time2", "Rapid Eye Movement", and "The Jungle" from PTSD (2014)
- Nature - "Throw It Up" from Seasons Changed: Winter Edition (2014)
- First Division - "Intro", "Life & Death", "The Trade", "Bottom Line", and "Take Your Time" from The Critical Path Pt. 1 (2014)
- First Division - "Intro", "Work Force", "B.R.A.W.L.", and "Victorious" from The Critical Path Pt. 2 (2014)
- La Coka Nostra - "Blind" from To Thine Own Self Be True (2016)
- Snak the Ripper - "Premium Dope" from From the Dirt (2016)
- M-Dot - "Dreamscape" from Ego and the Enemy (2017)
- Milano Constantine - "British Walkers", "That Feeling", and "10-4" from The Way We Were (2017)
- Talib Kweli & Styles P - "Nine Point Five" from The Seven (2017)
- Sean Price - "Prisoner" from Imperius Rex (2017)
- Phonte - "So Help Me God" from No News Is Good News (2018)
- Guè - "Nicholas Cage" feat. Jadakiss from Gvesvs (2021)
