= O.S.T.R. =

Polish rapper (born 1980)

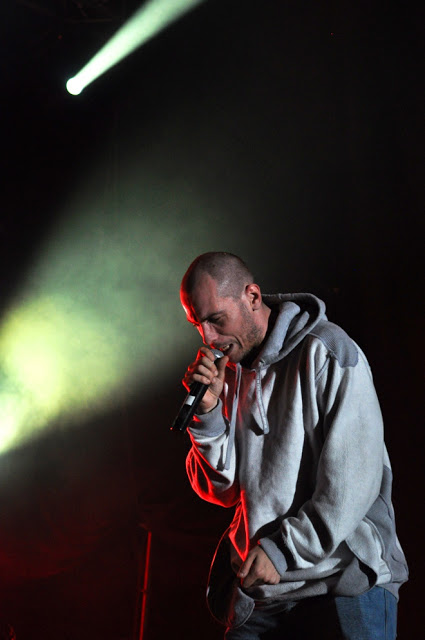
- O.S.T.R. in 2011
- Born: Adam Andrzej Ostrowski; 15 May 1980 (age 46); Łódź, Poland
- Education: Academy of Music in Łódź
- Occupations: Rapper; musician; record producer; audio engineer
- Spouse: Natalia Ostrowska
- Children: 2
- Parent(s): Barbara Ostrowska; Marek Ostrowski
- Musical career
- Also known as: O.S.T.R.; Ostry; Oster
- Genres: Hip-hop; jazz rap; political hip-hop; alternative hip-hop
- Instruments: Vocals; violin; keyboards; sampler
- Years active: 1997–present
- Label: Asfalt Records

Adam Andrzej Ostrowski (Polish pronunciation: [ˈadam ɔsˈtrɔfskʲi], born 15 May 1980 in Łódź, Poland), better known as O.S.T.R., is a Polish rapper, musician, audio engineer and record producer, famous for his freestyle rap skills, ambitious lyrics and unique beats. He graduated from the Academy of Music in Łódź, violin class. He is one of the few Polish rappers who have received professional musical education. He has collaborated with American rappers such as Evidence, El Da Sensei, Craig G, Keith Murray, Jeru The Damaja, Lil' Dap, Sadat X and Canadian producer Marco Polo. He has also collaborated with many Polish artists, including jazz musicians Michał Urbaniak, AbradAb Hades, SOFA, Fokus, DJ Deszczu Strugi, DonGURALesko, Vienio i Pelson, Fu, Pezet, Sistars and Slums Attack. He is a member of bands such as Tabasko, Skill Mega, Killing Skills, Beat Brothers and musical project POE. He is also a former member of Obóz TA and LWC. In 2013, he shared the position of art director of Męskie Granie festival with alternative rock vocalist Kasia Nosowska.

== Discography ==
=== Studio albums ===
Title	Album details	Peak chart positions	Sales	Certifications
Title	Album details	POL	Sales	Certifications
Saturator	Released: 2000; Label: Self-released; Formats: CD	—		
Masz to jak w banku	Released: 8 October 2001; Label: Asfalt Records; Formats: CD, digital download	—	POL: 2,000+	
30 minut z życia	Released: 8 April 2002; Label: Asfalt Records; Formats: CD	—		
Tabasko	Released: 24 June 2002; Label: Asfalt Records; Formats: CD, digital download	29	POL: 4,000+	
Jazz w wolnych chwilach	Released: 8 December 2003; Label: Asfalt Records; Formats: CD, digital download	21		
Jazzurekcja	Released: 22 November 2004; Label: Asfalt Records; Formats: CD, digital download	5		
7	Released: 27 February 2006; Label: Asfalt Records; Formats: CD, digital download	2		
HollyŁódź	Released: 26 February 2007; Label: Asfalt Records; Formats: CD, digital download	2	POL: 15,000+	POL: Gold
Ja tu tylko sprzątam	Released: 25 February 2008; Label: Asfalt Records; Formats: CD, digital download	1	POL: 15,000+	POL: Gold
O.c.b.	Released: 2 March 2009; Label: Asfalt Records; Formats: CD, digital download	2	POL: 15,000+	POL: Gold
Jazzurekcja: Addendum	Released: 30 November 2009; Label: Asfalt Records; Formats: CD, digital download	—		
Tylko dla dorosłych	Released: 1 March 2010; Label: Asfalt Records; Formats: CD, digital download	1	POL: 30,000+	POL: Platinum
Tylko dla dorosłych. Instrumentals	Released: 8 August 2010; Label: Asfalt Records; Formats: CD	—		
Jazz, dwa, trzy	Released: 21 February 2011; Label: Asfalt Records; Formats: CD, LP, digital download	2	POL: 30,000+	POL: Platinum
Podróż zwana życiem	Released: 23 February 2015; Label: Asfalt Records; Formats: CD, LP, digital download	1	POL: 60,000+	POL: 2× Platinum
Życie po śmierci	Released: 26 February 2016; Label: Asfalt Records; Formats: CD, LP, digital download	1	POL: 90,000+	POL: 3× Platinum
W drodze po szczęście	Released: 23 February 2018; Label: Asfalt Records; Formats: CD, LP, digital download	1	POL: 30,000+	POL: Platinum
"—" denotes a recording that did not chart or was not released in that territory.

=== Collaborative albums ===
Title	Album details	Peak chart positions	Sales	Certifications
Title	Album details	POL	Sales	Certifications
Trójka Live! (with SOFA)	Released: 24 October 2007; Label: 3 Sky Media; Formats: CD	—		
Galerianki (with Skinny Patrini)	Released: 11 September 2009; Label: Asfalt Records; Formats: CD	—		
Podostrzyfszy... (with Warszafski Deszcz)	Released: 8 October 2009; Label: Asfalt Records, Wielkie Joł; Formats: LP	—		
Copycats EP (with Joe Kickass)	Released: 14 February 2012; Label: Asfalt Records; Formats: LP	—		
Haos (with Hades)	Released: 25 February 2013; Label: Asfalt Records; Formats: CD, digital download	1	POL: 30,000+	POL: Platinum
Kartagina (with Marco Polo)	Released: 4 March 2014; Label: Asfalt Records; Formats: CD, digital download	1	POL: 30, 000+	POL: Platinum
"—" denotes a recording that did not chart or was not released in that territory.

=== Live albums ===
Title	Album details	Peak chart positions	Sales	Certifications
Title	Album details	POL	Sales	Certifications
MTV Unplugged: Autentycznie	Released: 28 April 2017; Label: Asfalt Records; Formats: CD, digital download	1	POL: 15, 000+	POL: Gold

=== Music videos ===
Year	Song	Directed
2001	"Ile jestem w stanie dać"	-
2002	"Kochana Polsko"	Bogumił Godfrejow
2003	"Rap po godzinach"	-
2004	"Odzyskamy Hip-hop"	Bogumił Godrejow
2004	"Komix"	-
2006	"Początek..."	-
2006	"Z odzysku"	-
2006	"Więcej decybeli by zagłuszyć" featuring Zeus	Bogumił Godrejow
2007	"Brother on the Run" featuring Craig G	Michał Poniedzielski; Remigiusz Wojaczek
2008	"1980"	Tomek Czubak
2008	"Jak nie Ty, to Kto?" featuring Brother J	Balbina Bruszewska
2009	"Po drodze do nieba"	Tomek Czubak
2010	"Śpij spokojnie"	Michał Rułka
2011	"Szpiedzy tacy jak my"	Bogumił Godrejow; Mikołaj Górecki

== Movies ==
- Z odzysku (2006, as himself)
- Ziomek (2006, voice)
