= Asfalt Records =

- Founded: 1998
- Founder: Marcin "Tytus” Grabski
- Distributor: Warner Music Poland
- Genre: Hip-hop
- Country of origin: Poland
- Location: Warsaw, Poland
- Official website: www.asfalt.pl

Asfalt Records is a Polish independent record label specialized in hip-hop music. It was founded in 1998 by Marcin "Tytus" Grabski. In July 1998, Asfalt Records signed a three-year distribution deal with Sony Music Entertainment Poland. The first album released by Asfalt Records was the debut of Polish group OMP Wilanów... zobacz różnicę, which was released on December 16, 1998. Afterwards, two groups, RHX and Płomień 81 joined the label. In June 1999, the label released a 12" single Otzafszetu/Oempe, which was most likely to be the first hip-hop record released in such format. In February 2001, Grabski founded a sub-label Teeto Records that was supposed to release hip-hop-related records.

In April 2007, album HollyŁódź by O.S.T.R. was certified as gold record. It was the first Asfalt's record, which reached that status. The first platinum record was also O.S.T.R.'s album Tylko dla dorosłych, released in 2010.

So far, Asfalt Records has released albums for artists such as O.S.T.R., Medium, The Jonesz, Patr00, Ortega Cartel, Killing Skills, Flirtini, Zorak 3000, Sztigar Bonko, Rasmentalism, DJ Haem, Noon, The Returners, POE, Envee, Afront, Bassisters Orchestra, Emade, Tworzywo Sztuczne, Tabasko, Łona, Onar, Taco Hemingway, Inespe, Fisz and O$ka.
