= Muzyka Klasyczna =

Studio album by Pezet/Noon
- Released: April 5, 2002
- Genre: Hip hop
- Label: T1-Teraz
- Producer: Noon

Pezet/Noon chronology
| Muzyka Klasyczna (2002) | Muzyka Poważna (2004) |

Muzyka Klasyczna is the first collaborative album by Polish rapper Pezet, a member of Płomień 81; and Polish producer Noon, a member of Grammatik.

== Track list ==
| No. | Title | Featuring(s) | Length |
|---|---|---|---|
| 1. | "To tylko ja" | | 2:58 |
| 2. | "Re-fleksje" | | 3:27 |
| 3. | "5-10-15" | Mes | 4:06 |
| 4. | "Fraza 01" | | 0:19 |
| 5. | "Bez twarzy" | | 2:27 |
| 6. | "Seniorita" | | 3:10 |
| 7. | "Slang" | | 3:08 |
| 8. | "Forma 01" | | 0:27 |
| 9. | "Zimna fuzja" | Fokus | 3:11 |
| 10. | "Wibracja 03" | | 0:26 |
| 11. | "Rap robię" | Eldo, Małolat | 4:00 |
| 12. | "Ukryty w mieście krzyk" | | 3:21 |
| 13. | "Te same dni, te same sny" | Ash | 4:25 |
| 14. | "Muzyka instrumentalna" | | 1:14 |
