= Muzyka Emocjonalna =

EP by Pezet
- Released: June 2, 2009
- Genre: Hip hop
- Producer: Zjawin, Czarny

Pezet chronology
Muzyka Rozrywkowa (2007)	Muzyka Emocjonalna (2009)

Muzyka Emocjonalna (Emotional Music) is the first EP and seventh album overall by Polish rapper Pezet, a member of Płomień 81. The EP was only sold on the official website of the project, with a limited run of only 5,000 copies made available. The rarity of the album made it a collector's item among fans, leading to its re-release in 2018.

== Track list ==
No.	Title	Featuring	Length
1.	"Noc i Dzień (remix)"	Małolat and Fame District	5:02
2.	"W Moim Świecie (remix)"	Lilu	2:18
3.	"Źrenice"		3:52
4.	"Widzę Jej Obraz"		4:23
5.	"Ciemno"		5:36
6.	"Spadam"		3:26
7.	"Nie Tego Chcę"		2:04
8.	"Światła Zgasły"		4:54
9.	"Nieważne"	Krzysztof Rychard	4:33
10.	"W Moim Świecie (remix 2)"	Lilu	3:27
11.	"Spadam (Zjawin remix)"		5:03
12.	"Nieważne (Zjawin remix)"		2:39
13.	"Spadam (Czarny remix)"		7:57
