= Muzyka Poważna =

Studio album by Pezet/Noon
- Released: 22 April 2004
- Genre: Hip hop
- Label: Embargo Nagrania
- Producer: Noon, Ajron

Pezet/Noon chronology
Muzyka Klasyczna (2002)	Muzyka Poważna (2004)	Muzyka Rozrywkowa (2007)

Muzyka Poważna is the second collaborative album by Polish rapper Pezet, a member of Płomień 81; and Polish producers Noon, a member of Grammatik, and Ajron (Michał Dąbal). The album was released in April 2004 by Embargo Nagrania and sold over 10,000 copies as of December 2004.

The leader of Polish rock band Fatum, Piotr Bajus, claims that their song "Błaganie" was illegally used in the Arjon remix of "Nie jestem dawno". Bajus was moving to take legal action by the end of 2004, with the goal to stop further sales of Muzyka Poważna.

== Track list ==
No.	Title	Length
1.	"(To) Tylko raz 01" (Eng: "Only once 01")	1:44
2.	"Intro"	0:30
3.	"(To) Tylko raz 02" (Eng: "Only once 02")	2:44
4.	"To samo" (Eng: "The same")	3:46
5.	"Retro 01"	2:47
6.	"Nie jestem dawno" (Eng: "I'm not long ago")	3:47
7.	"Wibracja 04" (Eng: "Vibration 04")	0:21
8.	"Szósty zmysł" (Eng: "Sixth sense")	3:48
9.	"Retro 02"	2:34
10.	"Cepelia"	0:40
11.	"A mieliśmy być poważni..." (Eng: "And we were supposed to be serious ...")	3:16
12.	"W branży"	4:39
13.	"Gubisz ostrość" (Eng: "You're losing focus")	4:04
14.	"Dziś" (Eng: "Today")	2:52
15.	"Retro 03"	2:31
16.	"Nie jestem dawno" (Ajron remix)	3:52
