= Muzyka Rozrywkowa =

Studio album by Pezet
- Released: October 15, 2007
- Genre: Hip hop
- Producer: Szogun

Pezet chronology
Muzyka Poważna (2004)	Muzyka Rozrywkowa (2007)	Muzyka Emocjonalna (2009)

Muzyka Rozrywkowa (Entertainment Music) is the first solo album by Polish rapper Pezet released in 2007. A commercial success, it has achieved Platinum status in Poland. According to VICE, the album helped to establish the new hip-hop in Poland.

Pezet has stated that it was a difficult album to write because it was created at the peak of his partying lifestyle. Once the album was released, however, he went through several years of sobriety to stay fit for stage performances.

The original album has 15 tracks. It was re-released in 2018 with a second CD of remixes.

== Track list ==
No.	Title	Featuring(s)	Length
1.	"#1"		3:28
2.	"Halo"		2:21
3.	"Na tym osiedlu"		4:33
4.	"Lubię"	Onar	3:33
5.	"Nie tylko hit na lato"		3:45
6.	"Pezet jak..."		3:16
7.	"Niegrzeczna"	WdoWA	4:20
8.	"Noc i dzień"	Małolat, Fame District	4:51
9.	"Mamy ten styl"		3:59
10.	"Pornogwiazdy"	2cztery7	5:16
11.	"Lojalność"		3:19
12.	"Sexmisja"	Kali(Szybki Szmal)	4:26
13.	"Czterdzieściprocent"	Mes	3:04
14.	"Takie jak Ty"	WdoWA	3:52
15.	"Gdyby miało nie być jutra"		4:04
