= Dziś w moim mieście =

Studio album by Pezet and Małolat
- Released: October 2, 2010
- Genre: Hip hop
- Length: 49:38
- Label: Koka Beats
- Producer: Czarny; The Returners; Donatan; DJ. B

Dziś w moim mieście is the first studio album of the two brothers: Pezet and Małolat. It was released in 2010. The production of the album was assigned to Donotan, The Returners, Szczur and DJ. BZa. Most of the beats were created by Czarny from the HIFI rap group, he was also assigned for the final mix of the album. There are some guest appearances on this album, like Grizzulah from The EastWest Rockers, VNM, members of the rap group Molesta Ewenement, Małpa and an Italian rapper Fabri Fibra.

== Track list ==
No.	Title	Featuring(s)	Length
1.	"Intro"		1:08
2.	"Zaalarmuj"		2:53
3.	"Dziś w moim mieście"	Grizzulah	3:49
4.	"Jestem sam"		3:26
5.	"Nagapiłem się"		3:49
6.	"Gdzie byśmy dziś byli"	Małpa	4:12
7.	"Koka"	VNM	4:40
8.	"Co by to zmieniło"	Molesta Ewenement, Grizzulah	5:29
9.	"Dopamina"		3:26
10.	"Hip hop robi dla mnie"	Fabri Fibra	4:40
11.	"Tak łatwo było"		4:50
12.	"Odkąd ostatnio gadaliśmy"	Diox	4:26
13.	"Chciałbym uciec stąd"		2:42
