= Popek =

Polish rapper and martial arts fighter

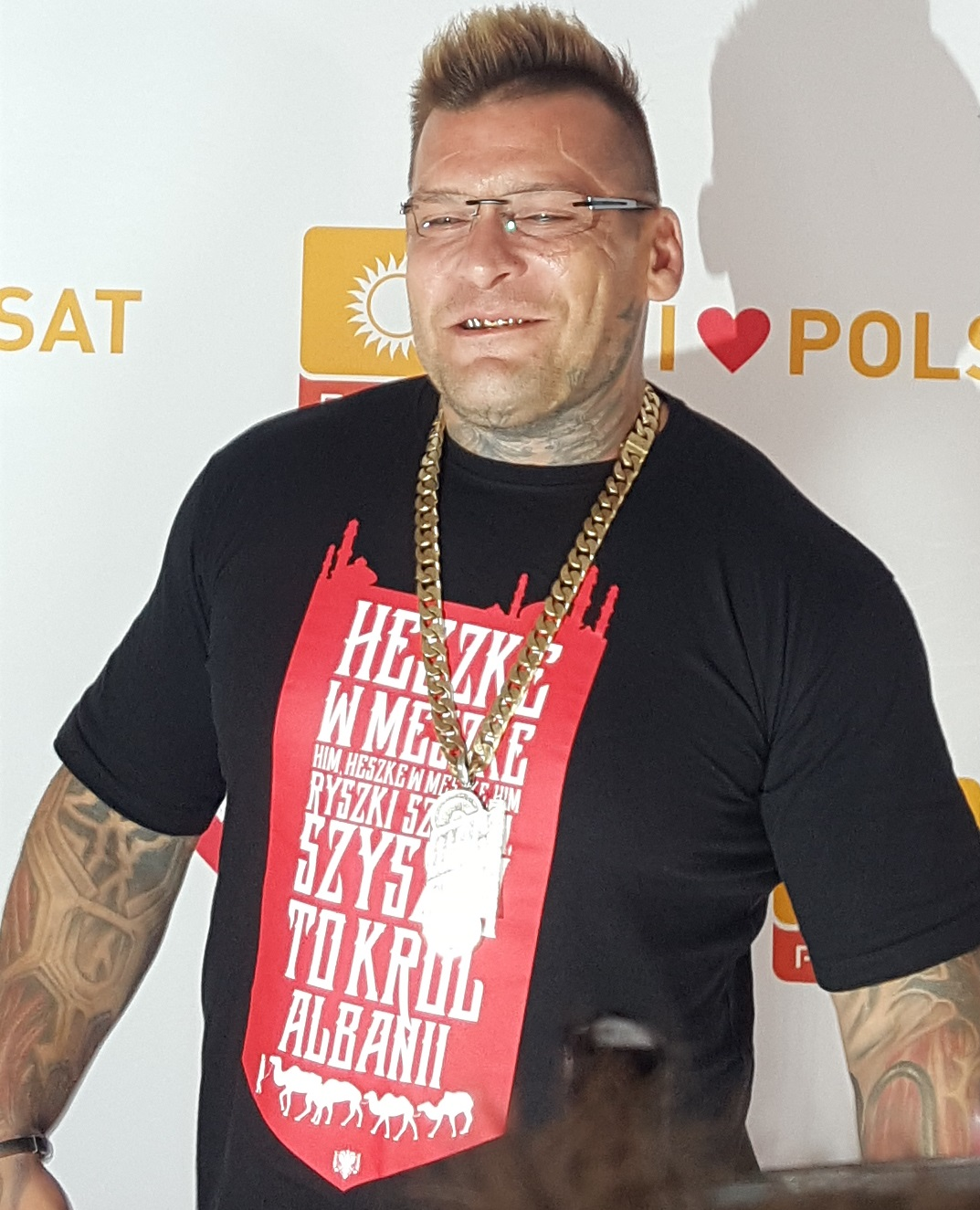
- Popek
- Born: Paweł Ryszard Przystal; 2 December 1978 (age 47); Legnica, Poland
- Other name: Popek Rak Monster
- Occupations: Rapper, MMA fighter
- Children: Daughter
- Musical career
- Genres: Gangsta rap, grime, dubstep, trap, hardcore rap
- Instruments: Vocals, guitar
- Years active: 2001–present
- Labels: EntyRecords, Wag Wan Production, Prosto
- Formerly of: Firma
- Martial arts career
- Height: 183 cm (6 ft 0 in)
- Weight: 116 kg (256 lb; 18 st 4 lb)
- Stance: Orthodox
- Fighting out of: Warsaw, Poland
- Team: Team Titan
- Years active: 2008-present (MMA)

Other information
- Mixed martial arts record from Sherdog
- Website: Popek Monster on Facebook

Paweł Ryszard Mikołajuw ⟨ IPA: /ˈpävɛw ˈrɨʂärt ˌmʲikɔˈwäjuf/⟩ (born 2 December 1978), also known as Popek, Popek Monster and Król Albanii (The King of Albania), is a Polish rapper and professional mixed martial arts fighter. In 2000, together with such rappers as Bosski Roman, Tadek, Pomidor and Kali founded the group Firma. Popek creates music from the border of dubstep, grime and gangsta rap.

Popek left his family home at the age of 14 and therefore never got a proper education. He speaks Polish, English and German, though only fluent in Polish.

Solo activities began in 2007, Popek has since released three albums, including one self-released. The album Monster was certified Gold in Poland and the Czech Republic. Firma has recorded 6 albums, Popek however was not involved in the production of the album NieLegalne Rytmy: Kontynuacja.

He collaborated with such artists as Chronik, Krept and Konan, Big Narstie, JME, Professor Green, Jędker, Sokół, Peja, Virus Syndicate, Tempa T, P Money, Devlin, Wiley, Małolat, The Game, Sean Price, Stitches. and Big H.

Popek became famous for getting his eyeballs tattooed, and for hanging on hooks in the music video for Pain be My Guest.

== Discography ==
With Firma

Year	Title	Peak chart positions	Certifications
Year	Title	POL	Certifications
2001	Pierwszy nielegal: Released: 2001; Label: Self-released	–	
2002	Z dedykacją dla ulicy: Released: 8 October 2002; Label: Zooteka	–	
2005	Nielegalne rytmy: Released: 2 May 2005; Label: Self-released	–	
2008	Przeciwko kurestwu i upadkowi zasad: Released: 8 October 2008; Label: Rockers Publishing	–	
2011	Nasza broń to nasza pasja: Released: 28 March 2011; Label: Fonografika	30	POL: Gold
"—" enotes a title that did not chart.

Solo albums

Year	Title	Peak chart positions	Certifications
Year	Title	POL	Certifications
2007	Wyjęty spod prawa: Released: 27 July 2007; Label: Self-released	—	
2008	HeavyWeight: Released: 5 June 2008; Label: EntyRecords	—	
2013	Monster: Released: 11 January 2013; Label: Wag Wan Production	28	POL: Gold; CZE: Gold; SK: Gold
"—" denotes a title that did not chart.

Monster 2 (2014)

== Mixed martial arts record ==
Professional record breakdown
7 matches	3 wins	4 losses
By knockout	2	4
By submission	1	0
By decision	0	0
Draws	0	

Res.	Record	Opponent	Method	Event	Date	Round	Time	Location	Notes
Loss	3-4	Erko Jun	TKO (punches)	KSW 45	6 October 2018	2	2:08	London, England	
Loss	3-3	Tomasz Oświeciński	TKO (punches)	KSW 41	23 December 2017	2	2:58	Katowice, Poland	
Win	3-2	Robert Burneika	Submission (punches)	KSW 39	27 May 2017	1	0:45	Warsaw, Poland	
Loss	2-2	Mariusz Pudzianowski	TKO (punches)	KSW 37	3 December 2016	1	1:20	Kraków, Poland	
Loss	2-1	Sander Duyvis	TKO (punches)	FX3: Fight Night 9	13 December 2008	1	4:04	Reading, England	
Win	2-0	Kev Sims	KO (punches)	Cage Rage 26	10 May 2008	1	1:12	Birmingham, England	
Win	1-0	Glen Reid	TKO (corner stoppage)	Cage Rage: Contenders 8	2 February 2008	2	1:56	London, England	
