= Michał Wawrykiewicz =

Polish politician (born 1971)

Michał Wawrykiewicz MEP
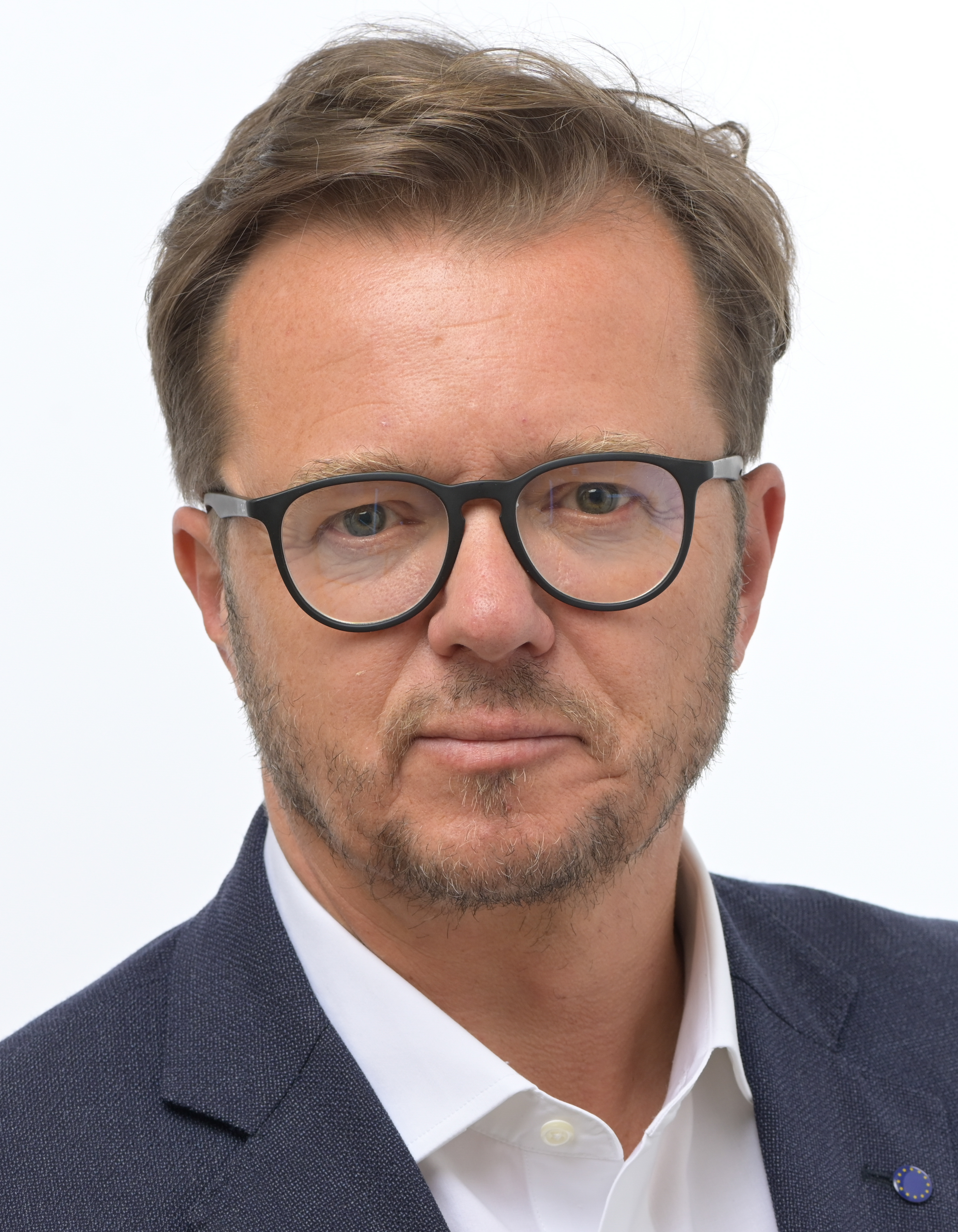
- Wawrykiewicz in 2024

Member of the European Parliament for Greater Poland
- Incumbent
- Assumed office 16 July 2024

Personal details
- Born: 11 May 1971 (age 55)
- Party: Independent
- Other political affiliations: Civic Coalition

Michał Wawrykiewicz (born 11 May 1971) is a Polish lawyer and politician of the Civic Coalition who was elected member of the European Parliament in 2024. He is a co-founder of Free Courts and the Justice Defence Committee, which advocate for the rule of law.

== Biography ==
=== Education and legal career ===
A graduate of the University of Warsaw. Between 1990 and 1996, he studied at the Faculty of Law and Administration, where he obtained a Master’s degree in Law. In 1999, he completed his legal apprenticeship, took a bar exam and began practising law.

In July 2017, together with Sylwia Gregorczyk-Abram, Maria Ejchart, and Paulina Kieszkowska, he co-founded the Free Courts (Wolne Sądy) initiative, an informal group of lawyers engaged in activities supporting the rule of law.

In 2018, as part of Free Courts, he was one of the initiators of the Justice Defence Committee, a platform for cooperation among several civic organizations and legal associations, providing legal assistance to persecuted judges and prosecutors. Along with Sylwia Gregorczyk-Abram, he also represented Bart Staszewski in cases regarding the prohibition of distributing “LGBT-free zone” stickers, as well as Elżbieta Podleśna in a defamation case against Magdalena Ogórek and Rafał Ziemkiewicz.

Michał Wawrykiewicz represented Polish judges before the Court of Justice of the European Union in consolidated cases related to preliminary questions concerning the compliance of the new method of appointing the National Council of the Judiciary and the establishment of the Disciplinary Chamber of the Supreme Court with the EU principle of the rule of law (which resulted in a judgment on November 19, 2019). He also represented Igor Tuleya before the European Court of Human Rights in the case of Tuleya v. Poland.

Since 2016, he has been active as a consultant and expert for parliamentary working groups, preparing opinions for the Sejm’s Bureau of Research and serving as a legal expert for the Speaker of the Senate in legislative processes. He has also been a consultant for the European Parliament’s Committee on Civil Liberties, Justice and Home Affairs (LIBE) regarding the rule of law in Poland. Additionally, he participated as a European Union expert in a Consolidation of the Justice System in Albania project (EURALIUS).

He is the author and co-author of texts published by OKO.press, Liberté!, and Verfassungsblog. In 2022, he became a fellow of the National Endowment for Democracy in Washington, where he worked on a program focusing on the role of civic movements in defending the rule of law and democracy. As part of this fellowship, he delivered lectures at universities such as Harvard, Yale, Georgetown, and New York University. In 2023, he co-founded and became a board member of DemoCrisis, an international organization dedicated to protecting the rule of law and judicial independence.

=== Political career ===
In the 2019 European Parliament elections, he unsuccessfully ran for an MEP mandate in District No. 7 in Poland as an independent candidate on the European Coalition list, receiving 35,750 votes. In 2024, he ran again in the same district in the next European Parliament elections (as an independent candidate supported by the Civic Coalition). This time, he received 119,068 votes (11.58% of the votes in the district), securing an MEP mandate.

In the 10th term of the European Parliament, he joined the European People’s Party (EPP) faction. He became a member of the Committee on Legal Affairs (JURI) and the Delegation for Relations with the United States (D-US). Additionally, he serves as a substitute member of the Committee on Civil Liberties, Justice and Home Affairs (LIBE), where he holds the position of EPP vice-coordinator, as well as the Special committee on the European Democracy Shield (EUDS). He is a board member of the Anti-Corruption Intergroup. Moreover, he acts as the shadow rapporteur for a report on the rule of law in Hungary.

As part of his MEP mandate, Michał Wawrykiewicz participated in an election observation mission in Moldova in October 2024. On October 23, 2024, on the anniversary of the outbreak of the Hungarian Revolution of 1956, he delivered a speech at Bem Square in Budapest, during a protest organized by the leader of the Hungarian opposition, Péter Magyar. In December 2024, he took part in a mission to Tbilisi, Georgia, where he met with President Salome Zourabichvili, opposition leaders, and representatives of non-governmental organizations in connection with ongoing pro-European and pro-democratic protests.

== Personal life ==
He was born in Warsaw.

He is the brother of rapper Jędker.
