= Prosto =

Polish clothing brand and record label

Prosto Label
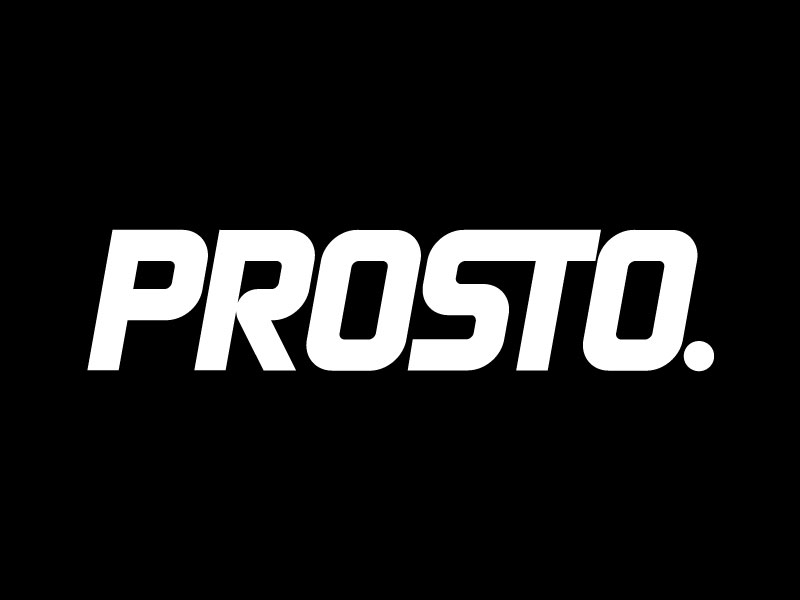
- Founded: 1999
- Founder: Wojciech "Sokół" Sosnowski
- Distributor: Firma Księgarska Jacek i Krzysztof Olesiejuk (POL)
- Genre: Hip Hop
- Country of origin: Poland
- Location: Warsaw
- Official website: www.prosto.pl

Prosto Wear
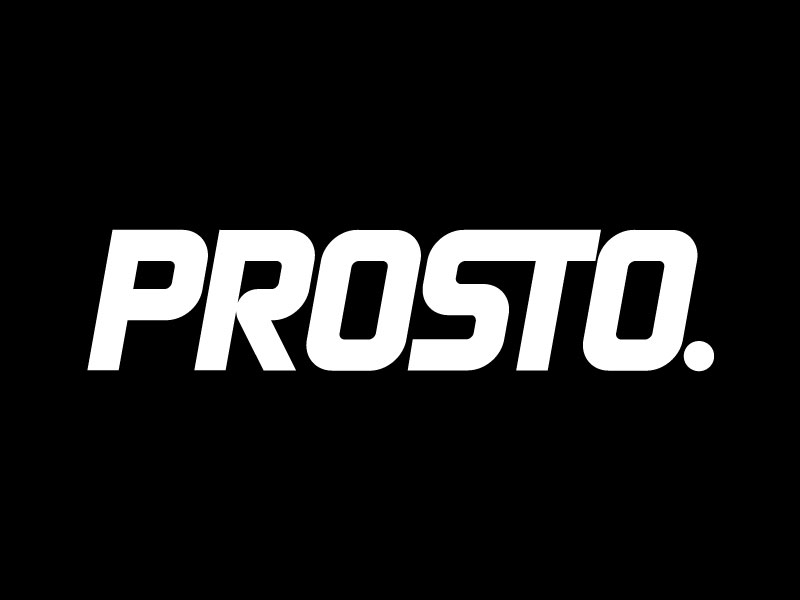
- Industry: Apparel
- Founded: 2003
- Headquarters: Warsaw, Poland
- Key people: Wojciech "Sokół" Sosnowski
- Products: Clothing, fashion accessories
- Website: www.prosto.pl

Prosto Sp. z o.o. is one of the largest Polish hip-hop record labels and clothing company. It was founded in 1999 in Warsaw by rapper Wojciech "Sokół" Sosnowski.

== History ==
The label released their first album Świeży materiał by Waco in 2001 in cooperation with BMG Poland. Next year Prosto released their first independent album Hołd by Pono, although it was distributed by other major label Warner Music. In 2005 Prosto signed a distribution deal with Fonografika. Since 2010 labels releases are distributed by Firma Księgarska Jacek i Krzysztof Olesiejuk.

As of 2014, Prosto released over fifty albums by such artists as VNM, Sokół & Marysia Starosta, Fundacja 1, Diox & The Returners, HiFi Banda, Małolat & Ajron, RaggaBangg and Potwierdzone Info among others. Label's other releases include compilation album Cuba Libre (2006), mixtapes Prosto Mixtape Deszczu Strugi (2006), Prosto Mixtape 600V (2010), Prosto Mixtape Kebs (2012), and fifteenth anniversary compilation Prosto XV (2014).

Prosto YouTube channel had (by January 2014) the biggest number of subscribers among Polish record labels. By 2013 label's channel was on third place in Poland with over 500,000 subscribers. In September 2014 ProstoTV had over 900,000 subscribers. By September 2018 ProstoTV have over 1,600,000 subscribers.

In 2003 label started their clothing division Prosto Wear with lines Elegancko, Klasyk, Label & Sport. Company products include pants, hats, T-shirts, underwear, bagpacks and fashion accessories. The company runs and owns online shop, and brand stores in Warsaw, Poznań, Lublin, Katowice and Sopot. Prosto Wear products are also distributed in over two hundred stores in Poland.

== Artists ==
=== Current ===
- Diox & The Returners (since 2011)
- The Returners (since 2012)
- Solar & Białas (since 2012)
- Obywatel MC (since 2013)
- KęKę (since 2013)
- Olsen & Fu (since 2013)
- HuczuHucz (since 2013)
- Małach & Rufuz (since 2013)
- Żyto (since 2013)
- Parzel & Siwers (since 2012)
- Fundacja 1 (since 2008)
- Sokół & Marysia Starosta (since 2009)
- ZIP Skład (since 2010)
- Fu (since 2006)
- Pokój Z Widokiem Na Wojnę (since 2006)
- RH- (since 2013)
- Diox (since 2013)
- 2sty (since 2014)
- PMM (since 2009)
- HiFi Banda (since 2010)
- VNM (since 2010)
- DwaZera (since 2011)
- Brahu (since 2010)
- SoDrumatic (since 2014)
- Official Vandal (since 2014)
- Czarny HIFI (since 2012)
- Hades (since 2011)
- KaeN (since 2012)
- Ńemy (since 2014)

=== Former ===
- Waco (2001–2006)
- WWO (2002–2006)
- Zipera (2003–2005)
- TPWC (2006–2009)
- Jędker (2006–2007)
- Dynam (2004–2005)
- EastWest Rockers (2008–2010)
- Gruba.Technika (2007–2009)
- Juras & Wigor (2004–2006)
- THS Klika (2006–2007)
- Pono (2002–2006)
- Małolat & Ajron (2004–2006)
- Mercedresu (2005–2007)
- DJ Tomekk & Toony (2010)
- Hemp Gru (2004–2007)
- Ras Luta (2009–2010)
- Endefis (2011–2013)
- RaggaBangg (2012–2013)
- Rozbójnik Alibaba (2012–2014)
- Popek (2012–2013)
- Potwierdzone Info (2013)
- W.E.N.A. & VNM (2014)
