= Dominique Hoppe =

French civil servant

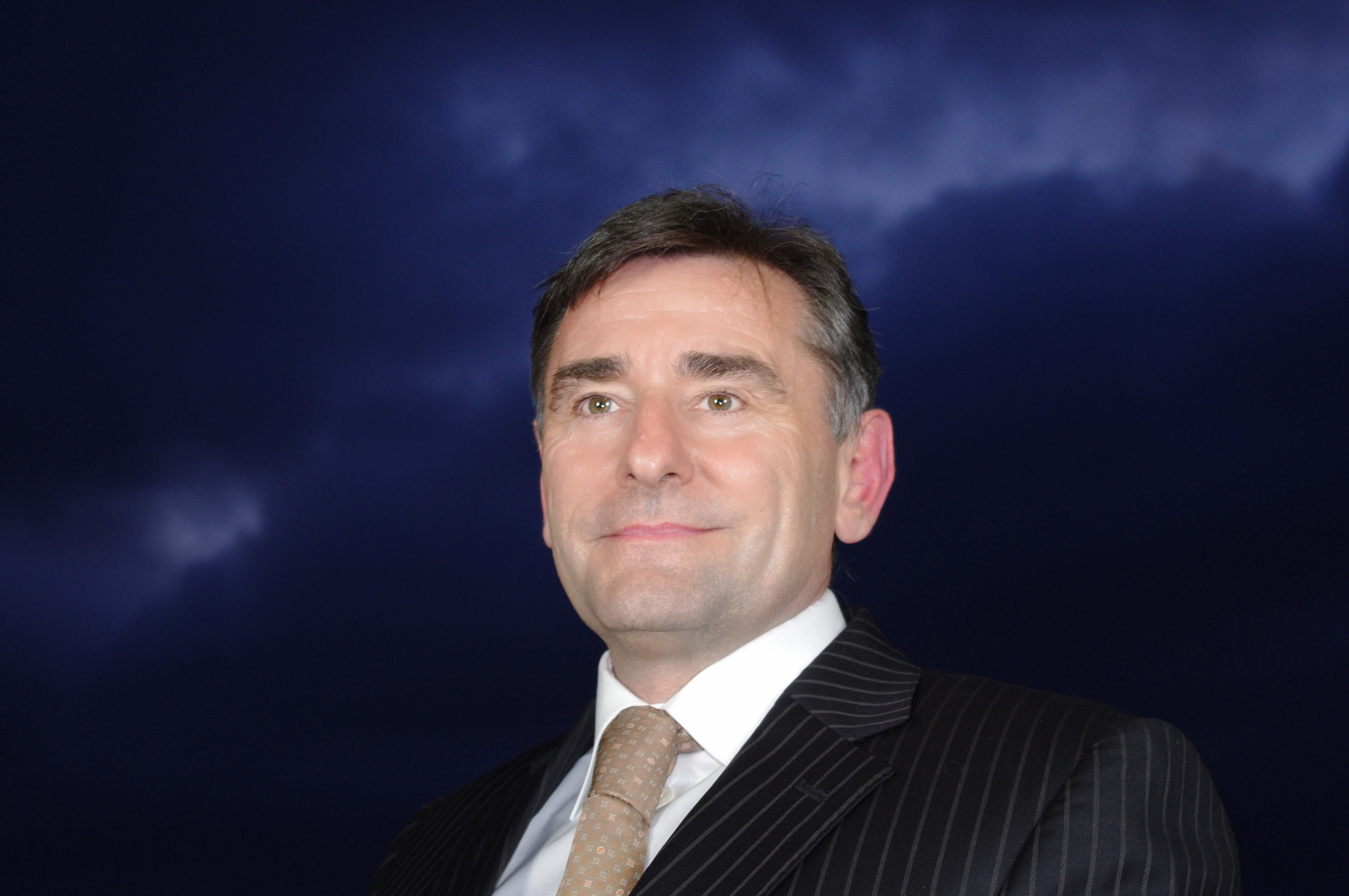

President of the Assemblée des francophones fonctionnaires des organisations internationales
- Incumbent
- Assumed office February 2007

Personal details
- Born: 24 November 1959 (age 66) Longwy, France
- Education: Institute of Political Studies, Paris; Stanford University; Harvard Business School

Francophone of the year 2011 with Abdou Diouf
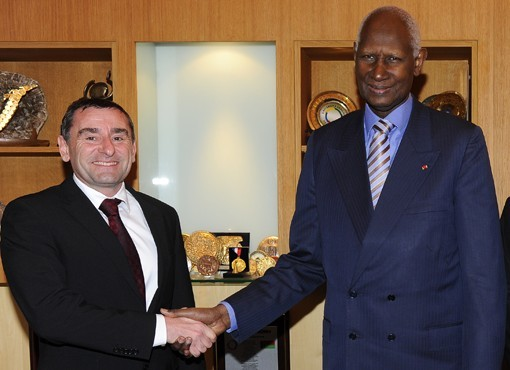

Speech Gusi Peace Prize laureate
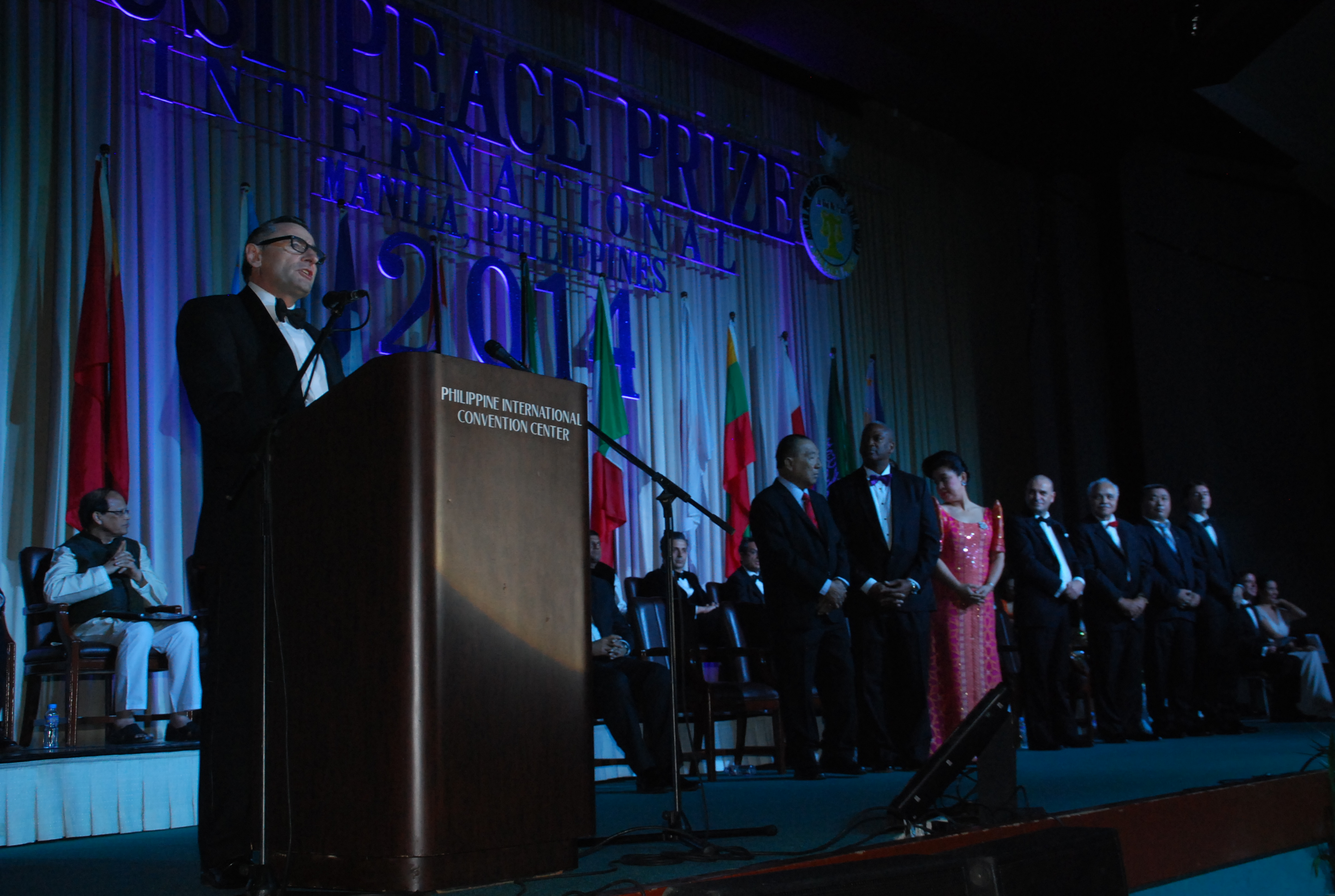

Military honor in Manilla
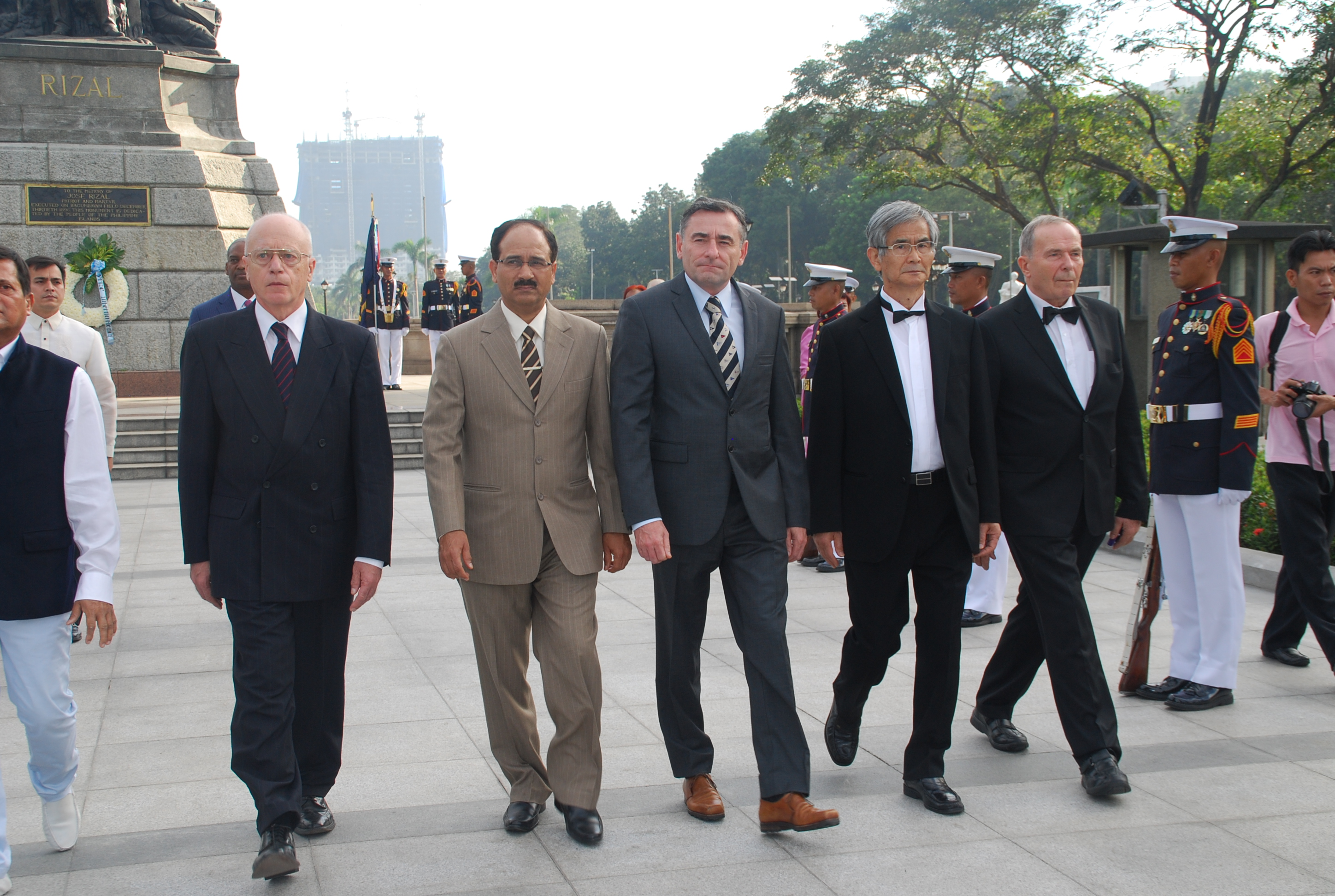

With President of Lithuania and American senator
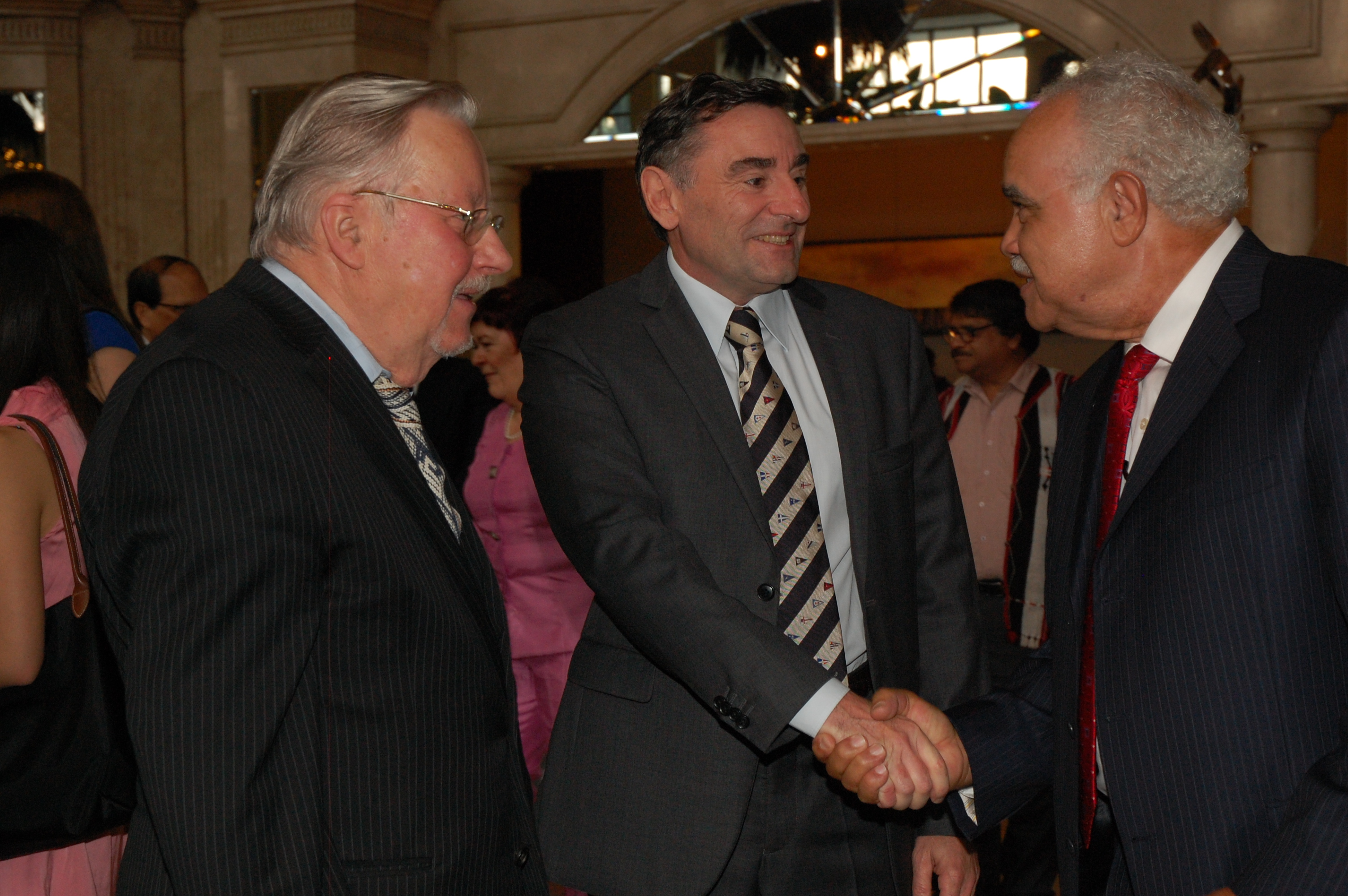

Dominique Hoppe (born 1959) is the current president of the Assemblée des francophones fonctionnaires des organisations internationales (AFFOI).

Prior to his appointment to the AFFOI, Hoppe was administrator at the European Patent Office, president of the AFIF-PB and president of the Superior Council of the international civil servants in the Netherlands.

In December 2011 he was elected – together with Abdou Diouf – francophone of the year in the framework the world forum of the French language.

In 2014 he received the Gusi Peace Prize - considered as the equivalent of the Nobel Peace Prize in Asia - for Peacebuilding thru development of political and diplomatic networks and activities supporting human rights and fundamental freedoms.

In 2015 he was nominated for the Nobel Peace Prize. His candidacy was supported by both the OPCW (Nobel Peace Prize 2013) and the CPI.

== Early life ==
Dominique Hoppe was born in 1959 in Longwy (France). He studied at the Lycée Alfred Mézières, went to the Nancy-Université and graduated from the Institut d'études politiques de Paris. He also graduated from the Stanford University and the Harvard Business School.

== Career ==
In 1984, he started his career as international civil servant at the European Patent Office. After an internal career at EPO, he became vice president of the AFIF-PB in 2000 and president in 2006. He was nominated president of the AFFOI in 2007 and President of the Superior council of international civil servants in 2008.

Under his presidency the AFFOI has published its manifesto for the support of linguistic, cultural and conceptual diversity within international organisations,; created the AFFOI for the youth,; launched the interviews of the AFFOI; and organised the Day of the French language in international organisations, events that happen when the head of states of the 77 countries of the official Francophonie meet, every second year.

In October 2012 he was invited as an expert at the Summit of Kinshasa where he presented a plan for diversity that was supported by many heads of international organizations including Irina Bokova, director-general of UNESCO, José Ángel Gurría, secretary general of the OECD, Pascal Lamy, director general of WTO, Ahmed Uzumcu, director general of OPCW, Michel Jarraud, secretary general of WWO, Philippe Couvreur, secretary general of ICJ and Benoit Battistelli, president of EPO. This plan opened new ways to defend diversity within multilateral environments.

In 2011 he mentioned for the first time the principal of "Anthropocracy" which he further defined in 2013. In October 2013 he launched the ACFOI and the AJFOI that became the two operators of the AFFOI under the umbrella of a broader body: AFFOImonde (AFFOIworld).

In June 2012 he made the closing speech of the 10th anniversary of the entry into force of the Rome Statute of the International Criminal Court. This speech has been described as both inspirational and visionary by Song Sang-hyun President of the ICC.

In 2013 he was associated -during the acceptance speech given by the director general of the OPCW - to the Nobel Peace Prize received by the organisation.

In 2016, worried by the increasing desire of self-governance of international institutions, he included "Sovereignty of States in both the governance and the management of International organizations" as a priority on the roadmap of the AFFOI.

== Other activities ==
He is member of Mensa since 1994. He gives conferences and courses on Management of multicultural environments at Harvard Business School and Sciences Po Paris and on the need of linguistic, cultural and conceptual diversity in the functioning of international organisations to a broad range of multilateral institutions (United Nations (UN), the International Court of Justice (ICJ), the International Criminal Court (ICC), the Organisation for the Prohibition of Chemical Weapons (OPCW), the European Space Agency (ESA), Europol and Eurojust, etc..). Dominique Hoppe also writes articles in the French press (e.g. Le Monde, le post, and technical reviews).

Dominique Hoppe is also Vice President of DLF, that is governed by the French academy and board member of several human rights related groups.

In 2014 he co-created – with the painter Christian Wind – the artistic movement "Vent et Esppoir" (Wind and Hoppe). Both artists adhere to this anti-elitist idea that artistic expression is a gift to all; a natural way to explore other states; a tool to express emotions. Inspired by the spirit of the Cobra movement, they decided to combine their talents, to mix, to cross and use the synergistic effect to explore slopes inaccessible to separated arts. The artist doesn't work towards a goal but to thrive. One comes back to oneself to better open to others. Perfection is no longer a goal but a possibility. The multidimensional representation of artistic expression resulting from this collaboration not only increases the flavor of the works, it also overcomes the artistic hermeticism that too often prevents free access to a non-expert public. Wind and Hoppe then becomes a political gesture, an attempt to democratize art.

In 2016 he published the book "Poètes du monde pour la langue française et la Francophonie" written by numerous poets coming from 53 different countries. The preface of this book was written by Abdou Diouf, former president of Senegal and Michaelle Jean, former president of Canada and current general secretary of OIF.
