= Anna Garwolinska =

Polish actress and politician

Anna Garwolińska (born July 1, 1965, in Warsaw) is a Polish actress, political figure, and former journalist with a background in cultural diplomacy and public affairs, with experience in the Polish, Israeli, and Japanese markets. She began her career in the 1980s as a stage and screen actress, appearing the films Żuraw i czapla (1985), Alchemik (1988), and Jeniec Europy (1989), while also performing at the Ochota Theatre.

She is an author of numerous publications and expert on image building and communication in politics and business. Anna Garwolińska is an advisor to ex-presidents: Mr. Aleksander Kwaśniewski and Mr. Bronisław Komorowski. She is a registered lobbyist with the Ministry of Interior and Administration. Anna also has served as the president and owner of Glaubicz Garwolińska Consultants since 1994. Since June 2024, she is a social assistant to Bogusław Wołoszański, Member of the Sejm of the Republic of Poland.

== Early life and education ==
Anna Garwolińska was born on July 1, 1965, in Warsaw to prof. Halina Garwolińska, MD, PhD, a member emeritus of the Polish Rheumatology Society (PTR), vice-chairwoman and secretary of the Society and President of the Warsaw Branch of the Society, vice-chairwoman of the Polish Society of Lung Diseases.

From 1976 to 1980, she was a member of "Gawęda," the representative Artistic Ensemble of the Polish Scouting Association named after Scoutmaster Barbara Kieruzalska, led by Andrzej Kieruzalski.

Garwolińska's passion is dancing, she participated in many dance competitions in the Pro-Am Show Dance category.

From 1980 to 1985, Anna studied at XLVII Edward Dembowski High School in Warsaw.

From 1981 to 1985, she performed at the Ochota Theatre.

In 1990, she graduated from the Leon Schiller National Higher School of Film, Television, and Theatre in Łódź (Acting and Direction of Photography Faculty). In 2005, Anna Garwolińska earned an MBA from the European University Campus in Warsaw. She is also a graduate of postgraduate studies at the Fryderyk Chopin University of Music in Warsaw (Theory and Composition Faculty).

Anna Garwolińska has completed specialized training in psychology, security, and reputation management. In 1998, she studied the Psychology of Conflict, Negotiation, and Mediation under Dr. Ned Kennan. She trained in Sociology and Group Influence (2005) and Influencing People (2006) with Robert B. Cialdini. In 2008, she attended Fundamentals of the Psychological Process – Characteristics and Counteracting International Terrorism at MLM Protection Israel, followed by General Security Service Training with Ofer Bar in 2009. In 2013, she completed Reputation Management Training and Cross-Cultural Crisis Management Training at Quadriga University of Applied Sciences Berlin.

== Career ==
Garwolińska began her professional career as an actress, including roles in Żuraw i czapla (1985), Alchemik (1988), and Jeniec Europy (1989). She also had guest roles in W labiryncie (1991) and portrayed characters in Szuler (1991) and Europejska noc (1993). At the same time, she worked as a journalist for TVP (Polish Television). Between 1990 and 1992, she was a reporter specializing in economic news, mainly covering privatization processes in Poland.

From 1992 to 1994, she served as an advisor to Janusz Lewandowski, Minister of Privatization, and as the spokesperson for the Ministry of Privatization. She also participated in negotiations regarding investment and social packages for privatized companies and prepared communication strategies for companies debuting on the Warsaw Stock Exchange.

In 1994, Garwolińska founded Glaubicz Garwolińska Consultants, one of the first PR companies in Poland, that specializes in crisis communication since 1998. Her clients included corporations PKP Intercity, Polfa Warszawa, Coca-Cola, Hitachi, Canon, Nestle, Unilever. She participated in individual trainings on influencing selected social groups led by Ned Kennan, an advisor in presidential campaigns and gubernatorial elections in the USA.

From 1999 to 2001, she worked on a campaign for the Spanish government promoting Spain outside the European Union. In 2000, Anna Garwolińska received a distinction in the FEEDBACK competition for the social campaign Drugs – Olej to, awarded by IMPACT marketing communications magazine.

Since 2002, she cooperates with the Shalom Foundation. In 2004, she cooperated with the Institute of Journalism of the Faculty of Journalism and Political Science of the University of Warsaw as part of the student internship program "The First Step into the Future". Between 2004 and 2005, she collaborated with Bingham McCutchen (London) on an interstate arbitration project. From 2005 to 2009, she was involved in a European Commission project related to health protection. From 2006 to 2008, she led the "HELP – For a life without tobacco" anti-smoking campaign for the European Commission as a partner of the B&S agency.

Anna Garwolińska committed to animal protection. Since 2003, she has been active in the Equus Humanitarae “Horse and Tradition” Foundation. She is the first woman polo rider after the war and co-founder of the Buksza Polo Association in Poland.

Between 2006 and 2012, she worked on an international cross-cultural communication project in Japan and Israel, promoting Israel in Japan and introducing Buddhism to Israel. In 2007, she earned a Golden Clips distinction in a PR competition for her work on the Agon Shu Buddhist School project. She was also a signatory of an agreement between Jerusalem and Hiroshima as "Cities Against Atomic Bombs." As part of the campaign, in 2008, Anna Garwolińska organized the first-ever Gomma ceremony on the Mount of Olives in collaboration with the Agon-Shu Buddhist Association of Japan.

At the same time, she was a finalist in the 2008 Businesswoman of the Year competition and received the audience award "Szminka Publiczności. Garwolińska led the first Buddhist-Shintoist Gomma ceremony on the Olive Hills in Jerusalem on September 10, 2008, as well as the first tribute in front of the Western Wall by Japanese Buddhist monks.

In 2009, she was again recognized with a GOLDEN CLIPS distinction in the Social Event category for the project Introducing Buddhism to Jerusalem – the Holy City of Christians, Jews, and Muslims. In 2010, she was a finalist in the 1st Edition of the Businesswoman of the Year Competition, organized by Radio PiN.

From 2009 to 2011, Garwolińska cooperated with the Israeli Ministry of Foreign Affairs in the field of intercultural communication and promotion of the idea of tolerance. At the same time, she took part in the Knesset campaign as an advisor to Tzipi Livni (Likus).

From 2009 to 2012, she was the owner, publisher and editor-in-chief of the bi-monthly "Place 4 Dance" - the first dance magazine on the Polish market - in cooperation with G+J.

From 2010 to 2012, Garwolińska represented Polish energy interests in Brussels, advocating for zero-emission platforms and CO_{2} reduction.

In 2010, Anna received the title of Honorary Resident of the City of Jerusalem from Mayor Uri Lupolianski.

From 2011 to 2012, she participated as an investor in the Polish 1st and second editions of "Dragons' Den – How to Become a Millionaire" in TV4 show.

In 2016, she was named one of the 25 Most Valuable Women in Poland by Gazeta Finansowa.

Since 2016, she partnered with the London Speaker Bureau representing former presidents and prime ministers.

In May 2017, Anna Garwolińska delivered a lecture and supported the student project Fund Your Future 2017, which focused on fundraising, capital acquisition, and business creation for students.

In 2022, she represented the Air Traffic Controllers’ Union in negotiations with the Polish Air Navigation Services Agency regarding the "return of a safety culture." At the same year, she became a representative of the Polish Angling Association in matters of the ecological disaster on the Odra River and negotiations with Polish Waters.

At the same year, Anna Garwolińska was a mentor in a program “Mam pomysł na start-up” under the initiative “Invest in Łódź”.

Since 2024, she has served as a plenipotentiary for Alfa/Wifama-Prexer. From June 2024, she serves as a social assistant to Bogusław Wołoszański, a Member of the Polish Parliament.

In December 2025, Anna Garwolinska received a medal from the Polish Angling Association (PZW) “Meritorious for Polish Angling Association”. PZW is the largest Polish (over 600 000 members) non-governmental organization operating for the protection of the environment.

On March 25, 2026, Garwolińska published her first book, a biography titled Ugryzł mnie skorpion i padł (A Scorpion Bit Me and Died), released by Purple Book Publishing.

=== Advisory activity ===
Garwolińska is the Vice President of the Association of Restructuring Practitioners and was affiliated with organizations like the International Association of Independent Marketing Consultants, Management Mastery Club Harvard Business Review Polska, Worldcom Public Relations Group, the Polish Business Roundtable, and the European Association of Communication Directors in Brussels. She served on several supervisory boards, including II NFI, Instal Rzeszów, and News 24 TV.
