= EMI Music Poland =

Polish record company; division of EMI Music

- Parent company: Warner Music Group
- Founded: 1995
- Defunct: 2013
- Genre: various
- Country of origin: Warsaw, Poland
- Location: Poland

EMI Music Poland Sp. z o.o., was a Polish subsidiary of EMI Group Limited, it was founded in 1995 in Warsaw. Labels CEO was Piotr Kabaj.

The label was founded in 1995 when EMI bought independent record label Kompania Muzyczna Pomaton (founded 1990). The purchase included rights for recordings by such artists as Tadeusz Woźniak, Jacek Wójcicki, Przemysław Gintrowski, Wolna Grupa Bukowina and Magda Umer among others.

In 2012 EMI was sold to Universal Music Group. The European Union required UMG to sell several owned labels to other parties, including Parlophone and EMI Music Poland, with Warner Music Group buying most of those labels in 2013. EMI Music Poland was then renamed Parlophone Music Poland. In 2014 Parlophone Music Poland was merged with Warner Music Poland.

In early 2000s EMI Music Poland run hip-hop subsidiary Baza Lebel [sic] with such artists as Mor W.A., Molesta Ewenement, Zipera, Electric Rudeboyz, Vienio & Pele, Peel Motyff and Pare Słów among others.

Label over the years distributed in Poland albums released by My Music, Lemon Records, Kayax, and labels from parent company EMI Group Limited among others.

== Selected artists ==
- Agnieszka Chylińska
- Anita Lipnicka
- Aleksandra Jabłonka
- Bajm
- Blue Café
- Dżem
- Edyta Górniak
- Elektryczne Gitary
- Feel
- Goya
- Grzegorz Ciechowski
- Grzegorz Turnau
- Grzegorz Markowski & Ryszard Sygitowicz
- Iwona Węgrowska
- Iza Lach
- Justyna Steczkowska
- Katarzyna Klich
- Kasia Stankiewicz
- Kroke
- Lidia Kopania
- Madox
- Marika
- Marysia Starosta
- Mela Koteluk
- Monika Kuszyńska
- Myslovitz
- My Riot
- Natalia Lesz
- Patrycja Kosiarkiewicz
- Pati Yang
- Patrycja Markowska
- Perfect
- Piotr Rubik
- Ryszard Rynkowski
- Stare Dobre Małżeństwo
- T.Love
- Video
- Wilki
- Voo Voo
- Wojciech Waglewski

== See also ==
- BMG Poland
- PolyGram Poland
- Sony Music Entertainment Poland
- Sony BMG Music Entertainment Poland
- Universal Music Poland
- Warner Music Poland
