= Pezet =

Polish rapper (born 1980)

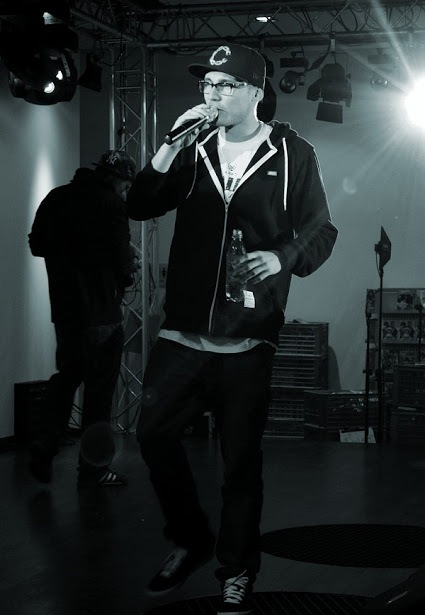
- Pezet in 2013

Background information
- Born: Jan Paweł Kapliński; April 18, 1980 (age 46); Warsaw, Poland
- Genre: Hip-hop
- Occupations: Rapper, songwriter
- Years active: 1998–present
- Labels: Konkret Promo, DobreZiomy, Embargo Nagrania, R.R.X., Asfalt Records, T1-Teraz
- Formerly of: Płomień 81

For the French politician, see Michel Pezet.

Jan Paweł Kapliński (Polish pronunciation: [ˈpavɛw kaˈpliɲskʲi], born April 18, 1980), better known by his stage name Pezet (Polish pronunciation: [ˈpɛzɛt]), is a Polish rapper. In 1998, he debuted with Onar in Płomień 81 and they released three albums. He started working with Noon in 2002, publishing two albums. Five years later in 2007 his first solo album hit the stores.

Pezet hosted the program Rap Fura on Viva. He also had an episode in a crime drama television series called Kryminalni on TVN. Paweł has a brother who is also a rapper, better known as Małolat.

== Discography ==
Title	Album details	Peak chart positions	Sales	Certifications
Title	Album details	POL	Sales	Certifications
Muzyka Klasyczna (with Noon)	Released: April 8, 2002; Label: T1-Teraz; Formats: CD, vinyl	10	POL: 20,000	
Muzyka Poważna (with Noon)	Released: April 26, 2004; Label: EmbargoNagrania; Formats: CD, vinyl	3	POL: 10,000	
Muzyka Rozrywkowa	Released: October 15, 2007; Label: Konkret Promo; Formats: CD, vinyl, digital download	5		
Muzyka Emocjonalna	Released: June 2, 2009; Label: Future Mind; Formats: CD	—		
Dziś w moim mieście (with Małolat)	Released: October 2, 2010; Label: Koka Beats, Fonografika; Formats: CD, vinyl, digital download	5		ZPAV: Gold
Live in 1500m2 (with Małolat)	Released: June 5, 2012; Label: Koka Beats, EMI; Formats: CD, digital download	—		
Radio Pezet	Released: September 4, 2012; Label: Koka Beats, EMI; Formats: CD, digital download	2		ZPAV: Gold
Muzyka współczesna	Released: September 27, 2019; Label: Pezet; Formats: CD, vinyl, digital download	1		ZPAV: 3× Platinum
Muzyka komercyjna	Released: September 30, 2022; Label: Pezet; Formats: CD, vinyl, digital download	—		ZPAV: Platinum
"—" position was not noted.

== Awards and nominations ==
=== Berlin Music Video Awards ===
The Berlin Music Video Awards is an international festival that promotes the art of music videos.

Year	Nominated work	Award	Result	Ref.
2026	"Presja środowiska"	Best Narrative	Nominated	
