= Wit Dąbal =

Polish cinematographer

- Born: 26 September 1955 (age 70); Tarnowskie Góry, Poland
- Education: Łódź Film School
- Occupation: Cinematographer
- Children: Michał Dąbal

Wit Dąbal (born 26 September 1955) is a Polish cinematographer.

== Life and work ==
A graduate of the cinematography department of the Łódź Film School, Dąbal is winner of numerous film awards and distinctions, including the Cinematography Awards at the Polish Film Festival in 1984 for the film entitled "Wir" and Prix Italia in the category of TV programs for the picture entitled "From Moscow to Pietuszek with Vieniedikt Yerofeyev" (Z Moskwy do Pietuszek z Wieniediktem Jerofiejewem).

== Filmography ==
- 1995 – Wielki tydzień
- 1992 – Sauna
- 1990 – Z Moskwy do Pietuszek z Wieniediktem Jerofiejewem
- 1988 – Alchemik
- 1986 – Cudowne dziecko
- 1985 – Medium
- 1983 – Kartka z podróży
- 1981 – Wahadełko

== Awards and distinctions ==
- 1983 – Złote Grono Award for cinematography for the film "Kartka z podróży" at the Lubuskie Film Summer Festival)
- 1984 – Cinematography Award at the Polish Film Festival
- 1985 – Nagroda Artystyczna Młodych im. Stanisława Wyspiańskiego (Stanisław Wyspiański's Youth Art Award) II degree for achievements in the field of cinematography presented in "Kartka z podróży" and "Wir")
- 1995 – Award ("Tytan" Award for cinematography for the "EB" commercial film at the "Crackfilm" Advertising Film Festival in Kraków)
- 1998 – Award (Cinematography Award for the "Mobil 1" commercial at the "Creatura" Warsaw Advertising Festival)

== Personal life ==
He is a father of the film operator and music producer Michał Dąbal.
