= Buxton School, Leytonstone =

Buxton

Location
- Cann Hall Road; Leytonstone, Greater London, E11 3NN; England; 51.5583°N 0.0137°E

Information
- Type: Foundation school
- Local authority: Waltham Forest
- Department for Education URN: 103080 Tables
- Ofsted: Reports
- Executive Headteacher: Jackie Bowers-Broadbent
- Gender: Mixed
- Age: 3 to 16
- Enrolment: 1,528 as of November 2015
- Website: http://www.buxtonschool.org.uk/

Buxton School (formerly Cann Hall Primary School and Tom Hood School) is a mixed all-through school located in Leytonstone, London, England.

The school was formed on 1 January 2010 from an amalgamation of Cann Hall Primary School and Tom Hood School. It currently educates pupils aged 3 to 16.

== Notable former pupils ==
=== Tom Hood School ===
- Bobby Moore, Former England Soccer Captain during the 1966 World Cup Win, and West Ham player
- Plan B, Rapper
- Chronik, Grime Artist, professional booters
- Dawn Butler, Member of Parliament
- Eric Stephenson, England and Leeds United footballer; killed in action, 1944.
- David Johnston OBE, Member of Parliament, Minister for Children, Families and Wellbing
- Matthew Xia, Olivier Award winning theatre director and former DJ
- Graham Gooch, Former England and Essex cricket captain (attended Cann Hall)
