= DemoCrisis =

- Formation: 11 October 2023; 2 years ago
- Founder: Dan Sobovitz
- Founded at: Brussels
- Purpose: Pro-Europeanism, Democracy, anti-populism
- Fields: Civil society movement
- Website: https://demo-crisis.eu/

The Democrisis Action Network (DemoCrisis) is a collaborative platform and international political movement initially established in response to what was identified as growing challenges posed by democratic backsliding and nationalistic populism in Europe. The project intends to operate internationally, sharing best practices and encouraging solidarity to protect liberal democracy. It has garnered support from four European parties. Closely associated with the Israeli think tank Mitvim, it gathers Israeli, Polish and Hungarian personalities, allegedly "pro-democracy", and whose political ideology is openly pro-Europeanist.

== Conception and launch ==
The conception of DemoCrisis arose from a meeting between European Parliament members and leaders of the Israeli protest movement in the summer of 2022, organised by founder Dan Sobovitz. At the same time, the Mitvim Institute initiated the "Liberal Partnership", which followed its research project on "Democratic Backsliding and Securitization: Challenges for Israel, the EU and Israel-Europe Relations". This research focused on what is described as illiberal trends and democratic backsliding in both Europe and Israel. The Liberal Partnership then moved from the field of research to learn from peers and colleagues in Turkey and the Czech Republic; joining forces with Dan Sobowitz, the Mitvim Institute contributed to the establishment of DemoCrisis.

The platform officially launched in October 2023 with a solidarity march in Brussels, before a conference within the European Parliament. Two ex-Vice Presidents of the European Parliament, Marc Angel and Othmar Karas, were participants at the conference, and ex-Polish President and Nobel peace prize winner Lech Wałęsa recorded a video message in support of the mission. This gathering was supported by like-minded international organisations from Israel, Hungary and Poland. The original aim of the organisation "was to link the Israeli government’s attempted judicial overhaul to efforts by PiS in Poland and Fidesz in Hungary." according to Sarah Wheaton of Politico.
