= Assemblée des francophones fonctionnaires des organisations internationales =

Global network of French-speaking international civil servants

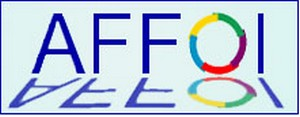
- Formation: 21 March 2007
- Purpose: Global network of French-speaking international civil servants
- Headquarters: (Netherlands) Rijswijk
- Official language: French
- President: (France) Dominique Hoppe (since 2007)
- Website: www.affoimonde.org

The Assemblée des francophones fonctionnaires des organisations internationales (AFFOI), French for the Assembly of French-Speaking International Civil Servants, is a global network of French-speaking international civil servants.

The Assembly was founded in The Hague in 2007 by representatives of the United Nations (UN), the International Court of Justice (ICJ), the International Criminal Court (ICC), the Organisation for the Prohibition of Chemical Weapons (OPCW), the European Space Agency (ESA), Europol and Eurojust, it is now represented in 57 international organisations.

The objective of the AFFOI is to defend linguistic, cultural and conceptual diversity in the functioning of international organisations.

The AFFOI has offices in cities with high density of international organisations -The Hague, New York City, Washington, Geneva, Luxembourg, Brussels, Addis Ababa. Its headquarters are located in The Hague, Netherlands.

== History ==
The Convention which created the Assembly of French speaking international civil servants was signed on 21 March 2007 by Judge Bruno Cotte from the ICC, Judge Ronny Abraham from the ICJ, Patrice Palanque, Director at OIAC, Dominique Hoppe, President of AFIF-PB, Michel Quillé, Director of Europol, Gérard Loubens, General Prosecutor at Eurojust, and Jean Jacques Dordain, General Secretary of ESA.

Between 2007 and 2010, the Assembly progressively extended to almost all international organisations implemented in Europe.

Beginning 2011 the AFFOI has published its manifesto, and created the "AFFOI for the youth". a special unit that supports French speaking new graduates who want to work for an international organisation. In February 2011, the AFFOI became the fifth official operator of francophonie. next to TV5 MONDE, Université Senghor, the Agence universitaire de la Francophonie and the Association internationale des maires francophones. It is also the representative of the Assemblée parlementaire de la Francophonie (APF), for all matters related to international organisations.

== Worldwide ==
- The AFFOI's headquarters are in the Hague. Regional offices have been established in Paris, New York, Brussels, Washington, Luxembourg, Geneva, Addis Ababa and Montreal.
