= Jędker =

- Also known as: Jędker, Jędker Realista
- Born: Andrzej Wawrynkiewicz; 1977 (age 48–49)
- Origin: Warsaw, Poland
- Genre: Hip hop
- Occupation: Rapper
- Instrument: Vocals
- Years active: 1996–present
- Label: Prosto Records
- Website: http://www.prosto.pl
- Relatives: Michał Wawrykiewicz (brother)

Jędker (Polish pronunciation: [ˈjɛntker]), real name Andrzej Wawrykiewicz (Polish pronunciation: [ˈandʑɛj vavrɨnˈkʲiɛvit͡ʂ]), is a rapper from Warsaw, Poland. Member of ZIP Skład (Ziomki i Przyjaciele) and WWO (W Witrynach Odbicia, W Wyjątkowych Okolicznościach), together with DJ Deszczu Strugi, and Sokół. He is the brother of politician Michał Wawrykiewicz.

== Discography ==
- 1999 ZIP Skład – Chleb Powszedni
- 2000 W Witrynach Odbicia – Masz I Pomyśl
- 2002 W Wyjątkowych Okolicznościach – We własnej osobie
- 2005 W Wyjątkowych Okolicznościach – Witam Was w Rzeczywistości
- 2005 W Witrynach Odbicia – Życie na kredycie
- 2007 Jędker Realista – Czas Na Prawdę POL #28
- 2010 Monopol - Remixed In Poland

=== Singles ===
- 2007 Jędker Realista – Rewers
