= Hades (rapper) =

Polish rapper (born 1985)

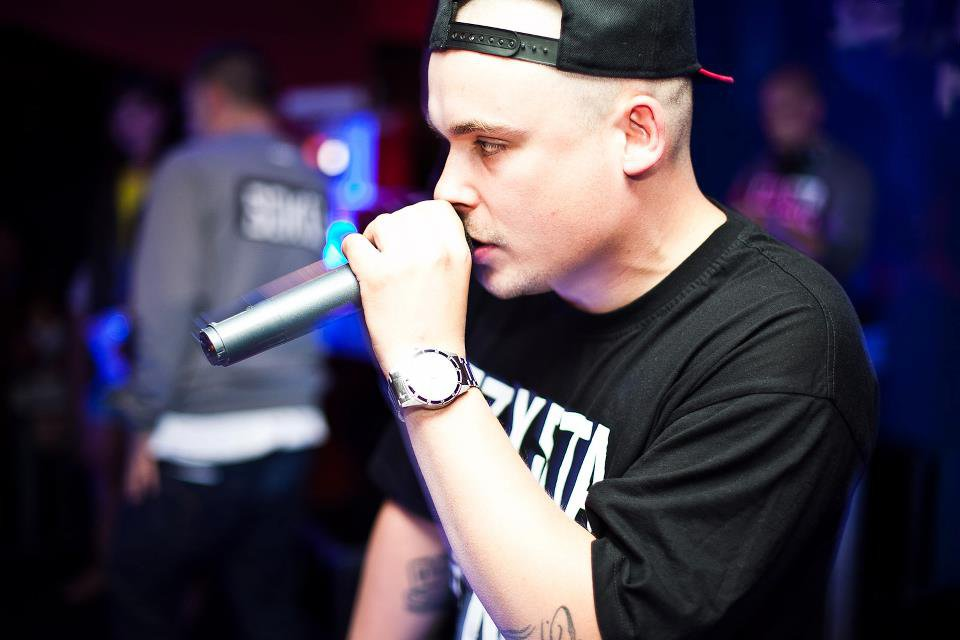
- Hades in 2012

Background information
- Also known as: Hades, Had, JiHad, Hamas, Had Hades, HDS
- Born: Łukasz Bułat-Mironowicz; 16 August 1985 (age 41)
- Origin: Poland
- Genre: Hip hop
- Occupation: Rapper
- Instrument: Vocals
- Labels: Prosto, Asfalt Records

Łukasz Bułat-Mironowicz (born 16 August 1985), better known by his stage name Hades, is a Polish rapper. He is also a member of bands HiFi Banda and RH-.

== Discography ==
=== Studio albums ===
Title	Album details	Peak chart positions	Sales	Certifications
Title	Album details	POL	Sales	Certifications
Nowe dobro to zło	Released: 17 October 2011; Label: Prosto; Formats: CD, digital download	20		
Haos (with O.S.T.R.)	Released: 26 February 2013; Label: Asfalt Records; Formats: CD, digital download	1	POL: 30,000+	POL: Platinum
Czasoprzestrzeń	Released: 5 December 2014; Label: Prosto; Formats: CD	—		
"—" denotes a recording that did not chart or was not released in that territory.

=== Music videos ===
Year	Title	Directed	Album	Ref.
2011	"Na ulicy"	—	Nowe dobro to zło	
2011	"Kurz"	100gram Videos	Nowe dobro to zło	
2011	"Nowe dobro to zło"	R5Films	Nowe dobro to zło	
2012	"Brudny funk"	Letemknow	Nowe dobro to zło	
2012	"Dwie dłonie"	Roton Studio	Nowe dobro to zło	
2012	"Zmiany"	Florian Malak	Nowe dobro to zło	
2012	"600 dni" (with O.S.T.R.)	Blue Box Media	non-album single	
2013	"Czas dużych przemian" (with O.S.T.R.)	Marek Skrzecz	Haos	
2013	"Stary Nowy Jork" (with O.S.T.R.; featuring: Jordanów)	Kapewu	Haos	
2013	"Obsesja" (with O.S.T.R.)	Projekt Borusk, Jakub Drobczyński	Haos	
2013	"Ona i ja" (with O.S.T.R.)	Toczy Videos	Haos	
2013	"Mniej więcej" (with O.S.T.R.)	Andrzej Rajkowski	Haos	
2013	"Powstrzymać cię" (with O.S.T.R.)	—	Haos	
