= Maria Seweryn =

Polish actress

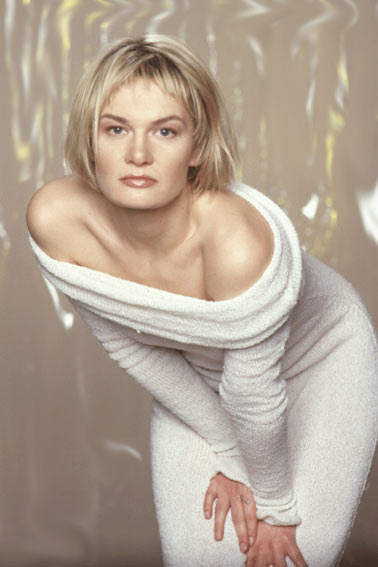
- Seweryn in 2008
- Born: 25 March 1975 (age 51); Warsaw, Poland
- Occupation: Actress
- Years active: 1980–present

Maria Seweryn (born 25 March 1975) is a Polish actress. She appeared in more than ten films since 1980. Seweryn is the daughter of actors Krystyna Janda and Andrzej Seweryn.

== Selected filmography ==
Year	Title	Role	Notes
1980	The Orchestra Conductor	Marysia	
1995	Holy Week	Marta	
2002	Julie Walking Home		
