= Chronik =

British grime artist

- Born: 3 May 1981 (age 45); Maryland, East London, England
- Genres: Grime
- Occupations: Rapper, Songwriter, Booters, Grave Digger, Bines Collector
- Years active: 2004–present
- Member of: Slew Dem Crew
- Website: twitter.com/Darealchronik

Chronik (born 3 May 1981), is a grime MC from Maryland, east London. Active in underground music for a number of years, he has released two solo mixtapes; Blaze More Dan U (2007) and Free Chronik (2011). He released his first album, Rise of the Lengman in 2014. He is known for his underground hit Ring, variously released in Free Chronik and Rise of the Lengman. Chronik is a member of the underground grime group Slew Dem crew along with Tempa T, G-Man and the now deceased Esco "Big Bars".

== Biography ==
Born in 1981 to parents from the West Indies, Chronik attended Tom Hood School (latterly Buxton School) for his secondary education. He is a practising Sunni Muslim. Chronik served a short sentence in prison, with colleagues such as Tempa T calling for his release. Chronik has been described as a legend in the grime scene, alongside the likes of Wiley. Since 2012 collaborates with the label WagWan and its representative, Polish rapper Popek.
