= Sokół (rapper) =

Polish rapper (born 1977)

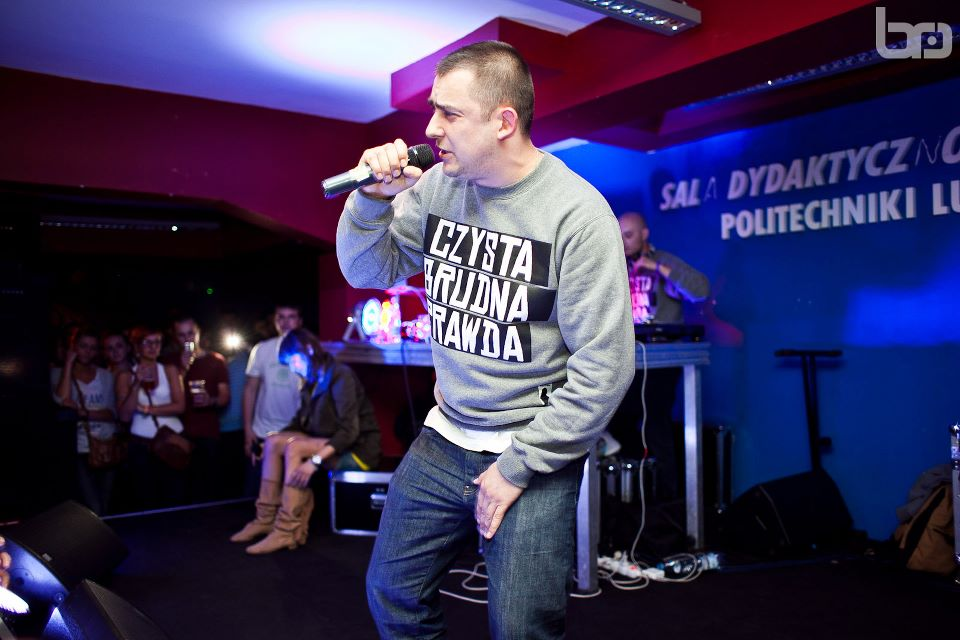
- Sokół in 2013

Background information
- Born: Wojciech Sosnowski; 11 March 1977 (age 49); Warsaw, Poland
- Genre: Hip-hop
- Occupations: Rapper; MC; entrepreneur
- Years active: 1996–present
- Label: Prosto
- Website: www.wojteksokol.com

Wojciech Sosnowski (IPA: [ˈvɔjt͡ɕɛx sɔsˈnɔfskʲi]; born March 11, 1977, in Warsaw, Poland), known professionally as Sokół (Polish pronunciation: [ˈsɔkuw]), is a Polish rapper and MC. Since his debut show and the first track on an album with DJ 600V in 1997, he has released 13 studio albums with various music projects, such as ZIP Skład (1999), WWO (2000–2005; one of them went double platinum, and two others sold gold), Sokół i Marysia Starosta (both platinum; 2011, 2013), and Sokół featuring Pono (2007–2009; two gold).

His albums and singles have achieved 24 platinum and several gold record awards.

He lives in Poland, but has also resided in the Czech Republic, Latvia, and Georgia for over three years. Esteemed for his texts and thoroughgoing rap, he is also founder and co-owner of the Prosto record label and clothing company.

== Discography ==
=== Studio albums ===
Title	Album details	Peak chart positions	Certifications
Title	Album details	POL	Certifications
Teraz pieniądz w cenie (with Pono)	Released: December 14, 2007; Label: Prosto; Formats: CD, digital download	10	POL: Gold
Ty przecież wiesz co (with Pono)	Released: December 20, 2008; Label: Prosto; Formats: CD, digital download	10	POL: Gold
Czysta brudna prawda (with Marysia Starosta)	Released: May 16, 2011; Label: Prosto; Formats: CD, LP, digital download	4	POL: Platinum
Czarna biała magia (with Marysia Starosta)	Released: December 13, 2013; Label: Prosto; Formats: CD, LP, digital download	1	POL: Platinum
Wojtek Sokół	Released: February 15, 2019; Label: Prosto; Formats: CD, LP, digital download	1	POL: 3 × Platinum
NIC	Released: November 19, 2021; Label: Prosto; Formats: CD, LP, digital download	1	POL: 2 × Platinum
"—" denotes a recording that did not chart or was not released in that territory.

=== Music videos ===
Year	Title	Director	Album
2011	"Sztruks" (with Marysia Starosta)	Kuba Dąbrowski	Czysta brudna prawda
2011	"Reset" (with Marysia Starosta)	Wal&Gura, Kuba Łubniewski	Czysta brudna prawda
2012	"Myśl pozytywnie" (with Marysia Starosta)	Wal&Gura, Kuba Łubniewski	Czysta brudna prawda
2012	"W sercu" (with Marysia Starosta)	Wal&Gura	Czysta brudna prawda
2013	"Wyblakłe myśli" (with Marysia Starosta)	Maciek Szupica, Wal&Gura	Czarna biała magia
2014	"Zepsute miasto" (with Marysia Starosta)	Jakub Radej	Czarna biała magia
2018	"Chcemy być wyżej" [Projekt Tymczasem]	Szymon Pawlik / Nest Warsaw	—

=== Guest appearances ===
Year	Album	Track
1998	DJ 600V – Produkcja hip-hop	"Pamiętaj o melanżu" (featuring: Włodi, Fu, Sokół, Jaźwa)
2000	Zipera – O.N.F.R.	"Sztuczna twarz" (featuring: Sokół)
2000	Mor W.A. – Te słowa mówią wszystko	"Idź za ciosem" (featuring: Młody Łyskacz, Sokół, Włodi, Fu)
2001	Eldo – Opowieść o tym, co tu dzieje się naprawdę	"Numerki" (featuring: Sokół)
2002	Fu – Futurum	"Mój projekt, moje życie" (featuring: Sokół)
2002	Pono – Hołd	"Hołd" (featuring: Sokół)
2002	WSP – Wspólnicy	"Zarobek" (featuring: Sokół)
2002	Vienio, Pele – Autentyk	"Znów" (featuring: Sokół)
2003	Emade – Album producencki	"Dam ci przeżyć" (featuring: Sokół)
2003	15 Minut Projekt – 15 Minut Projekt	"Najdłuższy chillout w mieście" (featuring: Sokół, Anna Szarmach)
2004	Hemp Gru – Klucz	"Poza kontrolą" (featuring: Sokół)
2004	Analogia – Esencja czysta	"Byłem pewien" (featuring: Peja, Sokół, Fu)
2005	Slums Attack – Najlepszą obroną jest atak	"Reprezentuję biedę" (featuring: Sokół)
2005	Małolat, Ajron – W pogoni za lepszej jakości życiem	"Sąsiedzi" (featuring: Ero, Sokół)
2006	Bez Cenzury – Klasyk	"Reprezentuję siebie" (featuring: JWP Maffia, THS Klika, JurasWigor, Sokół, Jacenty, Lui, Hemp Gru, Ko1Fu, Pyskaty, Yogi)
2006	THS Klika – Liryka chodnika	"Ślepy zaułek" (featuring: Sokół)
2007	Fu – Krew i dusza	"Imperium zła" (featuring: Rocca, Sokół, Olsen)
2007	Bosski Roman, Piero – Krak	"Na 100%" (featuring: Sokół, Tadek); "Kto twoim Bogiem?" (featuring: Sokół)
2007	WhiteHouse – Kodex 3: Wyrok	"Oni mogliby" (featuring: Sokół)
2008	Projektanci – Braterstwo krwi	"Pomocna dłoń" (featuring: Sobota, Sokół)
2008	Oxy.gen – Dziewczyny	"Angela (Gdybym wiedział, że istniejesz)" (featuring: Sokół)
2008	Popek – HeavyWeight	"Już mnie nie zobaczysz" (featuring: Sokół)
2008	Bezimienni – Walka	"Mógłbym Ci opowiedzieć" (featuring: Sokół)
2008	Komplex – Dosadno u raju	"Bolji svet" (featuring: Sokół)
2009	WhiteHouse – Poeci	"Niech nikt nad grobem mi nie płacze" (Stanisław Wyspiański) (featuring: Sokół)
2009	Robert M – TAxi	"Chciałbym tu" (featuring: Sokół)
2010	Toony, DJ Tomekk – Ehrenkodex	"Może kiedyś" (featuring: Sokół)
2010	Pokój z Widokiem na Wojnę – 2010	"Wojna o pokój" (featuring: Sokół); "Ramię w ramię" (featuring: Sokół)
2010	HiFi Banda – 23:55	"Dobra droga" (featuring: Sokół); "Nie śpię" (featuring: Sokół)
2011	Chada – WGW	"Ferment" (featuring: Sokół, Brahu); "Ferment" (L Pro Remix) (featuring: Sokół, Enoiks)
2011	L.U.C – Kosmostumostów	"Pospolite ruszenie" (featuring: Sokół)
2011	PMM – Poza horyzont	"Rwany rytm" (featuring: Sokół)
2011	C.Z.S.T. – Moment rozliczenia	"Wizerunek" (featuring: Sokół)
2011	Pokój z Widokiem na Wojnę – Droga wojownika	"Moja pierwsza dziewczyna – Remix 1" (featuring: Sokół)
2011	Zarys Zdarzeń – 2011	"Kilkaset słów" (featuring: Sokół, Martita)
2011	Bezimienni – Co mnie nie zabije to mnie wzmocni	"Kiedyś byłem głuchy" (featuring: Sokół)
2012	Chada – Jeden z Was	"Jeden z Was" (featuring: Sokół, Kay)
2012	Bosski Roman – Krak 4	"Czym jest sukces?" (featuring: Sokół i Marysia Starosta)
2012	WhiteHouse – Kodex 4	"Do jutra" (featuring: VNM, Sokół, Hades)
2012	Parzel, Siwers – Coś się kończy, coś się zaczyna	"Nie powiem Ci jak żyć" (featuring: Sokół)
2012	Donatan – Równonoc. Słowiańska dusza	"Z samym sobą" (featuring: Sokół)
2013	Popek – Monster	Kto nie ryzykuje ten szampana nie pije
2014	Popek – Monster 2	Mad House

== Awards and nominations ==
Award Ceremony	Year	Nominee/Work	Category	Result
Berlin Music Video Awards	2024	"Miłość zawsze jest"	Best Concept	Nominated
