= Marysia Starosta =

Polish singer (born 1981)

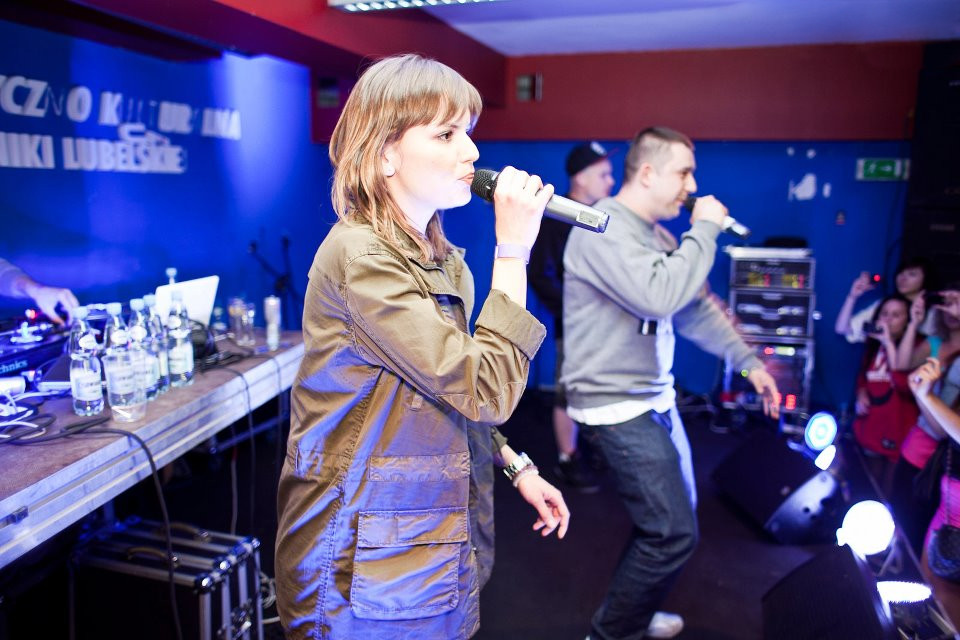
- Marysia Starosta in 2012

Background information
- Born: 19 March 1981 (age 45); Warsaw, Poland
- Genres: Pop, R&B, hip hop
- Occupation: Singer
- Labels: EMI Music Poland, Prosto

Marysia Starosta (born 19 March 1981 in Warsaw), is a Polish singer. Her debut album titled Maryland was released on November 24, 2008 by EMI Music Poland. From 2011 she worked with her former partner, rapper Sokół with whom she released two albums, both certified Platinum in Poland.

== Discography ==
=== Studio albums ===
Title	Album details	Peak chart positions	Sales	Certifications
Title	Album details	POL	Sales	Certifications
Maryland	Released: November 24, 2008; Label: EMI Music Poland; Formats: CD	—		
Czysta brudna prawda (with Sokół)	Released: May 16, 2011; Label: Prosto; Formats: CD, digital download	4	POL: 30,000+	POL: Platinum
Czarna biała magia (with Sokół)	Released: December 13, 2013; Label: Prosto; Formats: CD, digital download	1	POL: 30,000+	POL: Platinum
"—" denotes a recording that did not chart or was not released in that territory.

=== Music videos ===
Year	Title	Directed	Album
2008	"Nie ma nas"	—	Maryland
2011	"Sztruks" (with Sokół)	Kuba Dąbrowski	Czysta brudna prawda
2011	"Reset" (with Sokół)	Wal&Gura, Kuba Łubniewski	Czysta brudna prawda
2012	"Myśl pozytywnie" (with Sokół)	Wal&Gura, Kuba Łubniewski	Czysta brudna prawda
2012	"W sercu" (with Sokół)	Wal&Gura	Czysta brudna prawda
2013	"Wyblakłe myśli" (with Sokół)	Maciek Szupica, Wal&Gura	Czarna biała magia
2014	"Zepsute miasto" (with Sokół)	Jakub Radej	Czarna biała magia
