= Eric Stephenson =

English footballer

Personal information
- Full name: Joseph Eric Stephenson
- Date of birth: 17 September 1914
- Place of birth: Bexleyheath, England
- Date of death: 8 September 1944 (aged 29)
- Place of death: British Burma
- Position: Inside left

Youth career
- 1933–1935: Leeds United

Senior career*
Years	Team	Apps	(Gls)
1935–1941	Leeds United	111	(21)
1939–1941	→ Leeds United (war)	32	(7)
Total		143	(28)

International career
1938	England	2	(0)
- * Club domestic league appearances and goals

Joseph Eric Stephenson (17 September 1914 – 8 September 1944) was an English footballer who played as an inside left at both professional and international levels.

== Career ==
Born in Bexleyheath, he attended Tom Hood School in Leytonstone, from where in 1930 he represented London Schoolboys in their annual match against Glasgow Schoolboys at Hampden Park. Stephenson signed for Leeds United in 1933, turned professional in 1934, and made his first-team debut in 1935.

Stephenson also earned two international caps for England in 1938.

== War service ==
He left Leeds in 1941 to serve in the Second World War. On 4 April 1942, he was commissioned as a second lieutenant in the Indian Army. He would go on to become a major in the Gurkha Rifles. He died in active service in British Burma in September 1944 and is buried at Taukkyan War Cemetery, Myanmar. His younger brother Ernest had died in action August 1943, at the age of 27.

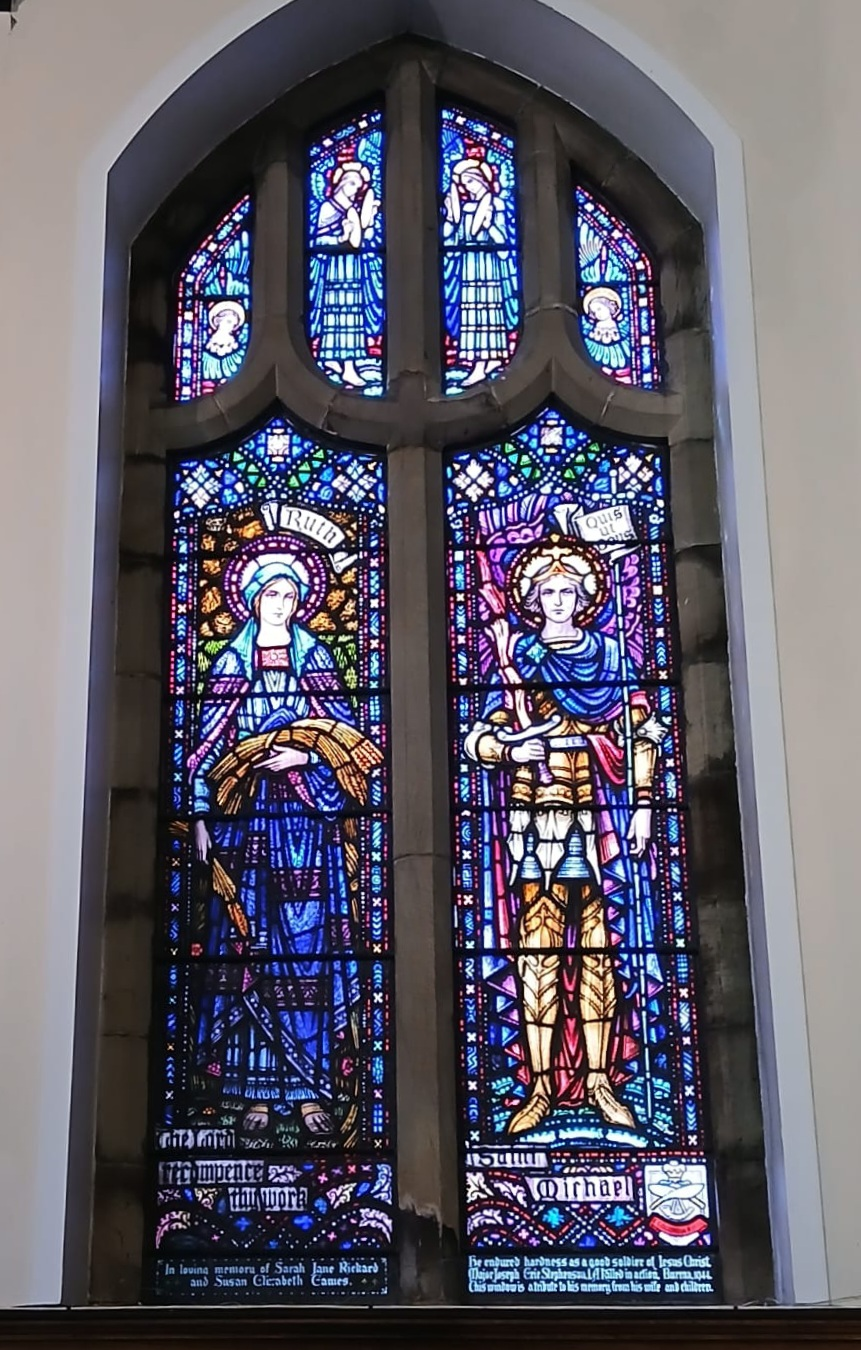
Stained glass memorial window in Lidgett Park Methodist Church. The light dedicated to Joseph Eric Stephenson depicts Saint Michael and displays his Gurkha Rifles regimental badge.

A memorial stained glass window can be found in Lidgett Park Methodist Church in Roundhay, which he attended. It was produced by Clockie of Belfast and installed in 1948.
