= Holy Week (film) =

1995 film

- Directed by: Andrzej Wajda
- Written by: Jerzy Andrzejewski; Andrzej Wajda
- Produced by: Lew Rywin
- Starring: Beata Fudalej
- Cinematography: Wit Dąbal
- Release date: 6 November 1995
- Running time: 97 minutes
- Country: Poland
- Language: Polish

Holy Week (Polish: Wielki tydzień) is a 1995 Polish drama film directed by Andrzej Wajda. It was entered into the 46th Berlin International Film Festival where it won the Silver Bear for outstanding artistic contribution.

== Plot ==
The film takes place in 1943 in occupied Warsaw. Irena Lilien, a young Jewish woman, hides with her friends. Taken by two Gestapo agents, she bribes them. On the street, she meets her ex-fiancé who takes her to his apartment. The presence of a Jewish woman gives rise to various attitudes among Poles living in the tenement house.

== Cast ==
- Beata Fudalej as Irena Lilien
- Wojciech Malajkat as Jan Malecki
- Magdalena Warzecha as Anna Malecka
- Bożena Dykiel as Mrs. Piotrowska
- Cezary Pazura as Piotrowski
- Wojciech Pszoniak as Zamojski
- Agnieszka Kotulanka as Karska
- Artur Barciś as Zaleski
- Krzysztof Stroiński as Osipowicz
- Michal Pawlicki as Irena's Father
- Maria Seweryn as Marta
- Tomasz Preniasz-Strus as Wladek
