= Ajron =

Polish music producer and director (born 1985)

- Born: Michał Dąbal; 9 November 1985 (age 40)
- Occupations: Music producer; director; editor; cinematographer
- Musical career
- Genres: Hip-hop

Michał Dąbal (born 9 November 1985 in Warsaw), known professionally as Ajron, is a Polish music producer, director, editor, and cinematographer.

== Life and work ==
Michał Dąbal began his artistic career in the 2000s. Initially, he worked as a hip-hop producer for JuNouMi Records. However, he gained prominence collaborating with the rapper Michał "Małolat" Kapliński, with whom he recorded the album W pogoni za lepszej jakości życiem, released in 2005; it reached number 14 on the Polish top 100 chart, OLiS. In addition, the duo's hit entitled "W tej grze" reached number 4 on the Szczecin Polish Radio Hit List (Polish: Szczecińska Lista Przebojów).

Until 2007, Dąbal also collaborated with hip-hop artists including Noon, Pezet, Eldo, and Włodi. Soon after, Dąbal abandoned his musical career and emigrated to the United States, where he graduated from the American Film Institute Conservatory in Los Angeles. His first success in the film industry was a year later with the film Pralnia, which Dąbal, with others, directed, edited, and shot. The film was appreciated by critics, which resulted in a Special Jury Prize at the Independent Cinema Festival "OFF jak gorąco" in Łódź, and other awards. In the meantime, Dąbal collaborated with Polish rappers as a cinematographer for music videos, including with the duo Łona and Webber and the band HiFi Banda.

== Personal life ==
He is the son of the cinematographer Wit Dąbal.
