= Onar (rapper) =

Polish rapper

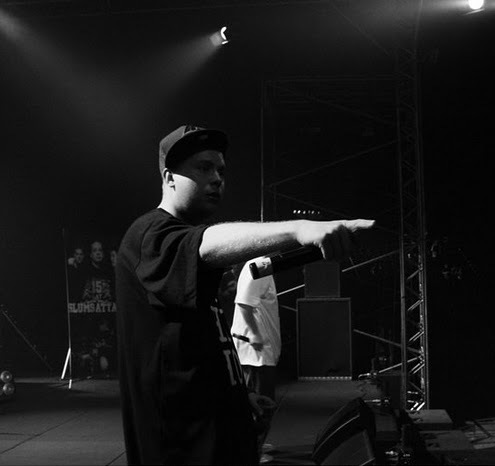
- Onar

Background information
- Born: Marcin Donesz; December 19, 1982 (age 43); Warsaw, Poland
- Genre: Hip-hop
- Occupations: Rapper, songwriter
- Years active: 1997–present
- Labels: R.R.X., Warner Music Poland, Camey Studio, Konkret Promo, Step Records
- Member of: Płomień 81
- Website: http://www.onar.com.pl

Marcin Donesz (born December 19, 1982), better known by his stage name Onar, is a Polish rapper. He began rapping and producing in his teen years with the underground group TJK which culminated in opening for Run–D.M.C. during the Rap Day '97 concert in Warsaw. TJK fell apart shortly after, and Onar proceeded to form Płomień 81 with Pezet. As of then, Onar has recorded several solo albums.

== Discography ==
=== Studio albums ===
Title	Album details	Peak chart positions
Title	Album details	POL
Osobiście	Date: June 17, 2004; Label: Camey Studio	—
Pod prąd	Date: October 1, 2007; Label: Konkret Promo	48
Jeden na milion	Date: September 9, 2009; Label: Fonografika	—
Dorosłem do rapu	Date: November 18, 2011; Label: Step Records	34
Przemytnik emocji	Date: November 6, 2012; Label: Step Records	7
"—" denotes a recording that did not chart or was not released in that territory.

=== Collaborative albums ===
Title	Album details	Peak chart positions	Sales	Certifications
Title	Album details	POL	Sales	Certifications
Superelaks (with O$ka)	Date: August 31, 2001; Label: R.R.X.	20	POL: 9,000+	
Wszystko co mogę mieć (with O$ka)	Date: March 3, 2003; Label: Warner Music Poland	23		
Nowe światło (with Miuosh)	Date: October 18, 2013; Label: Step Records	2	POL: 15,000+	POL: Gold
"—" denotes a recording that did not chart or was not released in that territory.
