= Agnieszka Kotulanka =

Polish actress

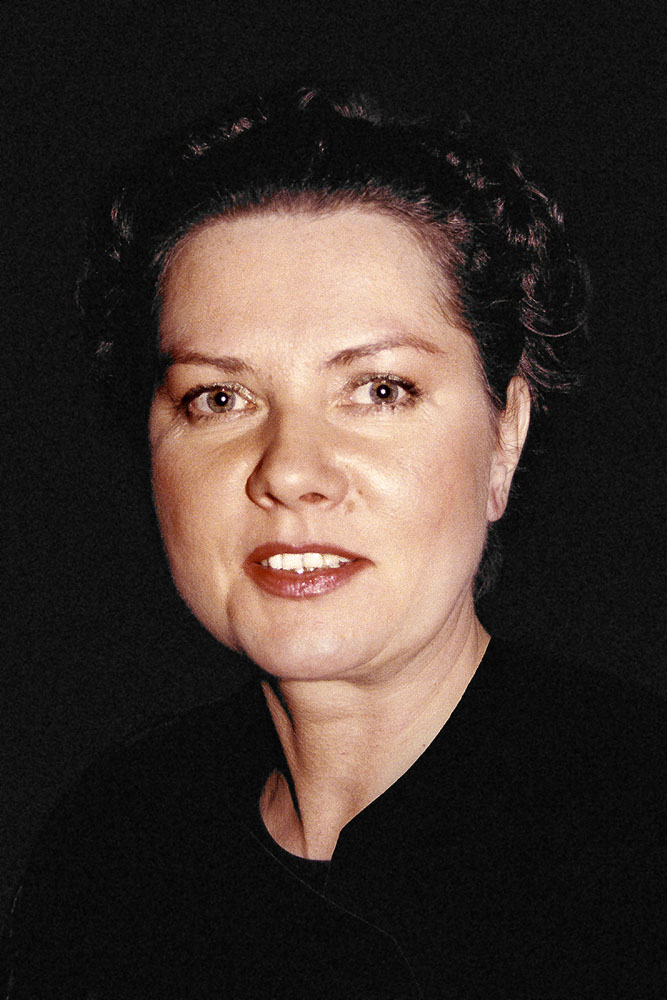
- Agnieszka Kotulanka (2002)
- Born: 26 October 1956; Warsaw, Poland
- Died: 20 February 2018 (aged 61); Warsaw, Poland
- Years active: 1980–2013
- Spouse(s): Jacek Sas Uhrynowski (married 1980 – divorced 1992)
- Children: 2

Agnieszka Kotulanka, rightly Agnieszka Sas-Uhrynowska (born Agniesza Kotuła; 26 October 1956 – 20 February 2018) was a Polish actress. She was best known for her long-term role as Krystyna Lubicz in the Polish soap opera Klan (1997–2012).

== Personal life ==
She was born in Warsaw and graduated from XXXIX Liceum Ogólnokształcące im. Lotnictwa Polskiego.

Kotulanka's married actor Jacek Sas Uhrynowski whom she met at PWST whilst they were both students there. She had two children with him, Michał and Katarzyna.

She emigrated to Canada in 1989, following her husband's acting career, but she returned to Poland 2 years later and the couple separated.

Whilst still married, she began a long-term relationship with Paweł Wawrzecki who was also married at the time.

Kotulanka struggled with alcoholism since her return from Canada, causing her to end her career in 2013.

She died in 2018 due to a stroke caused by an intracerebral hemorrhage

== Filmography ==
List of acting performances in film and television
Year	Title	Role	Notes
1980	Death of a Salesman	Letta	TV movie
1981	Dom	rural girl	episode 1, TV series
1987	Wielki Wóz	Karol's wife	Movie
1995	Holy Week	Karska	Movie, directed by Andrzej Wajda
1997-2012	Klan	Krystyna Lubicz	Regular cast
2006	Niania	Ewelina	Sitcom, guest role
2007	Hela w opałach	Jacek's mother	Sitcom, guest role
