= Alchemik =

- Polish theatrical release poster
- Directed by: Jacek Koprowicz
- Written by: Jacek Koprowicz
- Starring: Olgierd Łukaszewicz; Michał Bajor; Joanna Szczepkowska; Marek Obertyn; Michal Pawlicki
- Cinematography: Wit Dąbal; Bogdan Stachurski
- Edited by: Zbigniew; Kostrzewinski; Zenon Piórecki
- Music by: Krzesimir Dębski
- Production company: Filmowy Tor
- Release date: 7 October 1988
- Running time: 117 minutes
- Country: Poland
- Language: Polish

Alchemik is a Polish horror film written and directed by Jacek Koprowicz. It was released in 1988.

== Plot ==
An alchemist Sendivius, arrives at king Fryderyk's court, and claims that he possesses a recipe for the transmutation of base metals into gold. He claims that the transmutation emits poisonous gases, and asks everybody to leave the room. After some time Sendivus arrives with gold, which he falsely claims to be the result of transmutation. As a reward, he asks the king to release an imprisoned alchemist Tomasz Seton, who is in the possession of a real transmutation recipe. Seton is freed, however, he is already in agony and can't tell anything of value to Sendivus. The only hope of Sendivus is finding the wife of Seton, a satanist Teresa Seton, who might be in the possession of the recipe.

== Cast ==
- Olgierd Łukaszewicz as Sendivius
- Michał Bajor as Prince Fryderyk
- Joanna Szczepkowska as Teresa Seton
- Marek Obertyn as Von Rumpf
- Michal Pawlicki as Von Lotz
- Jerzy Nowak as Prince Kiejstut
- Henryk Machalica as Vasari
- Leon Niemczyk as Zwinger
- Mariusz Dmochowski as Master Melchior
- Dariusz Tomaszewski as Conaro
- Katarzyna Gałaj as Maria
- Grazyna cuper as Madame
