= Mitvim =

Think tank based in Israel

Mitvim – The Israeli Institute for Regional Foreign Policies
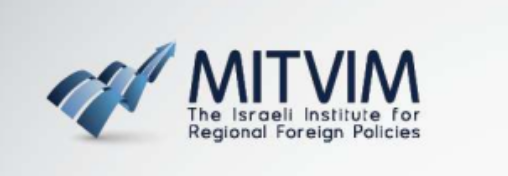
- Founded: 2011; 15 years ago
- Founder: Nimrod Goren
- Type: Foreign policy think tank
- Location: Ramat Gan, Israel
- Website: mitvim.org.il/en/

Mitvim – The Israeli Institute for Regional Foreign Policies is a think tank based in Israel. Mitvim's goals are to develop and promote a new, progressive foreign policy paradigm for Israel; to promote Israel's belonging in the region and to reshape its relations with countries in the Middle East, Europe, and the Mediterranean; and to advance Israeli–Palestinian peace.

Mitvim was established in 2011, by Nimrod Goren, a 2009-10 Fulbright Hubert H. Humphrey Fellow at Syracuse University. Mitvim is consistently ranked among the top 50 think tanks in the Middle East and North Africa by the University of Pennsylvania's Global Go To Think Tank Report, and is also recognized as one of the world's leading regional studies centers. Mitvim has core staff members as well as a network of policy fellows, researchers, and experts who regularly publish research, opinion, and policy papers and attend events and conferences around the world.

== Program areas ==
Mitvim has three main program areas: improving Israel's foreign policy; promoting Israel's regional belonging in the Middle East, the Mediterranean, and Europe; and advancing Israeli–Palestinian peace. In each program area, Mitvim produces original research and policy recommendations, which are put into policy use via publications, briefings, meetings with politicians, government officials, and diplomats, regional exchanges, and media engagement. Mitvim activities include original research, policy planning workshops, task teams, expert working groups, and public opinion polls.

To improve Israel's foreign policy, Mitvim develops guiding principles for a new foreign policy paradigm that is pro-peace, multi-regional, outward-looking, and inclusive of Palestinian citizens of Israel. Mitvim works with the Knesset and Ministry of Foreign Affairs to inform on foreign policy issues. It also studies public opinion on foreign policy-related topics, the results of which are published in an annual survey summary.

To promote Israel's regional belonging, Mitvim establishes new channels for policy dialogue with Arab think tanks and identifies the opportunities to promote Israeli–Arab regional cooperation.

To advance Israeli–Palestinian peace, Mitvim supports official peace processes and initiatives and develops new mechanisms for pro-peace civil society cooperation. Mitvim works to formulate effective incentive packages for peace, develop policy proposals to advance the peace process, and engage with Palestinian and other regional think tanks on policy dialogues towards peace.

== Activities ==
=== Government Engagement ===
Mitvim prioritizes engagement with the Knesset and government ministries, in an effort to address questions related to Israel foreign policy. Mitvim provides expertise and policy recommendations on geopolitical trends in the Middle East and Eastern Mediterranean; ways Israel should foster cooperative relations with its European partners; how to maintain the prospects of a two-state solution, encourage Israeli-Palestinian dialogue, and restart direct negotiations; and how to improve and empower Israel's foreign service.

Mitvim's outreach to Israel's political leadership and civil servants includes special briefings, workshops, and public events. The institute also meets regularly with international diplomats, special envoys, and foreign decision-makers.

=== Policy Dialogues ===
Mitvim participates in regional dialogues with actors from around the world, often producing joint policy recommendations with other institutes. Since its founding, Mitvim has prioritized establishing and maintaining lines of communication between Israeli and Turkish policymakers.

Mitvim also engages in dialogue with Jordanian and Palestinian diplomatic and civil society partners. In October 2020, following the normalization agreement between Israel and the UAE, Mitvim established an Israeli-Emirate dialogue track with an institute in Abu Dhabi.

Mitvim regularly participates in joint policy projects with civil organizations and policy institutes in Europe and the Eastern Mediterranean, focusing on issues pertaining to energy, regional security and economic cooperation, strengthening democratic values, and international engagement on the Israeli-Palestinian conflict.

=== Syracuse University Summer Course ===
Mitvim runs an intensive summer course, “Domestic and Regional Aspects of the Israeli-Palestinian Peace Process,” for graduate students of Syracuse University's Institute for National Security and Counterterrorism. The course includes a series of expert lectures and tours centered on the impact of social and political processes in Israel and the Middle East on the future of the peace process, as well as on US attempts to move the peace process forward.

== Annual conference ==
Mitvim held its first annual conference in Jerusalem, on November 1, 2017. The conference, titled "Opportunities for Israel's Foreign Relations Towards 2018," included a keynote address by Avi Gabbay, Chairman of the Labor Party and Zionist Union. Since then, Mitvim has hosted its annual conference every year, featuring both area experts and foreign policy practitioners. Conferences often address the findings of Mitvim's annual Israeli Foreign Policy Index, synthesized with data from public opinion polling done over the course of the year. Due to the coronavirus pandemic, the 2020 annual conference was held online.

== Annual Foreign Policy Index ==
Mitvim publishes an annual Israeli Foreign Policy Index. Since 2012, the poll has been carried out by the Rafi Smith Institute, and in cooperation with Friedrich-Ebert-Stiftung. The poll includes questions relating to five categories: the state of Israel's foreign policy, Israel among the nations, foreign policy priorities and bilateral relations, regional cooperation, and the Israeli-Palestinian peace process and tracks changing trends in addition to presenting the annual data.
