= Zipera =

Polish hip hop group

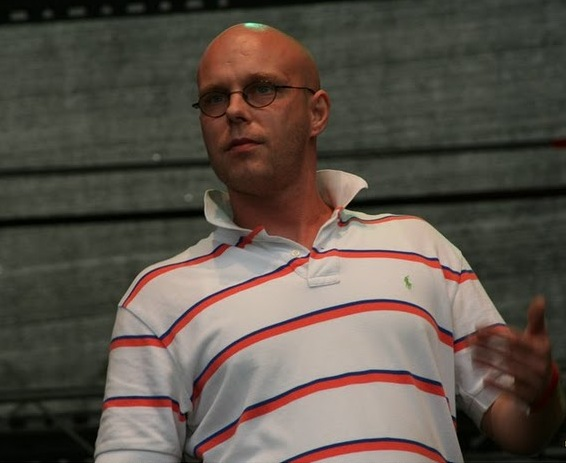
- Pono in 2008

Background information
- Origin: Warsaw, Poland
- Genres: Hip hop
- Years active: 1999–2005, 2008–2009, 2011
- Labels: Baza Label, Prosto
- Members: Pono; Koras; Fu

Zipera is a Polish hip hop group connected with WWO and Fundacja in a larger crew called ZIP Skład.

== Discography ==
Title	Album details	Peak chart positions	Sales
Title	Album details	POL	Sales
O.N.F.R.	Released: 24 June 2000; Label: Baza Label/Pomaton EMI; Formats: CD	—	POL: 10,000+
Druga strona medalu	Released: 14 February 2004; Label: Prosto/Pomaton EMI; Formats: CD, LP, digital download	8	
"—" denotes a recording that did not chart or was not released in that territory.
