= Ten Typ Mes =

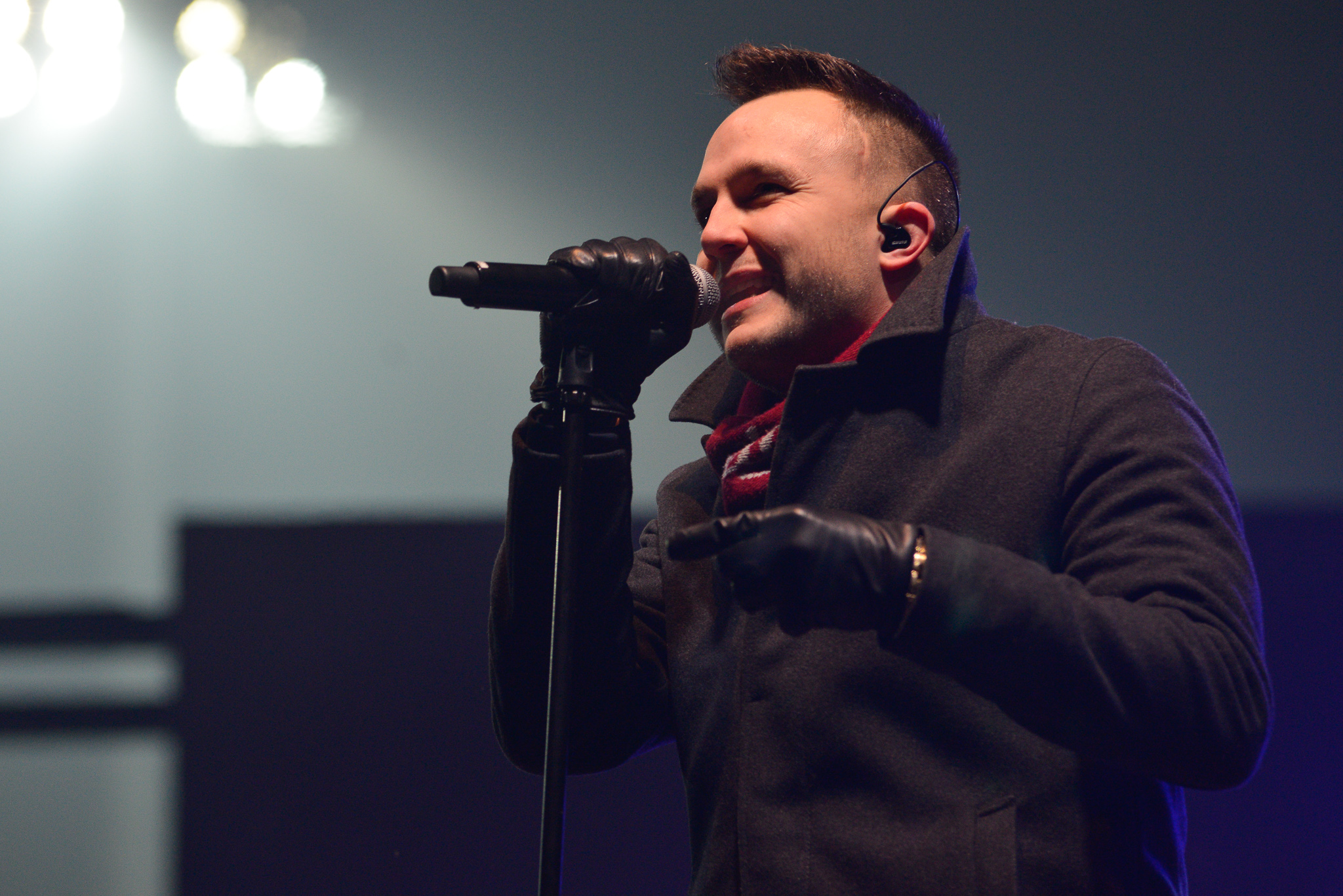

Background information
- Also known as: Ten Typ Mes, Mes, DJ M-Easy
- Born: Piotr Szmidt; 24 December 1982 (age 43)
- Origin: Warsaw, Poland
- Genre: Hip hop
- Occupations: Rapper, record producer
- Instrument: keyboards
- Label: Alkopoligamia.com

Piotr Szmidt (born 24 December 1982 in Warsaw), better known by his stage name Ten Typ Mes, is a Polish rapper and record producer.

== Discography ==
Title	Album details	Peak chart positions	Sales	Certifications
Title	Album details	POL	Sales	Certifications
Alkopoligamia: zapiski typa	Released: 31 October 2005; Label: T1-Teraz; Formats: CD (+CD), LP	26		
Zamach na przeciętność	Released: 27 April 2009; Label: Alkopoligamia.com; Formats: CD (+CD), LP, digital download	29		
Kandydaci na szaleńców	Released: 18 April 2011; Label: Alkopoligamia.com; Formats: CD (+CD), LP, digital download	2	POL: 7,500+	POL: Gold
Ten Typ Mes i Lepsze Żbiki	Released: 24 June 2013; Label: Alkopoligamia.com; Formats: CD, digital download	3		
Trzeba było zostać dresiarzem	Released: 18 April 2014; Label: Alkopoligamia.com; Formats: CD, digital download	4	POL: 15,000+	POL: Gold
"—" denotes a recording that did not chart or was not released in that territory.
