= WWO =

Polish hip hop group

- Origin: Warsaw
- Genres: Hip hop
- Years active: 2000–present
- Labels: BMG Poland, Prosto
- Members: Sokół; Jędker; DJ Deszczu Strugi
- Website: www.prosto.pl

WWO is a Polish hip hop group. The letters in the group's name originally stood for W Witrynach Odbicia.

The two members of the group which originally started the underground project, which was WWO ("W Witrynach Odbicia" - "Shopping windows reflections") or ("W Wyjatkowych Okolicznosciach" - "In exceptional circumstances"), were: Sokół and Jędker (rapper) establishing themselves underground in 1996 releasing singles like 'Flippery' and 'Kolenda' which were made on tape and sold underground. The group claim these singles were made purely for themselves, for their own pleasure and enjoyment of hip-hop. WWO is part of a wider crew called ZIP skład, the members of which are: Jędker, Sokół, Pono, Felipe, Mieron, Jaźwa, Ward, Koras and Fu. WWO's first album release was called "Masz i Pomyśl". In that album featured 600V, Włodi and Pele from Molesta, Deszczu Strugi, and the rest of ZIP Skład. After this album the group came into conflict with their record label "BMG Poland" and for legal reasons could no continue producing under their current name. They had a choice: either give up entirely or continue under a different name. Thus is December 2001 WWO ("W Witrynach Odbicia") ceased to exist and the group continued under their new name "W Wyjątkowych Okolicznościach". In this group Deszczu Strugi joined the other two members, mentioned above. He has been acclaimed as arguably one of the best hip-hop DJs in Poland. He has also performed for various other Polish hip-hop groups such as Mor W.A. and TrzyHa.

"Damy radę"

The first album of WWO was published by BMG. Sokół became the co-owner of Prosto Music Label and Prosto Clothing. The new group then released their second album in October 2002 titled "We Własnej Osobie". Their best-known hits include "Nie bój się zmiany na lepsze", "Sen", "Każdy ponad każdym" or "Damy radę". Their texts are in Polish. The two latest albums were both released in late 2005, titled "Witam Was w Rzeczywistości" and "Życie Na Kredycie".

After they stopped to recording together as WWO, Jędker dropped his solo album "Czas na prawdę", DJ Deszczu Strugi became the owner of the famous Otrabarwa Studio in Warsaw Poland, and Sokół recorded two albums with another ZIP Sklad member Pono, and two with lady singer Marysia Starosta.

== Discography ==
Title	Album details	Peak chart positions	Sales	Certifications
Title	Album details	POL	Sales	Certifications
Masz i pomyśl	Released: September 6, 2000; Label: BMG Poland; Formats: CD	13	POL: 25,000+	
We własnej osobie	Released: October 28, 2002; Label: Prosto; Formats: CD, digital download	8		
Witam was w rzeczywistości	Released: November 15, 2005; Label: Prosto; Formats: CD, digital download	12	POL: 15,000+	POL: Gold
Życie na kredycie	Released: November 15, 2005; Label: Prosto; Formats: CD, digital download	18	POL: 15,000+	POL: Gold
"—" denotes a recording that did not chart or was not released in that territory.
