= Czarny =

Czarny (Polish pronunciation: [ˈtʂarnɨ]) is a surname or a byname of Polish language origin. The nickname literally may mean "black", "dirty", "ugly", etc. Feminine forms: Czarna, Czarnina (historical, after husband), Czarnianka (historical, after father). Notable people with the name include:

== Byname ==
- Hryćka Czarny
- Leszek Czarny (c. 1241–1288), Polish prince
- Mikolaj Czarny Radziwill
- Zawisza Czarny (c. 1379–1428), Polish knight and nobleman
