= Płomień 81 =

Polish hip-hop group

- Origin: Warsaw, Poland
- Genres: Hip-hop
- Years active: 1998–present
- Labels: Asfalt Records, R.R.X.
- Members: Pezet, Onar
- Past members: Deus

Płomień 81 (literally "Flame 81") is a Polish hip-hop group founded in Warsaw. It was formed by the Polish rappers Pezet and Onar in 1998. The group name originates from the school in which the two rappers met (Primary School No. 81 in Ursynów).

== History ==
The first song produced by Płomień 81 was "Ursynów", featuring Lady K on the mixtape Enigma: 0-22 vol. 2. Soon after, Płomień 81 was signed on by the Polish label Asfalt Records. In 1999 the mini-album Asfalt Wiosna '99 (literally "Asphalt Spring '99") was released with the two songs "Muzyka" and "Miłe słowa". Later in the same year, the debut album Na zawsze będzie płonął which was produced by O$ka was released. This was followed by the release of the mixtape Hip-hopowy raport z osiedla which featured the song "Pytasz kim jestem".

After their debut, Płomień 81 was invited to work with DJ 600V on the album Szejsetkilovolt he was producing. The group did the vocals for the song "Mieszkam w mieście", and were featured on the song of another artist - Deus, who later joined Płomień 81. In 2000 the group decided to drop the Asfalt Records label and instead sign with RRX due to being unhappy with the promotion they were receiving from the label. This was soon followed by the release of their second album under the RRX label, Nasze dni. Płomień 81 was once again invited to record a song, "Projekt jest w drodze", for the album Wkurwione bity being produced by DJ 600V. After their work together, Onar and Pezet decided to end their collaboration and to pursue their musical careers separately.

Their third album, "Historie z sąsiedztwa", premiered on October 15, 2005. Deus did not contribute to this album, but it did feature the rappers Nowator and Dwie Asie. During this time Pezet's brother Małolat (also a rapper) was arrested on suspicions of drug trafficking. This prompted a campaign to free Małolat through the use of donated funds to cover the costs of the legal proceedings. Pezet wrote a song titled "Jestem przeciw" (literally, "I'm against it") where he expresses his discontent with the state of Polish politics and bureaucracy. This song was on the group's newest and also most popular album. Their latest album was so well received that it was selected by users of hip-hop.pl and rapgra.com as the best album in 2005. Three music videos were recorded to promote the album from the songs "Powiedz na osiedlu", "WWA", and "Odwaga".

== Discography ==
| Year | Title | Position on the Charts |
| Year | Title | POL |
|---|---|---|
| 1999 | Na zawsze będzie płonął (literally "Forever It Will Burn"): Date: August 27, 1999; Label: Asfalt Records | — |
| 2000 | Nasze dni (literally "Our Days"): Date: October 26, 2000; Label: R.R.X. | — |
| 2005 | Historie z sąsiedztwa (literally "Stories from the Neighborhood"): Date: October 15, 2005; Label: Konkret Promo | 8 |
"—" position was not noted.
