= Noon (musician) =

Polish electronic musician & producer (born 1979)

- Also known as: Comey, Noon
- Born: Mikołaj Bugajak; January 2, 1979 (age 47)
- Origin: Warsaw, Poland
- Genres: Trip hop, electro, chiptune, hip hop
- Occupations: Musician, Producer, DJ
- Instruments: Sampler/Sequencer, Turntables, Mixer
- Years active: 1998 - present
- Labels: Asfalt Records, Teeto Records, Canteen Records
- Website: http://asfalt.pl/noon.html

Noon is a pseudonym of Polish electronic musician and producer Mikołaj Bugajak. He was born in 1979 in Warsaw, Poland. He began his career with the hip-hop band Grammatik, which in 1998 issued its first EP.

His music evolved from downtempo/ambient grooves to breakbeat electronica. All of Noon’s works are based on vinyl sampling and spiced up with analogue synthesis. He has own home music studio called “33Obroty” where the whole music works are taking place. DJ Twister

One video has been shot for "Studio Games" single from "Studio Games" CD.

His two LP’s with warsaw’s rapper Pezet made him one of Poland’s most respected producers.

Noon's tracks also appeared on UK based Canteen Records and Canadian Launchbox Recordings labels' releases.

== Discography ==
=== Albums ===
- Bleak Output (2001, Teeto Records)
- Vision (2002, Teeto Records)
- Studio Games (Gry Studyjne) (2003, Teeto Records/Canteen Records)
- Pewne Sekwencje (2008, Asfalt Records)
- ALGORYTM (EP, 2018)
