= Małolat =

Polish rapper

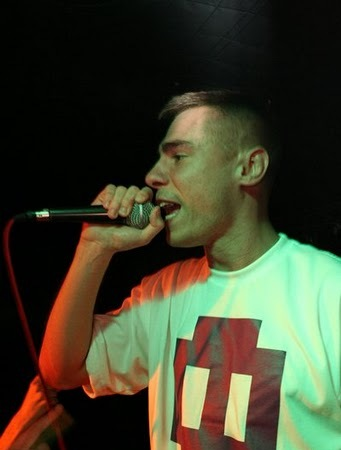
- Małolat

Background information
- Born: Michał Kapliński; February 7, 1984 (age 42); Warsaw, Poland
- Origin: Warsaw, Poland
- Genre: Hip-hop
- Occupations: Rapper, songwriter
- Years active: 1998–present
- Label: Prosto

Michał Kapliński (born February 7, 1984), better known by his stage name Małolat, is a Polish rapper. Małolat has a brother who is also a rapper, better known as Pezet.

In 1998 he won the Super MC contest, in which the main prize was an appearance on the collaborative album Hip-hopowy raport z osiedla w najlepszym wydaniu. The album featured the song "Miłość braterska", which Małolat recorded with the group Płomień 81 (which his brother was a member of). Małolat later also appeared on the first two discs of Płomień 81, and also on both parts of the album Kompilacja by O$ka. In 2003 Małolat began recording a joint album with Ajron. The album was released in early 2005 and was titled W pogoni za lepszej jakości życiem.

== Discography ==
| Title | Album details | Peak chart positions | Sales | Certifications |
| Title | Album details | POL | Sales | Certifications |
|---|---|---|---|---|
| Żądło (with Ciech) | Released: 2004; Label: Self-released; Formats: CD | — | | |
| W pogoni za lepszej jakości życiem (with Ajron) | Released: January 6, 2005; Label: Prosto; Formats: CD, digital download | 14 | | |
| Dziś w moim mieście (with Pezet) | Released: October 2, 2010; Label: Koka Beats, Fonografika; Formats: CD, digital download | 5 | POL: 15,000+ | POL: Gold |
| Live in 1500m2 (with Pezet) | Released: June 5, 2012; Label: Koka Beats, EMI; Formats: CD, digital download | — | | |
"—" denotes a recording that did not chart or was not released in that territory.
