= List of number-one albums of 2017 (Poland) =

Number-One Albums of 2017

This is a list of number-one albums of 2017 in Poland, per the OLiS chart.

== Chart history ==
Issue date	Album	Artist(s)	Reference
5 January	Hardwired... to Self-Destruct	Metallica	
12 January	Number Ones	Michael Jackson	
19 January	Number Ones	Michael Jackson	
26 January	Number Ones	Michael Jackson	
2 February	Dandys Flow	Dwa Sławy	
9 February	Świattło	Hades	
16 February	Moja miłość	Michał Bajor	
23 February	Ciało obce	happysad	
2 March	Aby śmierć miała znaczenie	Bedoes and Kubi Producent	
9 March	Evil Twin	Guzior	
16 March	÷	Ed Sheeran	
23 March	÷	Ed Sheeran	
30 March	Spirit	Depeche Mode	
6 April	Tu	LemON	
13 April	Annoyance and Disappointment	Dawid Podsiadło	
20 April	Remisja	Peja and Slums Attack	
27 April	Eterno Agosto	Álvaro Soler	
11 May	Siesta XII	Various artists	
18 May	Minione	Anna Maria Jopek and Gonzalo Rubalcaba	
25 May	Harry Styles	Harry Styles	
1 June	Zenit	WSRH	
8 June	On	Tau	
16 June	Is This the Life We Really Want?	Roger Waters	
22 June	Egzotyka	Quebonafide	
29 June	Egzotyka	Quebonafide	
6 July	Skrrrt	Tede and Sir Michu	
13 July	Egzotyka	Quebonafide	
20 July	Bravo Hits: Lato 2017	Various artists	
27 July	Live in London	Leonard Cohen	
3 August	Live in London	Leonard Cohen	
10 August	To Be Loved	Michael Bublé	
17 August	To Be Loved	Michael Bublé	
24 August	To Be Loved	Michael Bublé	
31 August	18 Hits	ABBA	
7 September	Szprycer	Taco Hemingway	
14 September	U218 Singles	U2	
21 September	The Best of 25 Years	Sting	
28 September	The Best of 25 Years	Sting	
5 October	The Best of 25 Years	Sting	
12 October	Dla naiwnych marzycieli	Ania Dąbrowska	
19 October	Spirit	Depeche Mode	
26 October	Spirit	Depeche Mode	
2 November	x	Ed Sheeran	
9 November	x	Ed Sheeran	
16 November	Mój dom	Kortez	
23 November	Twenty Five	George Michael	
30 November	Twenty Five	George Michael	
7 December	Złota Owca	Paluch	
14 December	Nowa fala	Young Multi	
21 December	Złota kolekcja: Kolędy i pastorałki	Various artists	

== See also ==
- List of number-one singles of 2017 (Poland)
