= Graal =

Graal may refer to:

== Music ==
- Graal (album), 2015
  - "Graal" (Medium song), 2015
- "Graal" (Ne Obvlisicaris song), 2023

== Other ==
- Graal (glasteknik), a style of glassblowing
- Graal-Müritz, a health resort by the Baltic Sea in Germany
- Graal Online, an MMORPG
- GRAph ALigner (GRAAL), an algorithm for aligning two different graphs
- GraalVM, a Java virtual machine extension aiming to support more languages and execution modes
- Holy Grail, or "Graal" in older forms
- Ambassador Graal, a Tellarite character in the Star Trek: Enterprise episode "Babel One"
- Rede Graal, Brazilian chain of gas stations and restaurants
