= Styl życia G'N.O.J.A. =

Styl życia G'N.O.J.A

Studio album by Peja
- Released: December 6, 2008
- Recorded: 2006–2008
- Genre: hip-hop
- Length: 90:00
- Label: Fonografika

Peja chronology
Styl życia G'N.O.J.A (2008)	Na serio (2009)

Professional ratings
Review scores
Source	Rating
Onet.pl	2.5/5 stars
Rapportal.pl	(8.7/10)

Styl życia G'N.O.J.A (Polish pronunciation: [ˌstɨl ˌʐɨt͡ɕa ˈɡnɔja], English: Lifestyle of a B'.A.S.T.A.R.D.) is an album by rapper Peja. Double album (90 minutes) contains 22 tracks, over which the artist worked from 2006 to 2008. The official premiere took place on 6 December. On December 8, the album was certified gold. In April 2011 the album was certified platinum. The album features several fellow rappers: Charlie P (alter ego), Kaczor, Bigus, Sandra, Four (Czwórka), Brahu and PTP.

== Track listing ==
CD 1

1. "SZG Intro" - 1:22
2. "Szkoła życia" / "School of Life" (feat. Kaczor) - 4:59
3. "Bragga" (feat. Charlie P) - 4:05
4. "Muza trzyma mnie przy życiu" / "Music is What Keeps Me Alive" - 3:46
5. "Definicja pener" / "The Definition of Pener" - 4:34
6. "Gruba impra z Rysiem" / "A Big Party with Richie" (feat. Biguś) - 3:36
7. "To Pe Do En (Jestem stąd)" / "It's Poznań (I'm from there)" (feat. Sandra) - 4:02
8. "Na dnie..." / "At the Bottom..." - 4:32
9. "Rap moją kokainą" / "Rap is My Cocaine" - 3:51
10. "Moralniak" / "Moral Hangover" - 3:14
11. "Regulamin zabijania" / "Rules of Killing" (feat. Czwórka) - 4:59

CD 2

1. "Ta chwila…" / "This Moment" (feat. Sandra) - 3:33
2. "Zmieni się na lepsze…" / "It Will Change for Better" - 4:32
3. "Ja Pierdolę" / "Fucking Hell", or lit. "I'm Fucking" (feat. RDW & Brahu) - 4:28
4. "Getto (Stylowe rymy)" / "Getto (Stylish Rhymes)" - 4:16
5. "Staszica Story Czwórka" / "Staszica Story Four" - 4:07
6. "Tak bardzo chcę" / "I Want So Much" [much acts here as an adverb] (feat. Charlie P) - 4:00
7. "Dziś wyjdziesz ze mną" / "Today/tonight you're going out with me" - 4:42
8. "(Z)robię szmal" / "I (will) make money" (feat. PTP) - 4:39
9. "De najsłodsza w mieście" / "De sweetest one in the city" - 3:17
10. "All Inclusive" - 3:46
11. "Definicja pener (Remix Czwórka)" - 4:54
