= Archeon =

Archeon can refer to:

- An organism belong to the domain archaea.
- Archeon, Netherlands, a Dutch archeological theme park in Alphen aan den Rijn
- Made of Hate, a Polish melodic death metal band (transformed from the band Archeon).
