= Pathogen (disambiguation) =

A pathogen is a microorganism in the widest sense that causes disease in its host.

Pathogen may also refer to:

- Pathogen (Two Steps from Hell album), 2007
- Pathogen (Made of Hate album), 2010
- Pathogen (film), a 2006 zombie horror independent film
- "Pathogen" (Stargate Universe), an episode of Stargate Universe

== See also ==
- Pathogenic (video game), 2026 video game
