= Remedium =

Studio album by Tau
- Released: 3 December 2014
- Genre: Christian hip hop; conscious hip hop
- Length: 77:36
- Language: Polish; English
- Label: Bozon Records
- Producer: Tau; Chris Carson; Gawvi; Zdolny

Tau chronology
Graal (2012)	Remedium (2014)	Restaurator (2015)

Remedium (Polish remedy) is the third studio album by Polish rapper Tau, released on 3 December 2014 by his own label Bozon Records. It was his first album released after changing his stage name from Medium to Tau. The album features guest appearances by Kali, Bezczel, Buka, Paluch, Zeus, the singer Agnieszka Musiał and rapper Lecrae. At first, rapper stated there was going to be guest appearances by KęKę and Peja, although their contribution was canceled by Tau himself.

Remedium was promoted with four singles: "Logo Land", released on 24 September 2014, "List motywacyjny" with featured appearance by Paluch, which was released on 28 October 2014, "BHO" recorded along with Bezczel and "Remedium", which was shared on Tau's page on 2 October 2014. For all of those tracks there were videos made. In contradistinction to previous Tau's projects, on which he was in charge of the entire production, Remedium was produced by several producers, such as Zdolny, Chris Carson and Gawvi.

The album debuted at number 4 on the Polish OLiS chart, having sold over fifteen thousand copies within several months.

== Track listing ==
No.	Title	Producer(s)	Length
1.	"Pierwsze tchnienie"	Tau	4:42
2.	"Bóg rapu"	Tau	4:31
3.	"Lato 2000"	Tau	4:13
4.	"Made In Serce" (featuring Zeus / background vocal Agnieszka Musiał)	Zdolny	4:41
5.	"Logo Land"	Zdolny	3:45
6.	"BHO" (featuring Bezczel, Klaudia Duda)	Tau	4:58
7.	"Magiczne słowa"	Zdolny	3:29
8.	"Maria Konopnicka" (featuring Buka)	Zdolny	4:57
9.	"Godline" (featuring Lecrae)	Gawvi	3:52
10.	"List motywacyjny" (featuring Paluch)	Tau, Zdolny	4:54
11.	"Ostatni raz" (background vocal Agnieszka Musiał)	Tau	5:33
12.	"Łzy" (background vocal Agnieszka Musiał)	Tau	4:44
13.	"Nawigator" (featuring Kali)	Chris Carson	2:58
14.	"Remedium"	Tau	4:18
15.	"Remedium"	Tau	4:04
16.	"Cudotwórca" (background vocal Agnieszka Musiał)	Tau	5:43
17.	"Puk puk" (background vocal Agnieszka Musiał, Kamila Pałasz)	Tau	6:14
Total length:			77:36

Sample credits

- "Pierwsze tchnienie" contains a sample from "Impeach the President" by The Honey Drippers and "This Masquerade" by George Benson.
- "BHO" contains a sample from "Jesteś tu" by Maria Koterbska.
- "Puk puk" contains a sample from "Zabiorę Cię ze sobą" by Halina Frąckowiak and Grupa ABC Andrzeja Nebeskiego.

== Personnel ==
All information about the personnel was adopted from Discogs.

Musicians

- Tau - rap, lyrics, producer, executive producer
- Zeus - rap, lyrics
- Kali - rap, lyrics
- Bezczel - rap, lyrics
- Buka - rap, lyrics
- Lecrae - rap, lyrics
- Paluch - rap, lyrics
- Agnieszka Musiał - background vocal
- Kamila Pałasz - background vocal
- Klaudia Duda - soprano
- Chris Carson - producer
- Gawvi - producer
- Zdolny - producer
- Cabatino - bass guitar (tracks: 3, 10)
- Piotr Restecki - acoustic guitar (track: 10)

Technical personnel

- Marek Dulewicz - mixing, mastering
- Jacob "Biz" Morris - mixing (track: 9)
- Wojciech Niebelski - sound engineer
- Karolina Wilczyńska - photography
- SewerX - artwork
- Published by Bozon Records
- Distributed by Step Records

Recording

- Recorded at United Records in Kielce
