= Teoria równoległych wszechświatów =

Studio album by Medium
- Released: 21 November 2011
- Recorded: April–May 2011
- Genre: Hip-hop
- Length: 56:01
- Label: Asfalt Records
- Producers: Medium; O.S.T.R.; Emade; Qciek

Medium chronology
Alternatywne źródło energii (2010)	Teoria równoległych wszechświatów (2011)	Graal (2012)

Teoria równoległych wszechświatów (pol. The Theory of Parallel Universes) is a debut album by Polish rapper Medium (currently known as Tau) released on 21 November 2011 by Asfalt Records. The album was entirely rapped, produced and arranged by Medium except three remixes exclusively released on an LP edition which were produced by Qciek, O.S.T.R. and Emade respectively.

The album received positive opinions both from listeners and reviewers who praised Medium's way of using various samples and ability to build "wide sound".

Despite a little advertising campaign Teoria równoległych wszechświatów has sold eight thousand copies and Polish hip-hop portal conferred Medium the title of "revelation of the year".

== Track listing ==
All songs were produced and arranged by Medium.

#	Title	Translation	Sample / notes	Time
1	"Geneza"	"Genesis"	Supertramp - "School"	1:18
2	"Nieznane"	"Unknown"	Jukka Kuoppamäki - "So Much, So Soon"; Babies Singers (Piccolo Coro dell'Antoniano) - "Dormi Mio Dolce Tesoro (Ninna Nanna Di Mozart)"; Funk, Inc. - "Kool Is Back"	4:31
3	"Winda sumienia"	"Elevator of Conscience"	Anna German - "Bal u Posejdona"; Guitar: Piotr Restecki	3:02
4	"Spokój Ducha"	"Peace of Mind"	James Royal - "Call My Name"	3:02
5	"Teoria równoległych wszechświatów"	"The Theory of Parallel Universes"	The Backyard Heavies - "Expo '83"	3:00
6	"Zmartwychwstanie"	"Resurrection"	Common - "Resurrection '95"; Hi-Tek - "The Sun God"; Keyboard: Radosław Kupis	3:32
7	"Aromantycznie"	"Aromantically"	Nat King Cole - "These Foolish Things"; Keith Jarrett - "Köln, January 24, 1975 Part II A"; Guitar: Piotr Restecki; Trumpet: Rafcox	4:06
8	"Gwiazda wieczoru"	"The Star of the Evening"		3:03
9	"Pralnia myśli"	"Laundry of Thoughts"	Hanna Banaszak - "Nadciąga Banał"; Cold Grits - "It’s Your Thing"	2:46
10	"Niewidzialna część"	"Invisible Part"	The Backyard Heavies - "Expo '83"	3:22
11	"Karuzela"	"Carousel"		3:37
12	"Dzielnica uNYsłu"	"Neighborhood of Mind"	Miles Davis - "Bitches Brew"; Sugar Billy Garner - "I Got Some"; Das EFX - "Mic Checka"; Das EFX - "Real Hip-Hop"; Nas - "N.Y. State of Mind"; Ludacris - "I Do It for Hip Hop"; Keyboard: Bartłomiej Borowiecki	3:59
13	"Przyjacielu"	"Friend"	Osjan - "Ossian"; Halina Frąckowiak & Grupa ABC - "Zabiorę Cię Ze Sobą"	2:33
14	"Obiekt pożądania"	"The Object of Desire"	Chuck Mangione - "Love the Feelin'"; Bravehearts - "Situations"; Diggin' in the Crates Crew - "Thick"; Big L - "M.V.P."; Mary J. Blige - "Not Today"	3:06
15	"Żeglarzu"	"Sailor"	Grupa Skifflowa No To Co & Piotr Janczerski - "Świeci Się Warszawa"; Osjan - "Księga Deszczu VI"; Medium - "Spodziewam się końca świata"; Bass guitar: Tomasz Murawski	4:43
16	"Promień"	"Ray"	Aaliyah - "Rock the Boat"; Nas - "N.Y. State of Mind"; Trumpet: Rafcox	4:37
17	"Redial"	"Redial"	Supertramp - "School"	1:19
Bonus LP tracks
18	"Dzielnica uNYsłu" (Qciek Remix)	"Neighborhood of Mind" (Qciek Remix)	Margie Joseph - "Punish Me"	4:56
19	"Nieznane" (O.S.T.R. Remix)	"Unknown" (O.S.T.R. Remix)		4:04
20	"Winda sumienia" (Emade Remix)	"Elevator of Conscience" (Emade Remix)		2:56
