= List of number-one singles of 2017 (Poland) =

This is a list of the songs that reached number-one position in official Polish single chart in ZPAV in 2017.

== Chart history ==
Issue date	Song	Artist(s)	Reference(s)
January 7	"Spirit"	Gromee featuring Mahan Moin	
January 14	"Magic Symphony"	C-BooL featuring Giang Pham	
January 21	"Libre"	Álvaro Soler featuring Monika Lewczuk	
January 28	"Libre"	Álvaro Soler featuring Monika Lewczuk	
February 4	"Shape of You"	Ed Sheeran	
February 11	"Shape of You"	Ed Sheeran	
February 18	"Shape of You"	Ed Sheeran	
February 25	"Shape of You"	Ed Sheeran	
March 4	"Shape of You"	Ed Sheeran	
March 11	"Shape of You"	Ed Sheeran	
March 18	"Shape of You"	Ed Sheeran	
March 25	"Shape of You"	Ed Sheeran	
April 1	"Shape of You"	Ed Sheeran	
April 8	"On My Way"	Tiësto featuring Bright Sparks	
April 15	"Chained to the Rhythm"	Katy Perry featuring Skip Marley	
April 22	"Chained to the Rhythm"	Katy Perry featuring Skip Marley	
April 29	"On My Way"	Tiësto featuring Bright Sparks	
May 6	"O Pani!"	Grzegorz Hyży	
May 13	"Something Just Like This"	The Chainsmokers and Coldplay	
May 20	"O Pani!"	Grzegorz Hyży	
May 27	"O Pani!"	Grzegorz Hyży	
June 3	"Despacito"	Luis Fonsi featuring Daddy Yankee	
June 10	"Sign of the Times"	Harry Styles	
June 17	"Symphony"	Clean Bandit featuring Zara Larsson	
June 24	"Sign of the Times"	Harry Styles	
July 1	"Sign of the Times"	Harry Styles	
July 8	"Me Enamoré"	Shakira	
July 15	"OK"	Robin Schulz featuring James Blunt	
July 22	"OK"	Robin Schulz featuring James Blunt	
July 29	"OK"	Robin Schulz featuring James Blunt	
August 5	"Time Won't Wait"	Filatov & Karas	
August 12	"Time Won't Wait"	Filatov & Karas	
August 19	"Time Won't Wait"	Filatov & Karas	
August 26	"Time Won't Wait"	Filatov & Karas	
September 2	"Time Won't Wait"	Filatov & Karas	
September 9	"Nieprawda" (Gromee Remix)	Ania Dąbrowska	
September 16	"Feels"	Calvin Harris featuring Pharrell Williams, Katy Perry and Big Sean	
September 23	"Feels"	Calvin Harris featuring Pharrell Williams, Katy Perry and Big Sean	
September 30	"What About Us"	Pink	
October 7	"More Than You Know"	Axwell Λ Ingrosso	
October 14	"More Than You Know"	Axwell Λ Ingrosso	
October 21	"More Than You Know"	Axwell Λ Ingrosso	
October 28	"Dusk Till Dawn"	Zayn featuring Sia	
November 4	"Z Tobą nie umiem wygrać"	Ania Dąbrowska	
November 11	"Dusk Till Dawn"	Zayn featuring Sia	
November 18	"Z Tobą nie umiem wygrać"	Ania Dąbrowska	
November 25	"Dusk Till Dawn"	Zayn featuring Sia	
December 2	"Perfect"	Ed Sheeran	
December 9	"Havana"	Camila Cabello featuring Young Thug	
December 16	"Havana"	Camila Cabello featuring Young Thug	
December 23	"Havana"	Camila Cabello featuring Young Thug	
December 30	"Perfect"	Ed Sheeran	

== Number-one artists ==
Position	Artist	Weeks at #1
1	Ed Sheeran	11
2	Filatov & Karas	5
3	Katy Perry (as solo and featuring)	4
4	Grzegorz Hyży	3
4	Harry Styles	3
4	Robin Schulz	3
4	James Blunt (as featuring)	3
4	Axwell Λ Ingrosso	3
4	Ania Dąbrowska	3
4	Zayn	3
4	Sia (as featuring)	3
4	Camila Cabello	3
4	Young Thug (as featuring)	3
5	Álvaro Soler	2
5	Monika Lewczuk (as featuring)	2
5	Skip Marley (as featuring)	2
5	Tiësto	2
5	Bright Sparks (as featuring)	2
5	Calvin Harris	2
5	Pharrell Williams (as featuring)	2
5	Big Sean (as featuring)	2
6	Gromee	1
6	Mahan Moin (as featuring)	1
6	C-BooL	1
6	Giang Pham (as featuring)	1
6	The Chainsmokers	1
6	Coldplay	1
6	Luis Fonsi	1
6	Daddy Yankee (as featuring)	1
6	Clean Bandit	1
6	Zara Larsson (as featuring)	1
6	Shakira	1
6	Pink	1

== See also ==
- Polish Music Charts
- List of number-one albums of 2017 (Poland)
