= Fonografika =

- Founded: 2001
- Founder: Jacek Caba
- Genre: hip-hop, pop, pop rock, heavy metal, jazz, classical
- Country of origin: Poland
- Location: Warsaw, Poland
- Official website: www.fonografika.pl

Fonografika Sp. j. is the largest independent Polish record label, it was founded in 2001 by Jacek Caba, and he actively ran until 2014.

The label is accredited with the rise of Hip-Hop in Poland and has over the years given a push to the majority of Hip Hop releases in Poland. However, since its foundation the label has released albums in many genres; hip-hop, pop, pop rock, heavy metal, jazz and classical music. In total the catalogue comprises some 5000 releases, some of which are: Hanna Banaszak, Made of Hate, Mandaryna, Normalsi, Peja, Slums Attack, Skaldowie, TZN Xenna, Vesania, Apteka, Maria Sadowska and Rootwater.

Fonografika over the years gave a start and distributed labels such as Karrot Kommando, Tone Industria, Artgraff, RPS Enterteyment, Spółdzielnia, Slang Records, INNI Pro, ZKW Atrakcja, Aloha Entertainment, Klin Records, Embryo Nagrania, Szpadyzor Records, Respekt Records, Labirynt Records, Rapton Records, Hemp Rec., Entyrecords LTD, Media Solution Tune Project, Kim Hellmedia, Urban Rec, Alkopoligamia, Reformat4 Records, Step Records, Ganja Mafia Label, Sto Procent, Iberia Records, Penguin Records, Pawlik Relations, and Prosto among others.

In 2014 the label became a subject of criticism based on lack of payouts to artists Flint, Guova and Kajman. Contrary to the popular belief those artists were not signed to the label. However Fonografika distributed the smaller labels (Juicey Juice Nagrania, Onit and Rapton Records) who were responsible and released the albums of the artist who made the public complaint. Later the artists wrote an open apology to Fonografika and the issue was put to rest.

== Artists ==
=== Current ===
- 3Y
- 52UM
- Alicetea
- Bakshish
- Barbara Stępniak-Wilk
- Bezsensu
- Bayer Full
- Chilitoy
- Ciryam
- DJ 600V
- DJ Decks
- Filip Sojka
- Hanna Banaszak
- Justyna Panfilewicz
- Hedfirst
- Krzysztof Jaryczewski
- Letni, Chamski Podryw
- Lostbone
- Made of Hate
- MadMajk
- Masturbathor
- Mind Kampf
- Normalsi
- Oktawia Kawęcka
- Peja
- Scream Maker
- Slums Attack
- Shoom
- Styl V.I.P.
- TZN Xenna
- Vesania (Poland only)
- Weekend
- Wojtczak/Mazolewski/Gos
- Zbigniew Wodecki
- Zebra

=== Former ===
- 2cztery7 (disbanded)
- 4P & Onil
- Analog (disbanded)
- Apteka
- Balkan Electrique
- Bosski Roman
- Bracia
- Deuter
- Dono
- Dreamland
- Emo
- Erijef Massiv
- Fatum Crew
- Firma
- Funky Filon
- Hudy HZD
- Hurragun
- Kabanos
- KaRRamBa
- Kuba Stankiewicz
- KS76
- KrzyHu & NWS
- Mandaryna
- Lukasyno
- Lukasyno & Kriso
- Małpa N.A.S.
- Mały Esz Esz
- Maria Sadowska
- Medi Top Glon
- Molesta Ewenement
- Mollęda
- Moral & Gano
- Mroku
- MyNieMy
- Nagły Atak Spawacza
- Neuronia
- Obóz TA (disbanded)
- Paluch
- Pi eR Dwa (πR2) (disbanded)
- Rootwater (disbanded)
- S2O
- Siła Dźwięq
- Skaldowie
- Slim Motion
- Testor
- Tewu
- V.E.T.O.
