= On (Tau album) =

ON

Studio album by Tau
- Released: 26 May 2017
- Recorded: 2016–2017
- Genre: Hip hop
- Length: 53:48 (CD #1); 55:18 (CD #2)
- Label: Bozon Records (B-C05)
- Producer: Tau; Gibbs; soSpecial

Tau chronology
Restaurator (2015)	ON (2017)	Egzegeza: Księga Pszczół (2019)

Off
- Cover of the second CD entitled OFF.

On (stylized as ON) is the fifth studio album and second double album by the Polish rapper Tau, released on 26 May 2017, on his own record label Bozon Records. It is his third album after changing his stage name from Medium to Tau.

The album was mostly produced by the Polish hip-hop duo soSpecial with additional production by Gibbs and Tau himself. Anatom, Tau's fellow member of Bozon Records, is the only who that appears on the album. The album debuted at number 1 on the Polish OLiS chart.

== Track listing ==
CD #1 – ON
No.	Title	Writer(s)	Producer(s)	Length
1.	"Last Minute" (featuring Anatom)	Piotr Kowalczyk; Jakub Nowak	soSpecial	5:03
2.	"Dawca"	P. Kowalczyk	soSpecial	4:01
3.	"Oko w oko"	P. Kowalczyk	soSpecial	4:33
4.	"Sztuka wyboru"	P. Kowalczyk	Gibbs	3:57
5.	"Święta Trójca"	P. Kowalczyk	soSpecial	3:10
6.	"Chwila szczerości"	P. Kowalczyk	soSpecial	4:40
7.	"Spray"	P. Kowalczyk	soSpecial	4:51
8.	"Selfie"	P. Kowalczyk	Gibbs	2:46
9.	"Newsletter"	P. Kowalczyk	Tau	4:40
10.	"Jestem z Tobą"	P. Kowalczyk	soSpecial	3:58
11.	"Brama"	P. Kowalczyk	Tau	4:42
12.	"Do końca świata"	P. Kowalczyk	Tau	3:02
13.	"ON"	P. Kowalczyk	Gibbs	4:25
Total length:				53:48

CD #2 – OFF
No.	Title	Writer(s)	Producer(s)	Length
1.	"Urlop"	P. Kowalczyk	soSpecial	4:24
2.	"Kochaj mnie"	P. Kowalczyk	soSpecial	4:47
3.	"Dobra wola"	P. Kowalczyk	soSpecial	3:24
4.	"Laurka"	P. Kowalczyk	soSpecial	4:36
5.	"Wieczności"	P. Kowalczyk	soSpecial	5:13
6.	"Wirtualny spacer"	P. Kowalczyk	soSpecial	5:51
7.	"Złota era"	P. Kowalczyk	soSpecial	4:15
8.	"Za"	P. Kowalczyk	soSpecial	4:14
9.	"Superbohater"	P. Kowalczyk	soSpecial	3:30
10.	"Miotacz ognia"	P. Kowalczyk	soSpecial	4:10
11.	"Noce i dnie"	P. Kowalczyk	soSpecial	3:49
12.	"Brzask"	P. Kowalczyk	soSpecial	3:17
13.	"OFF"	P. Kowalczyk	soSpecial	3:48
Total length:				55:18

== See also ==
- List of number-one albums of 2017 (Poland)
