= Restaurator =

Studio album by Tau
- Released: 15 December 2015
- Recorded: 2015
- Genre: Christian hip hop; conscious hip hop
- Label: Bozon Records
- Producer: Chris Carson; Gawvi; Gibbs; Julas; o. Jakub Waszkowiak; Pawbeats; Sherlock; SoDrumatic; Tau; Zdolny

Tau chronology
Remedium (2014)	Restaurator (2015)	ON (2017)

Restaurator (Polish Restorer) is the fourth studio album by Polish rapper Tau, released 15 December 2015 by his own record label Bozon Records. It is his second album released after changing his stage name from Medium to Tau. The album features no guest appearances except several background vocalists.

The album was produced by Chris Carson, Gawvi, Gibbs Julas, o. Jakub Waszkowiak, Pawbeats, Sherlock, SoDrumatic, Zdolny and Tau himself. Restaurator was promoted with three singles, i.e. "Restaurator" released on 21 October 2015, "Pinokyo" released on 19 November 2015, and "Miłosierdzie" released on 10 October 2015. For two of the three tracks videos were made.

The album debuted at number 28 on the Polish OLiS chart.

== Track listing ==
No.	Title	Producer(s)	Length
1.	"Restaurator"	Gibbs	3:54
2.	"Fair Play"	Chris Carson	3:41
3.	"Sternik" (background vocals Agnieszka Musiał & Małgorzata Hutek)	Chris Carson	4:24
4.	"Pinokyo"	Gawvi	4:18
5.	"Ostatni taniec"	Zdolny	4:27
6.	"Święty" (background vocals Agnieszka Musiał & Małgorzata Hutek)	Zdolny	4:27
7.	"Casanova"	Tau	3:15
8.	"Goliat"	SoDrumatic	3:49
9.	"Jestem" (vocals Maleo)	o. J. Waszkowiak	4:45
10.	"Język miłości" (background vocals Agnieszka Musiał)	Tau	3:14
11.	"Na niby"	Pawbeats	4:24
12.	"Ból" (background vocals Agnieszka Musiał & Małgorzata Hutek)	Chris Carson	4:18
13.	"Krzyż"	Tau	4:41
14.	"Kołysanka"	Tau	3:23
15.	"Miłosierdzie"	Sherlock	4:44
16.	"Marzyciel"	Tau	3:04
17.	"Przybysz"	Tau	9:11
18.	"Kosmonauta" (Bonus track)	Julas	3:52
Total length:			67:51

Sample credits

- "Przybysz" contains a sample from "The Lady in My Life" performed by Michael Jackson.
