= Normalsi =

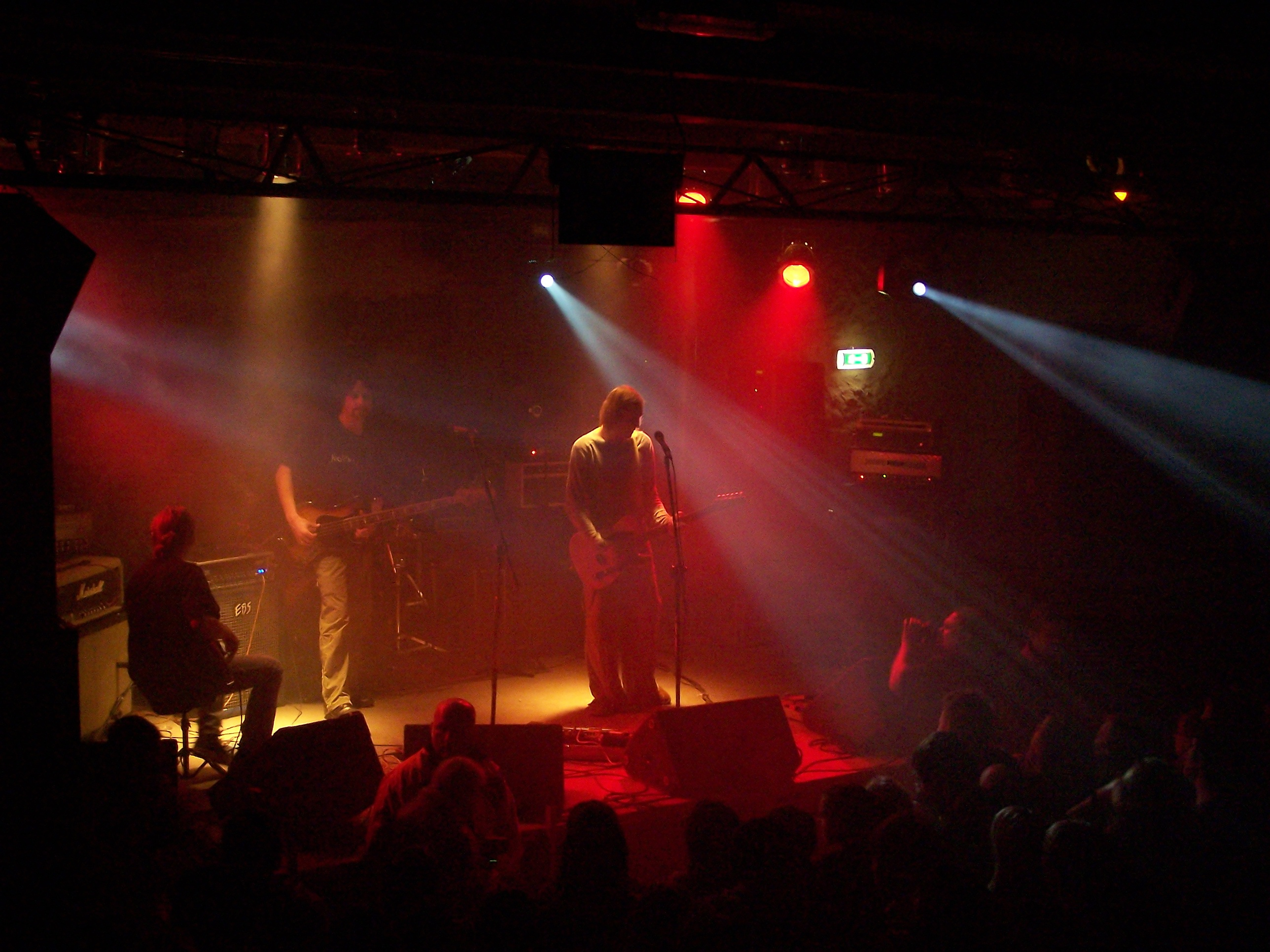
- Normals during the concert in Mega Club in Katowice

Background information
- Origin: Łódź, Poland
- Genres: Alternative rock, post-grunge, hard rock
- Years active: 1999–present
- Labels: Fonografika
- Members: Piotr "Chypis" Pachulski; Mirek "Koniu" Mazurczyk; Marcin "Rittus" Ritter; Krzysztof Szewczyk
- Past members: Adam "Marszałek" Marszałkowski

Normalsi is a Polish rock band from Łódź formed in 1999 by a group of friends. Their music can be described as a blend of classical rock and grunge with poetic lyrics touching upon existential problems.

== Name ==
The name comes from the title of David Gilbert's novel The Normals (Polish Normalsi) that tells a story of a young university graduate, Billy Schine, who decides to take part in an experimental testing of a new anti-psychotic drug in order to earn some money needed to pay his student loan. Gilbert shows the change in the behaviour of the normal, that is, the physically healthy, mentally stable, sober people, who, under the influences of the drug and constant testing, become everything but normal.

== History ==
=== The early days ===
The founders of the band, namely, Piotr Pachulski and Adam Marszałkowski, made their first musical steps in Colorado Band. The music of that band oscillated between rock, country and blues. Soon, however, Pachulski and Marszałkowski decided to leave the group and create a new project closer to their musical inclinations. As a result, in 1999 Normalsi came into being. Shortly afterwards, the band became an essential part of the rock underground in Łódź.

=== Soliloquium (2005) ===
After a series of difficulties with the publisher, six years after the establishment of the band, Normalsi finally released their first album entitled Soliloquium. The whole album is an internal monologue of an artist – a musician at the edge of sanity, who is unable to find himself in the world where people are numb and indifferent. It is a story of a lonely man who tries to preserve his sanity while being entangled in the web of contradictory feelings. When everything fails, the music seems to be the only antidote to his madness.

=== Dekalog, czyli piekło muzykantów (2006) ===
A year after the release of the band’s debut, Soliloquium, Normalsi prepared the second album entitled Dekalog, czyli piekło muzykantów. This time it is a concept album based on the Decalogue, in which each song is an interpretation of one of the Ten Commandments. The album can be seen as a continuation of the themes taken up in Soliloquium at both lyrical and musical level. Not only does it present direct and intimate conversations with God but some songs also feature stories of such biblical characters as Pontius Pilate, Judas, Matthew the Evangelist, or Cain and Abel. In Dekalog… Normalsi do not instruct how to live and deal with everyday problems – they only ask questions which the listeners have to answer themselves.

=== Pokój z widokiem na wojnę (2009) ===
The third album of the band, entitled Pokój z widokiem na wojnę, by similarity to their two previous albums, proves that Normalsi consciously decided not to change their musical style. Despite the lack of musical surprises, the album is not repetitive or monotonous. Once again the listeners are challenged by the band that does not allow them to stay indifferent and forces them to take their stand on the messages conveyed in the songs.

== Members ==
Current members

- Piotr "Chypis" Pachulski – lead vocalist, guitar, lyrics (1999–present)
- Przemysław Wyrwas (2012 - present)

Former members

- Adam "Marszałek" Marszałkowski - drums (1999–2008)
- Mirek "Koniu" Mazurczyk – guitar (1999–2017)
- Grzegorz Szelewa – perkusja (2012-2016)
- Marcin "Rittus" Ritter – bass (1999–2008)
- Krzysztof Szewczyk – drums (2008–2012, died 2015)
- Michał Usdrowski – perkusja (od 2016 do 2021)

== Discography ==
Studio albums

- Niewydana płyta
- Soliloquium (2005)
- Dekalog, czyli piekło muzykantów (2006)
- Pokój z widokiem na wojnę (2009)
- Wiry (2020)
