= Na legalu? =

Fifth studio album of Slums Attack

Na legalu? is the fifth studio album of Slums Attack. It was released in 2001. It was included at the OLiS list. According to Arek Deliś, the record sold in the number of 90.000 copies.

== Track list ==
Source.

1. „Dla ludzi skit” – 0:41
2. „Właściwy wybór” – 4:32
3. „Być nie mieć” – 4:01
4. „Nie-kocham hip-hop” – 3:58
5. „Kolejny stracony dzień” – 5:49
6. „WOS” – 3:35
7. „I moje miasto złą sławą owiane...” – 8:14
8. „Dla frajerstwa skit” – 0:30
9. „Jest jedna rzecz (klub wersja)” – 4:19
10. „Bit w bit skit” – 0:37
11. „Głucha noc” – 5:10
12. „Randori” – 4:22
13. „Mój rap, moja rzeczywistość” – 3:53
14. „O tym, co było i o tym, co jest teraz” – 3:49
15. „Dario Invader Poland” – 1:28
16. „Jest jedna rzecz (dla ulicy RMX)” – 4:39
