= Bozon Records =

- Founded: 2013
- Founder: Piotr "Tau" Kowalczyk
- Distributor(s): Step Records
- Genre: Hip-hop
- Country of origin: Poland
- Location: Kielce, Poland
- Official website: bozonrecords.pl

Bozon Records is a Polish independent record label specialized in hip-hop music. It was founded in 2013 (officially registered in 2015 by National Court Register) by Piotr "Tau" Kowalczyk (at the time known as Medium) after his departure from Asfalt Records. The company was later signed over to Tau's wife Izabela Detka.

Kowalski founded Bozon Records in the late 2013, unexpectedly announcing on his Facebook profile that he had left Asfalt Record in order to start his own label. In the Facebook note he also said that the first record released by the label would be his project Księga życia by his side-project Egzegeza. The title would be later change to Księga słów and was released in June 2013.

In December 2015, Tau announced that Polish freestyler Edzio had joined the label and that he would release his album in 2016, yet nothing has been released since the declaration.

On 11 December 2017, on his Facebook account, Anatom announced his departure from Bozon Records.

== Catalog ==
All information taken from Discogs.

Year	Catalog no.	Artist	Album	Type
2013	B-C01	Egzegeza	Księga słów	CD
2014	B-C02	Tau	Remedium	CD
2015	B-C03	Tau	Restaurator	CD
2016	B-C04	Anatom	Atomistyka	CD
2017	B-C05	Tau	ON	CD
2019	B-C06	Tau	Egzegeza: Księga Pszczół	CD
