= Hanna Banaszak =

Polish jazz singer & poet (born 1957)

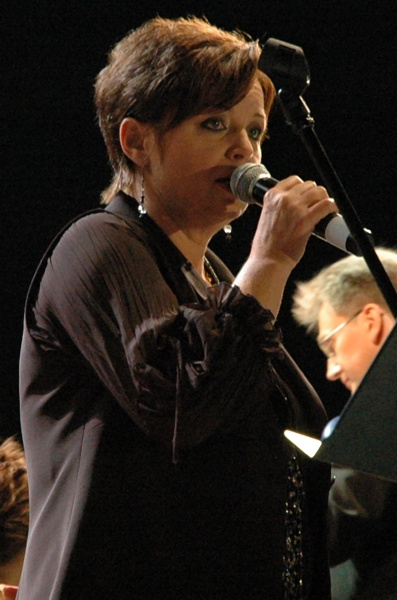
- Hanna Banaszak in September 2007
- Born: April 24, 1957 (age 69); Poznań, Poland
- Occupations: Singer, poet
- Musical career
- Genres: Jazz
- Instrument: Vocals
- Years active: 1973-present
- Labels: Pronit, Wifon, Albatros Records, Polskie Nagrania Muza, Polskie Radio, Soliton, Koch International Poland, Pomaton EMI, Agencja Artystyczna MTJ, Fonografika
- Website: www.hannabanaszak.pl

Hanna Banaszak (born April 24, 1957) is a Polish jazz singer and poet. She was raised in Poznań.

== Discography ==
=== Albums ===
| Title | Album details | Peak chart positions | Certifications |
| Title | Album details | POL | Certifications |
|---|---|---|---|
| Summer | Released: 1980; Label: Pronit, Wifon; Formats: LP | — | |
| Hanna Banaszak | Released: 1986; Label: Polskie Nagrania Muza; Formats: LP, CD | — | |
| Wołanie Eurydyki | Released: 1991; Label: Albatros Records; Formats: CD | — | |
| Echa melodii zapomnianej | Released: March 27, 2000; Label: Pomaton EMI; Formats: CD, digital download | 44 | |
| Kofta | Released: March 10, 2008; Label: Fonografika; Formats: CD | 36 | POL: Gold |
| Hanna Banaszak Śpiewa Piosenki Jerzego Dudusia Matuszkiewicza | Released: April 24, 2013; Label: Fonografika; Formats: CD, digital download | — | |
"—" denotes a recording that did not chart or was not released in that territory.

=== Live albums ===
| Title | Album details | Peak chart positions |
| Title | Album details | POL |
|---|---|---|
| Live | Released: September 19, 2011; Label: Polskie Radio; Formats: CD, digital download | 23 |
"—" denotes a recording that did not chart or was not released in that territory.

=== Compilation albums ===
| Title | Album details | Certifications |
|---|---|---|
| Złota Kolekcja. W moim magicznym domu | Released: 1998; Label: Pomaton EMI; Formats: CD | POL: Gold |

=== Collaborative albums ===
| Title | Album details |
|---|---|
| Zanim będziesz u brzegu with Jerzy Satanowski and Mirosław Czyżykiewicz | Released: March 24, 2001; Label: Polskie Radio; Formats: CD |

=== Christmas albums ===
| Title | Album details |
|---|---|
| Wigilia z Hanną Banaszak | Released: January 10, 1998; Label: Agencja Artystyczna MTJ, Koch International Poland; Formats: CD, digital download |
| Kolędy | Released: November 10, 2013; Label: Soliton; Formats: CD+DVD, digital download |

=== Video albums ===
| Title | Video details |
|---|---|
| Hanna Banaszak - Widowisko artystyczne | Released: 2006; Label: Telewizja Polska; Formats: DVD |

== Poetry ==
- Zamienię Samolubie na Szczodruchy, Oficyna Konfraterni Poetów, Cracow 2006, ISBN 9788386900985
