= Graal (album) =

Studio album by Medium
- Released: 20 November 2012
- Recorded: 2012
- Genre: Hip-hop
- Length: 52:34 (CD 1); 56:25 (CD 2)
- Label: Asfalt
- Producer: Medium

Medium chronology
Teoria równoległych wszechświatów (2011)	Graal (2012)	Remedium (2014)

Graal (stylized as Gr44l; Polish: Holy Grail, pronounced: [ɡral]) is the second album by Polish rapper Tau and the last released under the pseudonym Medium. It was released as a double album on 20 November 2012 by Asfalt Records. Recording took place during 2012 at Studio Łukasza Kowalskiego in Kielce with DJ Deszczu Strugi in charge of mixing the album. As with his previous album Teoria równoległych wszechświatów, production and arrangement were overseen by Medium himself.

The album was promoted with two singles: "Hologram" features a guest appearance by American rapper Gift of Gab, and "Skwer pod słońcem", which was accompanied by a promotional video clip featuring Medium's fans. Graal also features guest appearances by O.S.T.R., Bisz and Te-Tris. The album peaked at number 18 on the Polish OLiS albums chart.

On the album Medium addresses questions of patriotism, his attachment to Christian values, and his relationship with God. The rapper also criticizes the issues of globalization, homosexuality and political correctness. Although it was well-received, Graal also met with criticism, mainly for its lyrics which were considered too radical by most reviewers and listeners.

== Background and promotion ==
Having released his first album Teoria równoległych wszechświatów in 2011 and having received generally positive reviews, Medium announced that he had started working on a new project which would be released in late April, also stating that the news album would completely differ from the previous one. The release date was later postponed to November 2012. In interviews later in 2012, Medium began to talk about his religious conversion to Christianity and indicated that the album would be dedicated to his personal relationship with God and his long-term observations of the world.

"It all started with observations of the sky, then it passed to theorization, touched on meditation and it ended on passionate faith. It is kind of a process which every human should go through to find himself on this planet, and through this, to understand that to tackle God, it is necessary to open yourself up. On Graal I want to balance my listeners' minds. The main idea is to convert you."

— Medium, Interview with T-Mobile

The first single was "Hologram" which featured Gift of Gab, a member of the group Blackalicious. The second single "Skwer pod słońcem" was accompanied by a video clip featuring the rapper's fans. Medium appeared on the show Poziom 2.0 where he performed the track "Kim jesteś?". The reaction to the track was so great that his label decided to release it as the third single. Promotional videos were also made for "Nieme kino", "Graal" and "Zza grobu".

On 12 December 2012 Asfalt Records released 300 copies of the single "Hologram" pressed as a transparent 12" record. The record contained the standard version of "Hologram" and a drum and bass remix.

=== Artwork and imagery ===
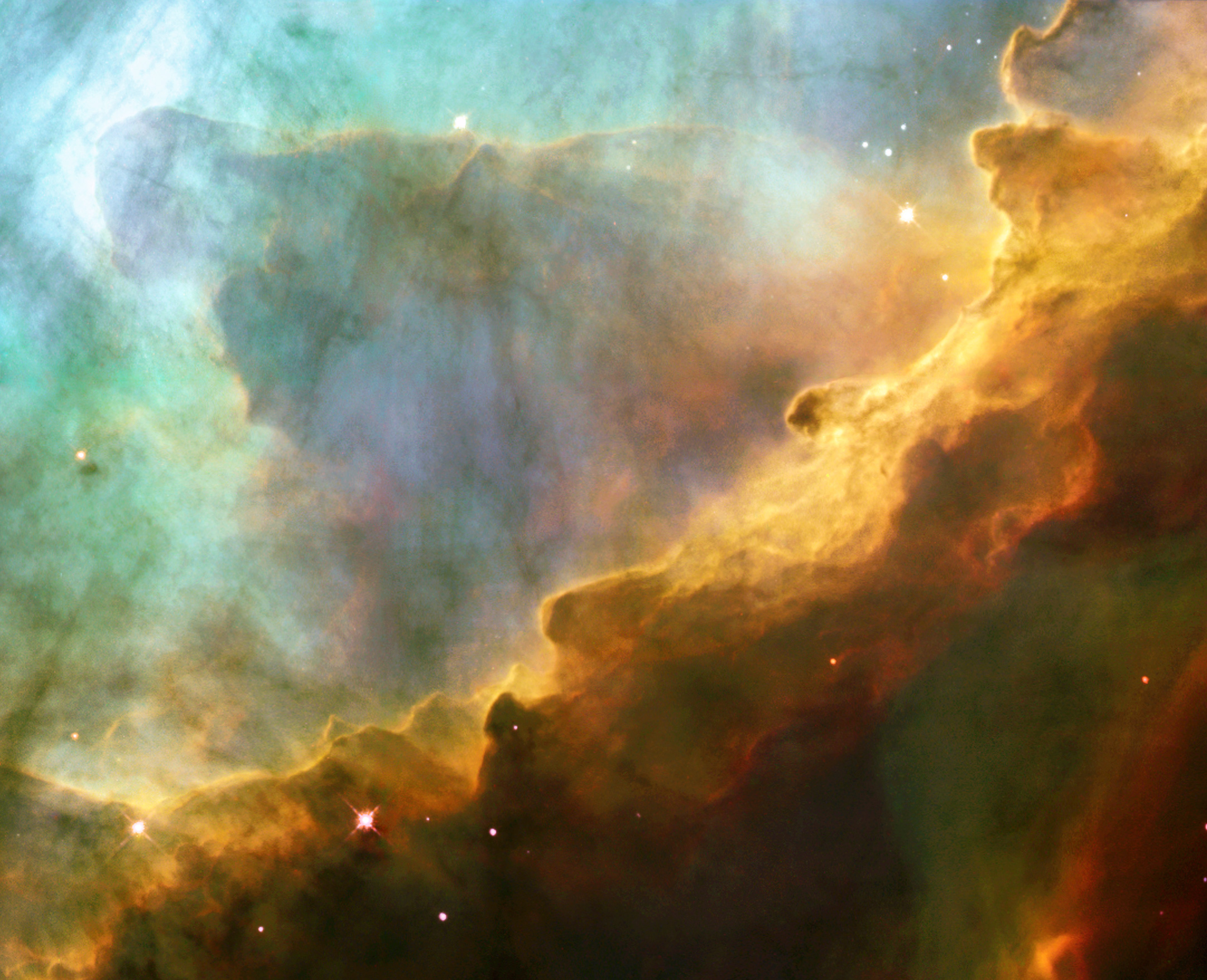
Omega Nebula was the inspiration for creating Graal cover

The cover of Graal was created by an artist under the pseudonym SewerX who had also been responsible for the artwork for Medium's previous album. It was revealed on 7 October 2012 on Asfalt Records' YouTube channel. The cover shows the Omega Nebula and the white triangle inscribed in its center, with a net outstretched over the image. Medium stated:

"[On the cover] you can see the net of infinity and the triangle inscribed in it which unravels because of the light. The light symbolizes something I found, that is, the faith. The faith breaks the triangle which symbolizes my theorization, that is, something I got rid of on the last album. In the background you can see dualism, that is to say, light/darkness. That album is going to be like that […] And the rest of the symbols you can find out for yourselves."

— Medium, Interview with T-Mobile

The title Graal is stylized as Gr44l. The two fours are a reference to the famous Polish poetic drama Dziady (Forefathers) by Adam Mickiewicz where the number 44 was used in scene 5 of act 3, in which Mickiewicz wrote about a "reviver of the nation" who was supposed to bring back freedom for Poland and its people. He described him with words:

"Born from a foreign mother, his blood of ancient heroes,
And his name will be forty and four."

In the artwork inside the CD case several crosses are also visible which represent Medium's conversion. The artwork was well received by both fans and music critics. It was placed on Barock.pl website's list of the best covers of 2012.

== Reception ==
Professional ratings
Review scores
Source	Rating
Onet.pl	6/10 stars
Popkiller	5/6 stars
T-Mobile Music	6/10 stars

The album received mixed reviews from music critics. Most of the reviewers praised its combination of modern electronic music and classic sampling, but the album was criticized for its radical and far-right lyrics. Journalist Marek Fall of Onet.pl wrote that "Graal is one of the most courageous and ambitious projects in the history of Polish hip-hop. Medium's vision combines gospel, the legacy of Polish romanticism, psycho-rap and ultra-conservative journalism. The impetus of this production arouses admiration, but Graal is often just the opposite page of Jezus Maria Peszek, where fanaticism is equal to grandiosity."

On the other hand, Marcin Flint from T-Mobile Music compared Medium to Fisz and Magik, but he also criticized the lyrical content of Graal.

== Track listing ==
All tracks are written by Medium.

CD 1: Półkula księżyca
No.	Title	Samples	Length
1.	"Plac pod księżycem"		2:42
2.	"Graal"	Dialogue from the story "Ali Baba and the Forty Thieves"; Skull Snaps – "It's a New Day"; Ol' Dirty Bastard – "Shimmy Shimmy Ya"; KRS-One / Buckshot – "Past * Present * Future"	4:21
3.	"Picasso"	Édith Piaf – "Heureuse"	4:03
4.	"Hologram (feat. Gift of Gab)"	Dialogue from the story "Ali Baba and the Forty Thieves"; Gravediggaz – "The Night the Earth Cried"	5:48
5.	"Zza grobu"	The Mohawks – "The Champ"; Melvin Bliss – "Synthetic Substitution"; Janusz Muniak Quintet – "Znak zapytania"; Paktofonika – "Kinematografia"; Chris Rock – "Rap Stand Up"	5:14
6.	"Drogo – znaki"	Grupa Skifflowa No To Co & Piotr Janczerski – "Świeci Się Warszawa"; Van McCoy - "Good Night, Baby"; Serge Gainsbourg & Brigitte Bardot – "Bonnie and Clyde"	5:16
7.	"Astral"		4:35
8.	"Nieśmiertelnik"		4:23
9.	"Nakaz wielkości"	Bobby Womack & Peace – "Across 110th Street"	2:25
10.	"Rząd dusz"	Jukka Kuoppamäki – "So Much, So Soon"; Lyn Collins – "Think (About It)"; Medium – "Kim jesteś?"	3:24
11.	"Kim jesteś?"	Lyn Collins – "Think (About It)"; Grażyna Łobaszewska & Ergo Band – "Gdybyś"; Édith Piaf – "Hymne à L'amour"	3:38
12.	"Wielokropek"	Stanisław Sojka – "Matko, która nas znasz"; Janusz Muniak Quintet – "Znak zapytania"; Medium – "Alternatywny zwiastun"	6:45
Total length:			52:34

CD 2: Półkula słońca
No.	Title	Samples	Length
1.	"Eter"	Narration: Justyna Dżbik	3:44
2.	"Jazzba dźwięku"	Ewa Bem – "Nie ma jak, nie ma gdzie"	4:42
3.	"Łzałamaż"		4:18
4.	"Matka planeta"	SBB – "Ze słowem biegnę do ciebie"	5:23
5.	"Meteorologika (feat. Bisz, Te-Tris)"	Czesław Niemen – "Epitafium (Pamięci Piotra)"	5:30
6.	"I zapanuje radość"	Medium – "Opętanie"	3:44
7.	"Nie spać, zwiedzać"	Dialogue from the story "Dzieci taty Abecadła"	3:46
8.	"Piorunochron"		3:27
9.	"Tekst Życia (feat. O.S.T.R.)"	Dionne Warwick – "A Hard Day's Night"	5:27
10.	"Nieme kino"		3:41
11.	"Wyrocznia"	Medium – "Nieme kino"	7:24
12.	"Skwer pod słońcem"		5:18
Total length:			56:25

== Personnel ==
Credits adapted from liner notes.

Musicians

- Medium – lyrics, production, rap, arrangements
- Gift of Gab – lyrics, rap
- Bisz – lyrics, rap
- Te-Tris – lyrics, rap
- O.S.T.R. – lyrics, rap
- DJ Funktion – scratching
- DJ Kebs – scratching
- Justyna Dżbik – narration
- Lila Kowalska – vocals
- Miss Ashberry – vocals
- Izabela Kowalewska – vocals
- Paweł Piotrowsk – piano
- Rolf "Hangklang" Mönnighoff – hang, didgeridoo, shruti box, bansuri, glockenspiel
- Rafał "Rafcox" Gęborek – trumpet
- Jarosław Kulik – congos

Technical personnel

- DJ Deszczu Strugi – mix
- Tytuz – executive producer
- SewerX – artwork

Recording

- Recorded at Studio Łukasza Kowalskiego in Kielce
- Mixed at Otrabarwa Studio in Warsaw
- Mastered at Air Mastering in London
