= Tau (rapper) =

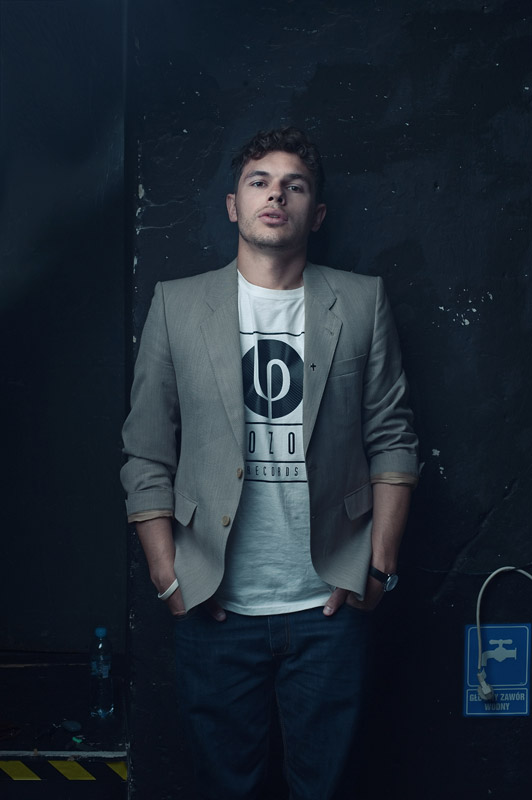

Background information
- Born: Piotr Kowalczyk; 25 June 1986 (age 40); Kielce, Poland
- Genres: Hip-hop; Christian hip hop
- Occupations: Rapper; singer; record producer
- Years active: 2000–present
- Labels: Asfalt; Bozon Records

Piotr Kowalczyk (Polish pronunciation: [ˈpjɔtr kɔˈvalt͡ʂɨk]) (born 25 June 1986), better known under his stage name Tau ([ˈtaw]), and formerly as Medium ([mɛdium]), is a Polish rapper, singer and record producer. In 2008, he released his underground debut album Seans spirytystyczny (Séance) under the name Medium. His next underground album Alternatywne źródło energii (Alternative Energy Source) was released in 2010, which helped Medium to be spotted by Marcin "Tytus" Grabski, CEO of Asfalt Records, who offered him a contract.

On 22 November 2011 Tau released his official debut album (performing as Medium) titled Teoria równoległych wszechświatów (The Theory of Parallel Universes), which, despite slight promotion, sold over eight thousand copies in Poland.

In 2012, Tau announced that he had converted to Christianity. A few months later he released his second album Graal (Holy Grail). The album was highly criticized by many reviewers due to its radical lyrics. In 2013, Medium and producer Galus formed a one-album-group Egzegeza. The album Księga słów (The Book of Words) was released on 28 June 2013 in a limited number of copies.

On 6 December 2013 Medium announced that he had changed his pseudonym to Tau due to the fact that his name Medium may have been seen as connected to mediumship practice, which is in opposition to Christian philosophy. A few days later, on 13 December 2013, he declared that he left Asfalt Records in order to form his own label, Bozon Records.

On 3 December 2014 Tau released his first studio album under his new name, titled Remedium. The album peaked at #4 on the OLiS chart, having sold over fifteen thousand copies.

On 10 August 2015 Tau posted a picture on his Facebook profile with a caption that he had finished making a new album. A few days later he said that it is almost sure that the album would be released in November 2015. On 21 October 2015 Tau revealed that his new project was to be titled Restaurator and it was going to be released on 15 December 2015. In December 2015 Tau said he also was writing an autobiography entitled "Odszukany" (pol. Found), yet not release data was set.

In 2016, Tau stopped touring, saying that he wanted to focus on his new project that he had been working on for a while. On 8 January 2017 a single entitled "ON" was released which was to announce a new album and launching a new charitable foundation, both known as On. On 28 February 2017 the second single "Newsletter" was released. ON was eventually released on 26 May 2017 as a double album, which was divided into two parts entitled "On" and "Off". The album debuted at #1 on the OLiS chart.

In 2018, the rapper said that his next album would be released. In December 2018, he posted a message saying that the album would be named Egzegeza: Księga pszczół (Exegesis: The Book of Bees) and presented its cover. On 9 January 2019 the first single "Ul. Znaków zapytania" was released and the official pre-order was launched, and the rapper announced that the project would be released on 1 March.

== Discography ==
- Alternatywne źródło energii (2010)
- Teoria równoległych wszechświatów (2011)
- Graal (2012)
- Egzegeza: Księga słów (2013)
- Remedium (2014)
- Restaurator (2015)
- On (2017)
- Egzegeza: Księga pszczół (2019)
- Ikona (2020)
- Remedium 2 (2024)
