= Pathogen (Made of Hate album) =

Studio album by Made of Hate
- Released: August 27, 2010
- Recorded: Z-Studios, Olkusz, Poland
- Genre: Melodic death metal
- Length: 41:49
- Label: AFM Records
- Producer: Made of Hate

Made of Hate chronology
Bullet in Your Head (2008)	Pathogen (2010)	Out of Hate (2014)

Professional ratings
Review scores
Source	Rating
AllMusic	3.5/5 stars
Blistering	6.5/10 stars

Pathogen is the second studio album by Polish melodic death metal band Made of Hate. It was released on August 27, 2010, by AFM Records.

== Track listing ==
No.	Title	Lyrics	Music	Length
1.	"Friend"	Mike Kostrzyński	Made of Hate	05:00
2.	"Russian Roulette"	Mike Kostrzyński	Made of Hate	04:17
3.	"You Departed"	Mike Kostrzyński	Made of Hate	04:09
4.	"I Can't Believe"	Mike Kostrzyński	Made of Hate	06:21
5.	"Lock 'n' Load"	Mike Kostrzyński	Made of Hate	03:43
6.	"Pathogen"	Mike Kostrzyński	Made of Hate	05:31
7.	"False Flag"	Mike Kostrzyński	Made of Hate	04:16
8.	"Questions"	Mike Kostrzyński	Made of Hate	04:16
9.	"Russian Roulette" (instrumental)		Made of Hate	04:16
Total length:				41:49

== Credits ==
Made of Hate

- Jarek Kajszczak - bass guitar
- Tomek Grochowski - drums
- Mike Kostrzyński - guitars, backing vocals
- Radek Półrolniczak - lead vocals

Production

- Claudio Bergamin - cover art and design
- Tomasz "Zed" Zalewski - recording, mixing, mastering

Note

- Recorded, produced, mixed and mastered at Z-Studios, Olkusz, Poland.
