= Made of Hate =

Polish band

- Origin: Warsaw, Poland
- Genres: Melodic death metal
- Years active: 2007–Present
- Labels: AFM, Fonografika
- Members: Michał "Mike" Kostrzyński; Radek Półrolniczak; Tomek Grochowski; Marlena Rutkowska
- Past members: Jarek Kajszczak
- Website: www.madeofhate.net

Made of Hate is a Polish melodic death metal band.

== Discography ==
- Bullet in Your Head (2008)
- Pathogen (2010)
- Out of Hate (2014)

== Members ==
Current

- Michał "Mike" Kostrzyński - guitars, backing vocals (2007–present)
- Radek Półrolniczak - lead vocals (2007–present)
- Maciek Krawczyk - bass guitar (2016–present)
- Tomek Grochowski - drums (2007–present)

Former

- Jarek Kajszczak - bass guitar (2007-2012)
- Marlena Rutkowska - bass guitar (2012–2016)
