= Apteka =

Polish rock band

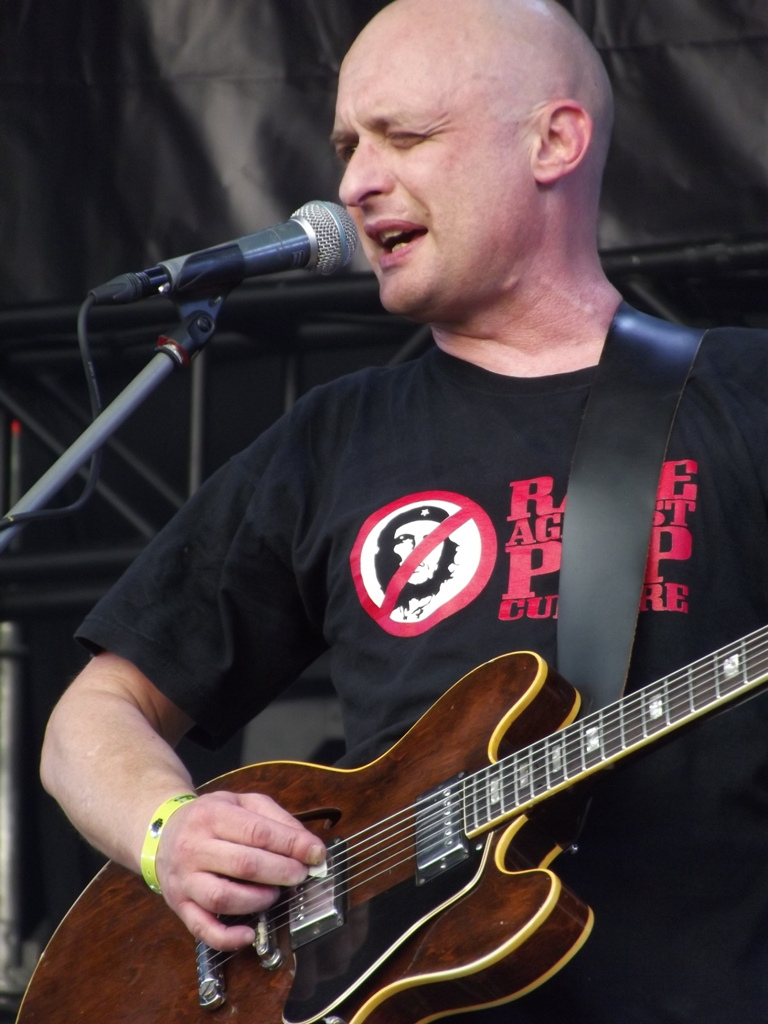
- Jędrzej Kodymowski of Apteka during an OFF Festival 2012 in Katowice.

Background information
- Origin: Gdynia, Poland
- Genres: Rock
- Years active: 1983–1993, 1994–1998, 2007–present
- Labels: Tonpress, Polton, Arston, SPV Poland, SP Records, Koch International, Universal
- Members: Jędrzej Kodymowski; Janek Witaszek; Marcin Słomiński
- Past members: Jacek Łada; "Siwy"; Małgorzata Bachora; Ewa Golianek; Maciej Błasiak; Maciej Wanat; Janusz Sokołowski; Marcin Ciempiel; Piotr Nalepa; Olaf Deriglasoff; Jacek Stromski; Sławomir Czarnota; Artur Hajdasz

Apteka is a Polish rock band, founded in 1983 in Gdynia. Their LP "Narkotyki" won "Płyta Roku" ("LP of the Year") of Gazeta Wyborcza in 1992.

The word "apteka" means "drug store" in Polish.

== Discography ==
=== Studio albums ===
Title	Album details	Peak chart positions
Title	Album details	POL
Big Noise	Released: March 21, 1990; Label: Arston; Formats: CD	—
Narkotyki	Released: April 15, 1992; Label: SPV Poland; Formats: CD, digital download	—
Urojonecałemiasta	Released: August 2, 1993; Label: SPV Poland; Formats: CD, digital download	—
Menda	Released: April 10, 1995; Label: S.P. Records; Formats: CD	—
Spirala	Released: May 8, 1996; Label: Koch International Poland; Formats: CD	—
Apteka	Released: May 23, 2007; Label: Universal Music Poland; Formats: CD, digital download	30
Tylko dla...	Released: June 22, 2010; Label: Fonografika; Formats: CD	—
Od pacyfizmu do ludobójstwa	Released: March 8, 2012; Label: Lou & Rocked Boys; Formats: CD, digital download	—
"—" denotes a recording that did not chart or was not released in that territory.

=== Live albums ===
Title	Album details
Live '92	Released: March 17, 1993; Label: Youmi/Silverton; Formats: CD
