= Slums Attack =

Polish rap group

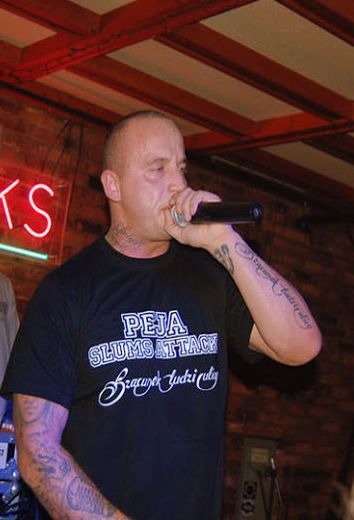
- Peja, 2008

Background information
- Origin: Poznań, Poland
- Genres: Gangsta rap, hip hop
- Years active: 1993–present
- Labels: Fonografika, RPS Enterteyment, My Music
- Members: Peja, Dariusz "DJ Decks" Działek
- Past members: Marcin "Iceman" Maćkowiak
- Website: pejaslumsattack.pl

Slums Attack is a Polish street rap, rap and hip-hop group, founded in 1993 in Poznań by Peja and Marcin "Iceman" Maćkowiak. Since 1998, the group consists of Peja and Dariusz "DJ Decks" Działek. The group became popular in Poland in the 2000s.

== Discography ==
=== Peja/Slums Attack ===
- (1993) Slums Attack – Demo Staszica, MC
- (1995) Slums Attack – Demo Studio Czad, MC
- (1996) Slums Attack – Slums Attack, MC
- (1996) Slums Attack – Mordercy, MC (singiel)
- (1997) Slums Attack – Slums Attack, CD
- (1997) Slums Attack - Singiel (Nie zabijaj, Przemoc, Mordercy), CD
- (1997) Slums Attack – Zwykła codzienność, CD MC
- (1999) Slums Attack – Całkiem nowe oblicze, CD MC
- (1999) Slums Attack – Instrumentale, LP
- (1999) Slums Attack – Odrzuty (Remixy ’99), MC (nielegal)
- (2000) Slums Attack – I nie zmienia się nic, CD MC 2LP
- (2001) Peja/Slums Attack – Na legalu?, CD MC
- (2002) Peja/Slums Attack – Na legalu Plus, 2CD MC
- (2002) Slums Attack - Uliczne Historie, CD MC
- (2003) Peja/Slums Attack – Na legalu?(Na Winylu), 2LP
- (2004) Slums Attack – CNO/INZSN, 2CD
- (2005) Peja/Slums Attack - Płyta promująca album N.O.J.A., CD
- (2005) Peja/Slums Attack – Najlepszą obroną jest atak, 2CD
- (2006) Peja/Slums Attack – Fturując, CD
- (2006) Peja/Slums Attack – Fturując Edycja Specjalna, CD+DVD
- (2006) Peja/Slums Attack – Szacunek ludzi ulicy, CD (singiel)
- (2006) Peja/Slums Attack – SLU 3 Litery, CD (singiel)
- (2006) Peja/Slums Attack – Szacunek Ludzi Ulicy, CD
- (2006) Peja/Slums Attack – Szacunek Ludzi Ulicy Edycja Specjalna, 2CD
- (2008) Peja/Slums Attack – Piętnastak Live, CD
- (2010) Slums Attack – I nie zmienia się nic…, CD (reedycja)
- (2011) Slums Attack – Reedukacja, CD
- (2011) Slums Attack – Reedukacja, 2 CD (edycja limitowana)
- (2011) Slums Attack – Reedukacja, 2LP
- (2012) Slums Attack – CNO2, CD
- (2012) Slums Attack – CNO2, 2CD (edycja limitowana)
- (2013) Slums Attack – CNO2, 2LP
- (2013) Slums Attack – Całkiem Nowe Oblicze, 2CD (reedycja)
- (2013) Slums Attack – 20/20 Evergreen, 2CD
- (2013) Slums Attack – B-SIDES, CD
- (2015) Slums Attack – Zwykła Codzienność (reedycja) (PLANOWANA PREMIERA 5.06.15)

=== DJ Decks ===
- (1998) DJ Decks – Rapa Attack Odsłona Pierwsza, MC
- (1999) DJ Decks – Mixtape Vol. 1, MC
- (2000) DJ Decks – Mixtape Vol. 2, MC
- (2003) DJ Decks – Mixtape Vol. 3, CD MC LP
- (2008) DJ Decks – Mixtape Vol. 4, CD MC

=== Songs published on YouTube ===
- (1998) Slums Attack "Całkiem Nowe Oblicze"
- (1998) Slums Attack "Gdy pomyślę..."
- (1998) Slums Attack "Ty wiesz co jest grane"
- (1998) Slums Attack "Czy wałek czy wyjebka" (home work freestyle'98)
- (1998) Slums Attack "Daj parę słów" (home lab work 1998)
- (2000) Slums Attack "Znikający punkt" (prod. Slums Attack)
- (2003) Peja/Slums Attack "Sprzedajny" (Uncut Raw version) 2003
- (2003) Ski Skład "To dla mnie oczywiste" (prod. Peja)
- (2003) Ski Skład "No co by było gdyby" (Decks RMX)
- (2003) Ski Skład feat. Fu "Dzień zagłady" (PMX RMX 2)
- (2003) Ski Skład "Po to żeby dzieci miały..." (Peja RMX)
- (2004) Peja/Slums Attack "Dotknij gdzie chcesz 3" (Usher wersja)
- (2004) Peja/Slums Attack "Ona i On" (De La Emporio RMX)
- (2004) Peja/Slums Attack "Depresja rappera" (Diamond D wersja vox 1)
- (2005) Peja/Slums Attack "Każdego dnia" (DJ. Zel RMX)
- (2006) Peja/Slums Attack " No i co" (DJ. Zel RMX)
- (2006-2008) RPS "Crime Story" (prod. Sqra)
- (2006-2008) RPS "Frajerzy" (prod. Sqra)
- (2008) RPS feat Charlie P "Czysty nokaut"
- (2008) RPS feat Charlie P "Jedna runda"
- (2008) Charlie P "Szmatka"
- (2008) RPS "Tak bardzo chcę" (wersja niepublikowana)
- (2009) RPS "Staszica Story 5" (prod. DJ. Zel)
- (2009) RPS "Breakin' Borders" (prod. DJ. Premier)
- (2010) RPS "Tylko PEJA"
- (2010) Slums Attack "Jeden za wszystkich"
- (2014) Demówki, odrzuty z albumu Książę aka. SLUMILIONER

Gościnnie na innych płytach

- (1995) Nagły Atak Spawacza - "Anty" (w utworze: „Anty”)
- (1996) Nagły Atak Spawacza – "Brat Juzef" (w utworze: „Anty”) PH Kopalnia
- (1996) Various Artists – "Polski rap zakazane piosenki YO 1" (utwory: „Bronx”, „Śmierć”)
- (1996) Various Artists – "Polski rap zakazane piosenki YO 2" (utwory: „Mordercy” i „Godzina śmierci”)
- (1997) Various Artists – "Polski rap zakazane piosenki YO 3" (w utworze: „Przemoc”)
- (1997) Various Artists – "Polski rap zakazane piosenki YO 4" (w utworze: „Nie zabijaj”)
- (1997) Nagły Atak Spawacza – "92-97" (w utworze: „Anty 95”)
- (1997) Various Artists – "Wspólna scena" (utwory: „Wschodnie czy Zachodnie?” „Człowiek się boi”)
- (1998) Osiedle Pełne Rymów Czyli Hip Hop Jak Okiem Sięgnąć (utwór: Czas Przemija)
- (1998) Various Artists – "Znasz zasady" (utwory: „Negatywny przekaz” oraz „Kilka krótkich zdań)
- (1998) Various Artists – "Robię swoje" (w utworze: „Musisz uwierzyć”)
- (1999) Parafun - "Jedna Siła Jeden Cel" (w utworze: „Gadka”)
- (2000) Klan 03/04 (w utworze „Czas Przemija [instrumental]”)
- (2000) Aifam Klika – Oddalenie demo (utwóry: "Co mnie otacza", Kana Si, Kana La")
- (2000) Projekt Centralny - Od miłości do nienawiści (utwór: "Właśnie tak żyjemy")
- (2000) Świntuch – "Świntuch" (w utworze: „Te rzeczy są fajne”)
- (2000) Klan 11 (utwór: Pamiętam...Nie Zapomnę)
- (2000) Various Artists – "To my rugbiści Soundtrack" (w utworze: „Rugbiści”)
- (2001) Various Artists - "Blokersi Soundtrack" (utwory: „Chłopaki którzy walczą – skit”, „Sianko z muzyki – skit” oraz „I nie zmienia się nic”)
- (2001) Klan 18 (utwory: „Znikający Punkt”, „Niech nie zdarzy Ci się”, „Gorące informacje”)
- (2001) Klan 22 (utwór: Mój Rap Moja Rzeczywistość)
- (2002) Klan Nr 24 (utwór: Mój Rap, Moja Rzeczywistość (Magiera Remix))
- (2002) Klan Nr 27 (utwór: Egoiści)
- (2002) Klan Nr 28 (utwór: Głucha Noc)
- (2002) Various Artist – "Nakręceni Soundtrack" (w utworze: „Klasyczna fuzja (Kasper Hauser)” RMX Magiera
- (2002) Owal/Emcedwa - "Rapnastyk" (jako Ski Skład w utworze: „Kontrast”)
- (2002) Magiera & L.A. - "Kodex" (utwór: „Mnie to nie zachwyca”)
- (2002) WWO - "We własnej osobie" (w utworze: „Chcesz być taki")
- (2003) 52 Dębiec - "P-Ń VI" (jako Ski Skład w utworze: „Kto?!")
- (2003) Sweet Noise - "Revolta" (w utworze: „Jeden taki dzień”)
- (2003) Włodi - "...Jak nowonarodzony" (w utworze: „Odrzucili opcje”)
- (2003) DJ. Decks - "Mixtape Vol. 3" (w utworze: „Cały ten rap”)
- (2003) Various Artists – "600 V" – 600 C (w utworze: „Chcesz rapu?”)
- (2003) Nagły Atak Spawacza – "Niepublikowane" (w utworze: „Antyliroy”)
- (2003) Hemp Gru – "Klucz (nielegal)" (w utworze: „Niech nie zdarzy Ci się”)
- (2003) WWO – "Damy rade (winyl)" (w utworze: „Chcesz być taki”, „Chcesz być taki [instrumental]”)
- (2004) Analogia - "Esensja czysta" (w utworze: „Byłem pewien”)
- (2004) Eska Squad (utwór: Jest Jedna Rzecz)
- (2004) Various Artists – "Road To Hip Hop" (utwór: „Co Cię boli?!”)
- (2004) Zipera - Druga strona medalu (w utworze: „W konwencji rap”)
- (2005) Glon - "NLB - Nieznośny luz bycia" (w utworach: „Wieżowiec”, „Luta w huii dobrze w huii”)
- (2005) Wojtas - "Moja gra" (w utworze: „Zło”) CK Records
- (2005) Various Artists – "Rap Eskadra 2" (w utworze: „Co Cię boli?!”)
- (2006) Waco - "Sampler vol.1" (w utworze: „Promuj Męskie”)
- (2006) Deszczu Strugi - "Mixtape Prosto" (w utworze: „Pod Prąd”)
- (2007) Brahu - "Wchodzę do gry" (w utworze: „Miejska giełda”)
- (2007) Fu - "Krew i Dusza" (w utworze: „Gangsterskie fanaberie”)
- (2007) Gural & Matheo – „Manewry Mixtape z cyklu Janczarskie Opowieści” (w utworze: „Na żywo z Poznania”)
- (2007) White House - "Kodex III: Wyrok" (w utworze: „Czwórka”)
- (2007) Gandi Ganda - "My, ulica i rap" (w utworach: „Dzifka” oraz „Przeciw politykom”)
- (2007) Sandra - "Wszystko albo nic" (w utworze: „Kiedy proszę”)
- (2007) ZJS ( w utworze: „Co jest?”)
- (2008) PTP "Północny Toruń Projekt" (utwory: „Ulice tego słuchają”, „Toruń-Poznań”)
- (2008) Spółdzielnia - "Mixtape 4" (w utworze: „Szczecin-Poznań-Berlin”)
- (2008) Massey – "Człowiek z blizną" (w utworze: „Ej Łania”)
- (2008) PIH – "Kwiaty złą" (w utworze: „Zawsze muszę coś spierdolić”)
- (2008) Mona – "Feromony" (w utworze: „Dla Was”)
- (2008) LWWL – "Mixtape: Stona siedzi na ulicy" (w utworze: „Nie bój się ulic”)
- (2008) TeWu - "Ślad po sobie" (w utworze: „My i wy”)
- (2008) Zido - "Tak to wygląda" (w utworze: „Gdzie jest ten rap”)
- (2008) Vixen - "New-Ton" (w utworze: „Pokazz”)
- (2008) Masło (w utworze: „Nie chcę cofać czasu”)
- (2008) Hemp Gru – "Droga" (w utworze: „Im szybciej się jorgniesz”)
- (2008) Paluch – „Pewniak” (w utworze: „Tu i teraz”)
- (2008) Słoń – „Chore melodie” (w utworze: „Ssij go”)
- (2008) Ditlu (w utworze: „Stara szkoła nowa szkoła”)
- (2009) White House - "Poeci" (w utworze: „Pijak”)
- (2009) Firma - "NieLegalne Rytmy" (w utworze: „Mam wyjebane remix”)
- (2010) Buczer - "Podejrzany o rap vol.2" (w utworze: „Mija kolejny dzień”)
- (2010) Bosski Roman - "Krak3" (w utworze: „Niełatwy żywot ulicznego rapera”)
- (2010) Pih - "Dowód rzeczowy nr 1" (w utworze: „Śniadanie mistrzów”)
- (2010) Kobra - "Na Żywo Z Miasta Grzechu" (w utworze: „Miejski Vibe”)
- (2010) DDK - "Słowo dla ludzi cz.1" (w utworze: „Trzymaj fason 2”)
- (2011) Firma - "Nasza Broń To Nasza Pasja" (w utworze: „Pismakit”)
- (2011) Gandzior - "Gorące Wersy Płoną" (w utworze: „Lutawhuiklik 2011”)
- (2011) Gandzior - "Gorące Wersy Płoną" (w utworze: „Byle do przodu”)
- (2011) PROJEKT ZEMSTY (w utworze: „Zemsty nadejdzie czas 2”)
- (2011) Fabuła - "Made in 2" (w utworze: „Porozmawiajmy”)
- (2011) My Riot - "sweet_noise" (w utworze: „Sam przeciwko wszystkim”)
- (2011) Dono/TeWu - "Daj mi wiarę" (w utworze: „Udowodnij, że potrafisz”)
- (2011) DeFuckTo - "Triumf" (w utworze: „Reality show”)
- (2011) Paluch - "Syntetyczna mafia" (w utworze: „Mój Oldskul”)
- (2011) Kubiszew - "Towar z górnej półki" (w utworze: „Fakju”)
- (2011) Kali - "50/50" (w utworze: „Radykalnie”)
- (2011) Brahu - "Chaos" (w utworze: „Dar”)
- (2011) Sobota - "Gorączka sobotniej nocy" (w utworze: „Naprzód”)
- (2012) Massey/Kubix - "Rób swoje 2" (w utworze: „Hajs”)
- (2012) Buczer - "Dwa oblicza" (w utworze: „Wiara czyni cuda”)
- (2012) HZOP - "Drogowskazy życia" (w utworze: „Każdy z nas”)
- (2012) Śliwa - "Pełen etat" (w utworze: "Ostatnia deska ratunku")
- (2012) Trzeci Wymiar - "Dolina Klaunoow" (w utworze: „Luksusowe Getto”)
- (2012) White House Records - "KODEX 4" (w utworze: „Slumilioner”)
- (2012) Zjawin - "Wszystko jedno" (w utworze: „Głosy w mojej głowie”)
- (2012) Kroolik Underwood - "Gentleman Flow" (w utworze: "Fabryka hitów")
- (2012) Bas Tajpan - "Made in Tajpan" (w utworze: "Lepszy od samego siebie")
- (2013) Viruz - "Pamiętaj, jesteś kimś!!!" (w utworze: "Osiedlowa mentalność")
- (2013) RDW - "W żyłach rap mam" (w utworze: "Bez względu na wszystko")
- (2013) Kroolik Underwood - "Punkt G" (w utworze: "21 wiek")
- (2013) Dixon37 - "O.Z.N.Z." (w utworze: "Dziś a kiedyś")
- (2013) Paluch - "Lepszego Życia Diler" (w utworze: "To nie Życie Zmienia Nas")
- (2013) 3czwarte sukcesu - "Dwa spojrzenia" (w utworze: "Miejsca")
- (2014) De2s - "La vie est un featuring" (w utworze: "Meme avec rien")
- (2014) White House - "Kodex 5" (w utworze: "Firewall")
- (2014) Roman Bosski - "TheRapYa Szokowa Dozwolona Od Lat 18" (w utworze: "Druga Połowa")
- (2014) KaeN - "Piątek 13-go" (w utworze: "Nie Ma Miejsca")
- (2014) Ten Typ Mes - "Trzeba Było Zostać Dresiarzem" (w utworze: "Uśmiechnij Się")
- (2014) Lukasyno - "Bard" (w utworze: "Rynsztok")
- (2014) Rozbójnik Alibaba - "Bal Maturalny" (w utworze: "To Nie Koniec Świata")
- (2014) Cywil - "Lęk Wysokości" (w utworze: "Jak nie my to kto")

=== Music videos ===
- (1997) „Czas przemija”
- (2001) „Mój rap, moja rzeczywistość”
- (2002) „Jest jedna rzecz”
- (2002) „Głucha noc” (feat. Medi Top Glon & Mientha)
- (2002) „Właściwy wybór/Randori”
- (2003) „Być nie mieć” (feat. Wiśniowy)
- (2003) „Jeden taki dzień” (Sweet Noise feat. Peja)
- (2003) „Kto?!”(Pięć Dwa Dębiec feat. Ski Skład)
- (2003) „Dzień zagłady” (Ski Skład feat. FU)
- (2003) „Dzień zagłady” (PMX RMX)
- (2004) „I kto ma lepiej?”(Ski Skład feat. RDW)
- (2004) „Co Cię Boli?!”
- (2004) „Kurewskie życie”
- (2005) „Reprezentuje biedę”
- (2006) „Brudne myśli”
- (2006) „Szacunek ludzi ulicy”
- (2007) „SLU 3 litery/Duchowo mocny”
- (2007) „My i Wy” (TeWu feat. Peja)
- (2007) "Stoprocent” (Peja, Kaczor, Gural, Magik, PIH, BRX, Kajman, Sobota, Miodu)
- (2007) „Kiedy proszę” (Sandra feat. Peja)
- (2008) „Uliczna Sława”
- (2008) „Panie”
- (2008) „Miejska giełda”(Brahu feat. RDW, Peja)
- (2008) „Piętnastak”
- (2008) „Dla moich ludzi” (DJ. Decks feat. Killaz Group& Peja)
- (2008) „Ulice tego słuchają” (PTP feat. Peja)
- (2008) „Bragga”
- (2008) „Szkoła życia” (feat. Kaczor)
- (2010) „Hip Hop”
- (2010) „Frajerhejt 9.12/DTKJ”
- (2010) „Kochana mamo”
- (2010) „Pozwól mi żyć (Są chwile)”
- (2010) „Gruba impra z Rysiem 2”(feat. Gandi Ganda, Kobra)
- (2010) „Śniadanie mistrzów (Pih feat Peja, Pezet)”
- (2010) „Niełatwy Żywot Ulicznego Rapera (Firma feat. Hijack, Gabi, Paluch, Peja, Sobota, Komplex)”
- (2011) „To co robimy” (feat. Vixen)
- (2011) „Oddałbym” (feat. O.S.T.R., Jeru the Damaja)
- (2011) „Udowodnij, że potrafisz” (Dono/TeWu feat. Peja, Pih, Ten Typ Mes)
- (2011) „Reality show” (DeFuckTo feat. Peja)
- (2011) „Sam przeciwko wszystkim” (My Riot feat. Peja)
- (2011) „Kto ma renomę?!”
- (2011) „HSMTO”
- (2012) „Miejski Vibe” (Kobra feat. Peja)
- (2012) „Hajs” (Massey/Kubix feat. Peja)
- (2012) „Każdy z nas” (HZOP feat. Peja, DDK/RPK)
- (2012) „Wiara czyni cuda” (Buczer feat. Peja, Kobra, Dj Decks)
- (2012) „Ostatnia deska ratunku” (Śliwa feat. Peja)
- (2012) „Fabryka hitów” (Kroolik Underwood feat. Peja)
- (2012) „Samotność po zmroku” (feat. Kroolik Underwood)
- (2013) „Radio Wolna Europa” (feat. DeFuckTo, Azyl, Sniper, Clementino, R-MC, Gandzior, Loo-MC, Shazaam, Hijack)
- (2013) "Głosy w mojej głowie" (Zjawin feat. VNM, Żółf, Masło, Pjus, Stasiak, Proceente, Peja, DJ Panda)
- (2013) „CNO2/Hip Hop wciąż żywy”
- (2013) „Colabo” (feat. ONYX, TEWU)
- (2013) „Evergreen”
- (2014) „REHAB”
- (2014) "Bez względu na wszystko" (RDW feat, M-Dot, RPS & Kroolik Underwood)
- (2014) „Kinder des Zorns” (Azyl feat. Peja)
- (2014) „Meme avec rien" (De2s feat. RPS)
- (2014) „Firewall" (White House Records ft. RPS, Śliwa, Kroolik Underwood)
- (2014) „S.A. (Steven Adler)" (feat. Hellfield)
- (2014) „PRR (Prawdziwy rap rozpierdol)"
- (2014) „Rynsztok" (Lukasyno ft. Peja, Kali)
- (2014) „Back in the Days" feat. Kroolik Underwood & DJ. Danek
- (2014) „Defekt Mózgu"
- (2014) „Trudny dzieciak 2"
- (2015) „Nie oglądam się"

=== Guest appearances ===
- (2001) Ascetoholix „Już dawno” prod. TPS Studio
- (2002) Pono „Nieśmiertelna nawijka Zipskładowa”
- (2007) Killaz Group „Manewry” prod. Grupa 13
- (2008) Killaz Group „Zorganizowana grupa rapowa” prod. Flow
- (2008) Gandi Ganda - „Wokół nas”
- (2008) DJ. Decks feat. Mr Krugga „You Can Have It All” prod. DJ. Decks
- (2008) Kaczor feat. Sheller “Rap, pasja, bit” prod. Flow
- (2008) Sheller & Słoń “To ten pozytywny styl” prod. Flow
- (2008) Paluch – “Pewniak”
- (2010) Kobra - “Witamy w mieście”
- (2010) Paluch - “Nowy Trueschool”
- (2010) Kobra feat. Rafi - “(Nadal) Klasycznie“
- (2011) Buczer feat. Bezczel, Kobra - “Ilu z Was“
- (2011) Kubiszew - “Wolność nie zna granic“
- (2011) Dono/TeWu - “Udowodnij, że potrafisz“
- (2011) Śliwa - “Pełen etat“
- (2011) Dono/TeWu - “Co Ty możesz wiedzieć“
- (2012) Buczer - “W jedną stronę bilet“
- (2012) Shellerini - “Sodowych Lamp Blask“ feat. Aifam

=== DVD releases ===
- (2003) Peja/Slums Attack – Na legalu?
- (2008) Peja/Slums Attack – Piętnastak live
- (2015) 20 LAT SLU (20/20 Evergreen)

== Filmography ==
- (2001) Blokersi Solopan (as himself)
- (2006) Ziomek MTV/Fonografika (dubbing)
- (2007) Rodzina Zastępcza Plus (music)
- (2003) Dokument radiowy PEJA Radio Merkury

=== Compilation albums ===
Year	Title	Peak chart position	Certifications
Year	Title	POL	Certifications
1999	Otrzuty (Remixy)'99: Released: 25 October 1999; Label: Camey Studio	—	
2000	Instrumentale: Released: 18 September 2000; Label: Camey Studio	—	
2002	Uliczne historie: Released: 21 October 2002; Label: Camey Studio, R.R.X.	30	
2006	Fturując: Released: 2 May 2006; Label: Fonografika	14	POL: Gold
2013	20/20 Evergreen: Released: 26 October 2013; Label: Fonografika	2	
2013	B-Sides: Released: 21 December 2013; Label: Fonografika	—	
"—" pozycja nie była notowana.

=== Live albums ===
Year	Title	Peak chart position	Certifications
Year	Title	POL	Certifications
2008	Piętnastak Live: Released: 20 October 2008; Label: Fonografika	46	POL: Gold
