= Peja (rapper) =

Polish rapper, songwriter and producer

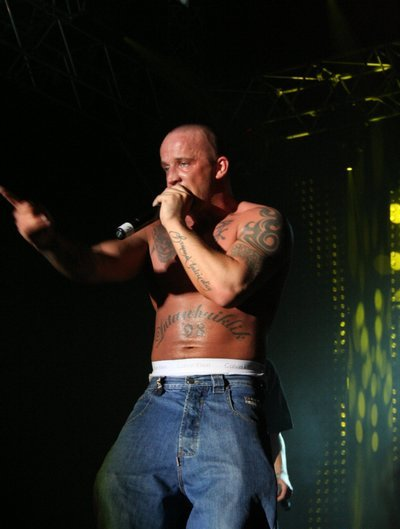
- Peja performing on stage at a concert in Poznan, 2008

Background information
- Born: Ryszard Waldemar Andrzejewski; 17 September 1976 (age 50)
- Origin: Poznań, Poznań Voivodeship, Polish People's Republic
- Genre: Hip-hop
- Occupations: Rapper, songwriter, record producer
- Years active: 1993–present
- Label: Fonografika
- Website: pejaslumsattack.pl

Signature
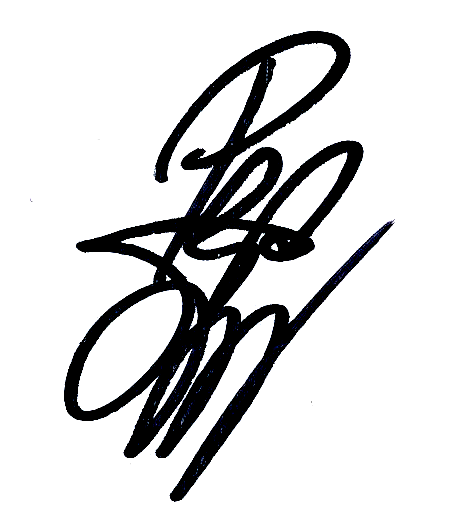

Ryszard "Peja" Andrzejewski (Polish pronunciation: [ˈrɨʂart ˈpɛja andʐɛˈjɛfskʲi], born 17 September 1976 in Poznań) is a Polish rap musician, songwriter and producer. He is best known as the frontman of the Polish rap group Slums Attack. Peja was the recipient of the Fryderyk prize in 2002. In 2001 he played a role in the documentary movie Blokersi. He has been featured in The New York Times and The Source. The Slums Attack broke up in 2016.

Peja has collaborated with such artists as Onyx, Jeru the Damaja, Masta Ace, AZ, Ice-T and Sweet Noise.

== Personal life ==
Andrzejewski was born on 17 September 1976 in the former dzielnica of Jeżyce. He was raised in a working class family, his mother died when he was 12 years old. As described by Peja on the track Doskonały Przykład, his father, Waldemar, was a life-long alcoholic and violent abuser who invited other addicts to party in their home. Peja's early life was marked by violence, as well as interventions by the police and social care. His father died in 1996 of a tumour.

Inspired by the 1988 Seoul Olympics, Ryszard took up judo training and trained as part of the Olimpia Poznań club in the years 1988–1995. Ryszard became a Polish Youth Judo Champion two times, in 1991 and 1992. In 2005, he received a silver badge from the Polish Judo Association for his contribution to the sport in the country.

Since he was 15 years of age, Andrzejewski has been an ardent supporter of Lech Poznań, becoming active in the hooligan scene in the 90s.

== Discography ==
=== Studio albums ===
Title	Album details	Peak chart positions	Sales	Certifications
Title	Album details	POL	Sales	Certifications
Styl życia G`N.O.J.A	Released: 6 December 2008; Label: Fonografika	16	POL: 7,500+	POL: Gold
Na serio	Released: 17 September 2009; Label: Fonografika	2	POL: 15,000+	POL: Gold
Czarny Wrzesień	Released: 6 April 2010; Label: Terrorym/Fonografika	—		
Książę aka. Slumilioner (with WhiteHouse)	Released: 18 October 2014; Label: Fonografika	2	POL: 15,000+	POL: Gold
DDA (with DJ Zel)	Released: 22 April 2016; Label: RPS Enterteyment/Fonografika	4	POL: 15,000+	POL: Gold
25 godzin	Released: 14 December 2018; Label: RPS Enterteyment/Fonografika	—		
"—" denotes a title that did not chart.

=== Music videos ===
Year	Title	Directed	Album	Ref.
2009	"SZG Intro"	GCM	Styl życia G'N.O.J.A.	
2009	"Bragga" (featuring: Charlie P)	GCM	Styl życia G'N.O.J.A.	
2009	"Szkoła życia" (featuring: Kaczor)	GCM	Styl życia G'N.O.J.A.	
2010	"Hip-hop" (featuring: DJ Taek)	Dwaem Media Group	Na serio	
2010	"Frajerhejt 9.12/DTKJ (dlaczego Tede kurwą jest)"	—	Czarny wrzesień	
2010	"Peja vs Hip-Hop"	Filip Tymczyszyn	Czarny wrzesień	
2010	"Kochana mamo" (featuring: Marek Pospieszalski)	GCM	Na serio	
2010	"Pozwól mi żyć (są chwile)" (featuring: Glaca, Ana Herrero)	GCM	Na serio	
2010	"Gruba impra z Rysiem 2" (featuring: Gandi Ganda, Kobra)	Michał Sterzyński	Na serio	
2011	"To co robimy" (featuring: Vixen)	Filip Wendland	Na serio	
2014	"Defekt mózgu" (with WhiteHouse)	9liter FILMY	Książę aka. Slumilioner	
2014	"S.A. (Steven Adler)" (with WhiteHouse; featuring: Hellfield)	9liter FILMY	Książę aka. Slumilioner	
2014	"PRR (Prawdziwy rap rozpierdol)" (oraz WhiteHouse; featuring: DJ. Danek)	—	Książę aka. Slumilioner	
2014	"Back in the Days" (with WhiteHouse; featuring: Kroolik Underwood, DJ Danek)	9liter FILMY	Książę aka. Slumilioner	
2014	"Trudny dzieciak 2" (with WhiteHouse)	9liter FILMY	Książę aka. Slumilioner	
